= Us, Val-d'Oise =

Us
- Commune
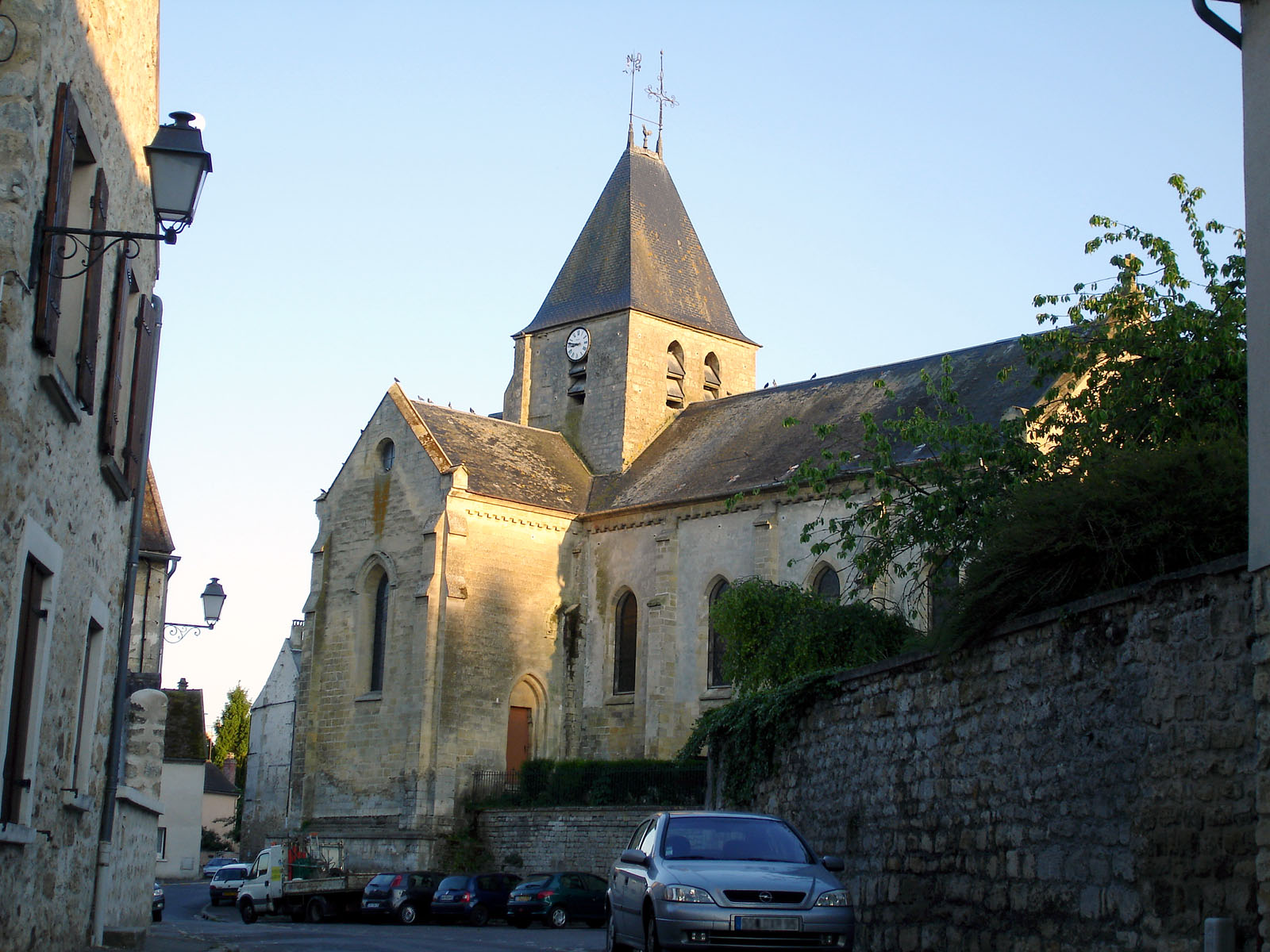
- The church in Us

- Coat of arms
- Location of Us
- Location within France Location within Île-de-France (region)
- Coordinates: 49°06′02″N 1°58′00″E
- Country: France
- Region: Île-de-France
- Department: Val-d'Oise
- Arrondissement: Pontoise
- Canton: Pontoise
- Intercommunality: CC Vexin Centre

Government
  - Mayor (2020–2026): Jhony Bourgin
- Area^{1}: 10.98 km^{2} (4.24 sq mi)
- Elevation: 50 m (160 ft)
- Highest elevation: 55 m (180 ft)
- Lowest elevation: 40 m (130 ft)
- Population (2023): 1,374
  - Density: 125.1/km^{2} (324.1/sq mi)
- Time zone: UTC+01:00 (CET)
  - Summer (DST): UTC+02:00 (CEST)
- INSEE/Postal code: 95625 /95450
- ^{1} French Land Register data, which excludes lakes, ponds, glaciers > 1 km^{2} (0.386 sq mi or 247 acres) and river estuaries.

Us (French pronunciation: [ys]) is a commune in the Val-d'Oise department and Île-de-France region of France.

== Geography ==
The village lies in a rural setting in the valley of the River Viosne, some 40 km north-west of Paris, within the Vexin Regional Nature Park. The commune is bordered by those of Ableiges, Marines, Santeuil, and Vigny. The nearest shopping centre is at Marines.

== Sights ==
- The church of Notre-Dame, parts of which date from the 13th century.
- The 19th-century Château de Dampont and its park.

== Transport ==
Us has a railway station on the line from Gisors to Pontoise and Paris (Gare Saint-Lazare).

== Education ==
The town has a preschool. In 2016 it asked for donations to the school on Facebook.

== See also ==
- Communes of the Val-d'Oise department
