= Ernest Bonnejoy =

French physician and vegetarianism activist

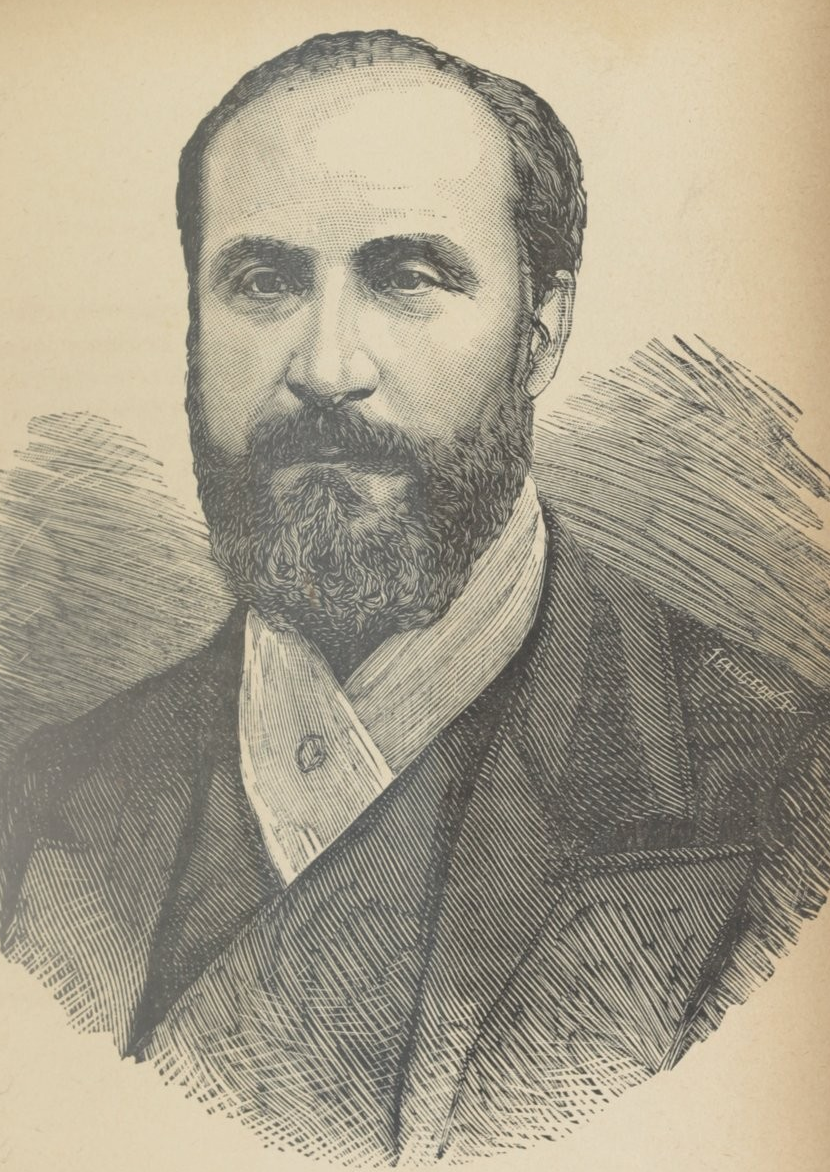
- Born: 1833; Val-d'Oise
- Died: 1896 (aged 62–63)
- Occupations: Physician and vegetarianism activist

Ernest Bonnejoy (1833 – 1896) was a French physician and vegetarianism activist.

== Biography ==
Bonnejoy was born in Val-d'Oise. He was educated at the College of Pontoise and studied medicine in Paris. In 1862, he completed his doctoral thesis on the application of electricity to therapy. He was a hydrotherapist at Forges and moved to Chars in 1870. He was a member of the Société d'Hydrologie (Hydrological Society).

Bonnejoy aimed to rationalize vegetarianism. He favoured health over moral arguments. He argued meat was harmful for health and that vegetarianism could reverse the degeneration of the French population. Bonnejoy considered himself the only serious vegetarian activist in France during the 1880s and was scornful of rival vegetarian authors such as Edmond Pivion and Emile Tanneguy de Wogan. Historians have described Bonnejoy as the most influential French vegetarian in the 1880s and 1890s.

His book Vegetarianism and the Rational Vegetarian Regime (1891) was influenced by the discoveries of Louis Pasteur and the then new germ theory of disease. Bonnejoy promoted "muscular vegetarianism" to boost the immune system and improve public health.

Bonnejoy was a member of the Sociéte Végétarienne de France (Vegetarian Society of France). He contributed to the Society's journal, La Reforme Alimentaire.

== Végétarisme ==
Bonnejoy in his book Le Végétarisme et le Régime Végétarien Rationnel (1891) developed his own version of scientific végétarisme (vegetarianism) in opposition to ordinary vegetarianism and vegetalism (veganism). In the book he argued that meat eating causes degeneration, disease and immorality whilst vegetarianism is favourable to moral development and health.

== Publications ==
- Principes d'alimentation rationnelle hygienique et economique avec des recettes de cuisine vegetarienne (1884)
- Le Végétarisme et le Régime Végétarien Rationnel (1891)
- Principes d'alimentation rationnelle et de cuisine végétarienne (1896)
