= Le Heaulme =

- Commune
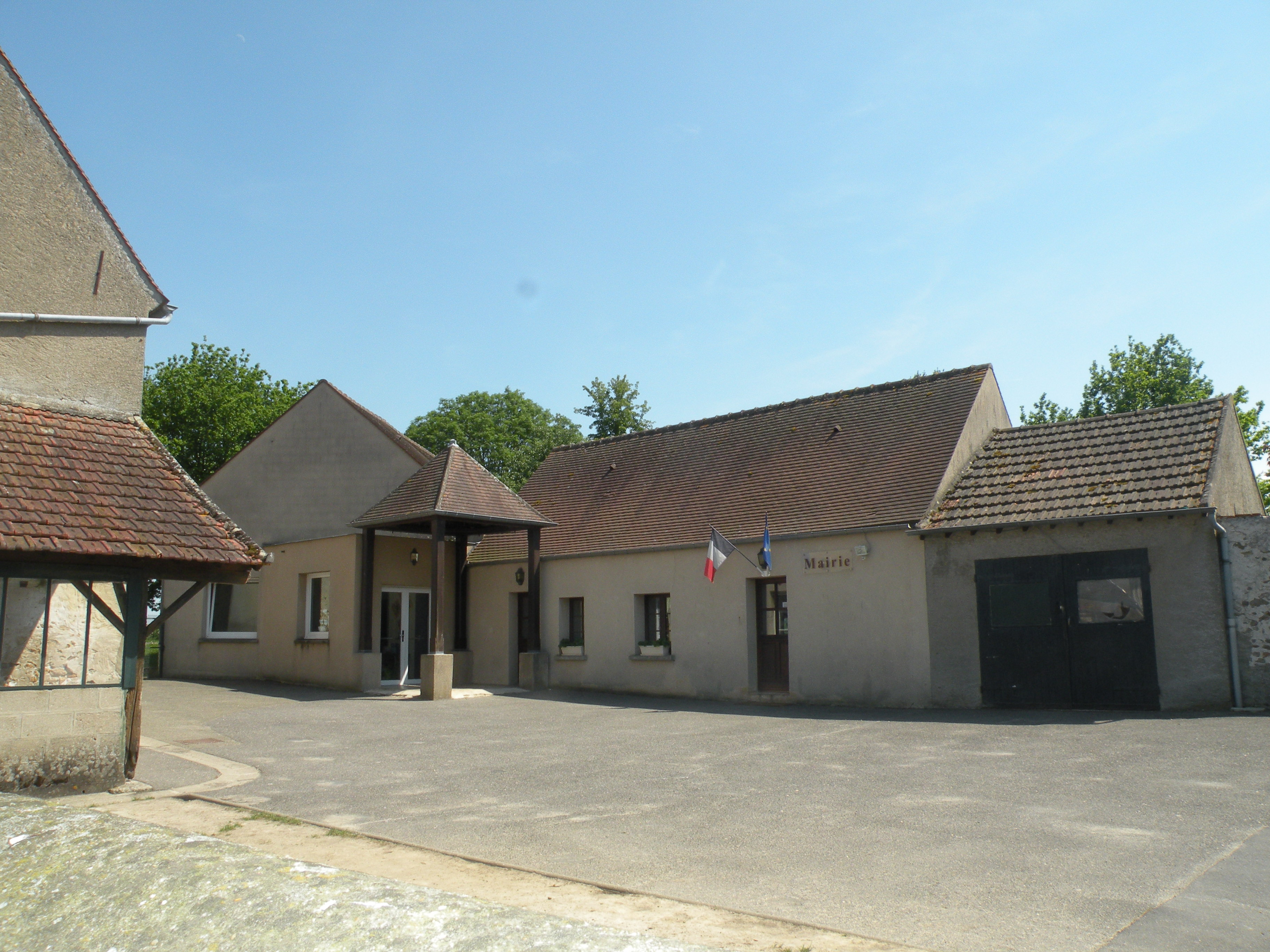
- The town hall of Le Heaulme
- Location of Le Heaulme
- Location within France Location within Île-de-France (region)
- Coordinates: 49°09′59″N 2°00′02″E
- Country: France
- Region: Île-de-France
- Department: Val-d'Oise
- Arrondissement: Pontoise
- Canton: Pontoise

Government
  - Mayor (2020–2026): Maurice Delahaye
- Area^{1}: 1.96 km^{2} (0.76 sq mi)
- Highest elevation: 205 m (673 ft)
- Lowest elevation: 124 m (407 ft)
- Population (2023): 207
  - Density: 106/km^{2} (274/sq mi)
- Time zone: UTC+01:00 (CET)
  - Summer (DST): UTC+02:00 (CEST)
- INSEE/Postal code: 95303 /95640
- ^{1} French Land Register data, which excludes lakes, ponds, glaciers > 1 km^{2} (0.386 sq mi or 247 acres) and river estuaries.

Le Heaulme (French pronunciation: [lə olm]) is a commune in the Val-d'Oise department in Île-de-France in northern France.

== See also ==
- Communes of the Val-d'Oise department
