= Marines, Val-d'Oise =

Marines
- Commune
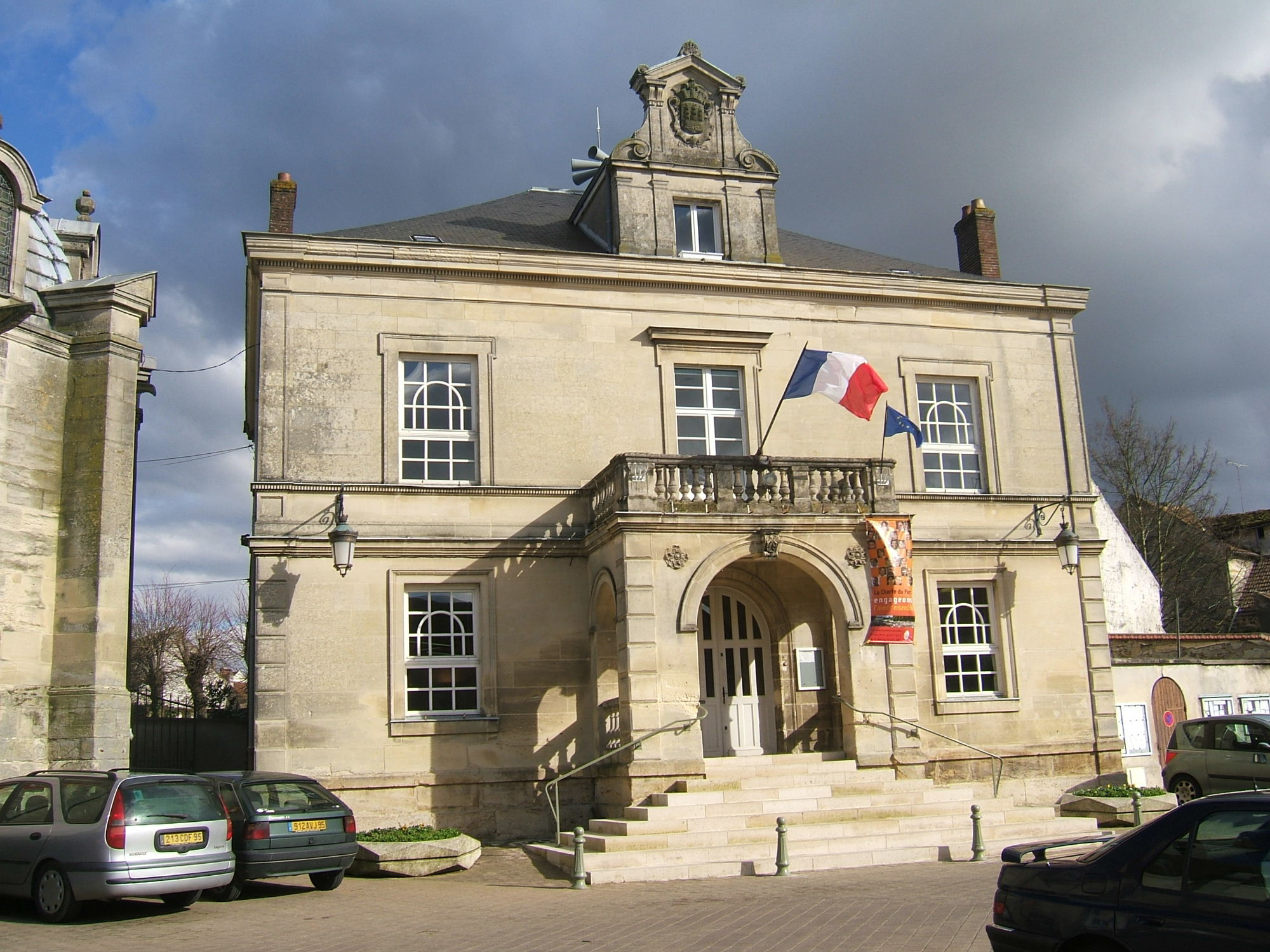
- The town hall of Marines

- Coat of arms
- Location of Marines
- Location within France Location within Île-de-France (region)
- Coordinates: 49°08′45″N 1°59′04″E
- Country: France
- Region: Île-de-France
- Department: Val-d'Oise
- Arrondissement: Pontoise
- Canton: Pontoise

Government
  - Mayor (2020–2026): Nadine Ninot
- Area^{1}: 8.26 km^{2} (3.19 sq mi)
- Highest elevation: 204 m (669 ft)
- Lowest elevation: 90 m (300 ft)
- Population (2023): 3,594
  - Density: 435/km^{2} (1,130/sq mi)
- Time zone: UTC+01:00 (CET)
  - Summer (DST): UTC+02:00 (CEST)
- INSEE/Postal code: 95370 /95640
- ^{1} French Land Register data, which excludes lakes, ponds, glaciers > 1 km^{2} (0.386 sq mi or 247 acres) and river estuaries.

Marines (French pronunciation: [maʁin]) is a commune in the Val-d'Oise department in Île-de-France in northern France.

== Population ==
Historical population
| Year | Pop. | ±% p.a. |
|---|---|---|
| 1968 | 2,021 | — |
| 1975 | 2,074 | +0.37% |
| 1982 | 2,144 | +0.48% |
| 1990 | 2,495 | +1.91% |
| 1999 | 2,925 | +1.78% |
| 2007 | 3,199 | +1.13% |
| 2012 | 3,373 | +1.06% |
| 2017 | 3,481 | +0.63% |
| 2023 | 3,594 | +0.53% |
Source: INSEE

== Twinning ==
Marines has been twinned with the town of Kington in England since 1979. The two places are of a similar population. In Marines there is a residential side-street called "Place Kington", whilst in Kington there is a covered space by the market hall called "Place-de-Marines".

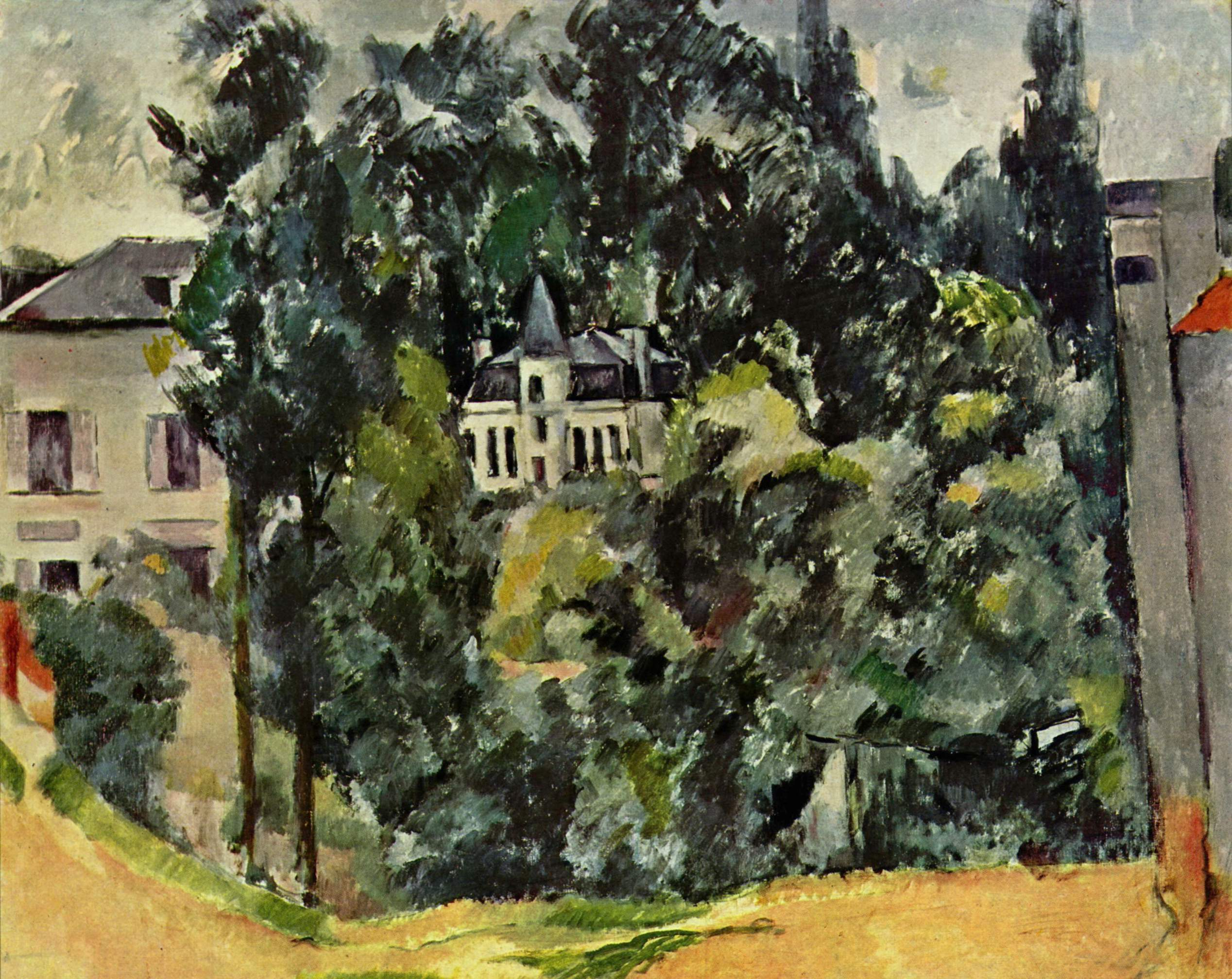
The château de Marines, by Paul Cézanne, 1888-90

== Education ==
Schools in Marines:

- Ecole maternelle des Murgers (preschool)
- Ecole élémentaire Paul Cézanne
- Collège des Hautiers (junior high school)

== Trivia ==
Marines is located next to a village called Us. In the surrounding area, both villages are indicated with signs showing both names listed, which reads as "US MARINES". A regular joke in the region is to make people believe that these signs indicate a nearby U.S Marine Corps base.

== See also ==
- Communes of the Val-d'Oise department
