= Arronville =

- Commune
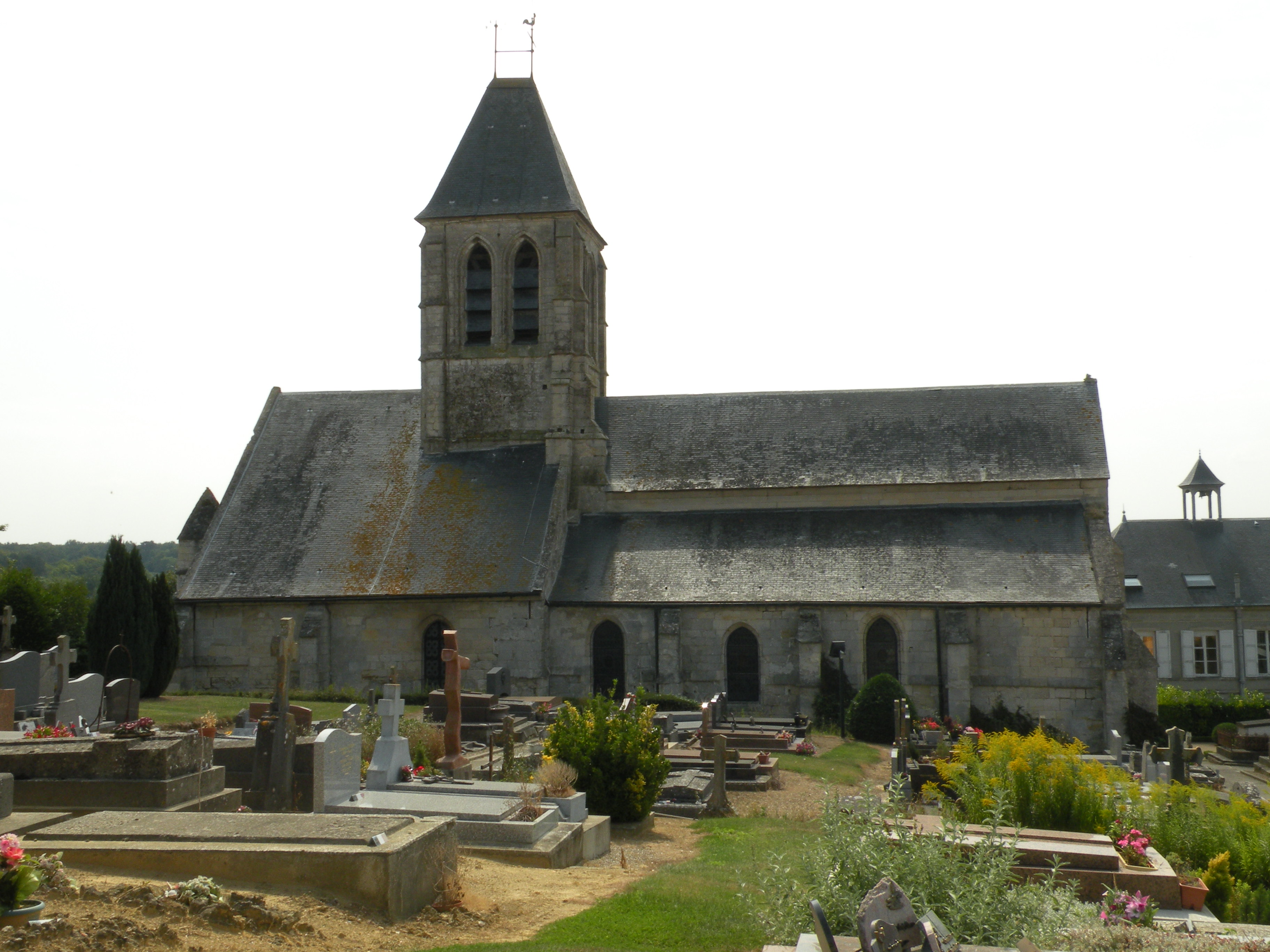
- The church of Arronville

- Coat of arms
- Location of Arronville
- Location within France Location within Île-de-France (region)
- Coordinates: 49°10′55″N 2°06′52″E
- Country: France
- Region: Île-de-France
- Department: Val-d'Oise
- Arrondissement: Pontoise
- Canton: Pontoise
- Intercommunality: CC Sausseron Impressionnistes

Government
  - Mayor (2021–2026): Alain Pasquet
- Area^{1}: 15.85 km^{2} (6.12 sq mi)
- Highest elevation: 140 m (460 ft)
- Lowest elevation: 52 m (171 ft)
- Population (2023): 618
  - Density: 39.0/km^{2} (101/sq mi)
- Time zone: UTC+01:00 (CET)
  - Summer (DST): UTC+02:00 (CEST)
- INSEE/Postal code: 95023 /95810
- ^{1} French Land Register data, which excludes lakes, ponds, glaciers > 1 km^{2} (0.386 sq mi or 247 acres) and river estuaries.

Arronville (French pronunciation: [aʁɔ̃vil]) is a commune in the Val-d'Oise department in Île-de-France in northern France.

== Population ==
Historical population

| Year | Pop. | ±% p.a. |
|---|---|---|
| 1793 | 566 | — |
| 1821 | 560 | −0.04% |
| 1846 | 600 | +0.28% |
| 1872 | 521 | −0.54% |
| 1901 | 470 | −0.35% |
| 1926 | 389 | −0.75% |
| 1946 | 316 | −1.03% |
| 1954 | 350 | +1.29% |
| 1962 | 403 | +1.78% |

| Year | Pop. | ±% p.a. |
|---|---|---|
| 1968 | 396 | −0.29% |
| 1975 | 411 | +0.53% |
| 1982 | 440 | +0.98% |
| 1990 | 553 | +2.90% |
| 1999 | 610 | +1.10% |
| 2007 | 667 | +1.12% |
| 2012 | 659 | −0.24% |
| 2017 | 656 | −0.09% |
| 2023 | 618 | −0.99% |

Source: EHESS and INSEE (1968–2023)

== See also ==
- Communes of the Val-d'Oise department
