= Communes of the Val-d'Oise department =

The following is a list of the 183 communes of the Val-d'Oise department of France.

The communes cooperate in the following intercommunalities (as of 2025):

- Métropole du Grand Paris (partly)
- Communauté d'agglomération de Cergy-Pontoise (partly)
- Communauté d'agglomération Plaine Vallée
- Communauté d'agglomération Roissy Pays de France (partly)
- Communauté d'agglomération Saint Germain Boucles de Seine (partly)
- Communauté d'agglomération Val Parisis
- Communauté de communes Carnelle Pays-de-France
- Communauté de communes du Haut Val d'Oise
- Communauté de communes Sausseron Impressionnistes
- Communauté de communes de la Vallée de l'Oise et des Trois Forêts
- Communauté de communes Vexin Centre
- Communauté de communes du Vexin-Val de Seine

INSEE code	Postal code	Commune
95002	95450	Ableiges
95008	95510	Aincourt
95011	95710	Ambleville
95012	95510	Amenucourt
95014	95580	Andilly
95018	95100	Argenteuil
95019	95400	Arnouville
95023	95810	Arronville
95024	95420	Arthies
95026	95270	Asnières-sur-Oise
95028	95570	Attainville
95039	95430	Auvers-sur-Oise
95040	95450	Avernes
95042	95560	Baillet-en-France
95046	95420	Banthelu
95051	95250	Beauchamp
95052	95260	Beaumont-sur-Oise
95054	95750	Le Bellay-en-Vexin
95055	95270	Bellefontaine
95056	95270	Belloy-en-France
95058	95340	Bernes-sur-Oise
95059	95810	Berville
95060	95550	Bessancourt
95061	95840	Béthemont-la-Forêt
95063	95870	Bezons
95074	95000	Boisemont
95078	95650	Boissy-l'Aillerie
95088	95500	Bonneuil-en-France
95091	95570	Bouffémont
95094	95720	Bouqueval
95101	95710	Bray-et-Lû
95102	95640	Bréançon
95110	95640	Brignancourt
95116	95820	Bruyères-sur-Oise
95119	95770	Buhy
95120	95430	Butry-sur-Oise
95127	95000	Cergy
95134	95660	Champagne-sur-Oise
95139	95420	La Chapelle-en-Vexin
95141	95420	Charmont
95142	95750	Chars
95144	95190	Châtenay-en-France
95149	95270	Chaumontel
95150	95710	Chaussy
95151	95560	Chauvry
95154	95380	Chennevières-lès-Louvres
95157	95510	Chérence
95166	95420	Cléry-en-Vexin
95169	95450	Commeny
95170	95450	Condécourt
95176	95240	Cormeilles-en-Parisis
95177	95830	Cormeilles-en-Vexin
95181	95650	Courcelles-sur-Viosne
95183	95800	Courdimanche
95197	95170	Deuil-la-Barre
95199	95330	Domont
95203	95600	Eaubonne
95205	95440	Écouen
95210	95880	Enghien-les-Bains
95211	95300	Ennery
95212	95380	Épiais-lès-Louvres
95213	95810	Épiais-Rhus
95214	95270	Épinay-Champlâtreux
95218	95610	Éragny-sur-Oise
95219	95120	Ermont
95229	95460	Ézanville
95241	95190	Fontenay-en-Parisis
95250	95470	Fosses
95252	95130	Franconville
95253	95450	Frémainville
95254	95830	Frémécourt
95256	95740	Frépillon
95257	95530	La Frette-sur-Seine
95258	95690	Frouville
95268	95140	Garges-lès-Gonesse
95270	95420	Genainville
95271	95650	Génicourt
95277	95500	Gonesse
95280	95190	Goussainville
95287	95810	Grisy-les-Plâtres
95288	95410	Groslay
95295	95450	Guiry-en-Vexin
95298	95640	Haravilliers
95301	95780	Haute-Isle
95303	95640	Le Heaulme
95304	95690	Hédouville
95306	95220	Herblay-sur-Seine
95308	95300	Hérouville-en-Vexin
95309	95420	Hodent
95313	95290	L'Isle-Adam
95316	95850	Jagny-sous-Bois

INSEE code	Postal code	Commune
95323	95280	Jouy-le-Moutier
95328	95690	Labbeville
95331	95270	Lassy
95341	95300	Livilliers
95348	95450	Longuesse
95351	95380	Louvres
95352	95270	Luzarches
95353	95560	Maffliers
95355	95420	Magny-en-Vexin
95365	95850	Mareil-en-France
95369	95580	Margency
95370	95640	Marines
95371	95670	Marly-la-Ville
95379	95420	Maudétour-en-Vexin
95387	95810	Menouville
95388	95180	Menucourt
95392	95630	Mériel
95394	95540	Méry-sur-Oise
95395	95720	Le Mesnil-Aubry
95409	95570	Moisselles
95422	95650	Montgeroult
95424	95370	Montigny-lès-Cormeilles
95426	95680	Montlignon
95427	95360	Montmagny
95428	95160	Montmorency
95429	95770	Montreuil-sur-Epte
95430	95560	Montsoult
95436	95260	Mours
95438	95640	Moussy
95445	95590	Nerville-la-Forêt
95446	95690	Nesles-la-Vallée
95447	95640	Neuilly-en-Vexin
95450	95000	Neuville-sur-Oise
95452	95590	Nointel
95456	95270	Noisy-sur-Oise
95459	95420	Nucourt
95462	95420	Omerville
95476	95520	Osny
95480	95620	Parmain
95483	95450	Le Perchay
95487	95340	Persan
95488	95480	Pierrelaye
95489	95350	Piscop
95491	95130	Le Plessis-Bouchard
95492	95720	Le Plessis-Gassot
95493	95270	Le Plessis-Luzarches
95500	95300	Pontoise
95504	95590	Presles
95509	95380	Puiseux-en-France
95510	95650	Puiseux-Pontoise
95523	95780	La Roche-Guyon
95527	95700	Roissy-en-France
95529	95340	Ronquerolles
95535	95450	Sagy
95539	95350	Saint-Brice-sous-Forêt
95541	95770	Saint-Clair-sur-Epte
95543	95510	Saint-Cyr-en-Arthies
95554	95420	Saint-Gervais
95555	95210	Saint-Gratien
95563	95320	Saint-Leu-la-Forêt
95566	95270	Saint-Martin-du-Tertre
95572	95310	Saint-Ouen-l'Aumône
95574	95390	Saint-Prix
95580	95470	Saint-Witz
95582	95110	Sannois
95584	95640	Santeuil
95585	95200	Sarcelles
95592	95450	Seraincourt
95594	95270	Seugy
95598	95230	Soisy-sous-Montmorency
95604	95470	Survilliers
95607	95150	Taverny
95610	95450	Théméricourt
95611	95810	Theuville
95612	95500	Le Thillay
95625	95450	Us
95627	95810	Vallangoujard
95628	95760	Valmondois
95633	95500	Vaudherland
95637	95490	Vauréal
95641	95470	Vémars
95651	95510	Vétheuil
95652	95270	Viarmes
95656	95510	Vienne-en-Arthies
95658	95450	Vigny
95660	95570	Villaines-sous-Bois
95675	95380	Villeron
95676	95510	Villers-en-Arthies
95678	95840	Villiers-Adam
95680	95400	Villiers-le-Bel
95682	95720	Villiers-le-Sec
95690	95420	Wy-dit-Joli-Village
