= Menouville =

- Commune
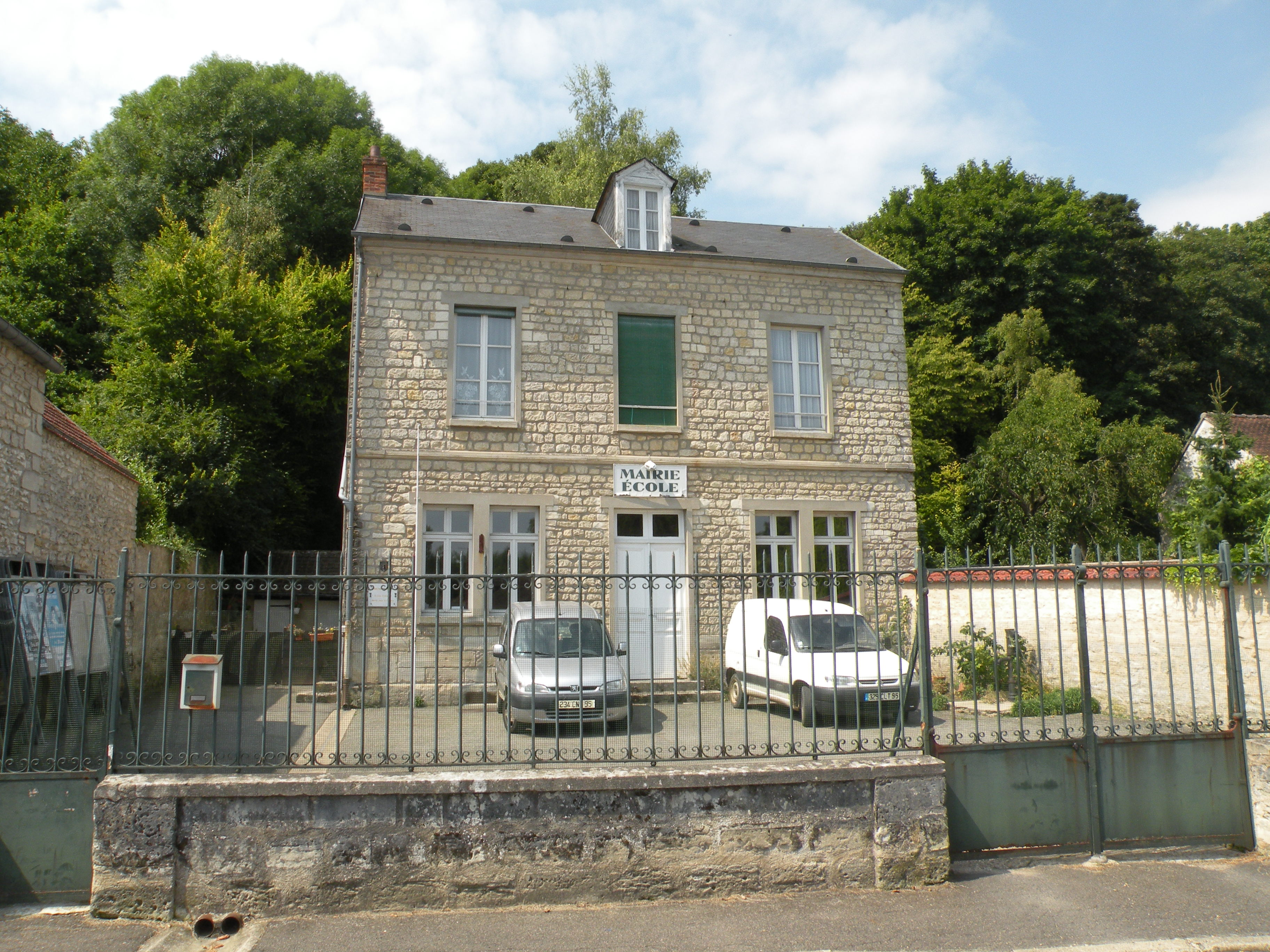
- The town hall of Menouville
- Location of Menouville
- Location within France Location within Île-de-France (region)
- Coordinates: 49°09′06″N 2°06′38″E
- Country: France
- Region: Île-de-France
- Department: Val-d'Oise
- Arrondissement: Pontoise
- Canton: Pontoise
- Intercommunality: CC Sausseron Impressionnistes

Government
  - Mayor (2024–2026): Christian Pion
- Area^{1}: 2.78 km^{2} (1.07 sq mi)
- Highest elevation: 112 m (367 ft)
- Lowest elevation: 47 m (154 ft)
- Population (2023): 62
  - Density: 22/km^{2} (58/sq mi)
- Time zone: UTC+01:00 (CET)
  - Summer (DST): UTC+02:00 (CEST)
- INSEE/Postal code: 95387 /95810
- ^{1} French Land Register data, which excludes lakes, ponds, glaciers > 1 km^{2} (0.386 sq mi or 247 acres) and river estuaries.

Menouville (French pronunciation: [mənuvil]) is a commune in the Val-d'Oise department in Île-de-France in northern France.

== See also ==
- Communes of the Val-d'Oise department
