= Le Perchay =

- Commune
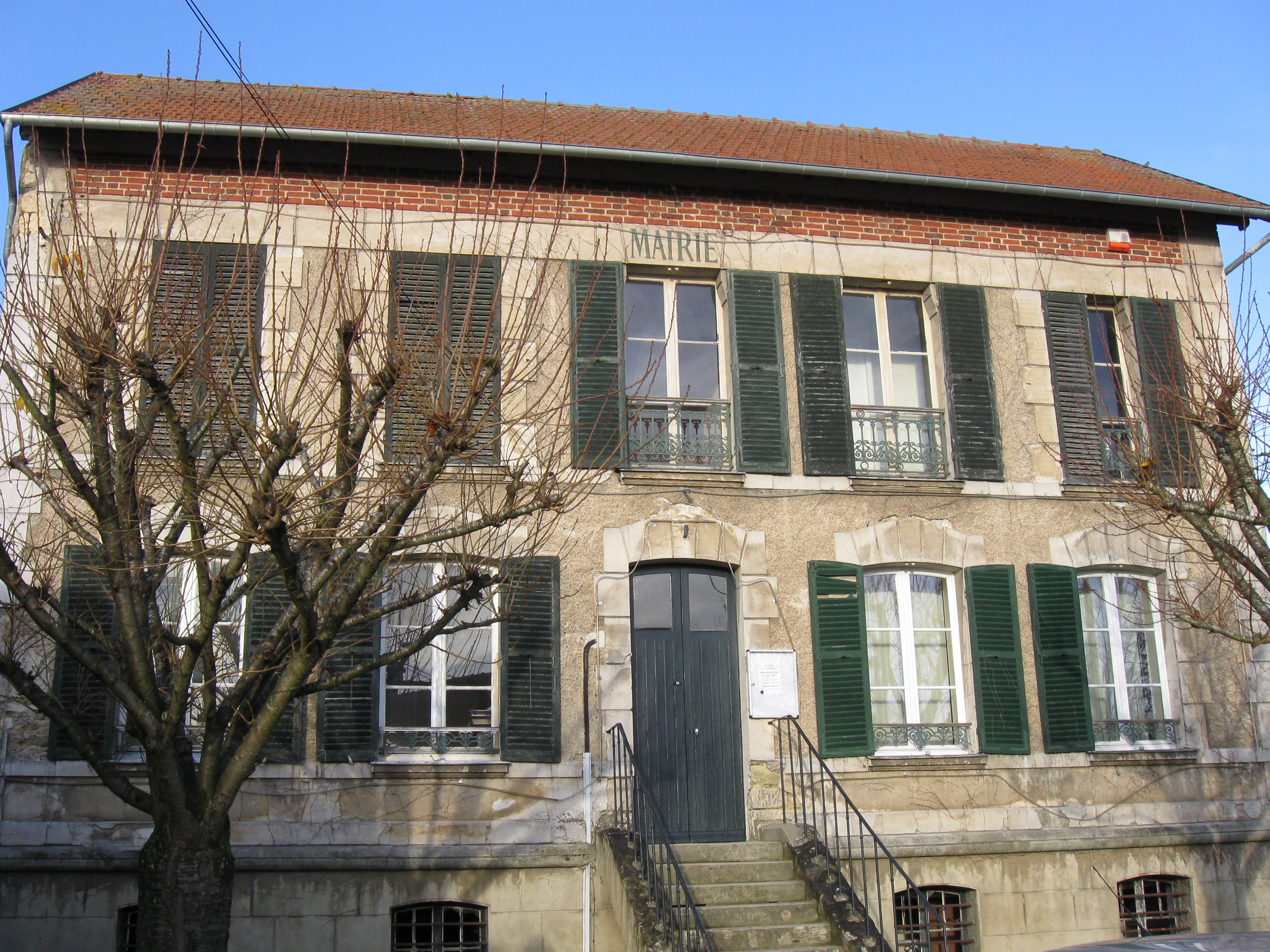
- The town hall of Le Perchay

- Coat of arms
- Location of Le Perchay
- Location within France Location within Île-de-France (region)
- Coordinates: 49°06′42″N 1°56′01″E
- Country: France
- Region: Île-de-France
- Department: Val-d'Oise
- Arrondissement: Pontoise
- Canton: Pontoise

Government
  - Mayor (2021–2026): Grégory Leost
- Area^{1}: 5.46 km^{2} (2.11 sq mi)
- Highest elevation: 117 m (384 ft)
- Lowest elevation: 52 m (171 ft)
- Population (2023): 504
  - Density: 92.3/km^{2} (239/sq mi)
- Time zone: UTC+01:00 (CET)
  - Summer (DST): UTC+02:00 (CEST)
- INSEE/Postal code: 95483 /95450
- ^{1} French Land Register data, which excludes lakes, ponds, glaciers > 1 km^{2} (0.386 sq mi or 247 acres) and river estuaries.

Le Perchay (French pronunciation: [lə pɛʁʃɛ]) is a commune in the Val-d'Oise department in Île-de-France in northern France.

== See also ==
- Communes of the Val-d'Oise department
