= Brignancourt =

- Commune
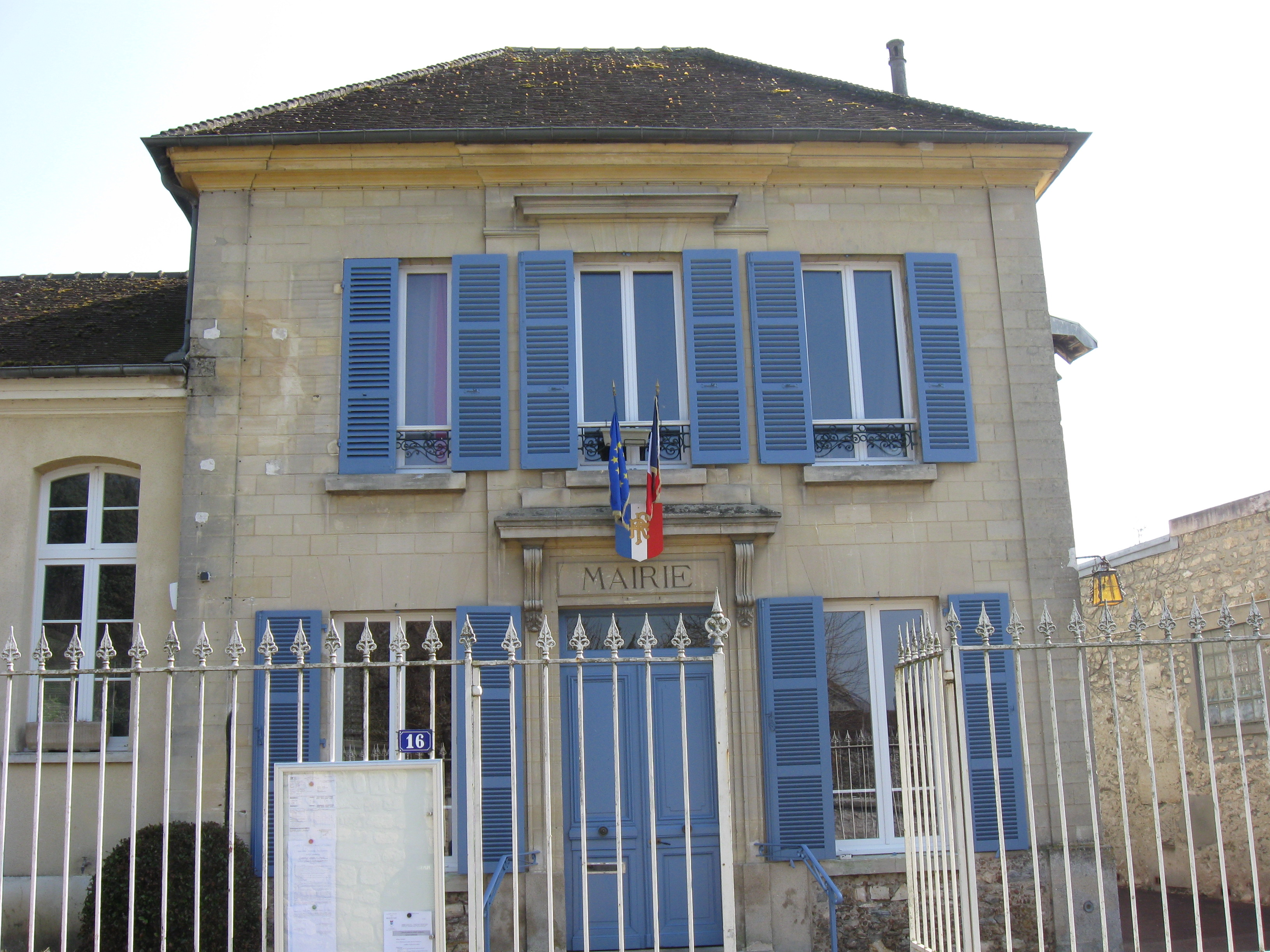
- Brignancourt village hall

- Coat of arms
- Location of Brignancourt
- Location within France Location within Île-de-France (region)
- Coordinates: 49°08′19″N 1°56′38″E
- Country: France
- Region: Île-de-France
- Department: Val-d'Oise
- Arrondissement: Pontoise
- Canton: Pontoise
- Intercommunality: CC Vexin Centre

Government
  - Mayor (2022–2026): Bertrand Lachaise
- Area^{1}: 3.06 km^{2} (1.18 sq mi)
- Highest elevation: 112 m (367 ft)
- Lowest elevation: 52 m (171 ft)
- Population (2023): 262
  - Density: 85.6/km^{2} (222/sq mi)
- Time zone: UTC+01:00 (CET)
  - Summer (DST): UTC+02:00 (CEST)
- INSEE/Postal code: 95110 /95640
- ^{1} French Land Register data, which excludes lakes, ponds, glaciers > 1 km^{2} (0.386 sq mi or 247 acres) and river estuaries.

Brignancourt (French pronunciation: [bʁiɲɑ̃kuʁ]) is a commune in the Val-d'Oise department in Île-de-France in northern France.

== See also ==
- Communes of the Val-d'Oise department
