= Berville, Val-d'Oise =

Berville
- Commune
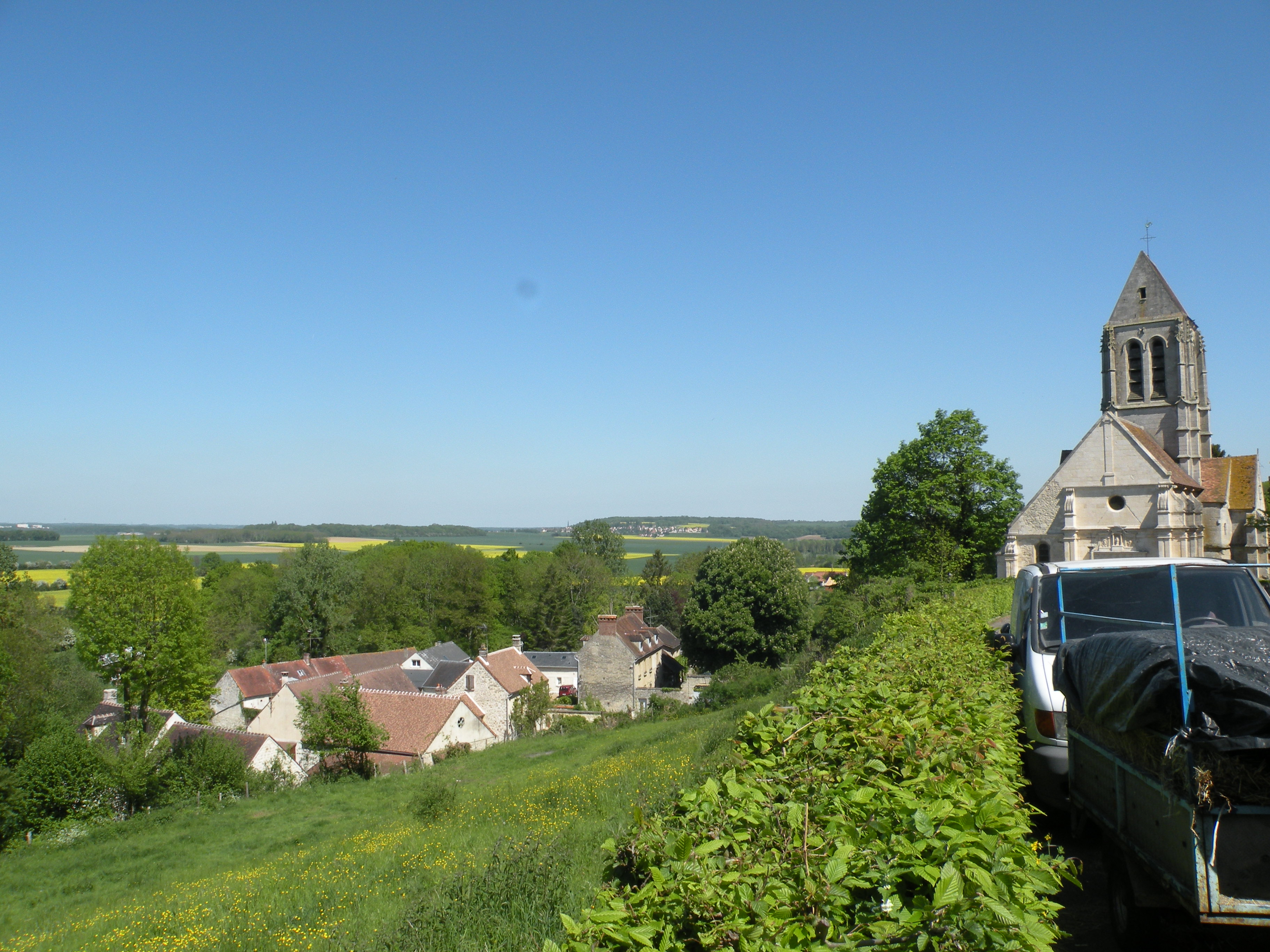
- A general view of Berville
- Location of Berville
- Location within France Location within Île-de-France (region)
- Coordinates: 49°11′29″N 2°04′21″E
- Country: France
- Region: Île-de-France
- Department: Val-d'Oise
- Arrondissement: Pontoise
- Canton: Pontoise
- Intercommunality: Vexin Centre

Government
  - Mayor (2020–2026): Isabelle Joncour
- Area^{1}: 8.51 km^{2} (3.29 sq mi)
- Highest elevation: 155 m (509 ft)
- Lowest elevation: 67 m (220 ft)
- Population (2023): 374
  - Density: 43.9/km^{2} (114/sq mi)
- Time zone: UTC+01:00 (CET)
  - Summer (DST): UTC+02:00 (CEST)
- INSEE/Postal code: 95059 /95810
- ^{1} French Land Register data, which excludes lakes, ponds, glaciers > 1 km^{2} (0.386 sq mi or 247 acres) and river estuaries.

Berville (French pronunciation: [bɛʁvil]) is a commune in the Val-d'Oise department in Île-de-France in northern France.

== See also ==
- Communes of the Val-d'Oise department
