= Neuilly-en-Vexin =

- Commune
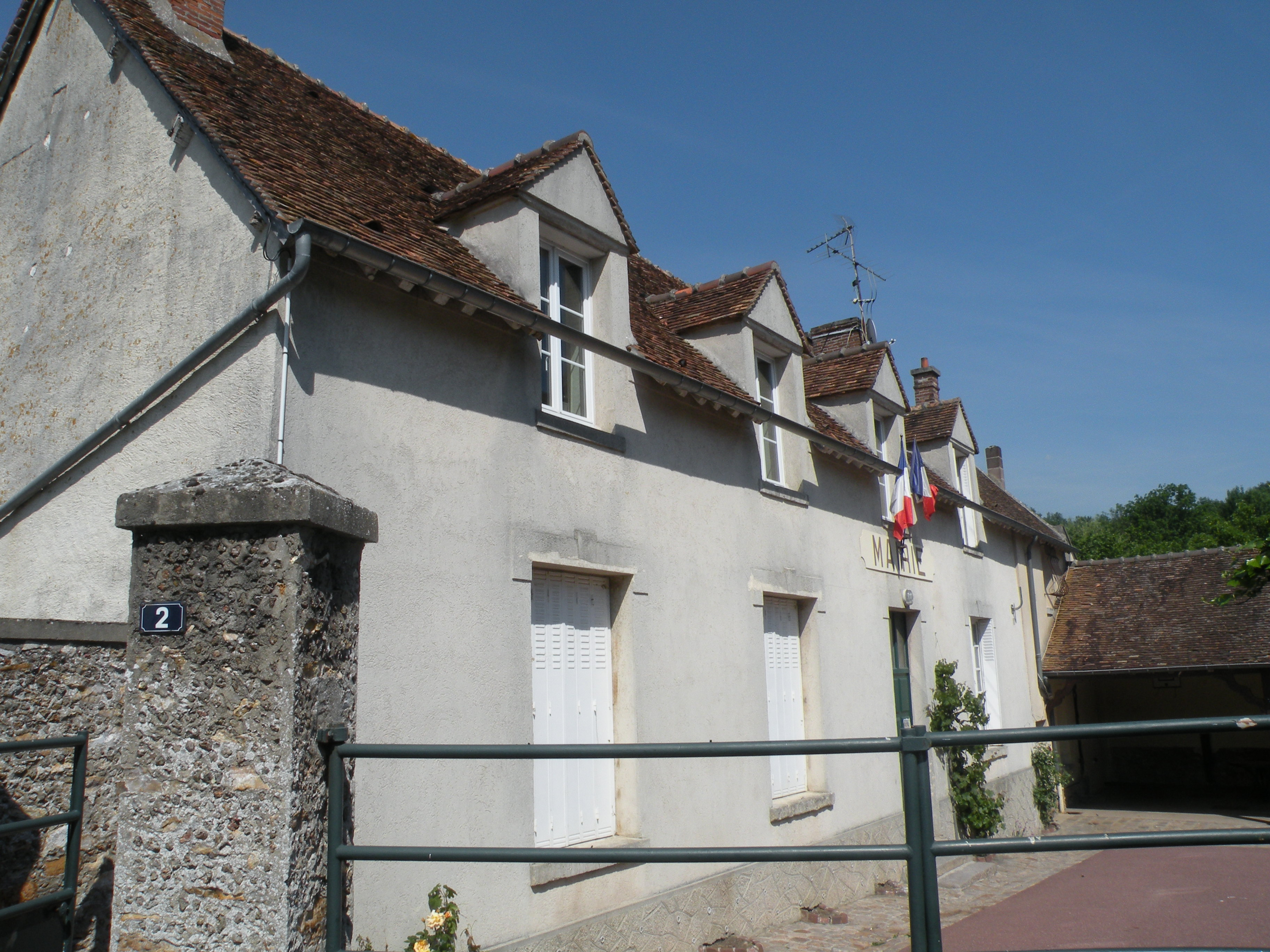
- The town hall in Neuilly-en-Vexin
- Location of Neuilly-en-Vexin
- Location within France Location within Île-de-France (region)
- Coordinates: 49°10′09″N 1°58′38″E
- Country: France
- Region: Île-de-France
- Department: Val-d'Oise
- Arrondissement: Pontoise
- Canton: Pontoise

Government
  - Mayor (2022–2026): Jerome Olivier
- Area^{1}: 2.96 km^{2} (1.14 sq mi)
- Highest elevation: 190 m (620 ft)
- Lowest elevation: 102 m (335 ft)
- Population (2023): 240
  - Density: 81/km^{2} (210/sq mi)
- Time zone: UTC+01:00 (CET)
  - Summer (DST): UTC+02:00 (CEST)
- INSEE/Postal code: 95447 /95640
- ^{1} French Land Register data, which excludes lakes, ponds, glaciers > 1 km^{2} (0.386 sq mi or 247 acres) and river estuaries.

Neuilly-en-Vexin (French pronunciation: [nøji ɑ̃ vɛksɛ̃], literally Neuilly in Vexin) is a commune in the Val-d'Oise department in Île-de-France, northern France.

== See also ==
- Communes of the Val-d'Oise department
