= Canton of Pontoise =

Coordinates: 49.05°N 2.10°E

The canton of Pontoise is an administrative division of the Val-d'Oise department, Île-de-France region, northern France. Its borders were modified at the French canton reorganisation which came into effect in March 2015. Its seat is in Pontoise.

It consists of the following communes:

1. Ableiges
2. Arronville
3. Le Bellay-en-Vexin
4. Berville
5. Boissy-l'Aillerie
6. Bréançon
7. Brignancourt
8. Chars
9. Commeny
10. Cormeilles-en-Vexin
11. Courcelles-sur-Viosne
12. Ennery
13. Épiais-Rhus
14. Frémécourt
15. Génicourt
16. Grisy-les-Plâtres
17. Haravilliers
18. Le Heaulme
19. Livilliers
20. Marines
21. Menouville
22. Montgeroult
23. Moussy
24. Neuilly-en-Vexin
25. Nucourt
26. Le Perchay
27. Pontoise
28. Santeuil
29. Theuville
30. Us
31. Vallangoujard
