= Vallangoujard =

- Commune
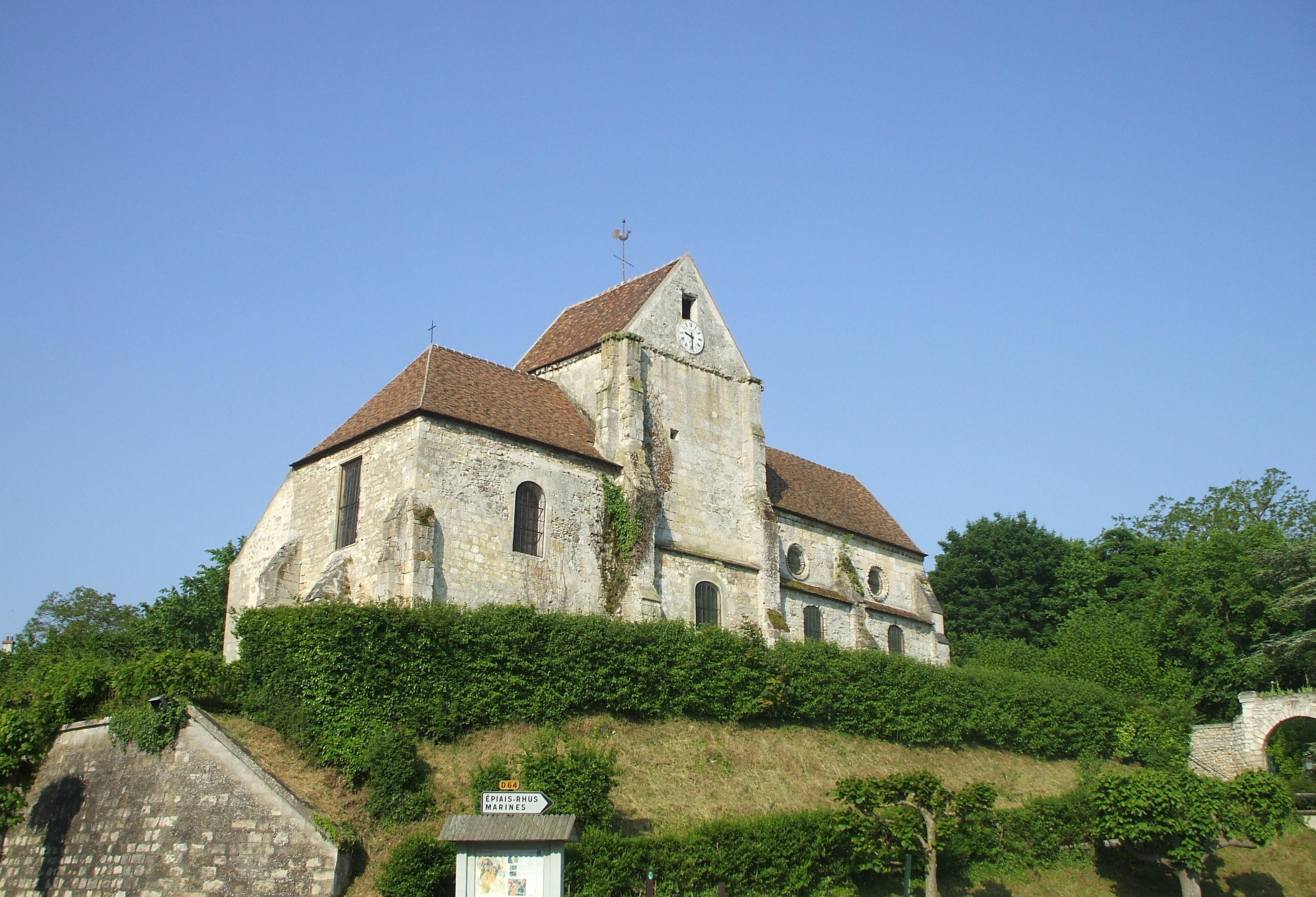
- The church in Vallangoujard
- Location of Vallangoujard
- Location within France Location within Île-de-France (region)
- Coordinates: 49°08′26″N 2°06′46″E
- Country: France
- Region: Île-de-France
- Department: Val-d'Oise
- Arrondissement: Pontoise
- Canton: Pontoise
- Intercommunality: CC Sausseron Impressionnistes

Government
  - Mayor (2020–2026): Marc Giroud
- Area^{1}: 7.60 km^{2} (2.93 sq mi)
- Highest elevation: 126 m (413 ft)
- Lowest elevation: 46 m (151 ft)
- Population (2023): 625
  - Density: 82.2/km^{2} (213/sq mi)
- Time zone: UTC+01:00 (CET)
  - Summer (DST): UTC+02:00 (CEST)
- INSEE/Postal code: 95627 /95810
- ^{1} French Land Register data, which excludes lakes, ponds, glaciers > 1 km^{2} (0.386 sq mi or 247 acres) and river estuaries.

Vallangoujard (French pronunciation: [valɑ̃ɡuʒaʁ]) is a commune in the Val-d'Oise department in Île-de-France in northern France.

== See also ==
- Communes of the Val-d'Oise department
