= Haravilliers =

- Commune
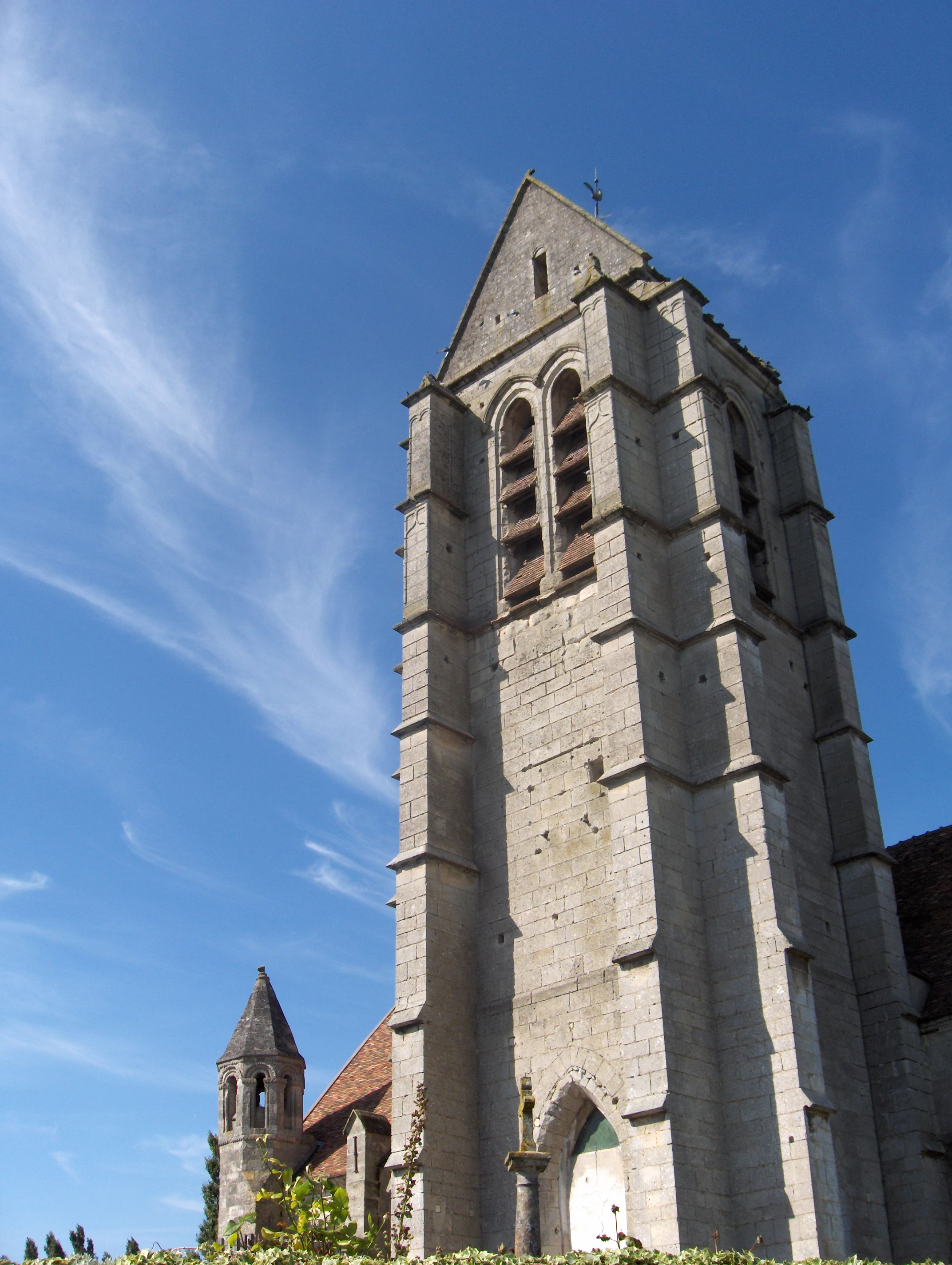
- The bell tower of the church of the Assumption, in Haravilliers
- Location of Haravilliers
- Location within France Location within Île-de-France (region)
- Coordinates: 49°10′27″N 2°03′20″E
- Country: France
- Region: Île-de-France
- Department: Val-d'Oise
- Arrondissement: Pontoise
- Canton: Pontoise

Government
  - Mayor (2020–2026): Michel Razafimbelo
- Area^{1}: 10.90 km^{2} (4.21 sq mi)
- Highest elevation: 217 m (712 ft)
- Lowest elevation: 99 m (325 ft)
- Population (2023): 589
  - Density: 54.0/km^{2} (140/sq mi)
- Time zone: UTC+01:00 (CET)
  - Summer (DST): UTC+02:00 (CEST)
- INSEE/Postal code: 95298 /95640
- ^{1} French Land Register data, which excludes lakes, ponds, glaciers > 1 km^{2} (0.386 sq mi or 247 acres) and river estuaries.

Haravilliers (French pronunciation: [aʁavilje]) is a commune in the Val-d'Oise department in Île-de-France in northern France.

== Geography ==
=== Climate ===
Haravilliers has an oceanic climate (Köppen climate classification Cfb). The average annual temperature in Haravilliers is 10.9 °C (51.6 °F). The average annual rainfall is 676.8 mm (26.65 in) with December as the wettest month. The temperatures are highest on average in August, at around 18.9 °C (66.0 °F), and lowest in January, at around 3.7 °C (38.7 °F). The highest temperature ever recorded in Haravilliers was 38.5 °C (101.3 °F) on 12 August 2003; the coldest temperature ever recorded was −13.7 °C (7.3 °F) on 7 February 1991.

Climate data for Haravilliers (1981−2010 normals, extremes 1990−2010)
Month	Jan	Feb	Mar	Apr	May	Jun	Jul	Aug	Sep	Oct	Nov	Dec	Year
Record high °C (°F)	14.7 (58.5)	19.1 (66.4)	21.4 (70.5)	26.0 (78.8)	30.1 (86.2)	32.8 (91.0)	36.1 (97.0)	38.5 (101.3)	30.9 (87.6)	25.2 (77.4)	18.1 (64.6)	16.3 (61.3)	38.5 (101.3)
Mean daily maximum °C (°F)	6.0 (42.8)	7.4 (45.3)	11.1 (52.0)	14.1 (57.4)	18.3 (64.9)	21.2 (70.2)	23.9 (75.0)	24.2 (75.6)	19.9 (67.8)	15.0 (59.0)	9.5 (49.1)	6.0 (42.8)	14.8 (58.6)
Daily mean °C (°F)	3.7 (38.7)	4.6 (40.3)	7.4 (45.3)	9.8 (49.6)	13.5 (56.3)	16.2 (61.2)	18.5 (65.3)	18.9 (66.0)	15.3 (59.5)	11.5 (52.7)	6.9 (44.4)	3.8 (38.8)	10.9 (51.6)
Mean daily minimum °C (°F)	1.4 (34.5)	1.7 (35.1)	3.7 (38.7)	5.4 (41.7)	8.7 (47.7)	11.2 (52.2)	13.2 (55.8)	13.6 (56.5)	10.7 (51.3)	8.0 (46.4)	4.3 (39.7)	1.7 (35.1)	7.0 (44.6)
Record low °C (°F)	−13.7 (7.3)	−13.7 (7.3)	−8.1 (17.4)	−2.9 (26.8)	−0.7 (30.7)	2.3 (36.1)	6.2 (43.2)	6.8 (44.2)	4.2 (39.6)	−2.9 (26.8)	−8.4 (16.9)	−11.3 (11.7)	−13.7 (7.3)
Average precipitation mm (inches)	54.1 (2.13)	46.9 (1.85)	49.6 (1.95)	54.7 (2.15)	59.2 (2.33)	61.0 (2.40)	58.9 (2.32)	54.5 (2.15)	46.3 (1.82)	64.5 (2.54)	58.3 (2.30)	68.8 (2.71)	676.8 (26.65)
Average precipitation days (≥ 1.0 mm)	10.0	10.4	9.8	9.7	9.7	9.3	8.8	8.2	7.7	10.5	11.3	11.9	116.9
Source: Météo-France

== See also ==
- Communes of the Val-d'Oise department
