= Cormeilles-en-Vexin =

- Commune
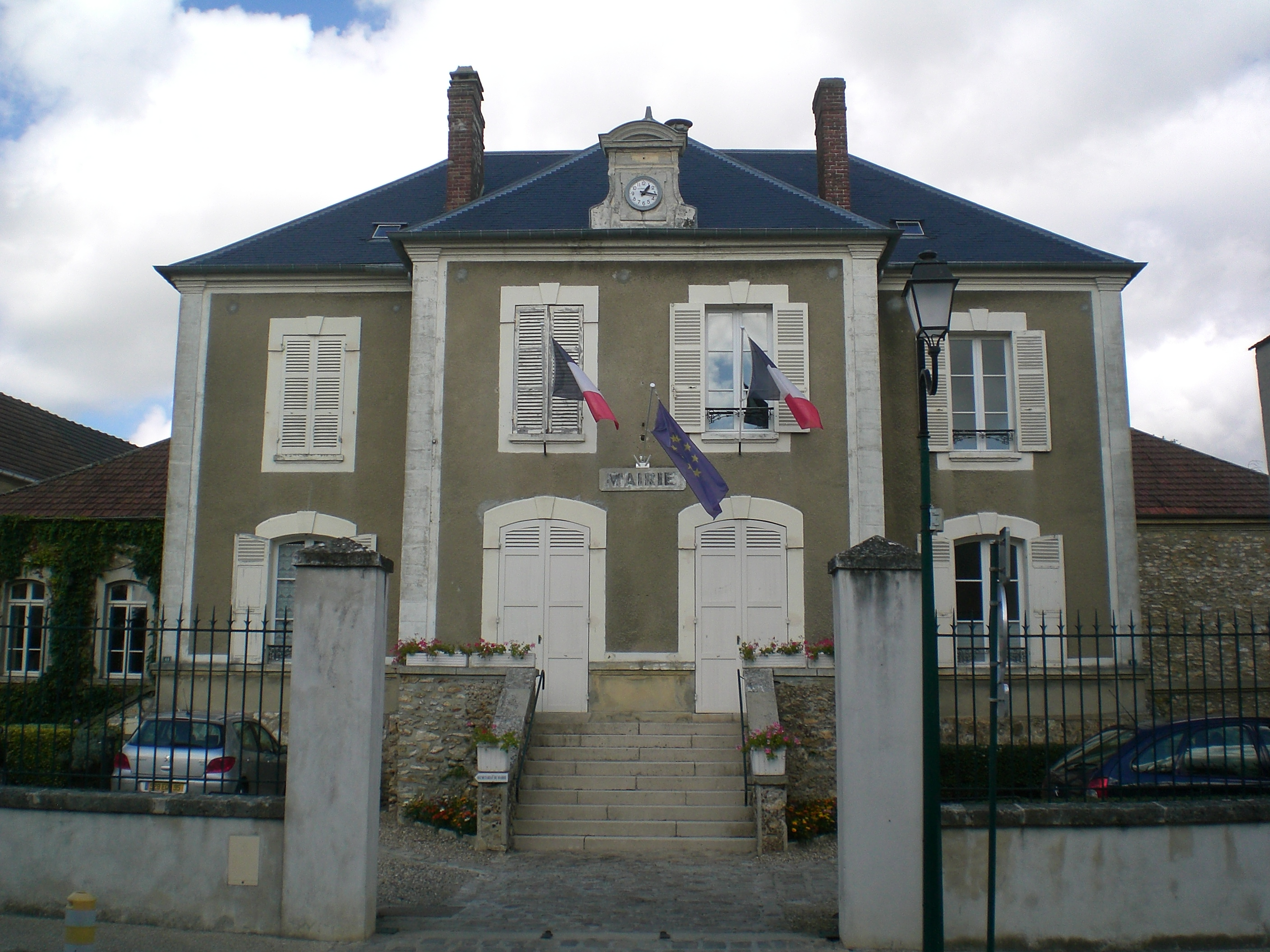
- The town hall of Cormeilles-en-Vexin

- Coat of arms
- Location of Cormeilles-en-Vexin
- Location within France Location within Île-de-France (region)
- Coordinates: 49°07′00″N 2°01′18″E
- Country: France
- Region: Île-de-France
- Department: Val-d'Oise
- Arrondissement: Pontoise
- Canton: Pontoise

Government
  - Mayor (2020–2026): Christine Beis
- Area^{1}: 9.56 km^{2} (3.69 sq mi)
- Highest elevation: 164 m (538 ft)
- Lowest elevation: 87 m (285 ft)
- Population (2023): 1,297
  - Density: 136/km^{2} (351/sq mi)
- Time zone: UTC+01:00 (CET)
  - Summer (DST): UTC+02:00 (CEST)
- INSEE/Postal code: 95177 /95830
- ^{1} French Land Register data, which excludes lakes, ponds, glaciers > 1 km^{2} (0.386 sq mi or 247 acres) and river estuaries.

Cormeilles-en-Vexin (French pronunciation: [kɔʁmɛj ɑ̃ vɛksɛ̃], literally Cormeilles in Vexin) is a commune in the Val-d'Oise department in Île-de-France in north-central France.

== Education ==
The commune has a single combined preschool (maternelle) and elementary school, Ecole Jean Jaurès.

== Demography ==
Historical population
Year	Pop.	±% p.a.
1968	664	—
1975	729	+1.34%
1982	761	+0.62%
1990	802	+0.66%
1999	863	+0.82%
2007	977	+1.56%
2012	1,186	+3.95%
2017	1,402	+3.40%
2023	1,297	−1.29%
Source: INSEE

== See also ==
- Communes of the Val-d'Oise department
