= Grisy-les-Plâtres =

- Commune
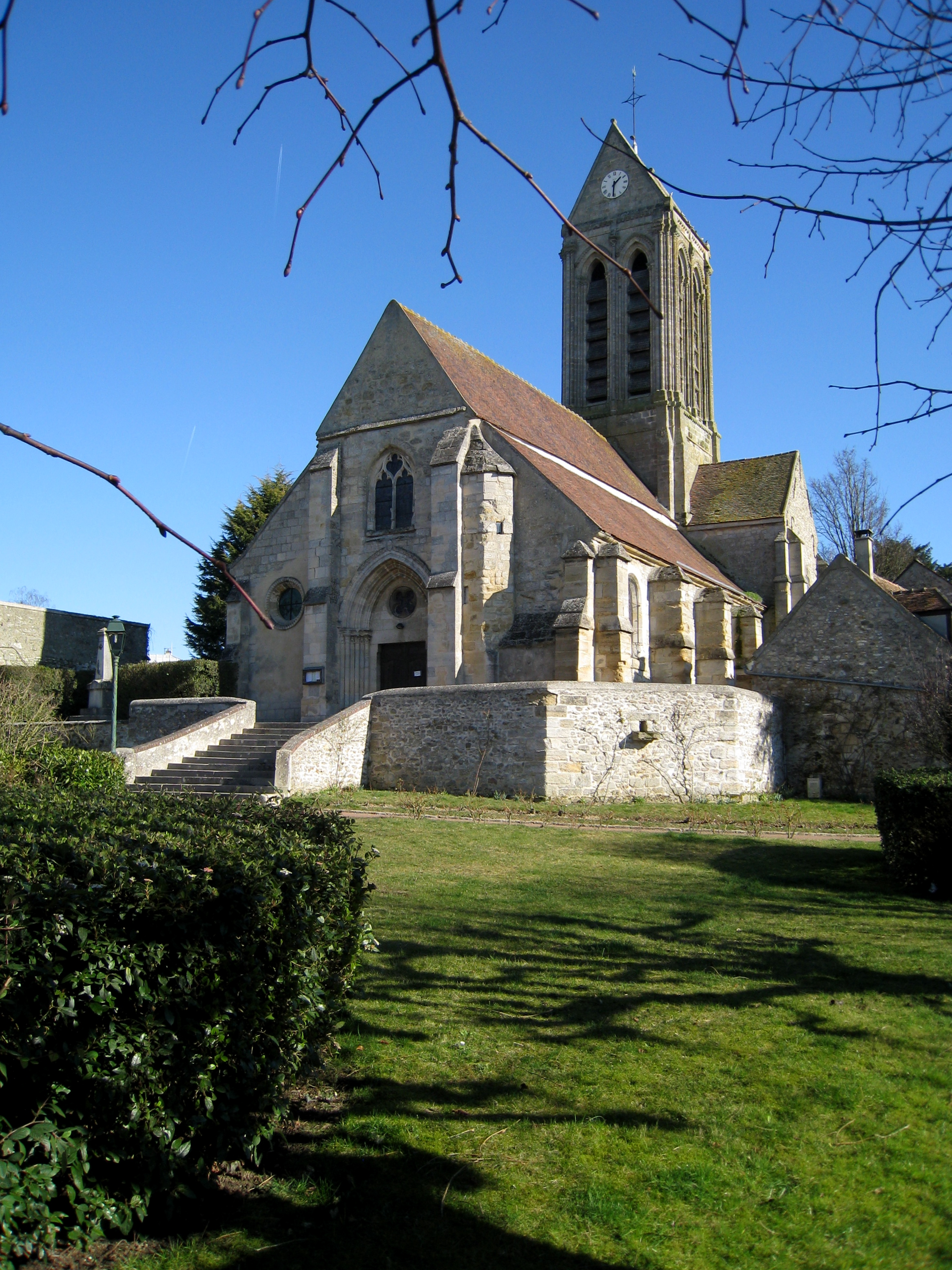
- The church of Saint-Caprais, in Grisy-les-Plâtres

- Coat of arms
- Location of Grisy-les-Plâtres
- Location within France Location within Île-de-France (region)
- Coordinates: 49°07′58″N 2°03′01″E
- Country: France
- Region: Île-de-France
- Department: Val-d'Oise
- Arrondissement: Pontoise
- Canton: Pontoise

Government
  - Mayor (2020–2026): Catherine Carpentier
- Area^{1}: 7.15 km^{2} (2.76 sq mi)
- Highest elevation: 185 m (607 ft)
- Lowest elevation: 67 m (220 ft)
- Population (2023): 709
  - Density: 99.2/km^{2} (257/sq mi)
- Time zone: UTC+01:00 (CET)
  - Summer (DST): UTC+02:00 (CEST)
- INSEE/Postal code: 95287 /95810
- ^{1} French Land Register data, which excludes lakes, ponds, glaciers > 1 km^{2} (0.386 sq mi or 247 acres) and river estuaries.

Grisy-les-Plâtres (French pronunciation: [ɡʁizi le platʁ]) is a commune in the Val-d'Oise department in Île-de-France in northern France. The commune has a resident population of 694 (2019).

== See also ==
- Communes of the Val-d'Oise department
