= Le Bellay-en-Vexin =

- Commune
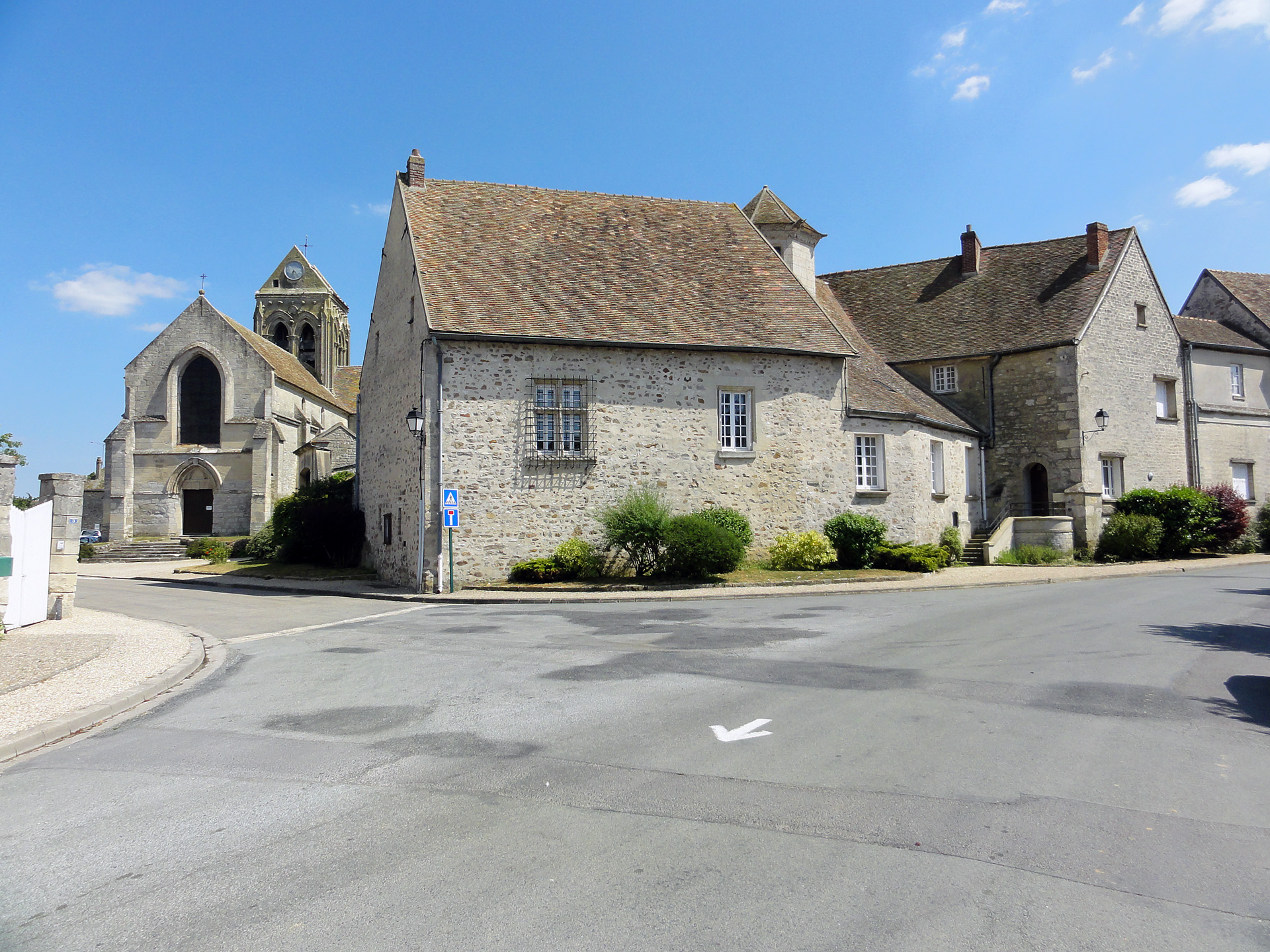
- The Hôtel-Dieu and the church of Sainte-Marie-Madeleine, in Le Bellay-en-Vexin

- Coat of arms
- Location of Le Bellay-en-Vexin
- Location within France Location within Île-de-France (region)
- Coordinates: 49°09′07″N 1°53′14″E
- Country: France
- Region: Île-de-France
- Department: Val-d'Oise
- Arrondissement: Pontoise
- Canton: Pontoise
- Intercommunality: Vexin Centre

Government
  - Mayor (2020–2026): Ludovic Bazot
- Area^{1}: 5.02 km^{2} (1.94 sq mi)
- Highest elevation: 130 m (430 ft)
- Lowest elevation: 103 m (338 ft)
- Population (2023): 224
  - Density: 44.6/km^{2} (116/sq mi)
- Time zone: UTC+01:00 (CET)
  - Summer (DST): UTC+02:00 (CEST)
- INSEE/Postal code: 95054 /95750
- ^{1} French Land Register data, which excludes lakes, ponds, glaciers > 1 km^{2} (0.386 sq mi or 247 acres) and river estuaries.

Le Bellay-en-Vexin (French pronunciation: [lə bɛlɛ ɑ̃ vɛksɛ̃], literally Le Bellay in Vexin) is a commune in the Val-d'Oise department in Île-de-France in northern France.

== See also ==
- Communes of the Val-d'Oise department
