= Nucourt =

- Commune
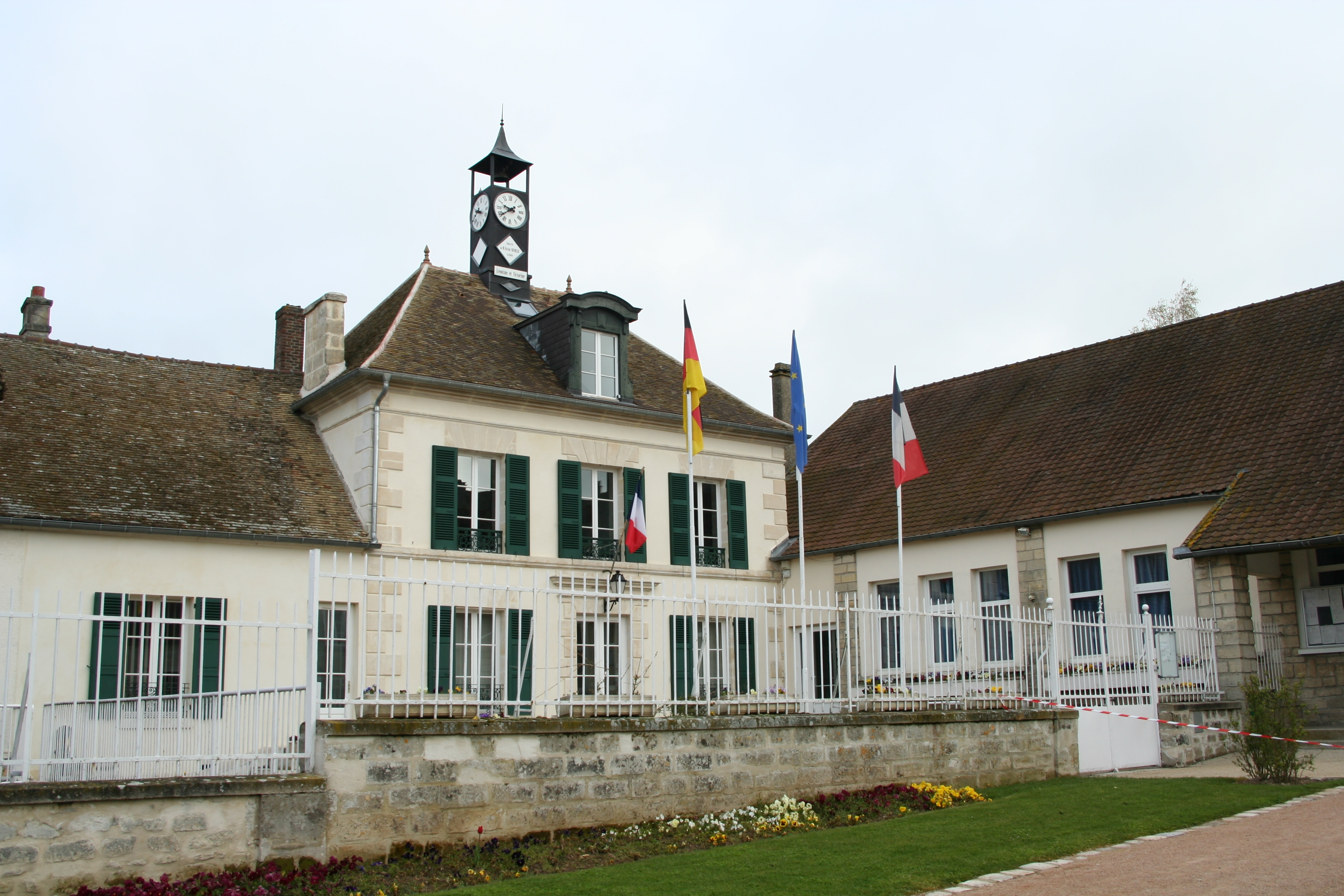
- The town hall in Nucourt

- Coat of arms
- Location of Nucourt
- Location within France Location within Île-de-France (region)
- Coordinates: 49°09′34″N 1°51′18″E
- Country: France
- Region: Île-de-France
- Department: Val-d'Oise
- Arrondissement: Pontoise
- Canton: Pontoise

Government
  - Mayor (2020–2026): Émilie Vallet
- Area^{1}: 7.65 km^{2} (2.95 sq mi)
- Highest elevation: 137 m (449 ft)
- Lowest elevation: 85 m (279 ft)
- Population (2023): 719
  - Density: 94.0/km^{2} (243/sq mi)
- Time zone: UTC+01:00 (CET)
  - Summer (DST): UTC+02:00 (CEST)
- INSEE/Postal code: 95459 /95420
- ^{1} French Land Register data, which excludes lakes, ponds, glaciers > 1 km^{2} (0.386 sq mi or 247 acres) and river estuaries.

Nucourt (French pronunciation: [nykuʁ]) is one of the communes of the Val-d'Oise department in the Île-de-France region of northern France. It is the location of limestone caves which were used as a World War II V-1 flying bomb storage depot.
