= Livilliers =

- Commune
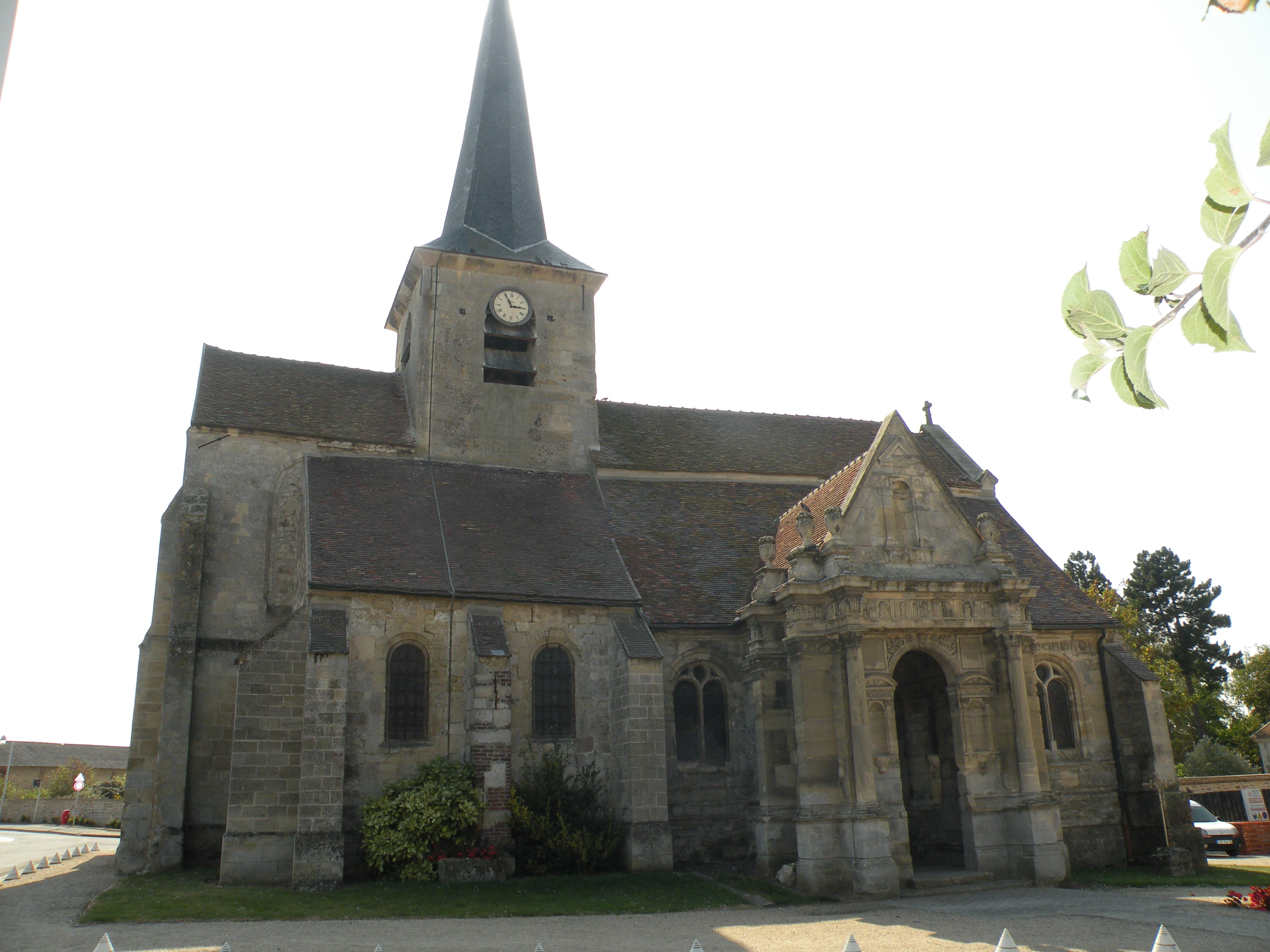
- The church of Our Lady, in Livilliers

- Coat of arms
- Location of Livilliers
- Location within France Location within Île-de-France (region)
- Coordinates: 49°05′46″N 2°05′43″E
- Country: France
- Region: Île-de-France
- Department: Val-d'Oise
- Arrondissement: Pontoise
- Canton: Pontoise
- Intercommunality: CC Sausseron Impressionnistes

Government
  - Mayor (2023–2026): François Danconnier
- Area^{1}: 6.53 km^{2} (2.52 sq mi)
- Highest elevation: 115 m (377 ft)
- Lowest elevation: 69 m (226 ft)
- Population (2023): 389
  - Density: 59.6/km^{2} (154/sq mi)
- Time zone: UTC+01:00 (CET)
  - Summer (DST): UTC+02:00 (CEST)
- INSEE/Postal code: 95341 /95300
- ^{1} French Land Register data, which excludes lakes, ponds, glaciers > 1 km^{2} (0.386 sq mi or 247 acres) and river estuaries.

Livilliers (French pronunciation: [livilje]) is a commune in the Val-d'Oise department in Île-de-France in northern France.

== See also ==
- Communes of the Val-d'Oise department
