= Génicourt =

- Commune
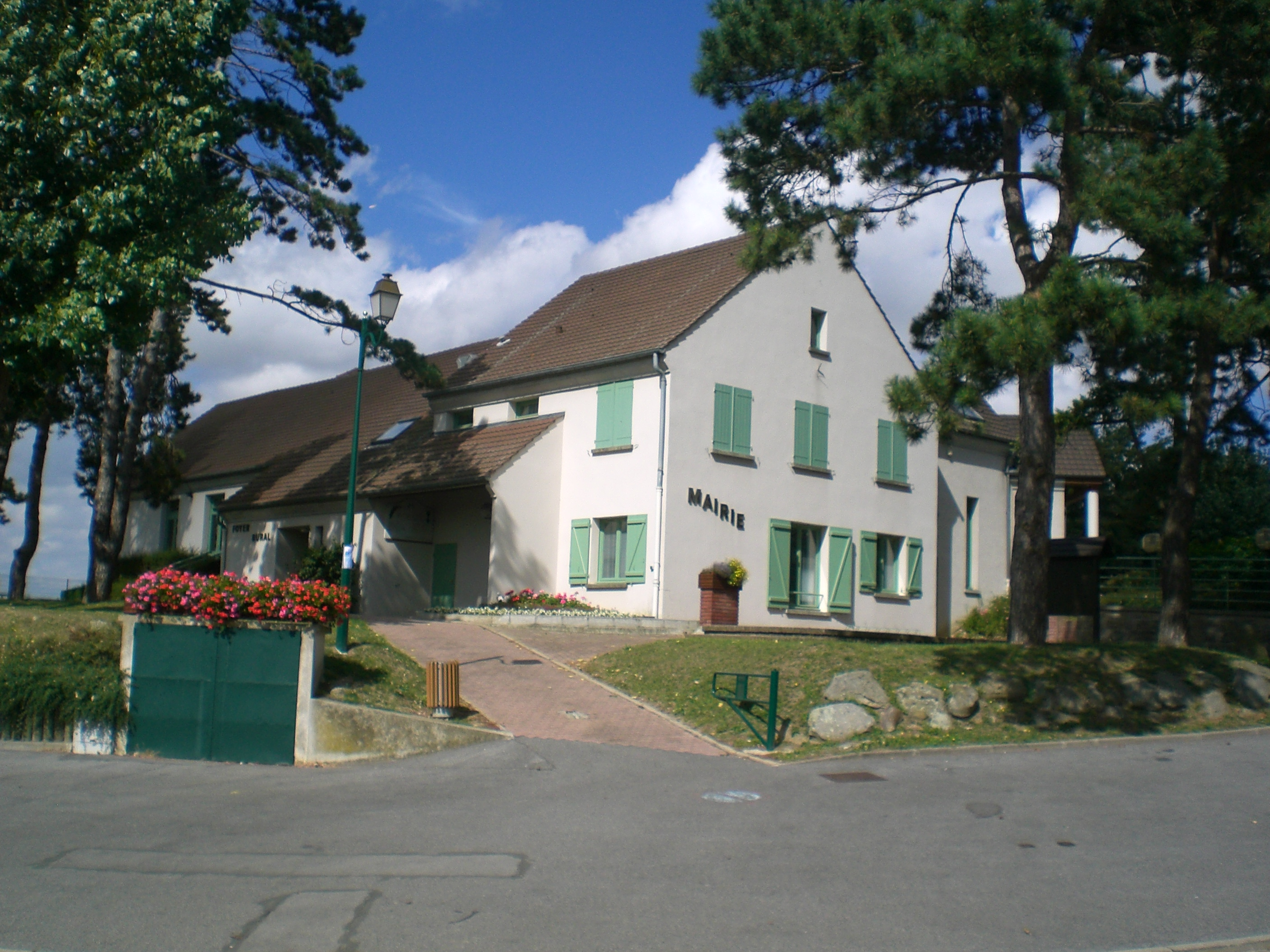
- The town hall of Génicourt

- Coat of arms
- Location of Génicourt
- Location within France Location within Île-de-France (region)
- Coordinates: 49°05′23″N 2°04′09″E
- Country: France
- Region: Île-de-France
- Department: Val-d'Oise
- Arrondissement: Pontoise
- Canton: Pontoise

Government
  - Mayor (2020–2026): Olivier Deslandes
- Area^{1}: 6.44 km^{2} (2.49 sq mi)
- Highest elevation: 106 m (348 ft)
- Lowest elevation: 68 m (223 ft)
- Population (2023): 514
  - Density: 79.8/km^{2} (207/sq mi)
- Time zone: UTC+01:00 (CET)
  - Summer (DST): UTC+02:00 (CEST)
- INSEE/Postal code: 95271 /95650
- ^{1} French Land Register data, which excludes lakes, ponds, glaciers > 1 km^{2} (0.386 sq mi or 247 acres) and river estuaries.

Génicourt (French pronunciation: [ʒenikuʁ]) is a commune in the Val-d'Oise department in Île-de-France in northern France.

== See also ==
- Communes of the Val-d'Oise department
