= Frémécourt =

- Commune
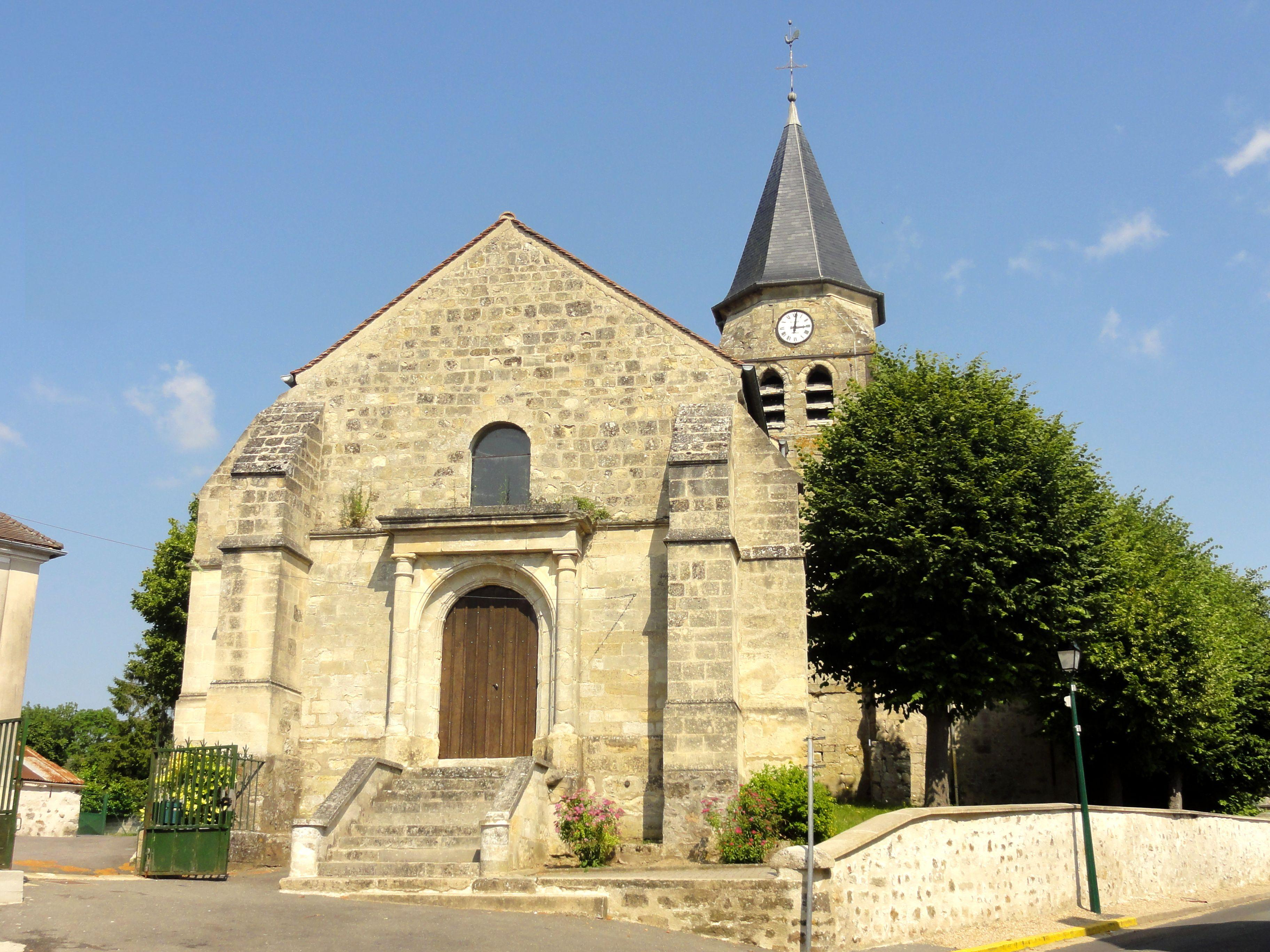
- The church of Our Lady of the Assumption, in Frémécourt

- Coat of arms
- Location of Frémécourt
- Location within France Location within Île-de-France (region)
- Coordinates: 49°07′15″N 2°00′05″E
- Country: France
- Region: Île-de-France
- Department: Val-d'Oise
- Arrondissement: Pontoise
- Canton: Pontoise

Government
  - Mayor (2020–2026): Stéphane Balan
- Area^{1}: 4.28 km^{2} (1.65 sq mi)
- Highest elevation: 168 m (551 ft)
- Lowest elevation: 80 m (260 ft)
- Population (2023): 526
  - Density: 123/km^{2} (318/sq mi)
- Time zone: UTC+01:00 (CET)
  - Summer (DST): UTC+02:00 (CEST)
- INSEE/Postal code: 95254 /95830
- ^{1} French Land Register data, which excludes lakes, ponds, glaciers > 1 km^{2} (0.386 sq mi or 247 acres) and river estuaries.

Frémécourt (French pronunciation: [fʁemekuʁ]) is a commune in the Val-d'Oise department in Île-de-France in northern France.

== See also ==
- Communes of the Val-d'Oise department
