= Moussy, Val-d'Oise =

Moussy
- Commune
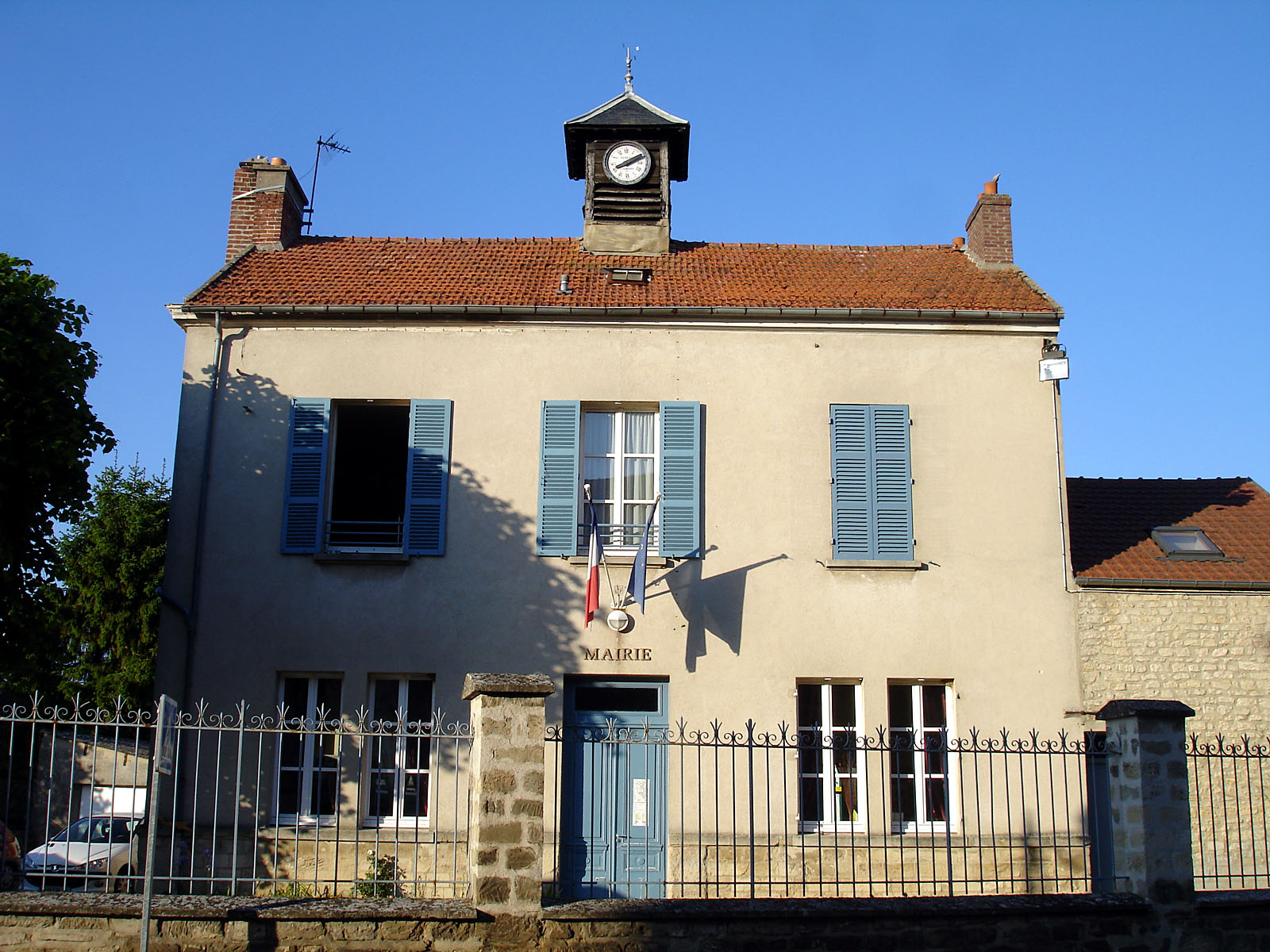
- The town hall of Moussy

- Coat of arms
- Location of Moussy
- Location within France Location within Île-de-France (region)
- Coordinates: 49°08′20″N 1°54′38″E
- Country: France
- Region: Île-de-France
- Department: Val-d'Oise
- Arrondissement: Pontoise
- Canton: Pontoise

Government
  - Mayor (2020–2026): Philippe Houdaille
- Area^{1}: 4.75 km^{2} (1.83 sq mi)
- Highest elevation: 112 m (367 ft)
- Lowest elevation: 56 m (184 ft)
- Population (2023): 108
  - Density: 22.7/km^{2} (58.9/sq mi)
- Time zone: UTC+01:00 (CET)
  - Summer (DST): UTC+02:00 (CEST)
- INSEE/Postal code: 95438 /95640
- ^{1} French Land Register data, which excludes lakes, ponds, glaciers > 1 km^{2} (0.386 sq mi or 247 acres) and river estuaries.

Moussy (French pronunciation: [musi]) is a commune in the Val-d'Oise department in Île-de-France in northern France.

== See also ==
- Communes of the Val-d'Oise department
