= Épiais-Rhus =

- Commune
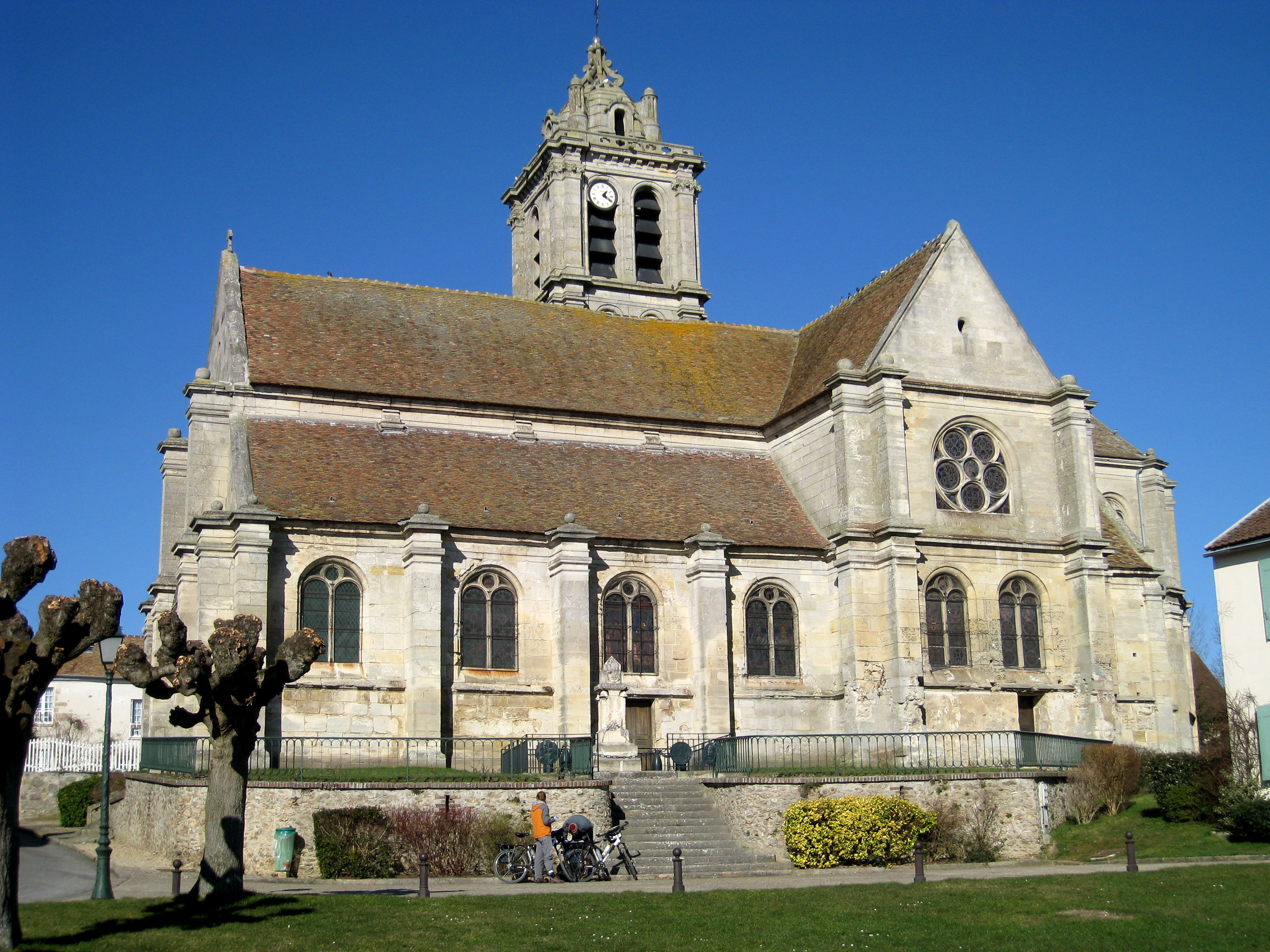
- The church, southern side
- Location of Épiais-Rhus
- Location within France Location within Île-de-France (region)
- Coordinates: 49°07′22″N 2°03′46″E
- Country: France
- Region: Île-de-France
- Department: Val-d'Oise
- Arrondissement: Pontoise
- Canton: Pontoise
- Intercommunality: CC Sausseron Impressionnistes

Government
  - Mayor (2020–2026): Brahim Moha
- Area^{1}: 10.46 km^{2} (4.04 sq mi)
- Highest elevation: 186 m (610 ft)
- Lowest elevation: 56 m (184 ft)
- Population (2023): 603
  - Density: 57.6/km^{2} (149/sq mi)
- Time zone: UTC+01:00 (CET)
  - Summer (DST): UTC+02:00 (CEST)
- INSEE/Postal code: 95213 /95810
- ^{1} French Land Register data, which excludes lakes, ponds, glaciers > 1 km^{2} (0.386 sq mi or 247 acres) and river estuaries.

Épiais-Rhus (French pronunciation: [epjɛ ʁy]) is a commune in the Val-d'Oise department and Île-de-France region of France.

== See also ==
- Communes of the Val-d'Oise department
