= Ennery, Val-d'Oise =

Ennery
- Commune
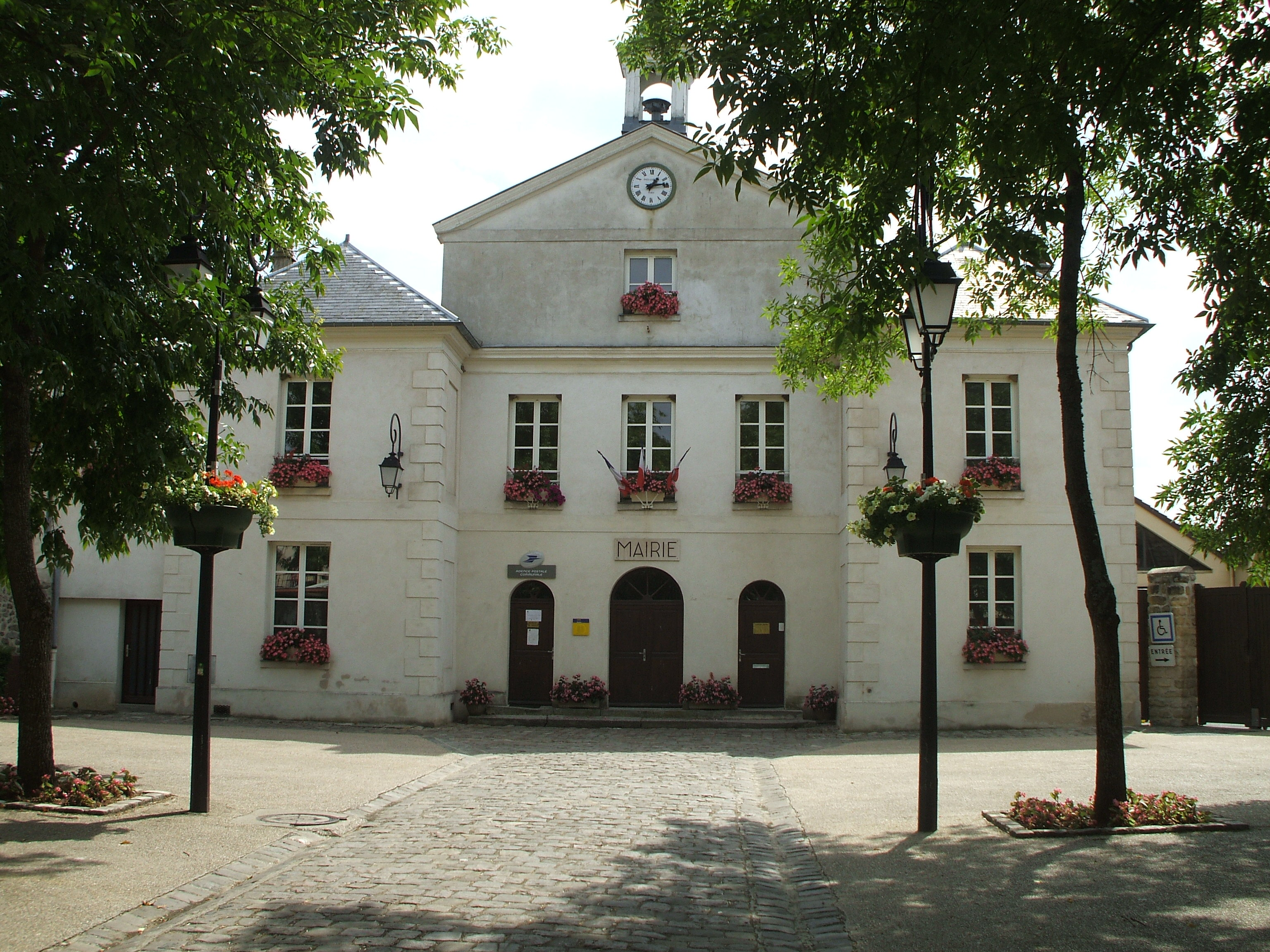
- The town hall in Ennery

- Coat of arms
- Location of Ennery
- Location within France Location within Île-de-France (region)
- Coordinates: 49°04′31″N 2°06′25″E
- Country: France
- Region: Île-de-France
- Department: Val-d'Oise
- Arrondissement: Pontoise
- Canton: Pontoise
- Intercommunality: CC Sausseron Impressionnistes

Government
  - Mayor (2021–2026): Matthieu Laurent
- Area^{1}: 7.43 km^{2} (2.87 sq mi)
- Highest elevation: 104 m (341 ft)
- Lowest elevation: 32 m (105 ft)
- Population (2023): 2,243
  - Density: 302/km^{2} (782/sq mi)
- Time zone: UTC+01:00 (CET)
  - Summer (DST): UTC+02:00 (CEST)
- INSEE/Postal code: 95211 /95300
- ^{1} French Land Register data, which excludes lakes, ponds, glaciers > 1 km^{2} (0.386 sq mi or 247 acres) and river estuaries.

Ennery (French pronunciation: [ɛnʁi]) is a commune in the Val-d'Oise department in Île-de-France in northern France.

== Population ==
Historical population
Year	Pop.	±% p.a.
1968	1,369	—
1975	1,920	+4.95%
1982	1,831	−0.68%
1990	2,021	+1.24%
1999	2,036	+0.08%
2007	2,137	+0.61%
2012	2,293	+1.42%
2017	2,430	+1.17%
2023	2,243	−1.33%
Source: INSEE

== See also ==
- Communes of the Val-d'Oise department
