= Bréançon =

- Commune
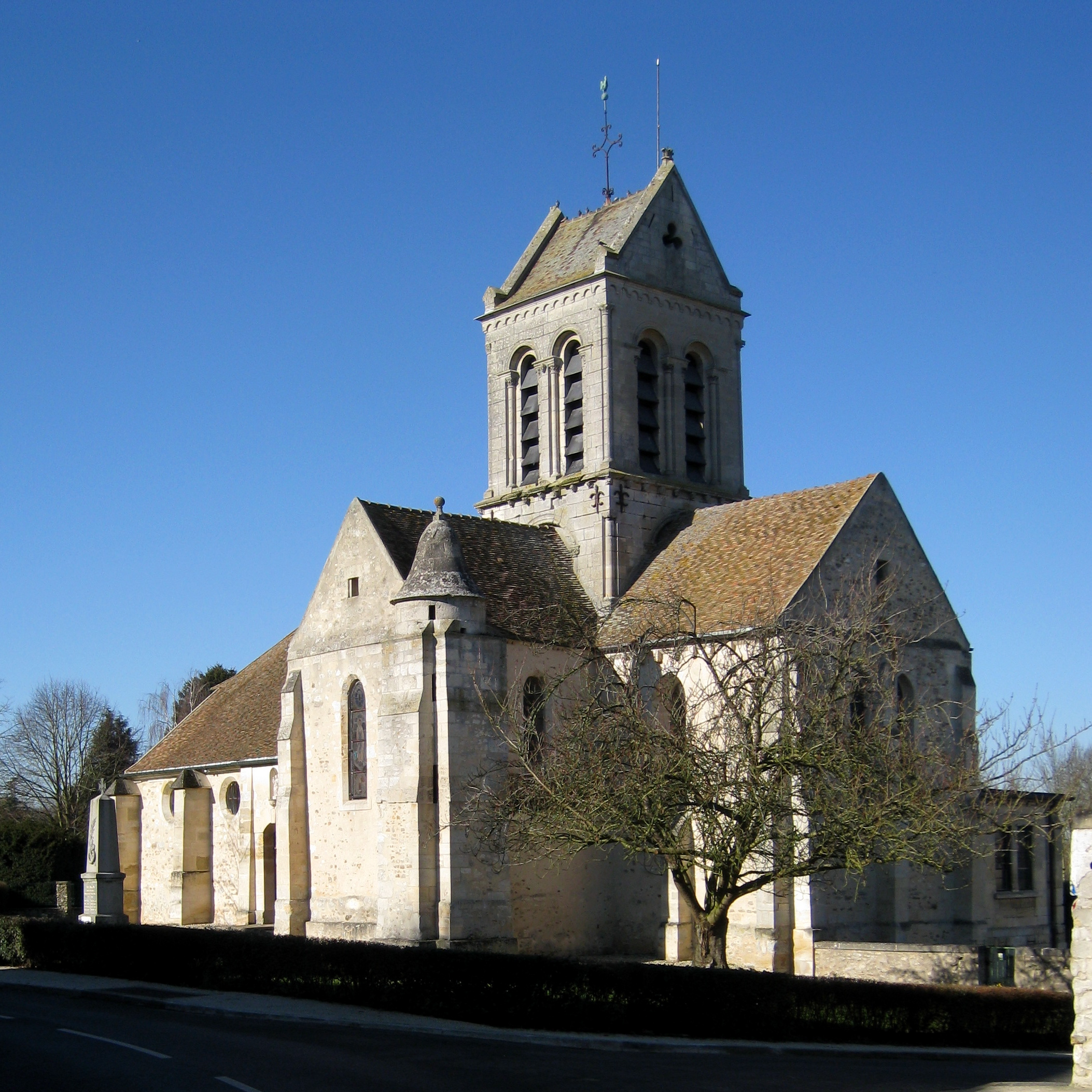
- Saint Crépin-Saint Crépinien
- Location of Bréançon
- Location within France Location within Île-de-France (region)
- Coordinates: 49°08′35″N 2°01′20″E
- Country: France
- Region: Île-de-France
- Department: Val-d'Oise
- Arrondissement: Pontoise
- Canton: Pontoise
- Intercommunality: CC Vexin Centre

Government
  - Mayor (2020–2026): Gilles Molland
- Area^{1}: 10.61 km^{2} (4.10 sq mi)
- Highest elevation: 203 m (666 ft)
- Lowest elevation: 79 m (259 ft)
- Population (2023): 432
  - Density: 40.7/km^{2} (105/sq mi)
- Time zone: UTC+01:00 (CET)
  - Summer (DST): UTC+02:00 (CEST)
- INSEE/Postal code: 95102 /95640
- ^{1} French Land Register data, which excludes lakes, ponds, glaciers > 1 km^{2} (0.386 sq mi or 247 acres) and river estuaries.

Bréançon (French pronunciation: [bʁeɑ̃sɔ̃]) is a commune in the Val-d'Oise department in Île-de-France in northern France.

== See also ==
- Communes of the Val-d'Oise department
