= Theuville, Val-d'Oise =

Theuville
- Commune
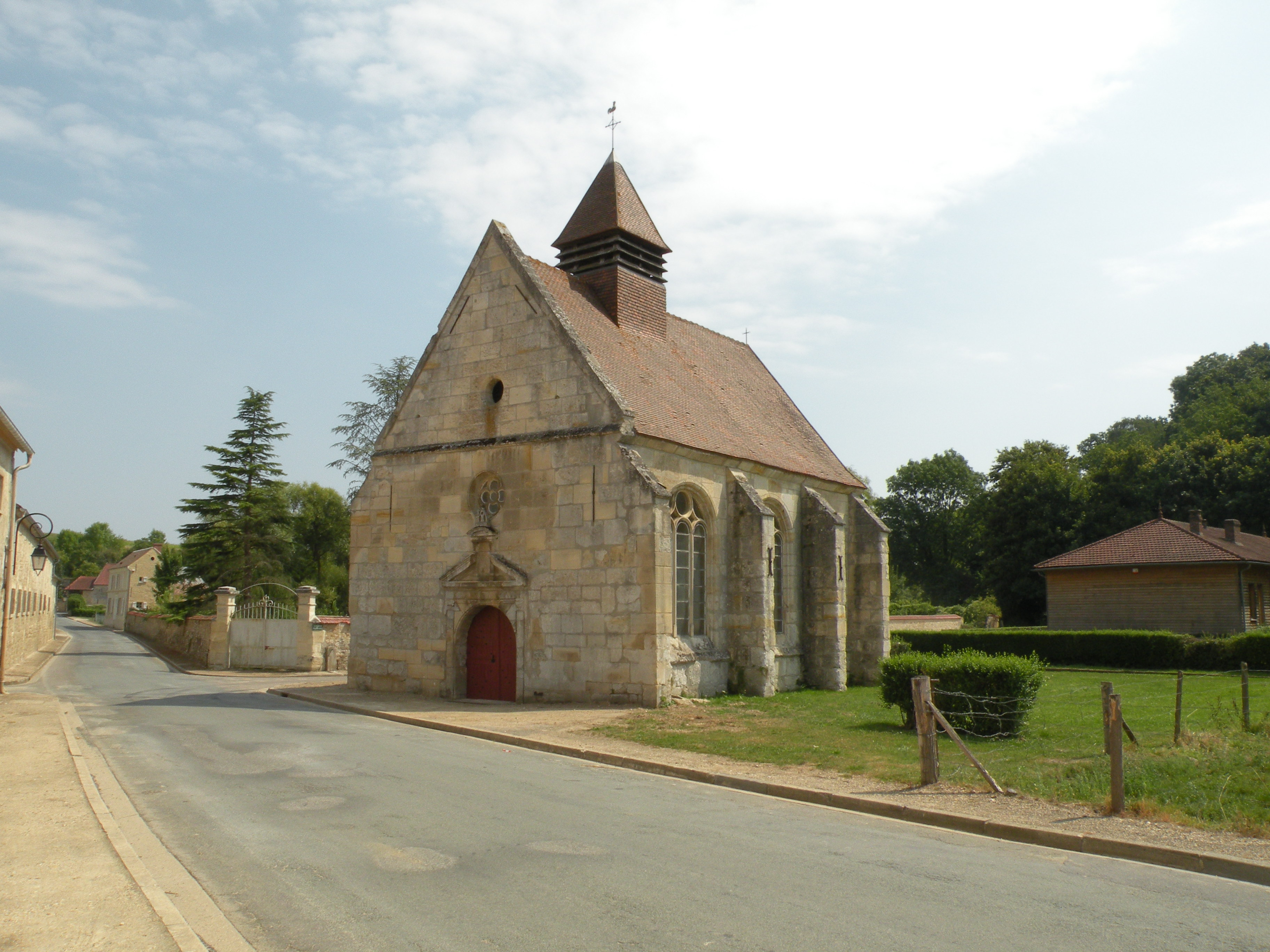
- The church in Theuville

- Coat of arms
- Location of Theuville
- Location within France Location within Île-de-France (region)
- Coordinates: 49°09′17″N 2°04′21″E
- Country: France
- Region: Île-de-France
- Department: Val-d'Oise
- Arrondissement: Pontoise
- Canton: Pontoise

Government
  - Mayor (2020–2026): Jeremy Penther
- Area^{1}: 4.97 km^{2} (1.92 sq mi)
- Highest elevation: 125 m (410 ft)
- Lowest elevation: 58 m (190 ft)
- Population (2023): 53
  - Density: 11/km^{2} (28/sq mi)
- Time zone: UTC+01:00 (CET)
  - Summer (DST): UTC+02:00 (CEST)
- INSEE/Postal code: 95611 /95810
- ^{1} French Land Register data, which excludes lakes, ponds, glaciers > 1 km^{2} (0.386 sq mi or 247 acres) and river estuaries.

Theuville (French pronunciation: [tøvil]) is a commune in the Val-d'Oise department in Île-de-France in northern France.

== See also ==
- Communes of the Val-d'Oise department
