= Santeuil, Val-d'Oise =

Santeuil
- Commune
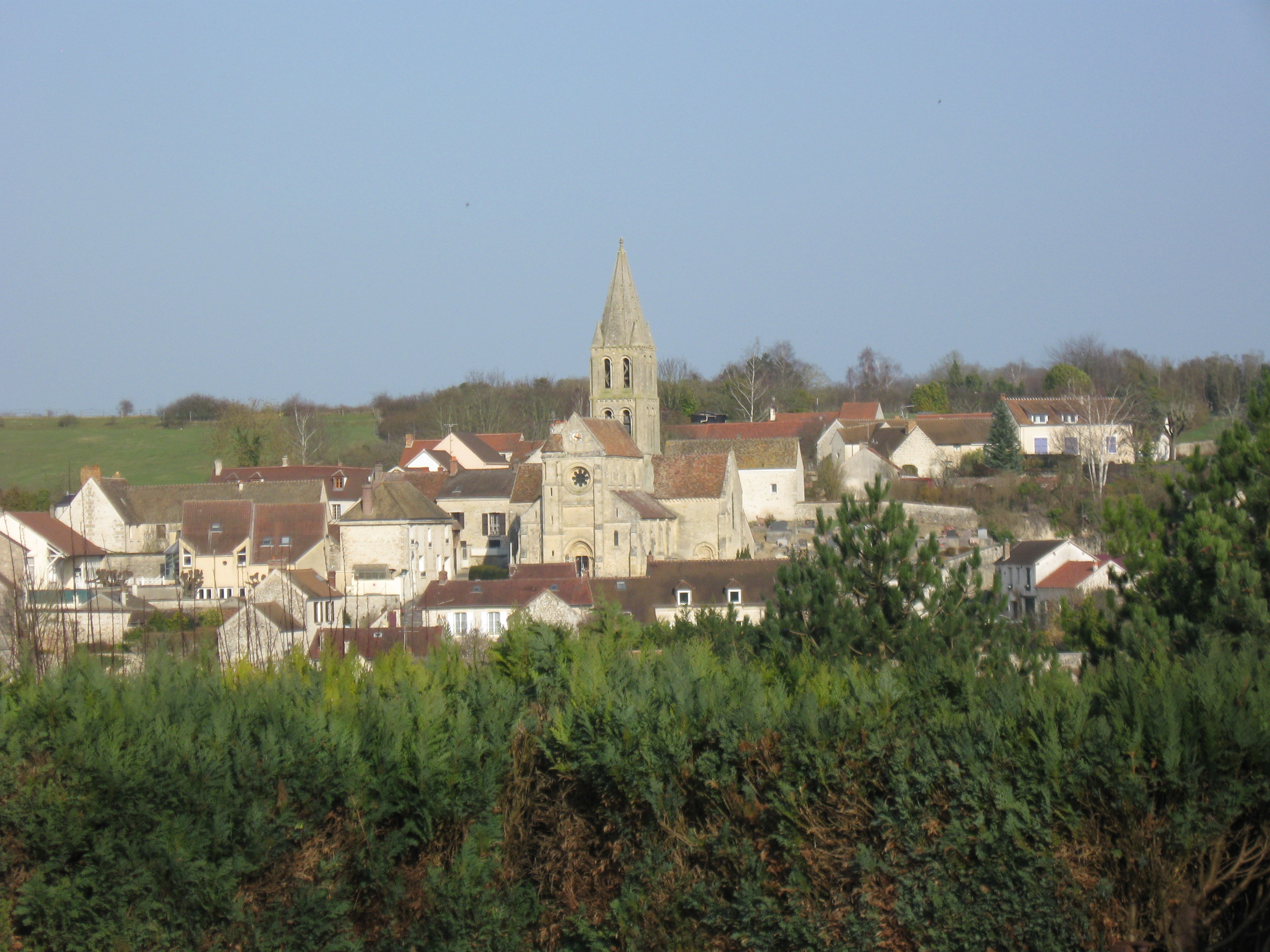
- A general view of Santeuil, with the church and surrounding buildings

- Coat of arms
- Location of Santeuil
- Location within France Location within Île-de-France (region)
- Coordinates: 49°07′35″N 1°57′08″E
- Country: France
- Region: Île-de-France
- Department: Val-d'Oise
- Arrondissement: Pontoise
- Canton: Pontoise

Government
  - Mayor (2021–2026): Florent Ambrosino
- Area^{1}: 5.34 km^{2} (2.06 sq mi)
- Highest elevation: 121 m (397 ft)
- Lowest elevation: 50 m (160 ft)
- Population (2023): 658
  - Density: 123/km^{2} (319/sq mi)
- Time zone: UTC+01:00 (CET)
  - Summer (DST): UTC+02:00 (CEST)
- INSEE/Postal code: 95584 /95640
- ^{1} French Land Register data, which excludes lakes, ponds, glaciers > 1 km^{2} (0.386 sq mi or 247 acres) and river estuaries.

Santeuil (French pronunciation: [sɑ̃tœj]) is a commune in the Val-d'Oise département in Île-de-France in northern France. Inhabitants are known as Santeuillais (male) or Santeuillaises (female).

== See also ==
- Communes of the Val-d'Oise department
