= Ableiges =

- Commune
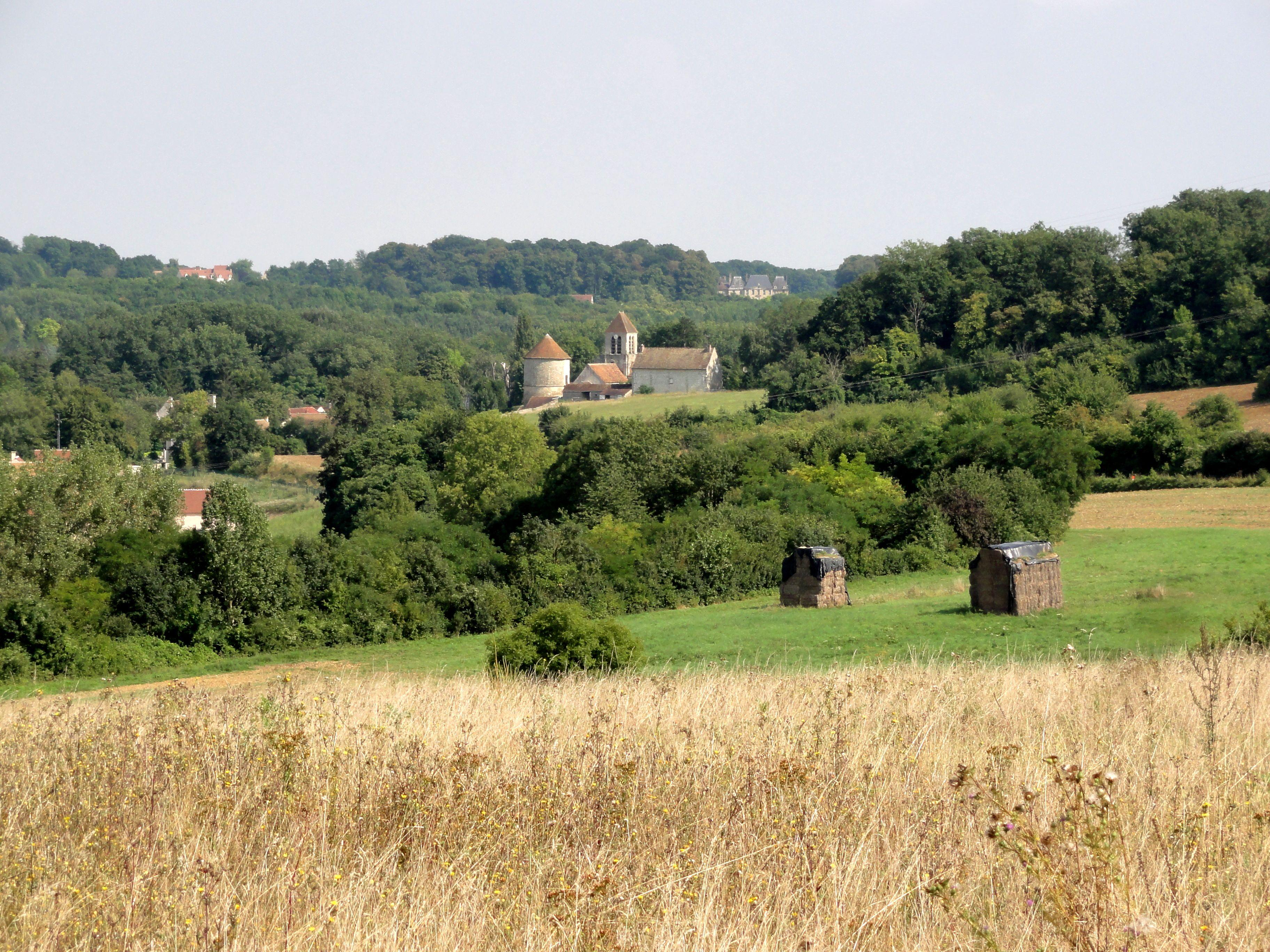
- View of the village

- Coat of arms
- Location of Ableiges
- Location within France Location within Île-de-France (region)
- Coordinates: 49°05′28″N 1°58′55″E
- Country: France
- Region: Île-de-France
- Department: Val-d'Oise
- Arrondissement: Pontoise
- Canton: Pontoise
- Intercommunality: Vexin Centre

Government
  - Mayor (2020–2026): Patrick Pelletier
- Area^{1}: 8.03 km^{2} (3.10 sq mi)
- Highest elevation: 128 m (420 ft)
- Lowest elevation: 40 m (130 ft)
- Population (2023): 1,108
  - Density: 138/km^{2} (357/sq mi)
- Demonym(s): Ableigeois, Ableigeoises
- Time zone: UTC+01:00 (CET)
  - Summer (DST): UTC+02:00 (CEST)
- INSEE/Postal code: 95002 /95450
- ^{1} French Land Register data, which excludes lakes, ponds, glaciers > 1 km^{2} (0.386 sq mi or 247 acres) and river estuaries.

Ableiges (French pronunciation: [ablɛʒ]) is a commune in the Val-d'Oise department in Île-de-France in northern France. It is located in the regional nature park of Vexin.

== Geography ==
Ableiges is located approximately 38 km from Paris.

== Population ==
Historical population

Year	Pop.	±% p.a.
1793	211	—
1821	175	−0.67%
1846	334	+2.62%
1872	327	−0.08%
1901	387	+0.58%
1926	419	+0.32%
1946	347	−0.94%
1954	410	+2.11%
1962	428	+0.54%

Year	Pop.	±% p.a.
1968	427	−0.04%
1975	505	+2.43%
1982	807	+6.93%
1990	900	+1.37%
1999	957	+0.68%
2007	946	−0.14%
2012	933	−0.28%
2017	1,161	+4.47%
2023	1,108	−0.78%

Source: EHESS (1793-1999) and INSEE

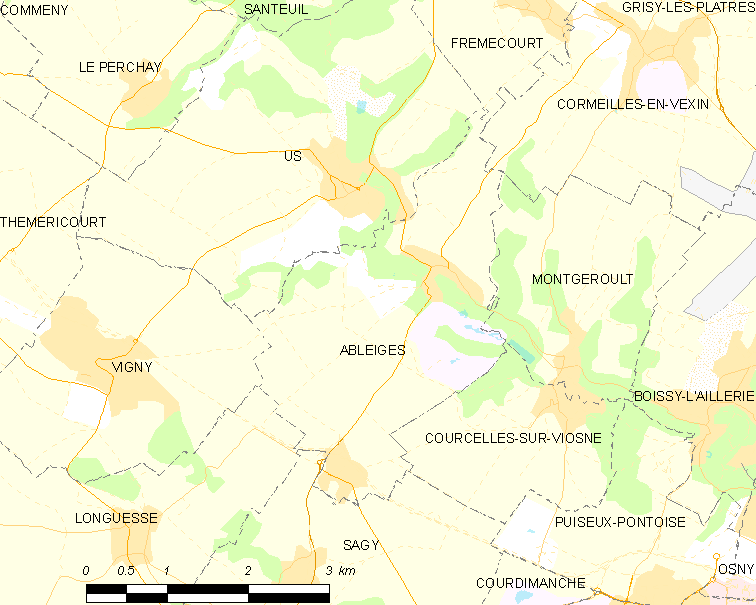
A map of the commune.

== See also ==
- Communes of the Val-d'Oise department
