= Chars =

- Commune
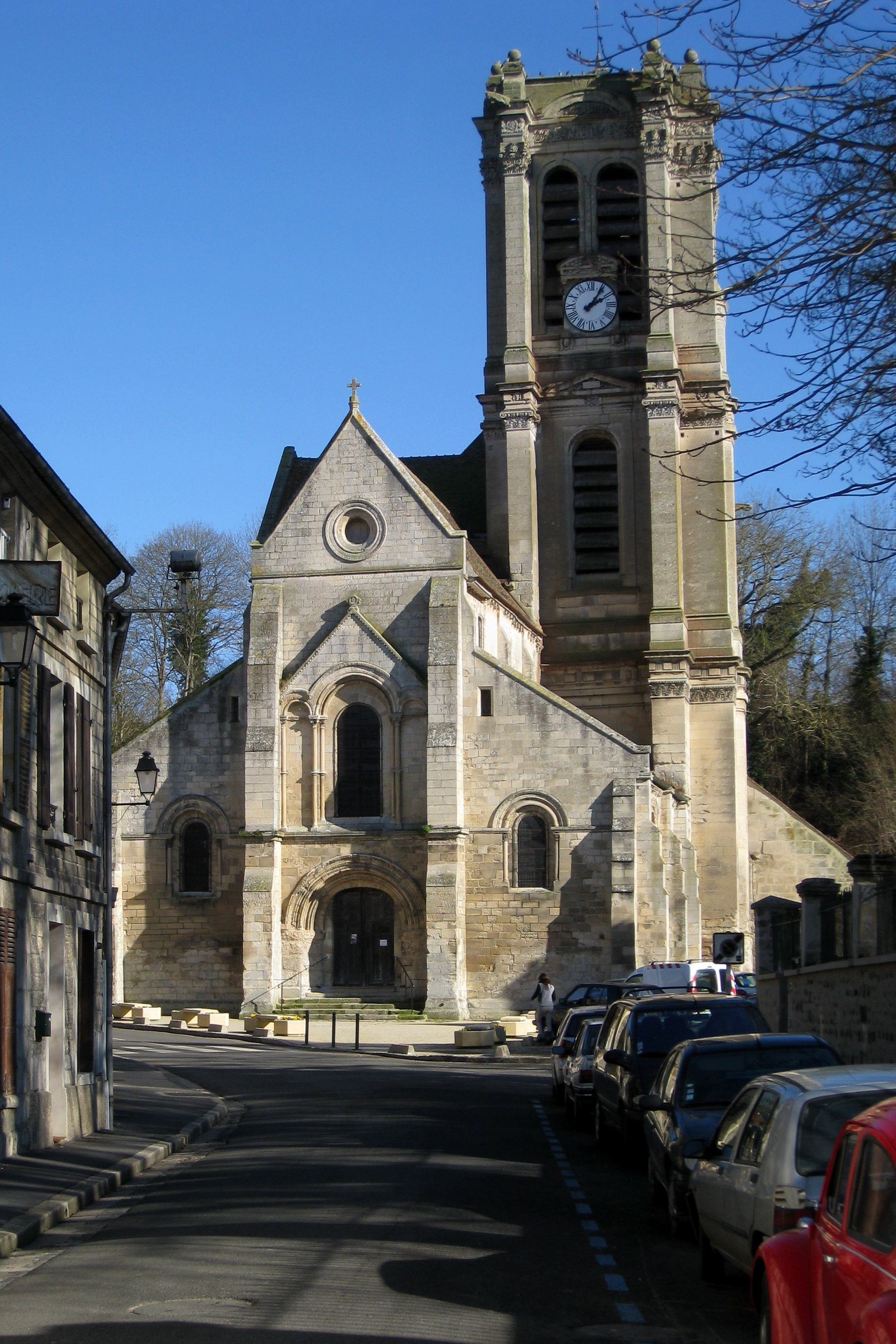
- The church in Chars

- Coat of arms
- Location of Chars
- Location within France Location within Île-de-France (region)
- Coordinates: 49°09′41″N 1°56′17″E
- Country: France
- Region: Île-de-France
- Department: Val-d'Oise
- Arrondissement: Pontoise
- Canton: Pontoise

Government
  - Mayor (2020–2026): Evelyne Bossu
- Area^{1}: 16.71 km^{2} (6.45 sq mi)
- Highest elevation: 174 m (571 ft)
- Lowest elevation: 55 m (180 ft)
- Population (2023): 2,006
  - Density: 120.0/km^{2} (310.9/sq mi)
- Time zone: UTC+01:00 (CET)
  - Summer (DST): UTC+02:00 (CEST)
- INSEE/Postal code: 95142 /95750
- ^{1} French Land Register data, which excludes lakes, ponds, glaciers > 1 km^{2} (0.386 sq mi or 247 acres) and river estuaries.

Chars (French pronunciation: [ʃaʁ]) is a commune in the Val-d'Oise department in Île-de-France in northern France. It is located in the regional nature park of Vexin.

== Population ==
Historical population
Year	Pop.	±% p.a.
1968	1,266	—
1975	1,435	+1.81%
1982	1,329	−1.09%
1990	1,519	+1.68%
1999	1,721	+1.40%
2007	1,772	+0.37%
2012	1,935	+1.78%
2017	2,110	+1.75%
2023	2,006	−0.84%
Source: INSEE

== Education ==
Chars has a single preschool, école maternelle des Tournesols, and a single elementary school, ecole elementaire de chars.

There is a vocational high school, Lycée professionnel régional du Vexin.

== See also ==
- Communes of the Val-d'Oise department
