= Maudet =

Maudet is a surname. Notable people with the surname include:

- Damien Maudet (born 1996), French politician
- Pierre Maudet (born 1978), Swiss and French politician

== See also ==
- Maudétour-en-Vexin
