= Wy-dit-Joli-Village =

- Commune
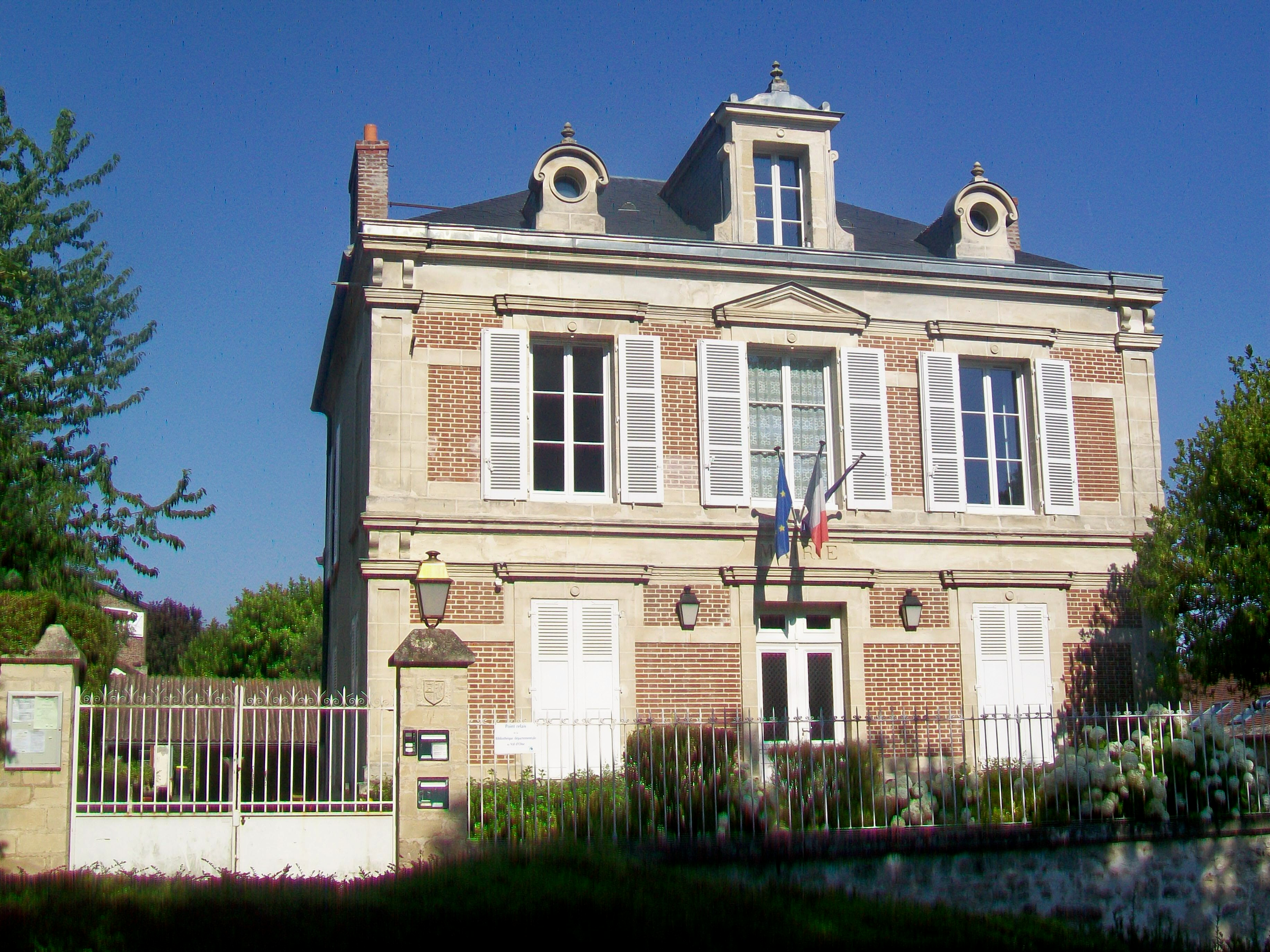
- The town hall of Wy-dit-Joli-Village

- Coat of arms
- Location of Wy-dit-Joli-Village
- Location within France Location within Île-de-France (region)
- Coordinates: 49°06′11″N 1°50′09″E
- Country: France
- Region: Île-de-France
- Department: Val-d'Oise
- Arrondissement: Pontoise
- Canton: Vauréal
- Intercommunality: CC Vexin - Val de Seine

Government
  - Mayor (2020–2026): Laurent Bossu
- Area^{1}: 8.37 km^{2} (3.23 sq mi)
- Elevation: 115 m (377 ft)
- Highest elevation: 199 m (653 ft)
- Lowest elevation: 99 m (325 ft)
- Population (2023): 326
  - Density: 38.9/km^{2} (101/sq mi)
- Demonym: Vicusiens
- Time zone: UTC+01:00 (CET)
  - Summer (DST): UTC+02:00 (CEST)
- INSEE/Postal code: 95690 /95420
- ^{1} French Land Register data, which excludes lakes, ponds, glaciers > 1 km^{2} (0.386 sq mi or 247 acres) and river estuaries.

Wy-dit-Joli-Village (French pronunciation: [wi di ʒɔli vilaʒ]) is a rural commune in the Val-d'Oise department in the Île-de-France region in France. It is part of the Parc naturel régional du Vexin français.

== Name ==
The name Wy comes from the Latin vicus – meaning "village" or cluster of houses (as opposed to a villa, an isolated farm and master's residence).

The full name Wy-dit-Joli-Village ("Wy-called-Pretty-Village") is said to have arisen from an incident in which King Henry IV of France, hunting in the area and enquiring what the settlement was called, exclaimed Ah! Quel joli village! : "Oh, what a pretty village!"

== Geography ==
=== Climate ===
Wy-dit-Joli-Village has an oceanic climate (Köppen climate classification Cfb). The average annual temperature in Wy-dit-Joli-Village is 10.8 °C (51.4 °F). The average annual rainfall is 693.0 mm (27.28 in) with October as the wettest month. The temperatures are highest on average in August, at around 18.6 °C (65.5 °F), and lowest in December, at around 3.9 °C (39.0 °F). The highest temperature ever recorded in Wy-dit-Joli-Village was 41.4 °C (106.5 °F) on 25 July 2019; the coldest temperature ever recorded was −15.8 °C (3.6 °F) on 7 January 2009.

Climate data for Wy-dit-Joli-Village (1981−2010 normals, extremes 1988−2022)
Month	Jan	Feb	Mar	Apr	May	Jun	Jul	Aug	Sep	Oct	Nov	Dec	Year
Record high °C (°F)	15.5 (59.9)	19.6 (67.3)	25.2 (77.4)	27.2 (81.0)	33.3 (91.9)	35.8 (96.4)	41.4 (106.5)	39.8 (103.6)	33.8 (92.8)	28.2 (82.8)	19.3 (66.7)	16.5 (61.7)	41.4 (106.5)
Mean daily maximum °C (°F)	6.6 (43.9)	8.0 (46.4)	11.7 (53.1)	14.8 (58.6)	18.7 (65.7)	21.8 (71.2)	24.5 (76.1)	24.9 (76.8)	20.5 (68.9)	15.8 (60.4)	10.0 (50.0)	6.4 (43.5)	15.3 (59.5)
Daily mean °C (°F)	4.0 (39.2)	4.7 (40.5)	7.4 (45.3)	9.6 (49.3)	13.2 (55.8)	16.0 (60.8)	18.4 (65.1)	18.6 (65.5)	15.0 (59.0)	11.6 (52.9)	6.9 (44.4)	3.9 (39.0)	10.8 (51.4)
Mean daily minimum °C (°F)	1.4 (34.5)	1.5 (34.7)	3.0 (37.4)	4.3 (39.7)	7.7 (45.9)	10.3 (50.5)	12.3 (54.1)	12.3 (54.1)	9.5 (49.1)	7.4 (45.3)	3.8 (38.8)	1.4 (34.5)	6.3 (43.3)
Record low °C (°F)	−15.8 (3.6)	−14.4 (6.1)	−9.3 (15.3)	−6.5 (20.3)	−1.7 (28.9)	−0.5 (31.1)	4.1 (39.4)	3.4 (38.1)	0.0 (32.0)	−4.1 (24.6)	−9.5 (14.9)	−11.3 (11.7)	−15.8 (3.6)
Average precipitation mm (inches)	55.8 (2.20)	49.3 (1.94)	52.7 (2.07)	54.8 (2.16)	58.8 (2.31)	58.0 (2.28)	60.1 (2.37)	52.4 (2.06)	49.8 (1.96)	69.4 (2.73)	62.7 (2.47)	69.2 (2.72)	693.0 (27.28)
Average precipitation days (≥ 1.0 mm)	10.3	9.7	10.0	9.2	9.5	9.0	9.1	8.3	8.2	10.8	11.8	11.9	117.7
Source: Météo-France

== Population ==
Historical population
Year	Pop.	±% p.a.
1968	206	—
1975	158	−3.72%
1982	233	+5.71%
1990	262	+1.48%
1999	307	+1.78%
2007	335	+1.10%
2012	316	−1.16%
2017	333	+1.05%
2023	326	−0.35%
Source: INSEE

== See also ==
- Communes of the Val-d'Oise department
