= Arrondissement of Pontoise =

Coordinates: 49°03′03″N 2°05′47″E

Pontoise
- Arrondissement
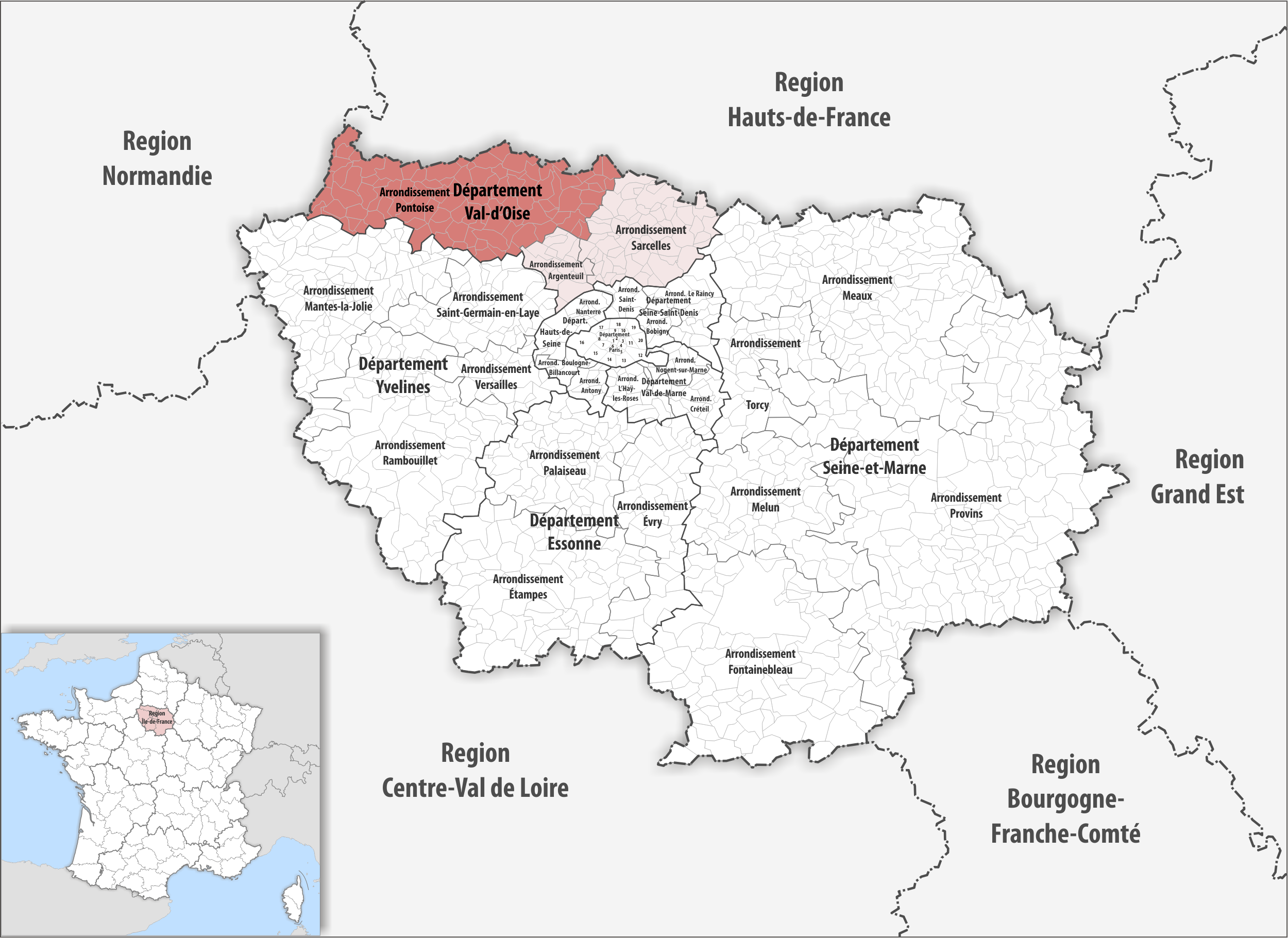
- Location within the region Île-de-France
- Country: France
- Region: Île-de-France
- Department: Val-d'Oise
- No. of communes: {{{nbcomm}}}
- Area: 766.0 km^{2} (295.8 sq mi)
- Population (2023): 357,864
  - Density: 467.2/km^{2} (1,210/sq mi)
- INSEE code: 953

The arrondissement of Pontoise is an arrondissement of France in the Val-d'Oise department in the Île-de-France region. It has 104 communes. Its population is 349,407 (2021), and its area is 766.0 km^{2} (295.8 sq mi).

== Composition ==
The communes of the arrondissement of Pontoise, and their INSEE codes, are:

1. Ableiges (95002)
2. Aincourt (95008)
3. Ambleville (95011)
4. Amenucourt (95012)
5. Arronville (95023)
6. Arthies (95024)
7. Auvers-sur-Oise (95039)
8. Avernes (95040)
9. Banthelu (95046)
10. Beaumont-sur-Oise (95052)
11. Le Bellay-en-Vexin (95054)
12. Bernes-sur-Oise (95058)
13. Berville (95059)
14. Béthemont-la-Forêt (95061)
15. Boisemont (95074)
16. Boissy-l'Aillerie (95078)
17. Bray-et-Lû (95101)
18. Bréançon (95102)
19. Brignancourt (95110)
20. Bruyères-sur-Oise (95116)
21. Buhy (95119)
22. Butry-sur-Oise (95120)
23. Cergy (95127)
24. Champagne-sur-Oise (95134)
25. La Chapelle-en-Vexin (95139)
26. Charmont (95141)
27. Chars (95142)
28. Chaussy (95150)
29. Chauvry (95151)
30. Chérence (95157)
31. Cléry-en-Vexin (95166)
32. Commeny (95169)
33. Condécourt (95170)
34. Cormeilles-en-Vexin (95177)
35. Courcelles-sur-Viosne (95181)
36. Courdimanche (95183)
37. Ennery (95211)
38. Épiais-Rhus (95213)
39. Éragny-sur-Oise (95218)
40. Frémainville (95253)
41. Frémécourt (95254)
42. Frouville (95258)
43. Genainville (95270)
44. Génicourt (95271)
45. Grisy-les-Plâtres (95287)
46. Guiry-en-Vexin (95295)
47. Haravilliers (95298)
48. Haute-Isle (95301)
49. Le Heaulme (95303)
50. Hédouville (95304)
51. Hérouville-en-Vexin (95308)
52. Hodent (95309)
53. L'Isle-Adam (95313)
54. Jouy-le-Moutier (95323)
55. Labbeville (95328)
56. Livilliers (95341)
57. Longuesse (95348)
58. Magny-en-Vexin (95355)
59. Marines (95370)
60. Maudétour-en-Vexin (95379)
61. Menouville (95387)
62. Menucourt (95388)
63. Mériel (95392)
64. Méry-sur-Oise (95394)
65. Montgeroult (95422)
66. Montreuil-sur-Epte (95429)
67. Mours (95436)
68. Moussy (95438)
69. Nerville-la-Forêt (95445)
70. Nesles-la-Vallée (95446)
71. Neuilly-en-Vexin (95447)
72. Neuville-sur-Oise (95450)
73. Nointel (95452)
74. Noisy-sur-Oise (95456)
75. Nucourt (95459)
76. Omerville (95462)
77. Osny (95476)
78. Parmain (95480)
79. Le Perchay (95483)
80. Persan (95487)
81. Pontoise (95500)
82. Presles (95504)
83. Puiseux-Pontoise (95510)
84. La Roche-Guyon (95523)
85. Ronquerolles (95529)
86. Sagy (95535)
87. Saint-Clair-sur-Epte (95541)
88. Saint-Cyr-en-Arthies (95543)
89. Saint-Gervais (95554)
90. Saint-Ouen-l'Aumône (95572)
91. Santeuil (95584)
92. Seraincourt (95592)
93. Théméricourt (95610)
94. Theuville (95611)
95. Us (95625)
96. Vallangoujard (95627)
97. Valmondois (95628)
98. Vauréal (95637)
99. Vétheuil (95651)
100. Vienne-en-Arthies (95656)
101. Vigny (95658)
102. Villers-en-Arthies (95676)
103. Villiers-Adam (95678)
104. Wy-dit-Joli-Village (95690)

== History ==
The arrondissement of Pontoise was created in 1800 as part of the department Seine-et-Oise. In 1968 it became part of the new department Val-d'Oise. At the January 2017 reorganisation of the arrondissements of Val-d'Oise, it received one commune from the arrondissement of Sarcelles, and it lost 10 communes to the arrondissement of Argenteuil and two communes to the arrondissement of Sarcelles.

As a result of the reorganisation of the cantons of France which came into effect in 2015, the borders of the cantons are no longer related to the borders of the arrondissements. The cantons of the arrondissement of Pontoise were, as of January 2015:

1. Beauchamp
2. Beaumont-sur-Oise
3. Cergy-Nord
4. Cergy-Sud
5. Eaubonne
6. Ermont
7. Franconville
8. L'Hautil
9. L'Isle-Adam
10. Magny-en-Vexin
11. Marines
12. Pontoise
13. Saint-Leu-la-Forêt
14. Saint-Ouen-l'Aumône
15. Taverny
16. La Vallée-du-Sausseron
17. Vigny
