= Condécourt =

- Commune
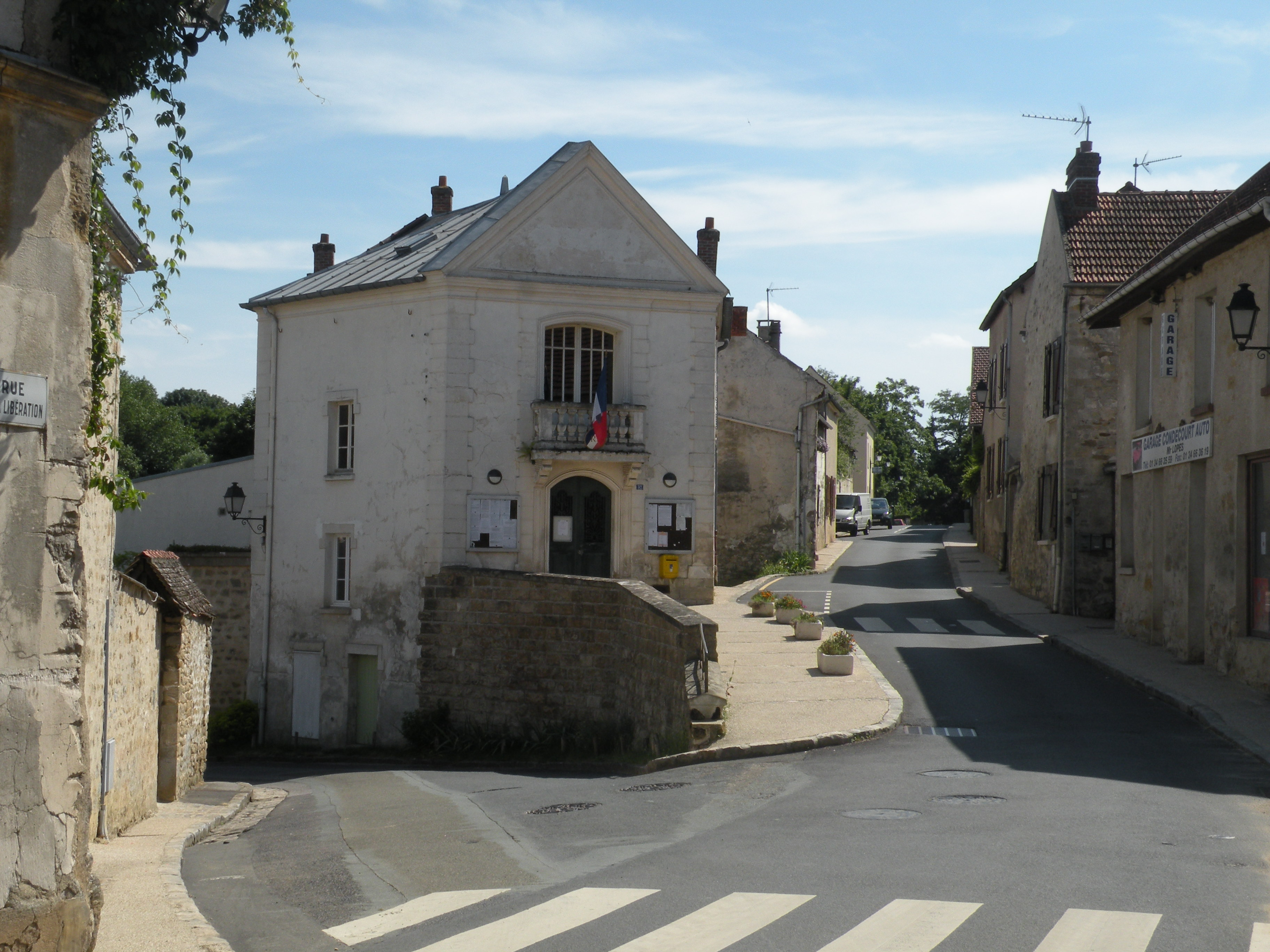
- The town hall of Condécourt
- Location of Condécourt
- Location within France Location within Île-de-France (region)
- Coordinates: 49°02′36″N 1°56′34″E
- Country: France
- Region: Île-de-France
- Department: Val-d'Oise
- Arrondissement: Pontoise
- Canton: Vauréal

Government
  - Mayor (2020–2026): Michel Finet
- Area^{1}: 6.94 km^{2} (2.68 sq mi)
- Highest elevation: 127 m (417 ft)
- Lowest elevation: 37 m (121 ft)
- Population (2023): 564
  - Density: 81.3/km^{2} (210/sq mi)
- Time zone: UTC+01:00 (CET)
  - Summer (DST): UTC+02:00 (CEST)
- INSEE/Postal code: 95170 /95450
- ^{1} French Land Register data, which excludes lakes, ponds, glaciers > 1 km^{2} (0.386 sq mi or 247 acres) and river estuaries.

Condécourt (French pronunciation: [kɔ̃dekuʁ]) is a commune in the Val-d'Oise department in Île-de-France in northern France.

== Geography ==
=== Climate ===
Condécourt has an oceanic climate (Köppen climate classification Cfb). The average annual temperature in Condécourt is 11.1 °C (52.0 °F). The average annual rainfall is 681.0 mm (26.81 in) with December as the wettest month. The temperatures are highest on average in August, at around 19.0 °C (66.2 °F), and lowest in December, at around 4.1 °C (39.4 °F). The highest temperature ever recorded in Condécourt was 40.4 °C (104.7 °F) on 6 August 2003; the coldest temperature ever recorded was −16.8 °C (1.8 °F) on 7 January 2009.

Climate data for Condécourt (1981−2010 normals, extremes 1990−2011)
Month	Jan	Feb	Mar	Apr	May	Jun	Jul	Aug	Sep	Oct	Nov	Dec	Year
Record high °C (°F)	16.4 (61.5)	18.9 (66.0)	23.2 (73.8)	27.8 (82.0)	32.6 (90.7)	35.4 (95.7)	37.0 (98.6)	40.4 (104.7)	33.6 (92.5)	25.9 (78.6)	19.7 (67.5)	17.4 (63.3)	40.4 (104.7)
Mean daily maximum °C (°F)	7.1 (44.8)	8.4 (47.1)	12.3 (54.1)	15.8 (60.4)	19.8 (67.6)	23.1 (73.6)	25.4 (77.7)	25.5 (77.9)	21.4 (70.5)	16.3 (61.3)	10.7 (51.3)	6.9 (44.4)	16.1 (61.0)
Daily mean °C (°F)	4.2 (39.6)	4.7 (40.5)	7.5 (45.5)	10.0 (50.0)	13.8 (56.8)	16.8 (62.2)	18.9 (66.0)	19.0 (66.2)	15.4 (59.7)	11.6 (52.9)	7.2 (45.0)	4.1 (39.4)	11.1 (52.0)
Mean daily minimum °C (°F)	1.2 (34.2)	1.1 (34.0)	2.7 (36.9)	4.2 (39.6)	7.8 (46.0)	10.4 (50.7)	12.5 (54.5)	12.4 (54.3)	9.3 (48.7)	7.0 (44.6)	3.8 (38.8)	1.3 (34.3)	6.2 (43.2)
Record low °C (°F)	−16.8 (1.8)	−13.0 (8.6)	−10.8 (12.6)	−4.4 (24.1)	−1.6 (29.1)	−0.5 (31.1)	4.1 (39.4)	3.0 (37.4)	−0.5 (31.1)	−6.9 (19.6)	−11.2 (11.8)	−11.4 (11.5)	−16.8 (1.8)
Average precipitation mm (inches)	57.3 (2.26)	50.2 (1.98)	50.6 (1.99)	49.6 (1.95)	58.4 (2.30)	51.0 (2.01)	60.8 (2.39)	54.2 (2.13)	49.7 (1.96)	66.3 (2.61)	61.3 (2.41)	71.6 (2.82)	681.0 (26.81)
Average precipitation days (≥ 1.0 mm)	10.3	10.0	10.0	9.5	10.2	8.9	8.7	8.0	8.5	10.2	11.5	12.1	117.5
Source: Météo-France

== See also ==
- Communes of the Val-d'Oise department
