= Charmont, Val-d'Oise =

Charmont
- Commune
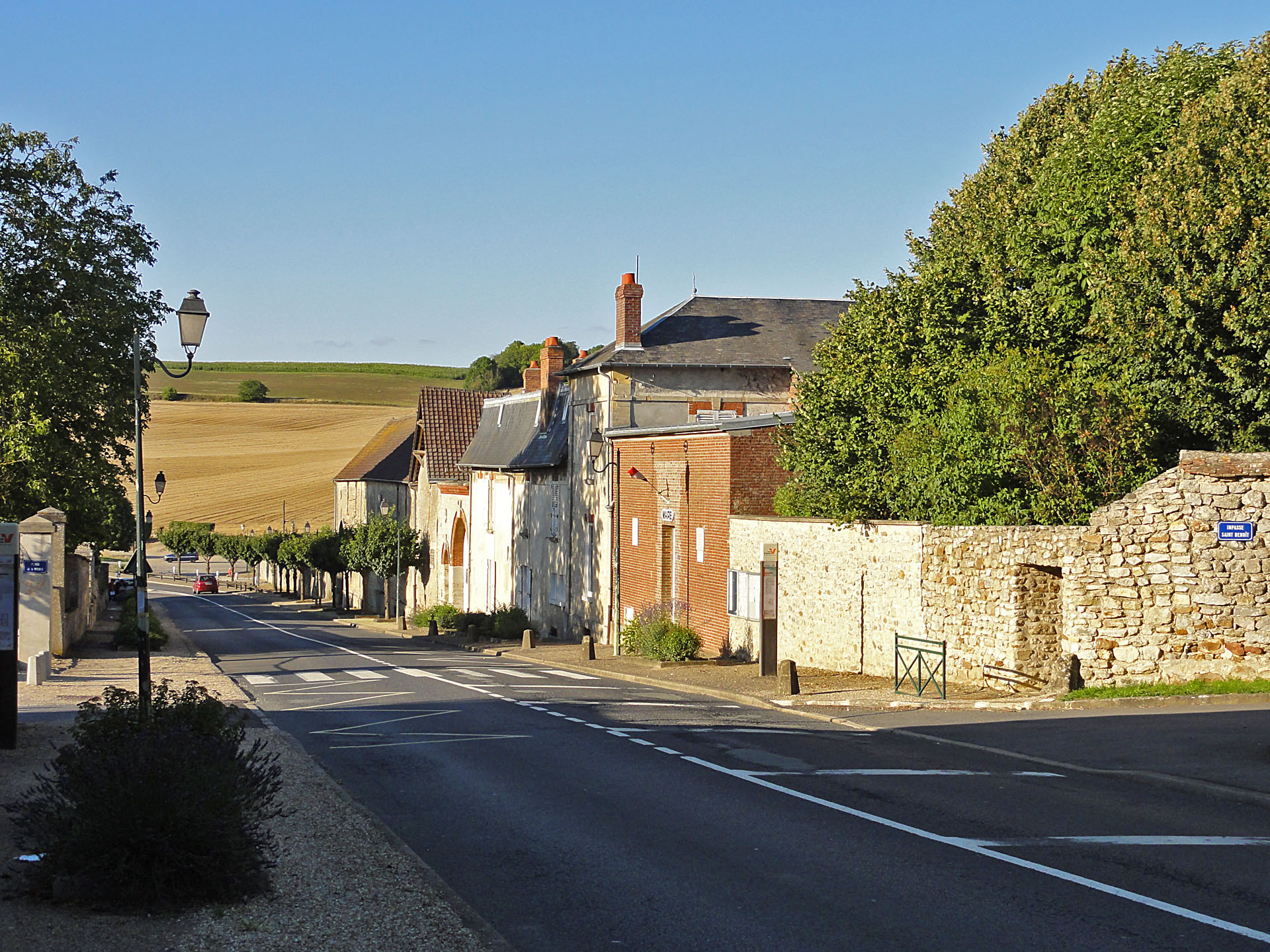
- The main road through the village, and the town hall in the centre
- Location of Charmont
- Location within France Location within Île-de-France (region)
- Coordinates: 49°08′12″N 1°47′31″E
- Country: France
- Region: Île-de-France
- Department: Val-d'Oise
- Arrondissement: Pontoise
- Canton: Vauréal

Government
  - Mayor (2020–2026): Rodolphe Thomassin
- Area^{1}: 3.83 km^{2} (1.48 sq mi)
- Highest elevation: 153 m (502 ft)
- Lowest elevation: 78 m (256 ft)
- Population (2023): 32
  - Density: 8.4/km^{2} (22/sq mi)
- Time zone: UTC+01:00 (CET)
  - Summer (DST): UTC+02:00 (CEST)
- INSEE/Postal code: 95141 /95420
- ^{1} French Land Register data, which excludes lakes, ponds, glaciers > 1 km^{2} (0.386 sq mi or 247 acres) and river estuaries.

Charmont (French pronunciation: [ʃaʁmɔ̃]) is a commune in the Val-d'Oise department and Île-de-France region of France. It is located in the regional nature park of Vexin.

With just 30 inhabitants in 2015, Charmont is the least populated commune in the department and region.

== Geography ==
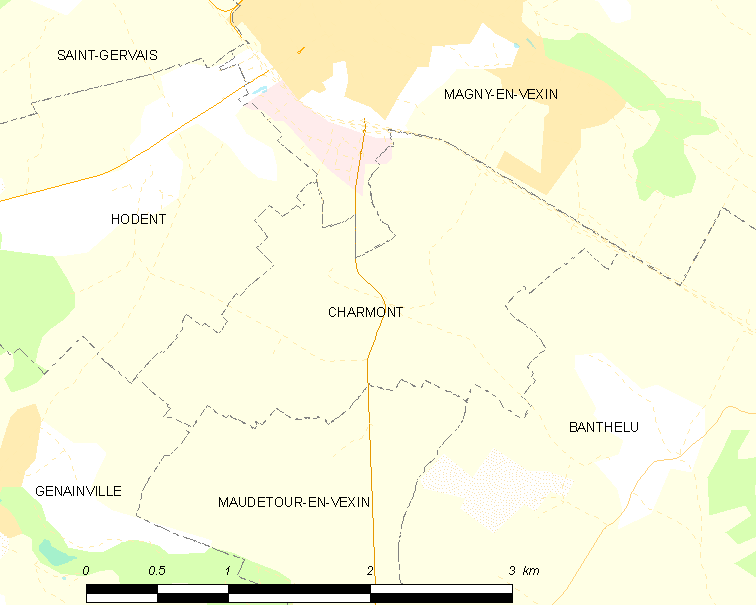
A map of the commune

The commune is located approximately 52 km from the center of Paris.

== See also ==
- Communes of the Val-d'Oise department
