= Buhy =

- Commune
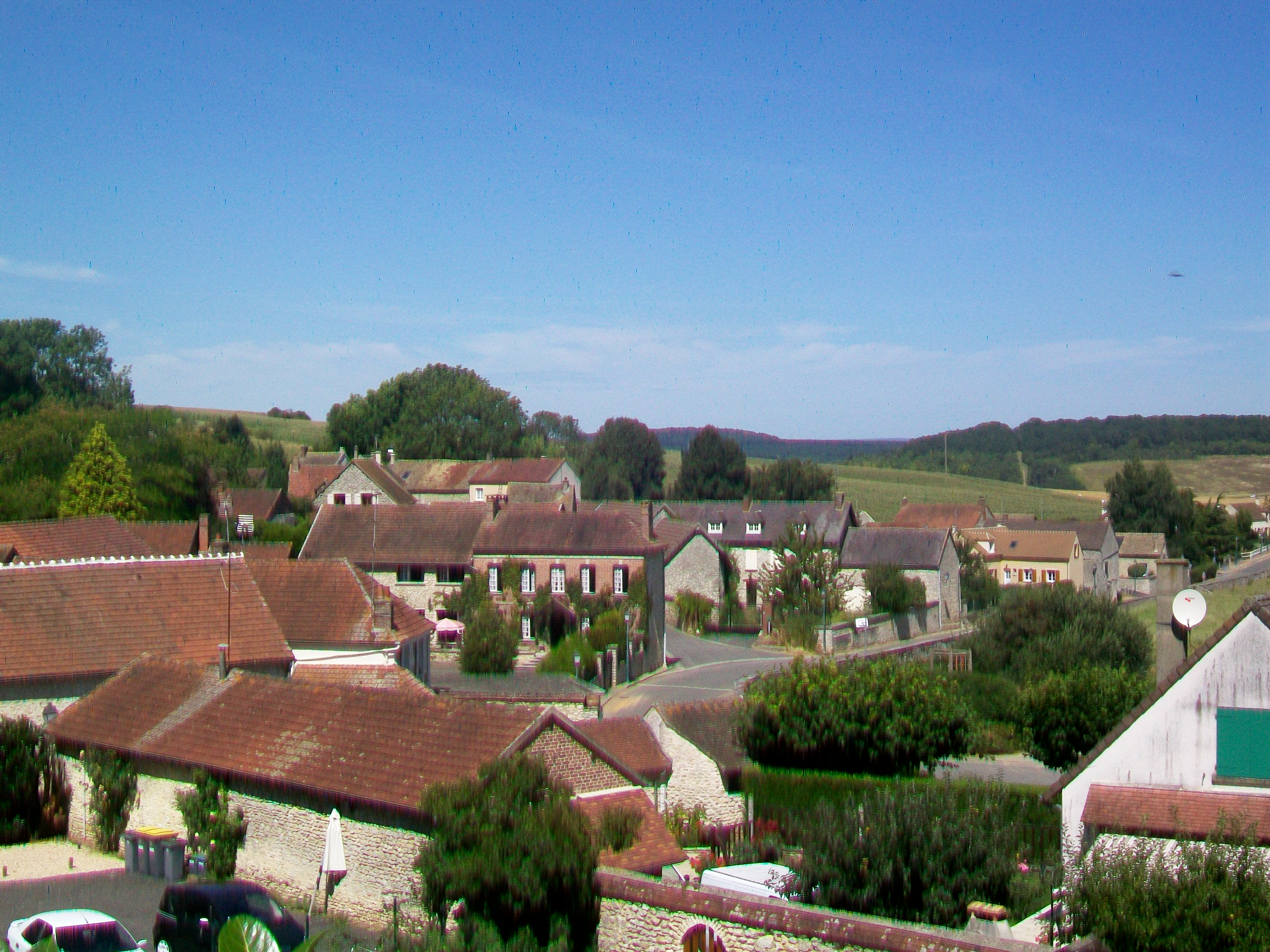
- A view from the west of the village, from the Rue du Trésor

- Coat of arms
- Location of Buhy
- Location within France Location within Île-de-France (region)
- Coordinates: 49°11′38″N 1°41′31″E
- Country: France
- Region: Île-de-France
- Department: Val-d'Oise
- Arrondissement: Pontoise
- Canton: Vauréal

Government
  - Mayor (2020–2026): Jean-Pierre Doré
- Area^{1}: 6.86 km^{2} (2.65 sq mi)
- Highest elevation: 151 m (495 ft)
- Lowest elevation: 43 m (141 ft)
- Population (2023): 329
  - Density: 48.0/km^{2} (124/sq mi)
- Time zone: UTC+01:00 (CET)
  - Summer (DST): UTC+02:00 (CEST)
- INSEE/Postal code: 95119 /95770
- ^{1} French Land Register data, which excludes lakes, ponds, glaciers > 1 km^{2} (0.386 sq mi or 247 acres) and river estuaries.

Buhy (French pronunciation: [by.i]) is a commune in the Val-d'Oise department in Île-de-France in northern France.

== Geography ==
=== Climate ===
Buhy has an oceanic climate (Köppen climate classification Cfb). The average annual temperature in Buhy is 11.1 °C (52.0 °F). The average annual rainfall is 727.8 mm (28.65 in) with December as the wettest month. The temperatures are highest on average in August, at around 18.8 °C (65.8 °F), and lowest in January, at around 4.1 °C (39.4 °F). The highest temperature ever recorded in Buhy was 39.5 °C (103.1 °F) on 11 August 2003; the coldest temperature ever recorded was −14.0 °C (6.8 °F) on 12 January 1987.

Climate data for Buhy (1981−2010 normals, extremes 1986−2015)
Month	Jan	Feb	Mar	Apr	May	Jun	Jul	Aug	Sep	Oct	Nov	Dec	Year
Record high °C (°F)	15.7 (60.3)	18.8 (65.8)	23.4 (74.1)	28.6 (83.5)	31.3 (88.3)	38.1 (100.6)	39.0 (102.2)	39.5 (103.1)	33.7 (92.7)	28.7 (83.7)	23.0 (73.4)	16.7 (62.1)	39.5 (103.1)
Mean daily maximum °C (°F)	6.6 (43.9)	7.9 (46.2)	11.6 (52.9)	14.9 (58.8)	19.0 (66.2)	21.9 (71.4)	24.3 (75.7)	24.5 (76.1)	20.6 (69.1)	15.9 (60.6)	10.2 (50.4)	6.8 (44.2)	15.4 (59.7)
Daily mean °C (°F)	4.1 (39.4)	4.7 (40.5)	7.5 (45.5)	9.9 (49.8)	13.7 (56.7)	16.5 (61.7)	18.7 (65.7)	18.8 (65.8)	15.5 (59.9)	11.9 (53.4)	7.2 (45.0)	4.4 (39.9)	11.1 (52.0)
Mean daily minimum °C (°F)	1.6 (34.9)	1.5 (34.7)	3.4 (38.1)	4.8 (40.6)	8.3 (46.9)	11.0 (51.8)	13.0 (55.4)	13.0 (55.4)	10.3 (50.5)	8.0 (46.4)	4.3 (39.7)	2.0 (35.6)	6.8 (44.2)
Record low °C (°F)	−14.0 (6.8)	−13.8 (7.2)	−9.3 (15.3)	−4.2 (24.4)	−0.3 (31.5)	−0.6 (30.9)	4.0 (39.2)	4.0 (39.2)	0.3 (32.5)	−5.4 (22.3)	−9.4 (15.1)	−11.1 (12.0)	−14.0 (6.8)
Average precipitation mm (inches)	62.8 (2.47)	53.3 (2.10)	57.9 (2.28)	57.2 (2.25)	58.9 (2.32)	59.4 (2.34)	61.7 (2.43)	51.1 (2.01)	55.6 (2.19)	68.1 (2.68)	62.6 (2.46)	79.2 (3.12)	727.8 (28.65)
Average precipitation days (≥ 1.0 mm)	11.1	9.8	10.3	9.9	9.7	9.1	8.6	8.0	8.0	10.8	11.7	12.4	119.3
Source: Météo-France

== See also ==
- Communes of the Val-d'Oise department
