= Longuesse =

- Commune
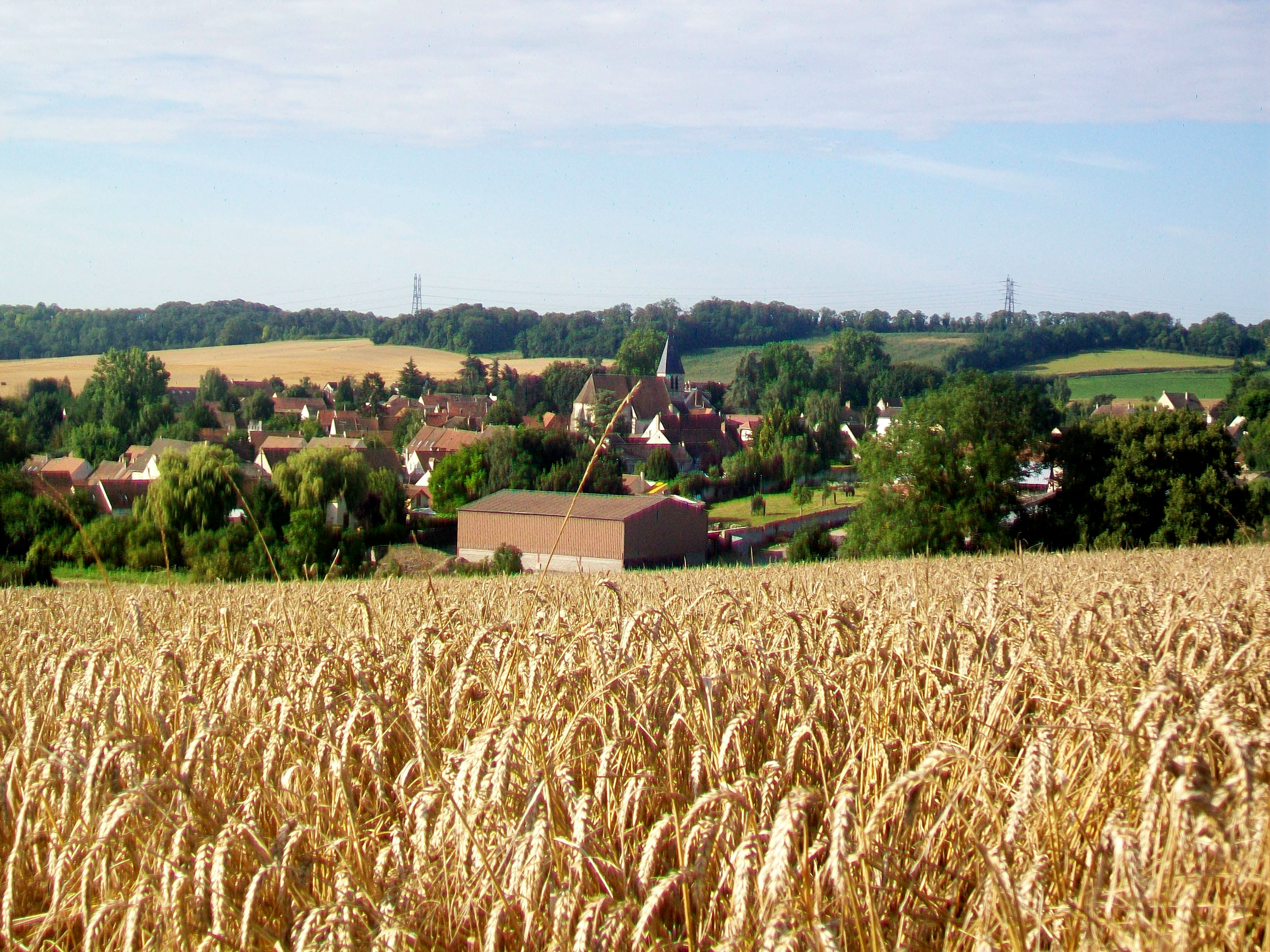
- A view of the village of Longuesse

- Coat of arms
- Location of Longuesse
- Location within France Location within Île-de-France (region)
- Coordinates: 49°03′46″N 1°55′59″E
- Country: France
- Region: Île-de-France
- Department: Val-d'Oise
- Arrondissement: Pontoise
- Canton: Vauréal

Government
  - Mayor (2020–2026): Norbert Lalloyer
- Area^{1}: 8.50 km^{2} (3.28 sq mi)
- Highest elevation: 132 m (433 ft)
- Lowest elevation: 45 m (148 ft)
- Population (2023): 496
  - Density: 58.4/km^{2} (151/sq mi)
- Time zone: UTC+01:00 (CET)
  - Summer (DST): UTC+02:00 (CEST)
- INSEE/Postal code: 95348 /95450
- ^{1} French Land Register data, which excludes lakes, ponds, glaciers > 1 km^{2} (0.386 sq mi or 247 acres) and river estuaries.

Longuesse (French pronunciation: [lɔ̃ɡɛs]) is a commune in the Val-d'Oise department in Île-de-France in northern France.

== See also ==
- Communes of the Val-d'Oise department
