= Omerville =

- Commune
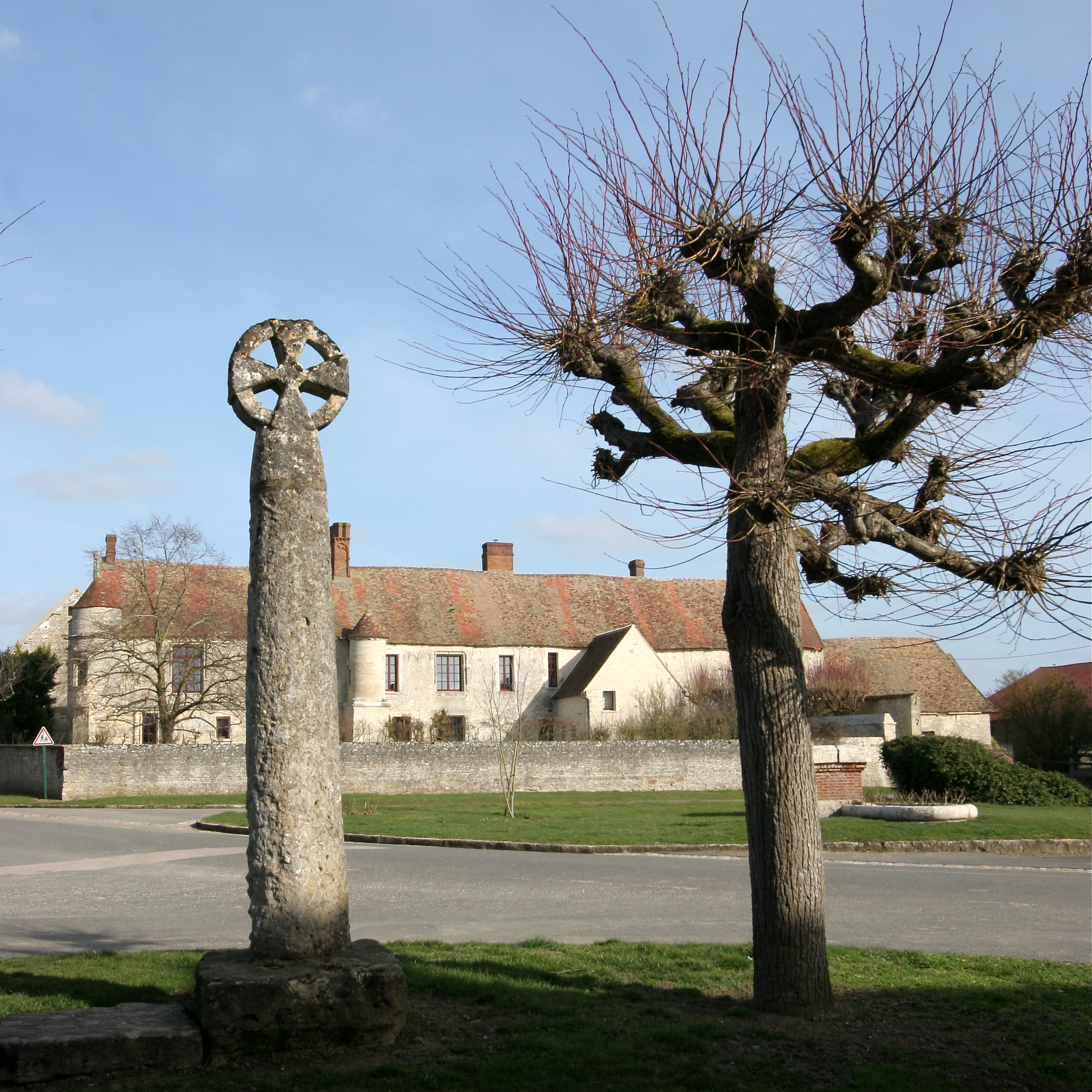
- The cross and the manor, in Omerville

- Coat of arms
- Location of Omerville
- Location within France Location within Île-de-France (region)
- Coordinates: 49°08′29″N 1°43′11″E
- Country: France
- Region: Île-de-France
- Department: Val-d'Oise
- Arrondissement: Pontoise
- Canton: Vauréal

Government
  - Mayor (2020–2026): Denys de Magnitot
- Area^{1}: 11.98 km^{2} (4.63 sq mi)
- Highest elevation: 157 m (515 ft)
- Lowest elevation: 42 m (138 ft)
- Population (2023): 327
  - Density: 27.3/km^{2} (70.7/sq mi)
- Time zone: UTC+01:00 (CET)
  - Summer (DST): UTC+02:00 (CEST)
- INSEE/Postal code: 95462 /95420
- ^{1} French Land Register data, which excludes lakes, ponds, glaciers > 1 km^{2} (0.386 sq mi or 247 acres) and river estuaries.

Omerville (French pronunciation: [ɔmɛʁvil]) is a commune in the Val-d'Oise department and Île-de-France region of France. It is located in the regional nature park of Vexin.

== Geography ==
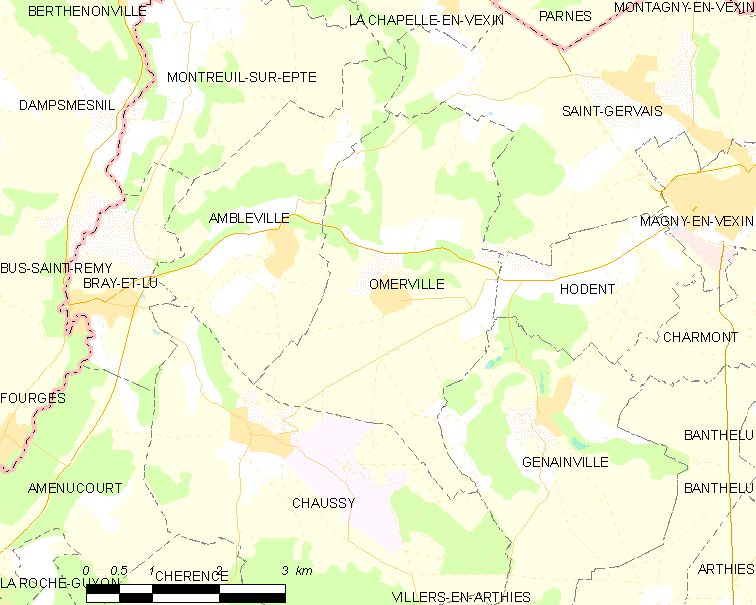
A map of the commune

The commune is located approximately 56 km from Paris.

== See also ==
- Communes of the Val-d'Oise department
