= Bray-et-Lû =

- Commune
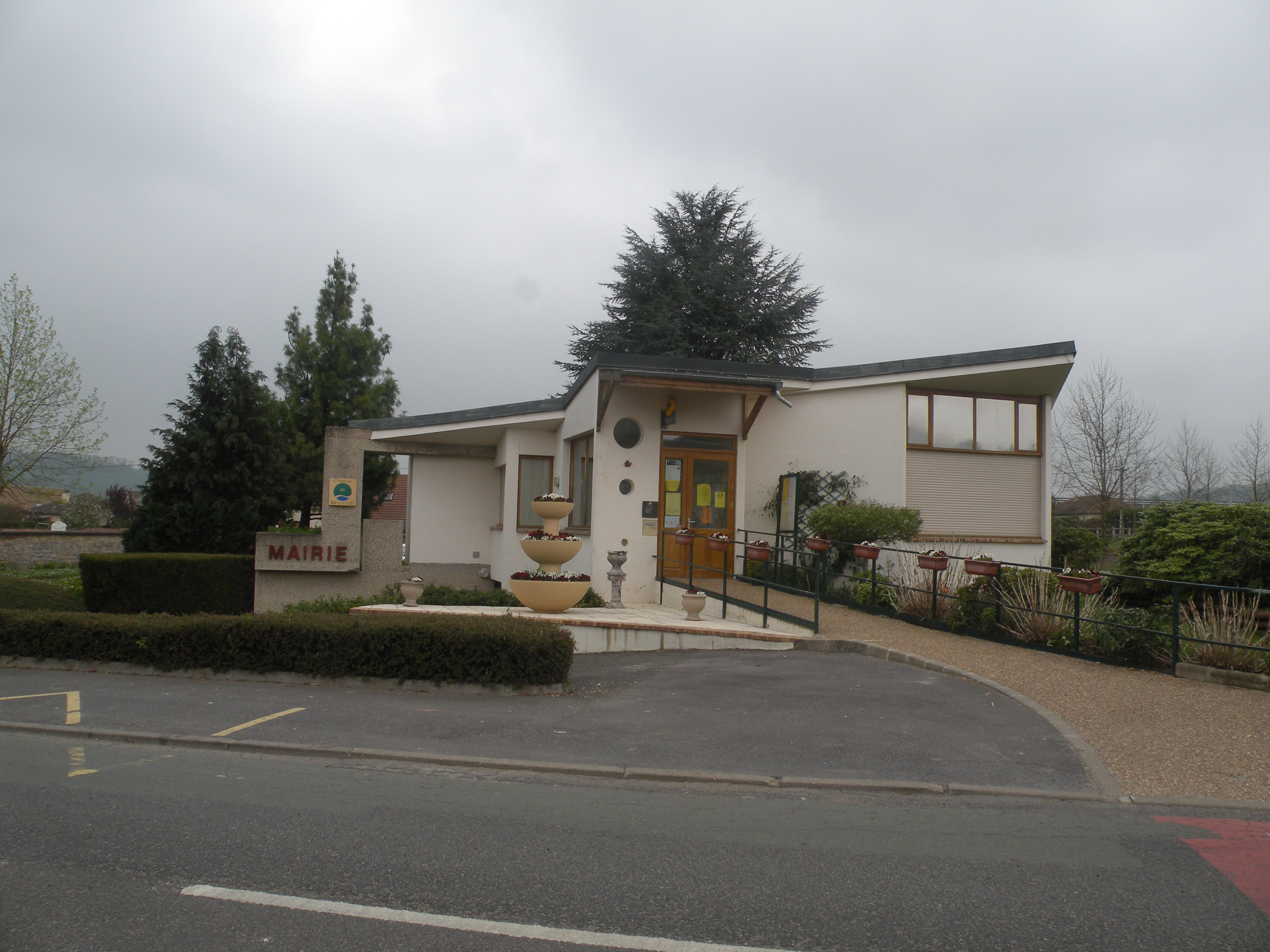
- The town hall of Bray-et-Lû

- Coat of arms
- Location of Bray-et-Lû
- Location within France Location within Île-de-France (region)
- Coordinates: 49°08′25″N 1°39′37″E
- Country: France
- Region: Île-de-France
- Department: Val-d'Oise
- Arrondissement: Pontoise
- Canton: Vauréal

Government
  - Mayor (2020–2026): Corine Beaufils
- Area^{1}: 3.71 km^{2} (1.43 sq mi)
- Highest elevation: 127 m (417 ft)
- Lowest elevation: 24 m (79 ft)
- Population (2023): 954
  - Density: 257/km^{2} (666/sq mi)
- Time zone: UTC+01:00 (CET)
  - Summer (DST): UTC+02:00 (CEST)
- INSEE/Postal code: 95101 /95710
- ^{1} French Land Register data, which excludes lakes, ponds, glaciers > 1 km^{2} (0.386 sq mi or 247 acres) and river estuaries.

Bray-et-Lû (French pronunciation: [bʁɛ e ly]) is a commune in the Val-d'Oise department in Île-de-France in northern France.

== See also ==
- Communes of the Val-d'Oise department
