= Frémainville =

- Commune
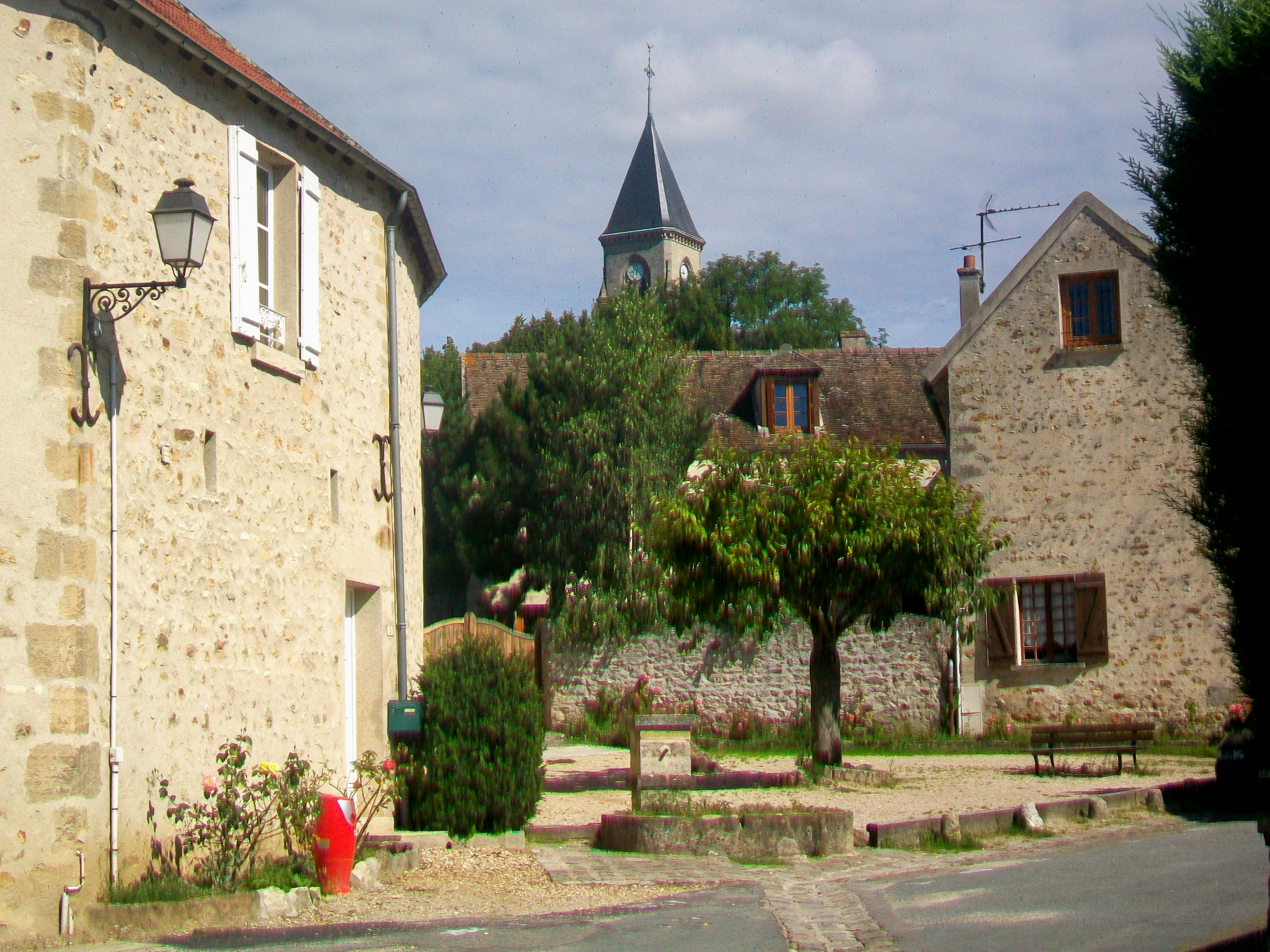
- The fountain in Frémainville, with the church in the background
- Location of Frémainville
- Location within France Location within Île-de-France (region)
- Coordinates: 49°03′59″N 1°52′03″E
- Country: France
- Region: Île-de-France
- Department: Val-d'Oise
- Arrondissement: Pontoise
- Canton: Vauréal

Government
  - Mayor (2020–2026): Marcel Elisée Allegre
- Area^{1}: 5.61 km^{2} (2.17 sq mi)
- Highest elevation: 197 m (646 ft)
- Lowest elevation: 79 m (259 ft)
- Population (2023): 507
  - Density: 90.4/km^{2} (234/sq mi)
- Time zone: UTC+01:00 (CET)
  - Summer (DST): UTC+02:00 (CEST)
- INSEE/Postal code: 95253 /95450
- ^{1} French Land Register data, which excludes lakes, ponds, glaciers > 1 km^{2} (0.386 sq mi or 247 acres) and river estuaries.

Frémainville (French pronunciation: [fʁemɛ̃vil]) is a commune in the Val-d'Oise department in Île-de-France in northern France.

== See also ==
- Communes of the Val-d'Oise department
