= Hodent =

- Commune
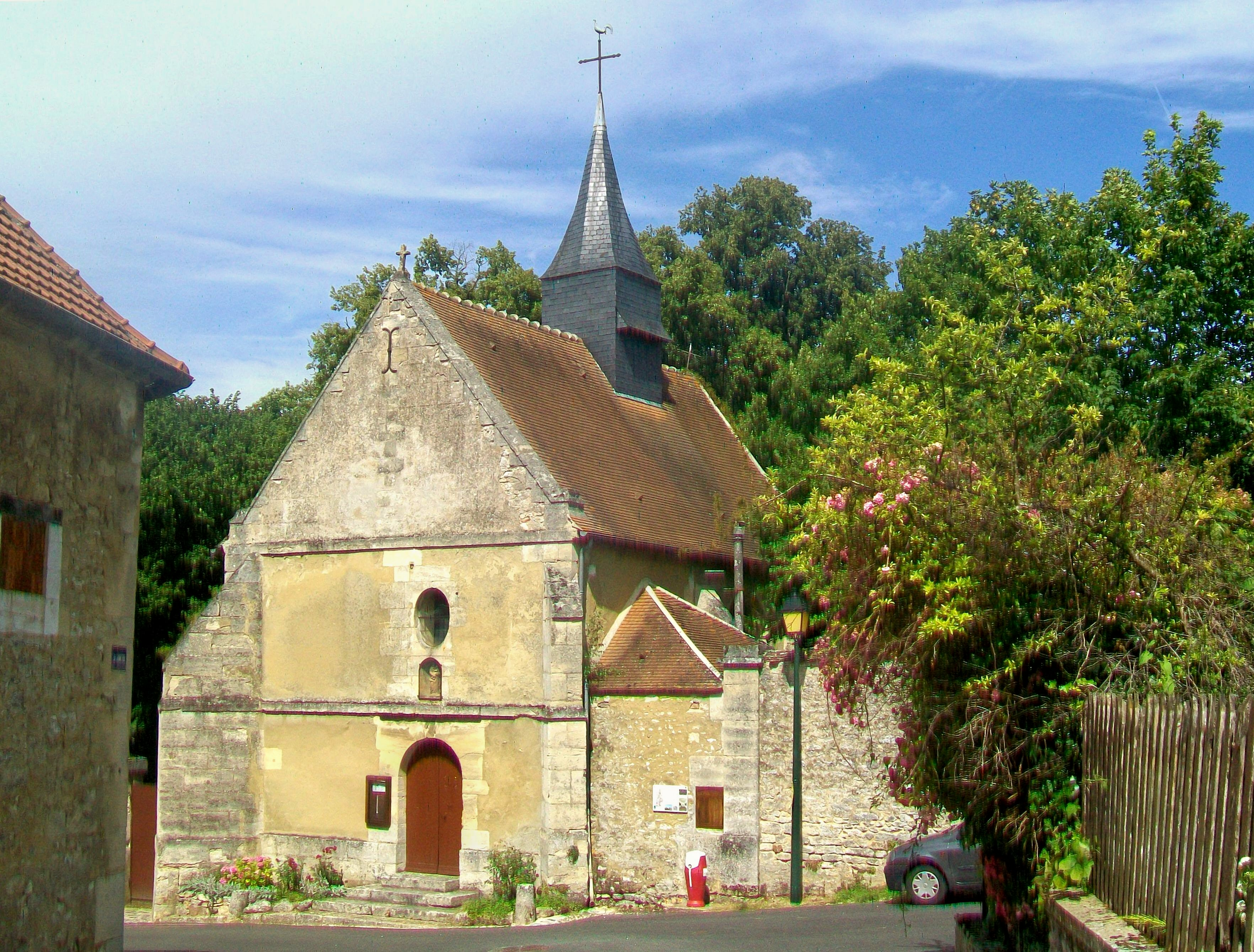
- The chapel of Sainte-Marguerite, in Hodent

- Coat of arms
- Location of Hodent
- Location within France Location within Île-de-France (region)
- Coordinates: 49°08′41″N 1°46′05″E
- Country: France
- Region: Île-de-France
- Department: Val-d'Oise
- Arrondissement: Pontoise
- Canton: Vauréal

Government
  - Mayor (2020–2026): Éric Breton
- Area^{1}: 4.37 km^{2} (1.69 sq mi)
- Highest elevation: 140 m (460 ft)
- Lowest elevation: 49 m (161 ft)
- Population (2023): 225
  - Density: 51.5/km^{2} (133/sq mi)
- Time zone: UTC+01:00 (CET)
  - Summer (DST): UTC+02:00 (CEST)
- INSEE/Postal code: 95309 /95420
- ^{1} French Land Register data, which excludes lakes, ponds, glaciers > 1 km^{2} (0.386 sq mi or 247 acres) and river estuaries.

Hodent (French pronunciation: [ɔdɑ̃]) is a commune in the Val-d'Oise department and Île-de-France region of France. It is located in the regional nature park of Vexin.

== Geography ==
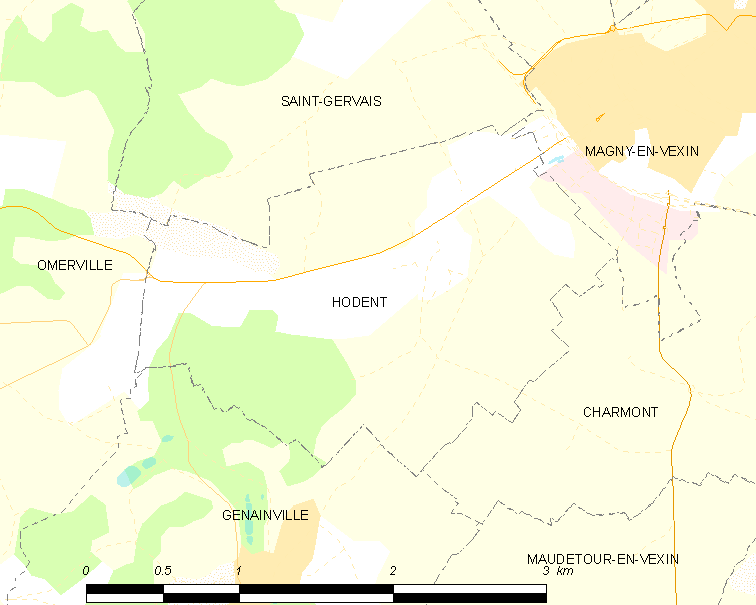
A map of the commune

Hodent is located approximately 53 km from Paris.

== Notable people ==
- Louis Alexandre de La Rochefoucauld d'Enville

== See also ==
- Communes of the Val-d'Oise department
