= Vienne-en-Arthies =

- Commune
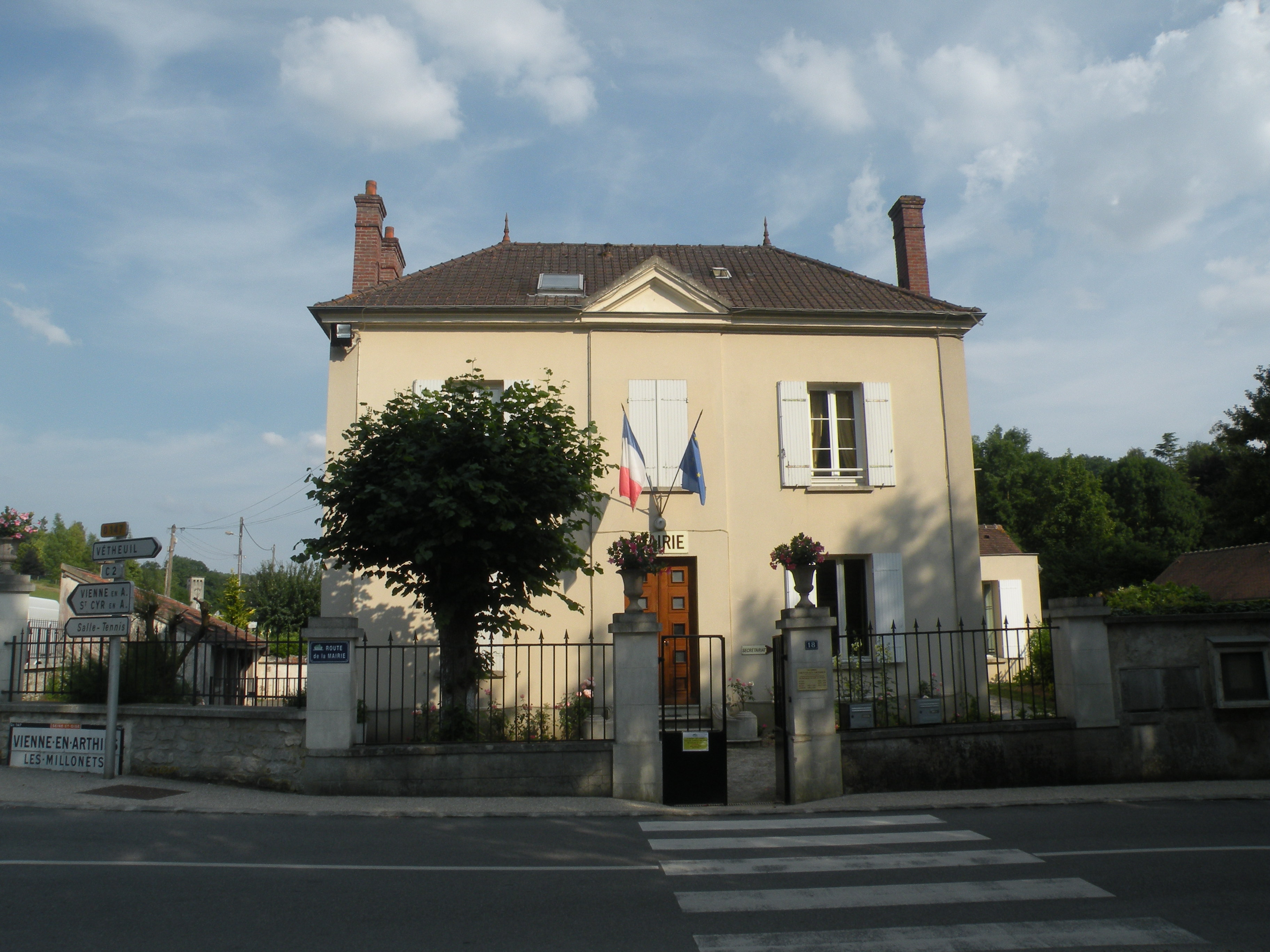
- The town hall of Vienne-en-Arthies
- Location of Vienne-en-Arthies
- Location within France Location within Île-de-France (region)
- Coordinates: 49°04′02″N 1°44′02″E
- Country: France
- Region: Île-de-France
- Department: Val-d'Oise
- Arrondissement: Pontoise
- Canton: Vauréal
- Intercommunality: Vexin Val de Seine

Government
  - Mayor (2020–2026): Serge Billoué
- Area^{1}: 3.76 km^{2} (1.45 sq mi)
- Highest elevation: 147 m (482 ft)
- Lowest elevation: 35 m (115 ft)
- Population (2023): 379
  - Density: 101/km^{2} (261/sq mi)
- Time zone: UTC+01:00 (CET)
  - Summer (DST): UTC+02:00 (CEST)
- INSEE/Postal code: 95656 /95510
- ^{1} French Land Register data, which excludes lakes, ponds, glaciers > 1 km^{2} (0.386 sq mi or 247 acres) and river estuaries.

Vienne-en-Arthies (French pronunciation: [vjɛn ɑ̃.n‿aʁti]) is a commune in the Val-d'Oise department in Île-de-France in northern France.

== See also ==
- Communes of the Val-d'Oise department
