= Genainville =

- Commune
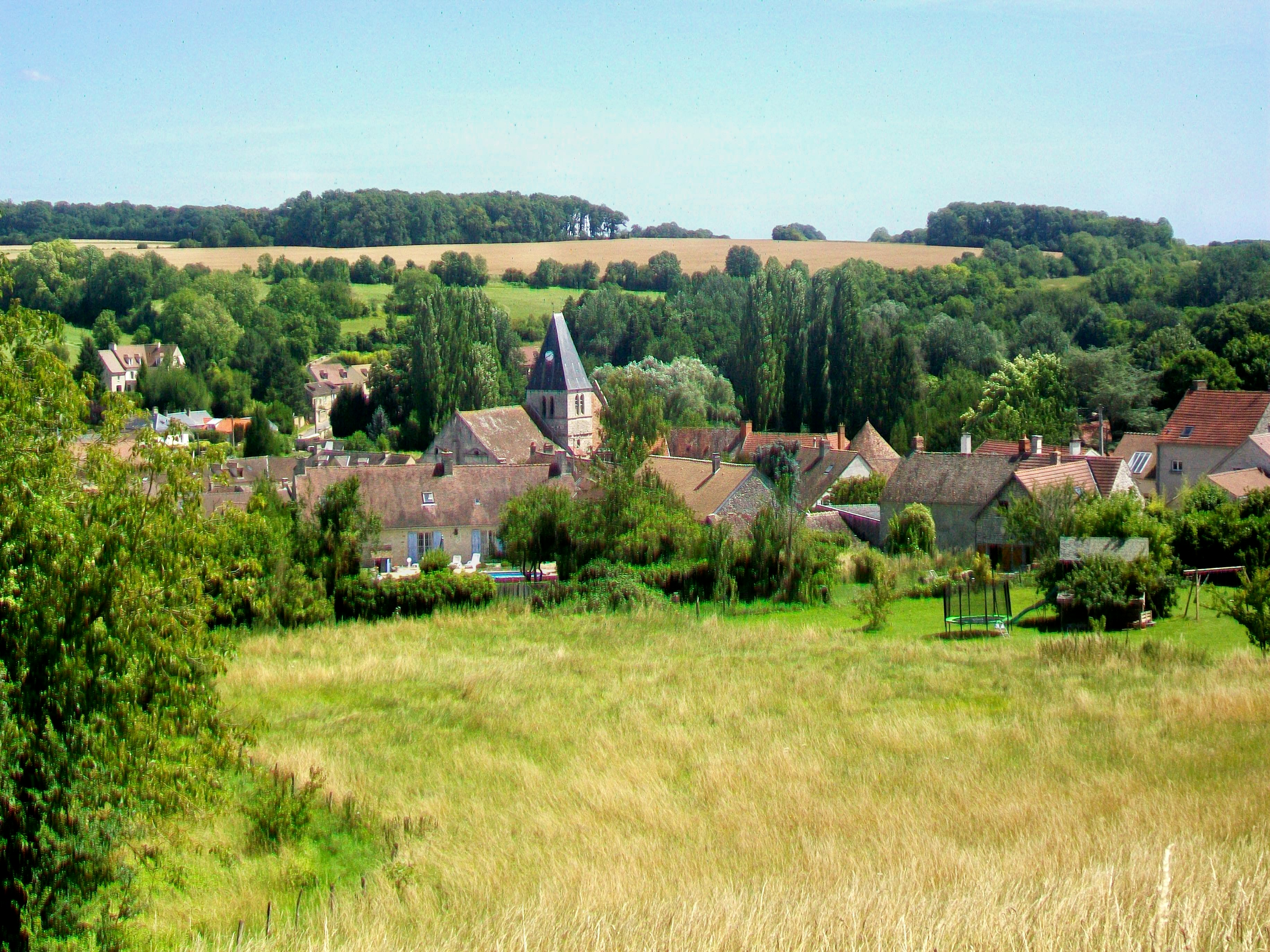
- A general view of the village

- Coat of arms
- Location of Genainville
- Location within France Location within Île-de-France (region)
- Coordinates: 49°07′34″N 1°45′11″E
- Country: France
- Region: Île-de-France
- Department: Val-d'Oise
- Arrondissement: Pontoise
- Canton: Vauréal

Government
  - Mayor (2020–2026): Alain Schmit
- Area^{1}: 10.50 km^{2} (4.05 sq mi)
- Highest elevation: 203 m (666 ft)
- Lowest elevation: 60 m (200 ft)
- Population (2023): 522
  - Density: 49.7/km^{2} (129/sq mi)
- Time zone: UTC+01:00 (CET)
  - Summer (DST): UTC+02:00 (CEST)
- INSEE/Postal code: 95270 /95420
- ^{1} French Land Register data, which excludes lakes, ponds, glaciers > 1 km^{2} (0.386 sq mi or 247 acres) and river estuaries.

Genainville (French pronunciation: [ʒənɛ̃vil]) is a commune in the Val-d'Oise department in Île-de-France in northern France. It is located in the regional nature park of Vexin.

== Geography ==
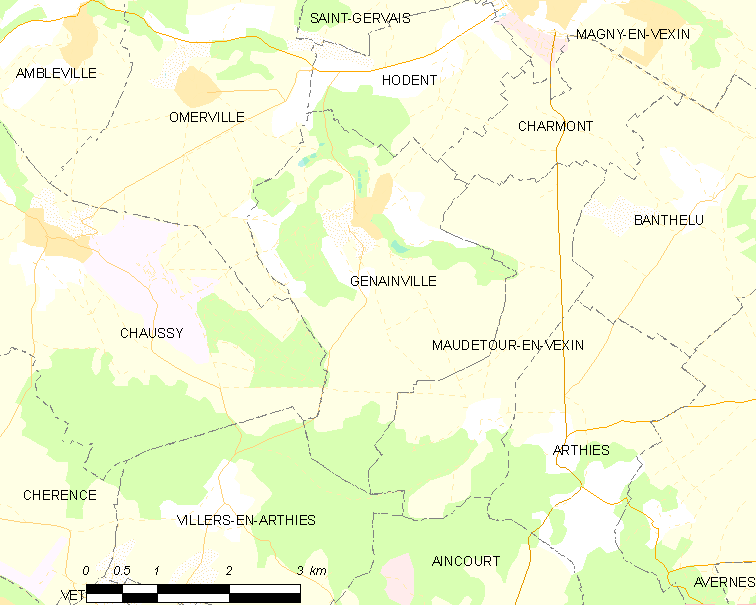
A map of the commune

It is located approximately 52 km from Paris.

== See also ==
- Communes of the Val-d'Oise department
