= Montreuil-sur-Epte =

- Commune
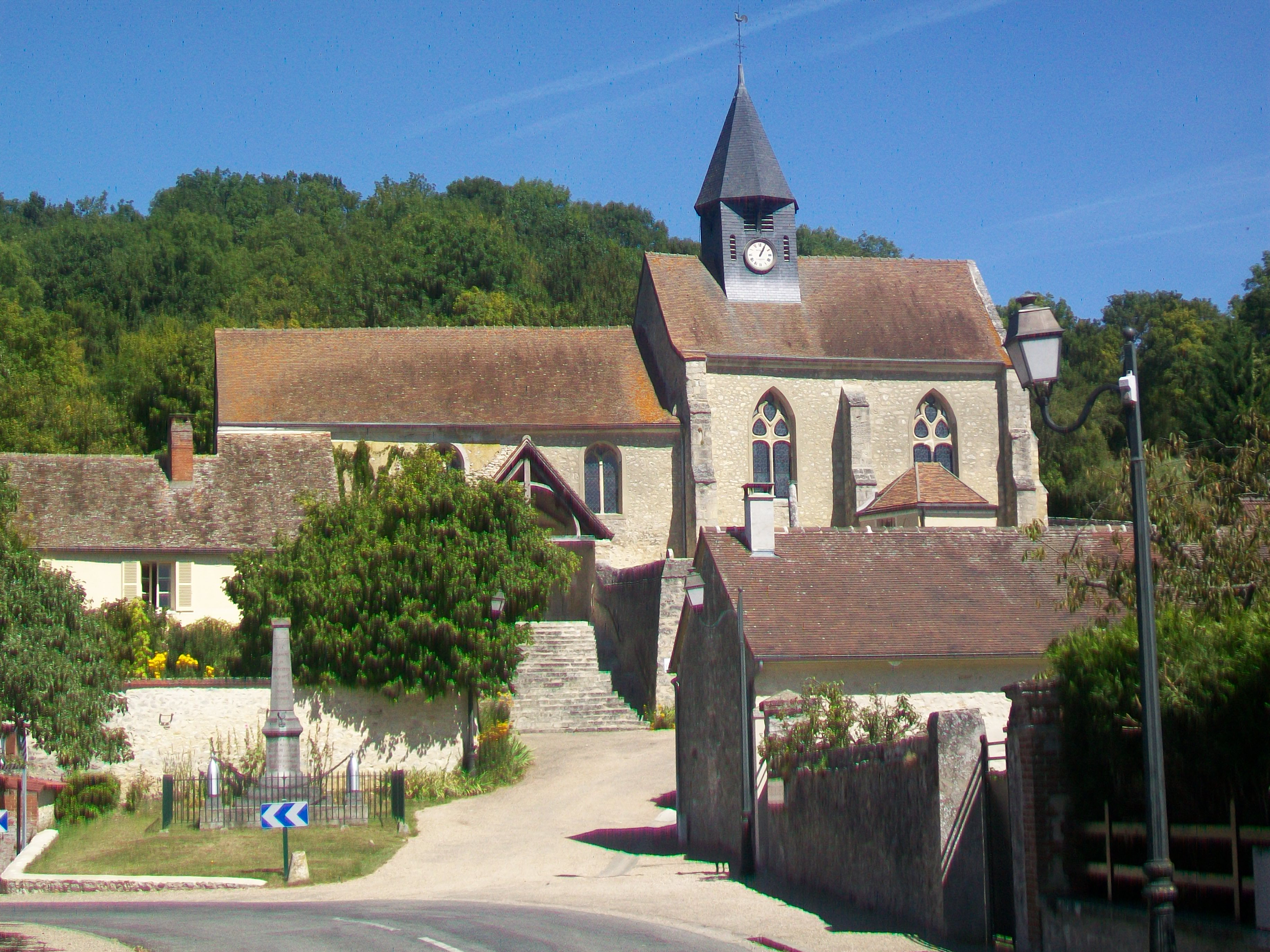
- The church of Saint-Denis, in Montreuil-sur-Epte
- Location of Montreuil-sur-Epte
- Location within France Location within Île-de-France (region)
- Coordinates: 49°10′38″N 1°40′45″E
- Country: France
- Region: Île-de-France
- Department: Val-d'Oise
- Arrondissement: Pontoise
- Canton: Vauréal

Government
  - Mayor (2020–2026): Jean-Pierre Javelot
- Area^{1}: 7.15 km^{2} (2.76 sq mi)
- Highest elevation: 157 m (515 ft)
- Lowest elevation: 27 m (89 ft)
- Population (2023): 377
  - Density: 52.7/km^{2} (137/sq mi)
- Time zone: UTC+01:00 (CET)
  - Summer (DST): UTC+02:00 (CEST)
- INSEE/Postal code: 95429 /95770
- ^{1} French Land Register data, which excludes lakes, ponds, glaciers > 1 km^{2} (0.386 sq mi or 247 acres) and river estuaries.

Montreuil-sur-Epte (French pronunciation: [mɔ̃tʁœj syʁ ɛpt], literally Montreuil on Epte) is a commune in the Val-d'Oise department in Île-de-France in northern France.

== See also ==
- Communes of the Val-d'Oise department
