= Banthelu =

- Commune
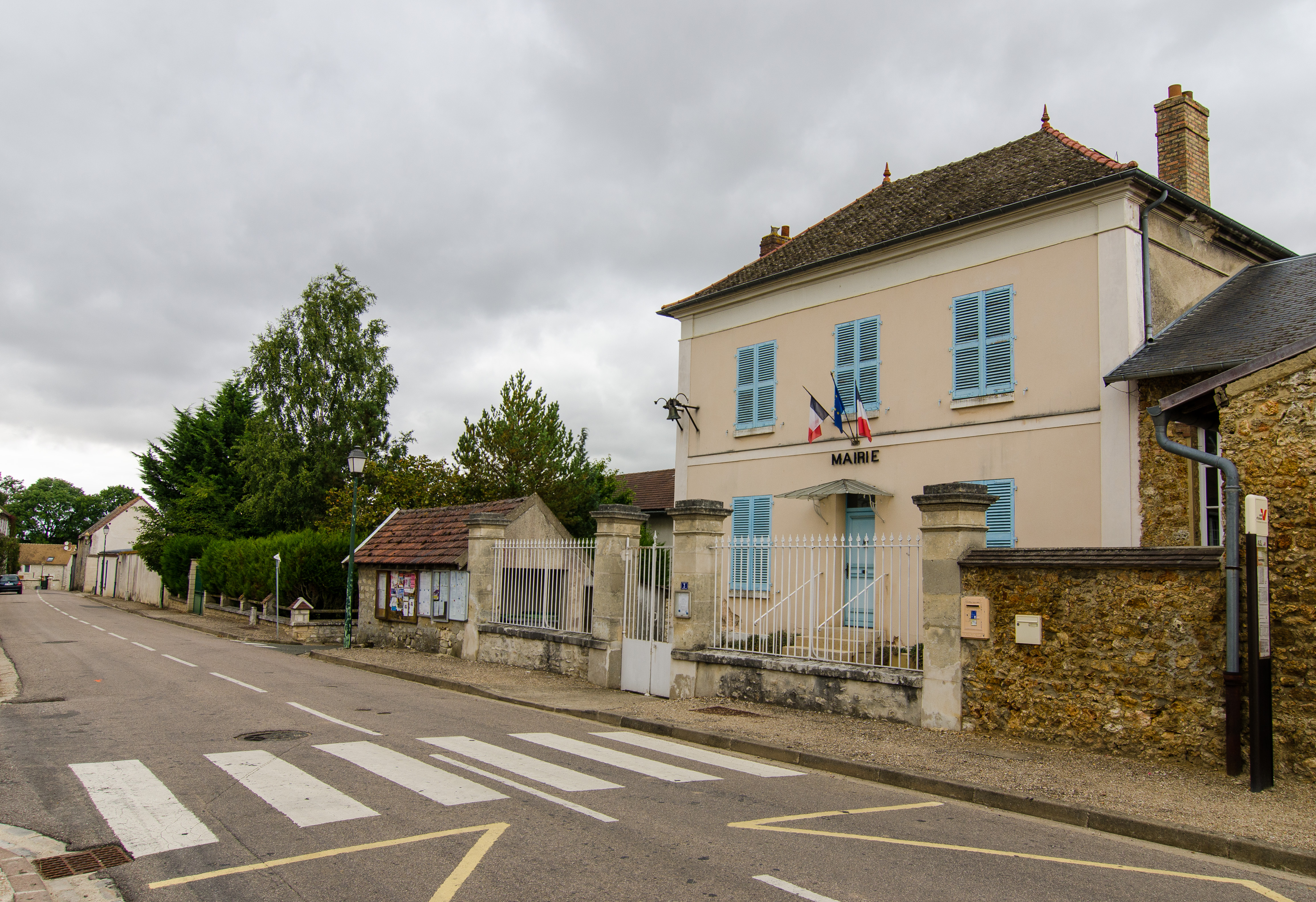
- The town hall of Banthelu

- Coat of arms
- Location of Banthelu
- Location within France Location within Île-de-France (region)
- Coordinates: 49°07′37″N 1°48′56″E
- Country: France
- Region: Île-de-France
- Department: Val-d'Oise
- Arrondissement: Pontoise
- Canton: Vauréal

Government
  - Mayor (2020–2026): Gérard Leharivelle
- Area^{1}: 8.10 km^{2} (3.13 sq mi)
- Highest elevation: 168 m (551 ft)
- Lowest elevation: 117 m (384 ft)
- Population (2023): 146
  - Density: 18.0/km^{2} (46.7/sq mi)
- Time zone: UTC+01:00 (CET)
  - Summer (DST): UTC+02:00 (CEST)
- INSEE/Postal code: 95046 /95420
- ^{1} French Land Register data, which excludes lakes, ponds, glaciers > 1 km^{2} (0.386 sq mi or 247 acres) and river estuaries.

Banthelu (French pronunciation: [bɑ̃tly]) is a commune in the Val-d'Oise department and Île-de-France region of France.It is located in the regional nature park of Vexin.

== See also ==
- Communes of the Val-d'Oise department
