= Canton of Vauréal =

Coordinates: 49.03°N 2.02°E

The canton of Vauréal is an administrative division of the Val-d'Oise department, Île-de-France region, northern France. It was created at the French canton reorganisation which came into effect in March 2015. Its seat is in Vauréal.

It consists of the following communes:

1. Aincourt
2. Ambleville
3. Amenucourt
4. Arthies
5. Avernes
6. Banthelu
7. Bray-et-Lû
8. Buhy
9. La Chapelle-en-Vexin
10. Charmont
11. Chaussy
12. Chérence
13. Cléry-en-Vexin
14. Condécourt
15. Courdimanche
16. Frémainville
17. Genainville
18. Guiry-en-Vexin
19. Haute-Isle
20. Hodent
21. Longuesse
22. Magny-en-Vexin
23. Maudétour-en-Vexin
24. Menucourt
25. Montreuil-sur-Epte
26. Omerville
27. La Roche-Guyon
28. Sagy
29. Saint-Clair-sur-Epte
30. Saint-Cyr-en-Arthies
31. Saint-Gervais
32. Seraincourt
33. Théméricourt
34. Vauréal
35. Vétheuil
36. Vienne-en-Arthies
37. Vigny
38. Villers-en-Arthies
39. Wy-dit-Joli-Village
