= Cléry-en-Vexin =

- Commune
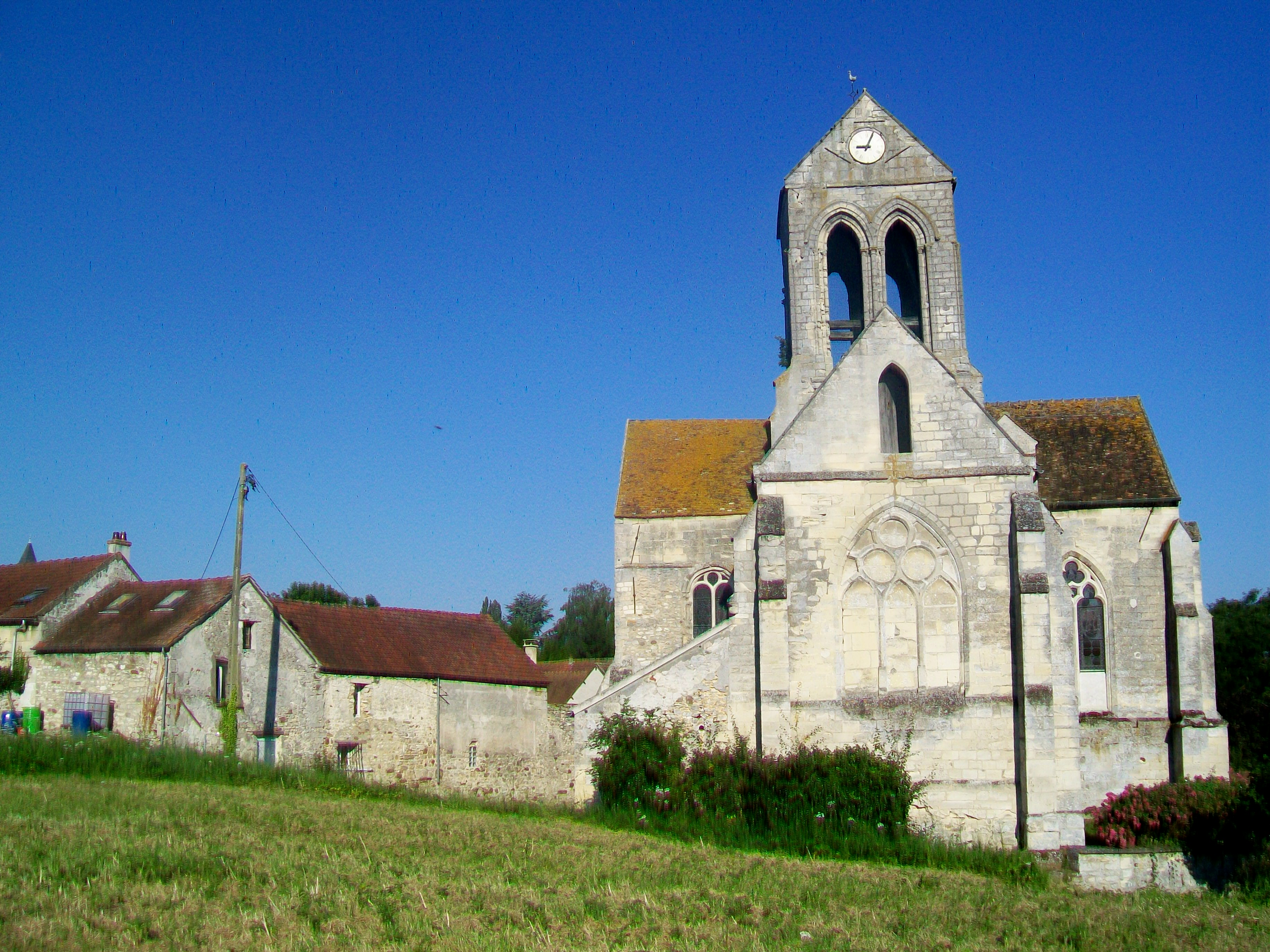
- The church of Saint-Germain-de-Paris, in Cléry-en-Vexin
- Location of Cléry-en-Vexin
- Location within France Location within Île-de-France (region)
- Coordinates: 49°07′40″N 1°50′21″E
- Country: France
- Region: Île-de-France
- Department: Val-d'Oise
- Arrondissement: Pontoise
- Canton: Vauréal

Government
  - Mayor (2020–2026): René Pannier
- Area^{1}: 5.10 km^{2} (1.97 sq mi)
- Highest elevation: 179 m (587 ft)
- Lowest elevation: 115 m (377 ft)
- Population (2023): 476
  - Density: 93.3/km^{2} (242/sq mi)
- Time zone: UTC+01:00 (CET)
  - Summer (DST): UTC+02:00 (CEST)
- INSEE/Postal code: 95166 /95420
- ^{1} French Land Register data, which excludes lakes, ponds, glaciers > 1 km^{2} (0.386 sq mi or 247 acres) and river estuaries.

Cléry-en-Vexin (French pronunciation: [kleʁi ɑ̃ vɛksɛ̃], literally Cléry in Vexin) is a commune in the Val-d'Oise department in Île-de-France in northern France.

== See also ==
- Communes of the Val-d'Oise department
