= Guiry-en-Vexin =

- Commune
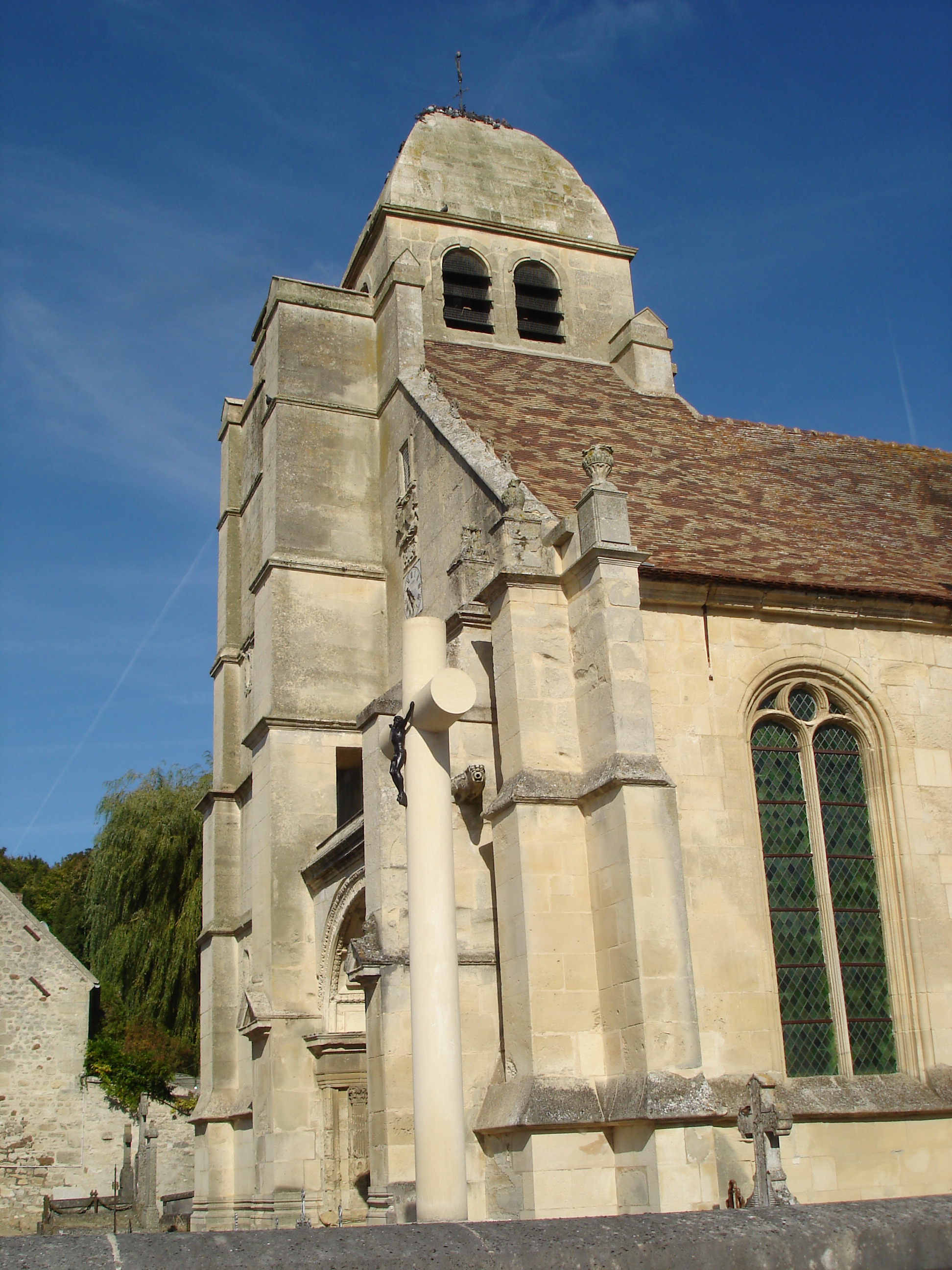
- The church of Saint-Nicolas, in Guiry-en-Vexin

- Coat of arms
- Location of Guiry-en-Vexin
- Location within France Location within Île-de-France (region)
- Coordinates: 49°06′34″N 1°51′02″E
- Country: France
- Region: Île-de-France
- Department: Val-d'Oise
- Arrondissement: Pontoise
- Canton: Vauréal

Government
  - Mayor (2020–2026): Michel Cathala
- Area^{1}: 6.16 km^{2} (2.38 sq mi)
- Highest elevation: 154 m (505 ft)
- Lowest elevation: 89 m (292 ft)
- Population (2023): 161
  - Density: 26.1/km^{2} (67.7/sq mi)
- Time zone: UTC+01:00 (CET)
  - Summer (DST): UTC+02:00 (CEST)
- INSEE/Postal code: 95295 /95450
- ^{1} French Land Register data, which excludes lakes, ponds, glaciers > 1 km^{2} (0.386 sq mi or 247 acres) and river estuaries.

Guiry-en-Vexin (French pronunciation: [ɡiʁi ɑ̃ vɛksɛ̃], literally Guiry in Vexin) is a commune in the Val-d'Oise department in Île-de-France in northern France.

== See also ==
- Communes of the Val-d'Oise department
