= Haute-Isle =

- Commune
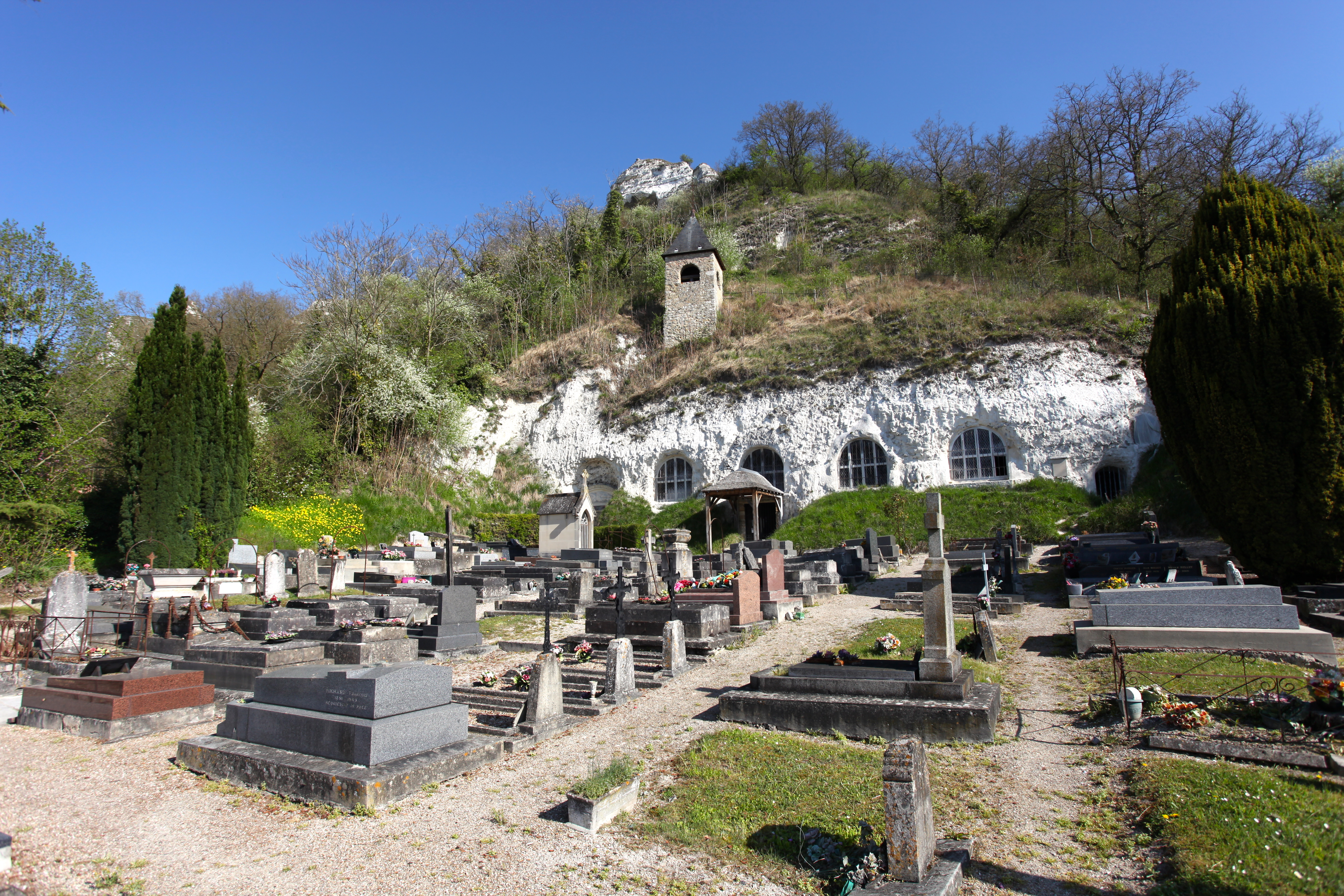
- The cave church of Our Lady of the Annunciation and the cemetery of Haute-Isle

- Coat of arms
- Location of Haute-Isle
- Location within France Location within Île-de-France (region)
- Coordinates: 49°05′04″N 1°39′32″E
- Country: France
- Region: Île-de-France
- Department: Val-d'Oise
- Arrondissement: Pontoise
- Canton: Vauréal
- Intercommunality: Vexin Val de Seine

Government
  - Mayor (2020–2026): Alain Errard
- Area^{1}: 2.57 km^{2} (0.99 sq mi)
- Highest elevation: 148 m (486 ft)
- Lowest elevation: 13 m (43 ft)
- Population (2023): 293
  - Density: 114/km^{2} (295/sq mi)
- Time zone: UTC+01:00 (CET)
  - Summer (DST): UTC+02:00 (CEST)
- INSEE/Postal code: 95301 /95780
- ^{1} French Land Register data, which excludes lakes, ponds, glaciers > 1 km^{2} (0.386 sq mi or 247 acres) and river estuaries.

Haute-Isle (French pronunciation: [ot il]) is a commune in the Val-d'Oise department in Île-de-France in northern France.

== See also ==
- Communes of the Val-d'Oise department
