= Amenucourt =

- Commune
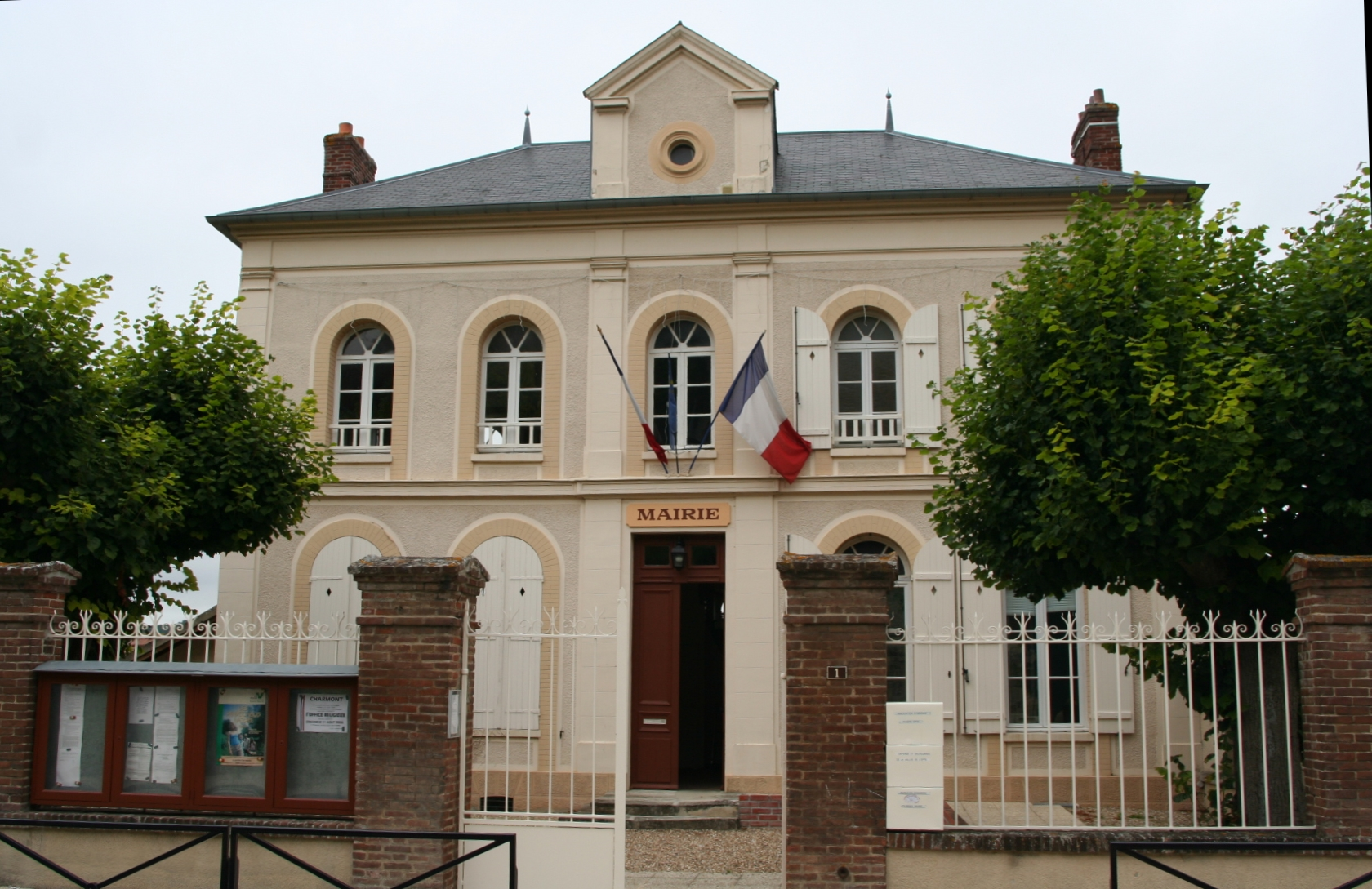
- The town hall of Amenucourt

- Coat of arms
- Location of Amenucourt
- Location within France Location within Île-de-France (region)
- Coordinates: 49°06′23″N 1°38′34″E
- Country: France
- Region: Île-de-France
- Department: Val-d'Oise
- Arrondissement: Pontoise
- Canton: Vauréal
- Intercommunality: Vexin - Val de Seine

Government
  - Mayor (2020–2026): Frédérique Cambourieux
- Area^{1}: 8.70 km^{2} (3.36 sq mi)
- Highest elevation: 153 m (502 ft)
- Lowest elevation: 19 m (62 ft)
- Population (2023): 212
  - Density: 24.4/km^{2} (63.1/sq mi)
- Time zone: UTC+01:00 (CET)
  - Summer (DST): UTC+02:00 (CEST)
- INSEE/Postal code: 95012 /95510
- ^{1} French Land Register data, which excludes lakes, ponds, glaciers > 1 km^{2} (0.386 sq mi or 247 acres) and river estuaries.

Amenucourt (French pronunciation: [am(ə)nykuʁ]) is a commune in the Val-d'Oise department in Île-de-France in northern France.

== Population ==
Historical population

Year	Pop.	±% p.a.
1793	321	—
1821	255	−0.82%
1846	251	−0.06%
1872	227	−0.39%
1901	202	−0.40%
1926	154	−1.08%
1946	116	−1.41%
1962	131	+0.76%
1968	127	−0.52%

Year	Pop.	±% p.a.
1975	128	+0.11%
1982	127	−0.11%
1990	170	+3.71%
1999	173	+0.19%
2007	183	+0.70%
2012	206	+2.40%
2017	210	+0.39%
2023	212	+0.16%

Source: EHESS and INSEE (1968-2023)

== See also ==
- Communes of the Val-d'Oise department
