= Arthies =

- Commune
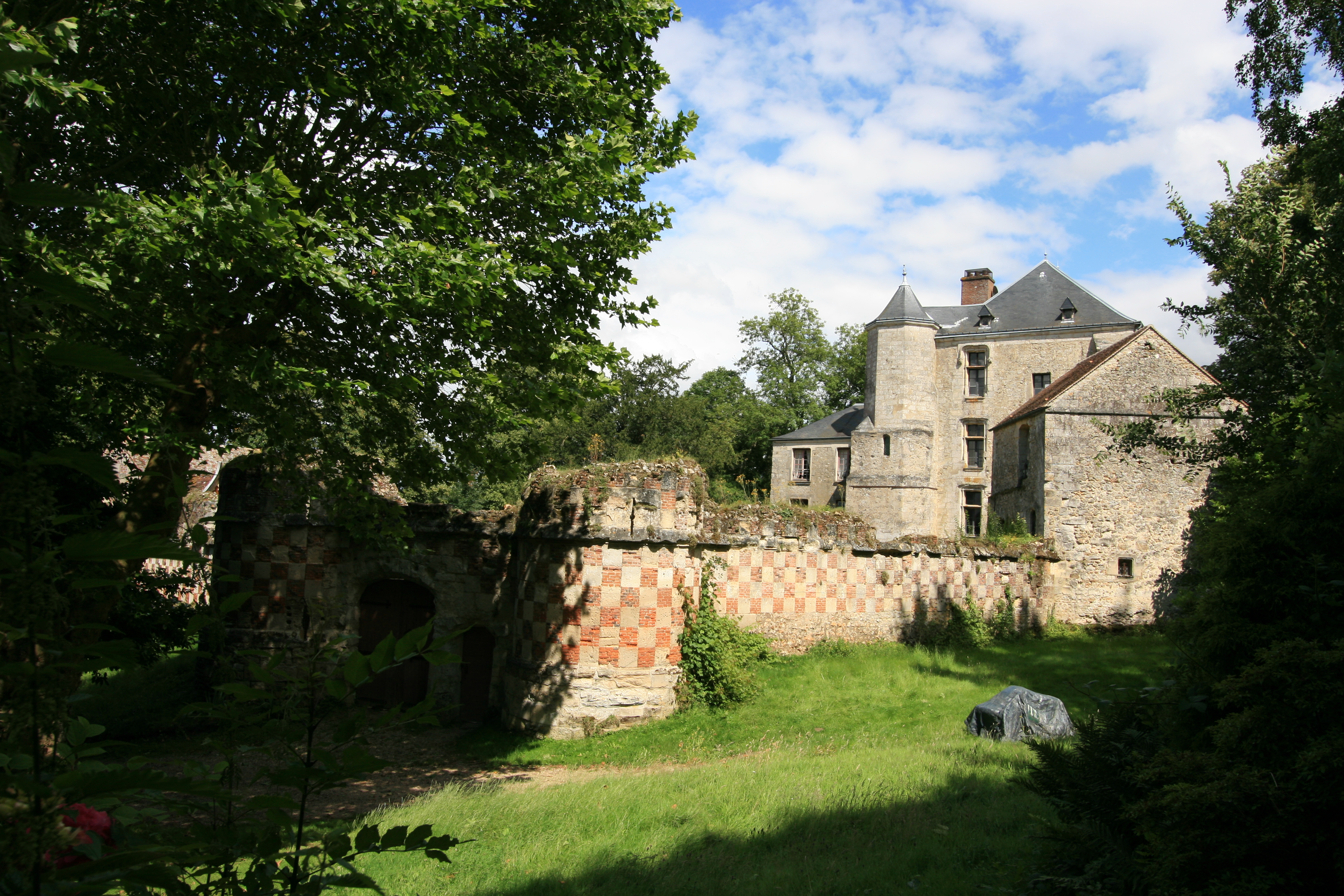
- The château of Arthies and the fortified gate

- Coat of arms
- Location of Arthies
- Location within France Location within Île-de-France (region)
- Coordinates: 49°05′46″N 1°47′29″E
- Country: France
- Region: Île-de-France
- Department: Val-d'Oise
- Arrondissement: Pontoise
- Canton: Vauréal
- Intercommunality: CC Vexin Val Seine

Government
  - Mayor (2020–2026): Jean Beernaert
- Area^{1}: 7.40 km^{2} (2.86 sq mi)
- Highest elevation: 203 m (666 ft)
- Lowest elevation: 123 m (404 ft)
- Population (2023): 265
  - Density: 35.8/km^{2} (92.7/sq mi)
- Time zone: UTC+01:00 (CET)
  - Summer (DST): UTC+02:00 (CEST)
- INSEE/Postal code: 95024 /95420
- ^{1} French Land Register data, which excludes lakes, ponds, glaciers > 1 km^{2} (0.386 sq mi or 247 acres) and river estuaries.

Arthies (French pronunciation: [aʁ.ti]) is a commune in the Val-d'Oise department in Île-de-France in northern France. It is located in the regional nature park of Vexin.

== Geography ==
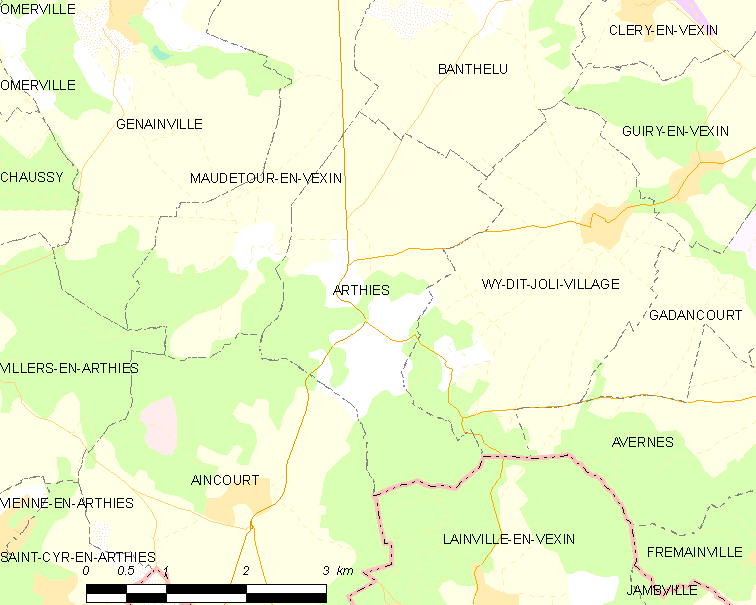
A map of the commune

Arthies is located approximately 50 km from Paris.

== Population ==
Historical population
Year	Pop.	±% p.a.
1968	171	—
1975	190	+1.52%
1982	185	−0.38%
1990	194	+0.60%
1999	258	+3.22%
2007	284	+1.21%
2012	297	+0.90%
2017	278	−1.31%
2023	265	−0.80%
Source: INSEE

== See also ==
- Communes of the Val-d'Oise department
