= Saint-Gervais, Val-d'Oise =

Saint-Gervais
- Commune
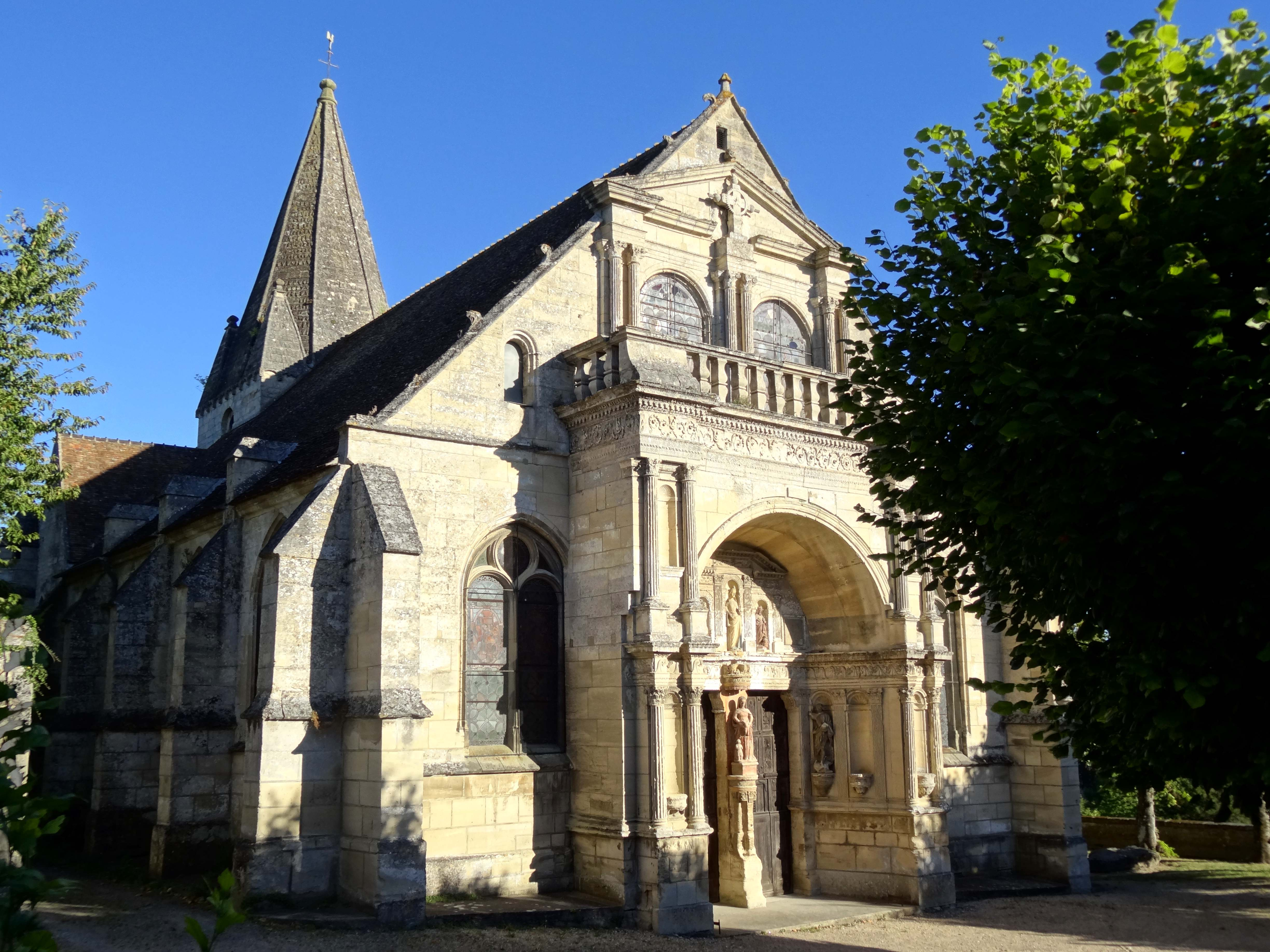
- The church of Saint-Gervais
- Location of Saint-Gervais
- Location within France Location within Île-de-France (region)
- Coordinates: 49°10′12″N 1°46′14″E
- Country: France
- Region: Île-de-France
- Department: Val-d'Oise
- Arrondissement: Pontoise
- Canton: Vauréal

Government
  - Mayor (2020–2026): Florence Binaux Le Clech
- Area^{1}: 13.18 km^{2} (5.09 sq mi)
- Highest elevation: 158 m (518 ft)
- Lowest elevation: 55 m (180 ft)
- Population (2023): 878
  - Density: 66.6/km^{2} (173/sq mi)
- Time zone: UTC+01:00 (CET)
  - Summer (DST): UTC+02:00 (CEST)
- INSEE/Postal code: 95554 /95420
- ^{1} French Land Register data, which excludes lakes, ponds, glaciers > 1 km^{2} (0.386 sq mi or 247 acres) and river estuaries.

Saint-Gervais (French pronunciation: [sɛ̃ ʒɛʁvɛ]) is a commune in the Val-d'Oise department in Île-de-France in northern France.

== See also ==
- Communes of the Val-d'Oise department
