= Aincourt =

- Commune
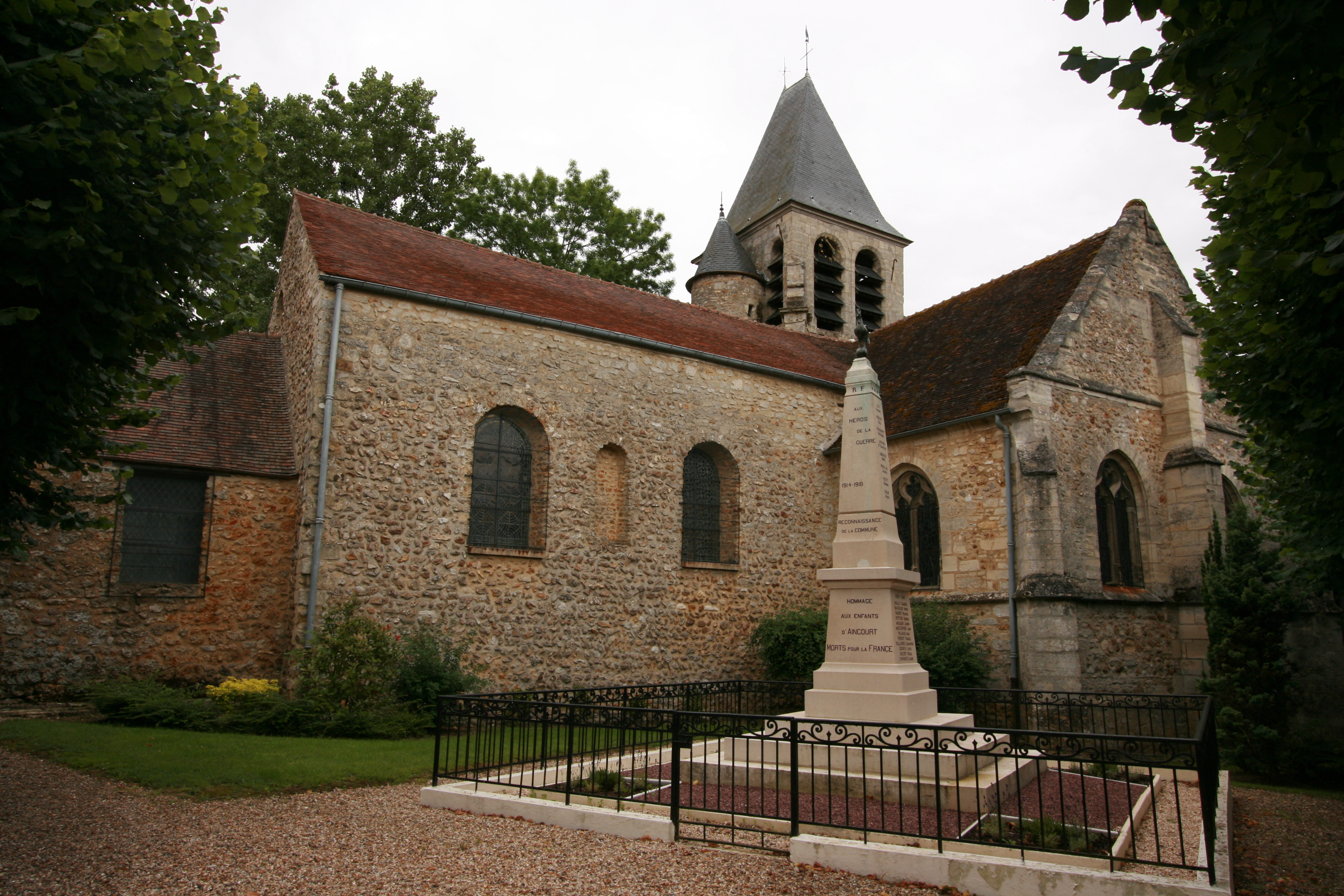
- The church of Saint-Martin, in Aincourt

- Coat of arms
- Location of Aincourt
- Location within France Location within Île-de-France (region)
- Coordinates: 49°04′24″N 1°46′25″E
- Country: France
- Region: Île-de-France
- Department: Val-d'Oise
- Arrondissement: Pontoise
- Canton: Vauréal
- Intercommunality: Vexin-Val de Seine

Government
  - Mayor (2020–2026): Emmanuel Couesnon
- Area^{1}: 10.03 km^{2} (3.87 sq mi)
- Highest elevation: 201 m (659 ft)
- Lowest elevation: 107 m (351 ft)
- Population (2023): 854
  - Density: 85.1/km^{2} (221/sq mi)
- Time zone: UTC+01:00 (CET)
  - Summer (DST): UTC+02:00 (CEST)
- INSEE/Postal code: 95008 /95510
- ^{1} French Land Register data, which excludes lakes, ponds, glaciers > 1 km^{2} (0.386 sq mi or 247 acres) and river estuaries.

Aincourt (French pronunciation: [ɛ̃kuʁ]) is a commune in the Val-d'Oise department in Île-de-France in northern France. It is located in the regional nature park of Vexin.

== Population ==
Historical population
| Year | Pop. | ±% p.a. |
|---|---|---|
| 1968 | 595 | — |
| 1975 | 530 | −1.64% |
| 1982 | 709 | +4.24% |
| 1990 | 622 | −1.62% |
| 1999 | 657 | +0.61% |
| 2007 | 913 | +4.20% |
| 2012 | 953 | +0.86% |
| 2017 | 916 | −0.79% |
| 2023 | 854 | −1.16% |
Source: INSEE

== See also ==
- Communes of the Val-d'Oise department
