= Chérence =

- Commune
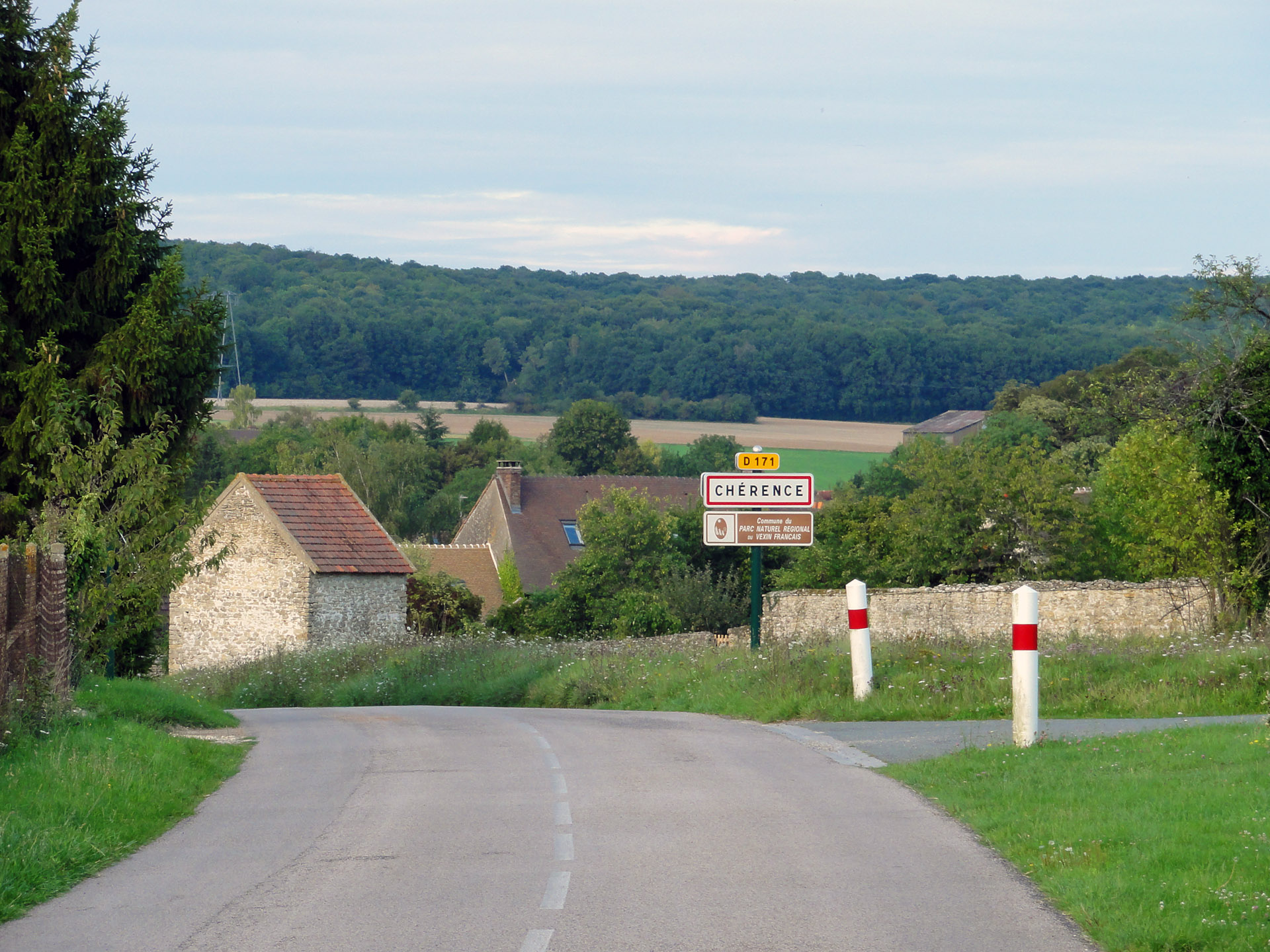
- The road into the village of Chérence

- Coat of arms
- Location of Chérence
- Location within France Location within Île-de-France (region)
- Coordinates: 49°05′24″N 1°40′38″E
- Country: France
- Region: Île-de-France
- Department: Val-d'Oise
- Arrondissement: Pontoise
- Canton: Vauréal
- Intercommunality: Vexin Val de Seine

Government
  - Mayor (2020–2026): Philippe Vandeputte
- Area^{1}: 8.47 km^{2} (3.27 sq mi)
- Highest elevation: 195 m (640 ft)
- Lowest elevation: 60 m (200 ft)
- Population (2023): 137
  - Density: 16.2/km^{2} (41.9/sq mi)
- Time zone: UTC+01:00 (CET)
  - Summer (DST): UTC+02:00 (CEST)
- INSEE/Postal code: 95157 /95510
- ^{1} French Land Register data, which excludes lakes, ponds, glaciers > 1 km^{2} (0.386 sq mi or 247 acres) and river estuaries.

Chérence (French pronunciation: [ʃeʁɑ̃s]) is a commune in the Val-d'Oise department in Île-de-France in northern France. It is located in the regional nature park of Vexin.

== Geography ==
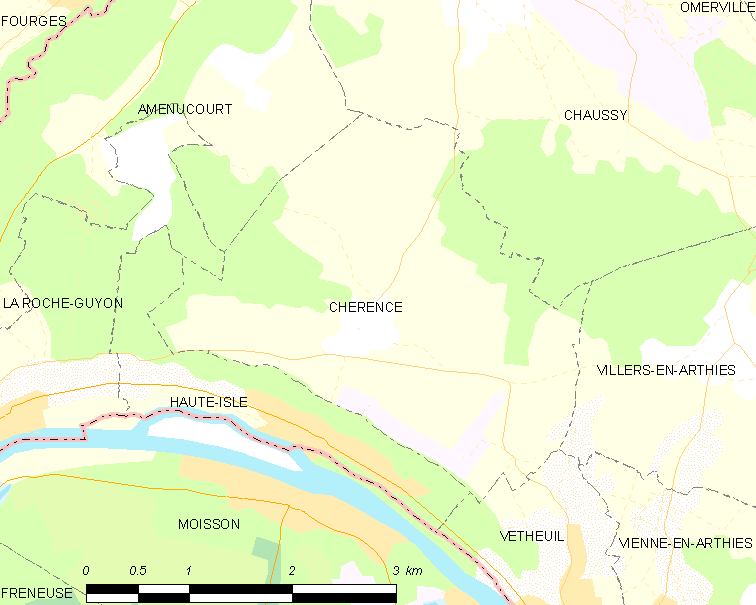
A map of the commune

Chérence is located approximately 55 km from Paris.

== See also ==
- Communes of the Val-d'Oise department
