= Maudétour-en-Vexin =

- Commune
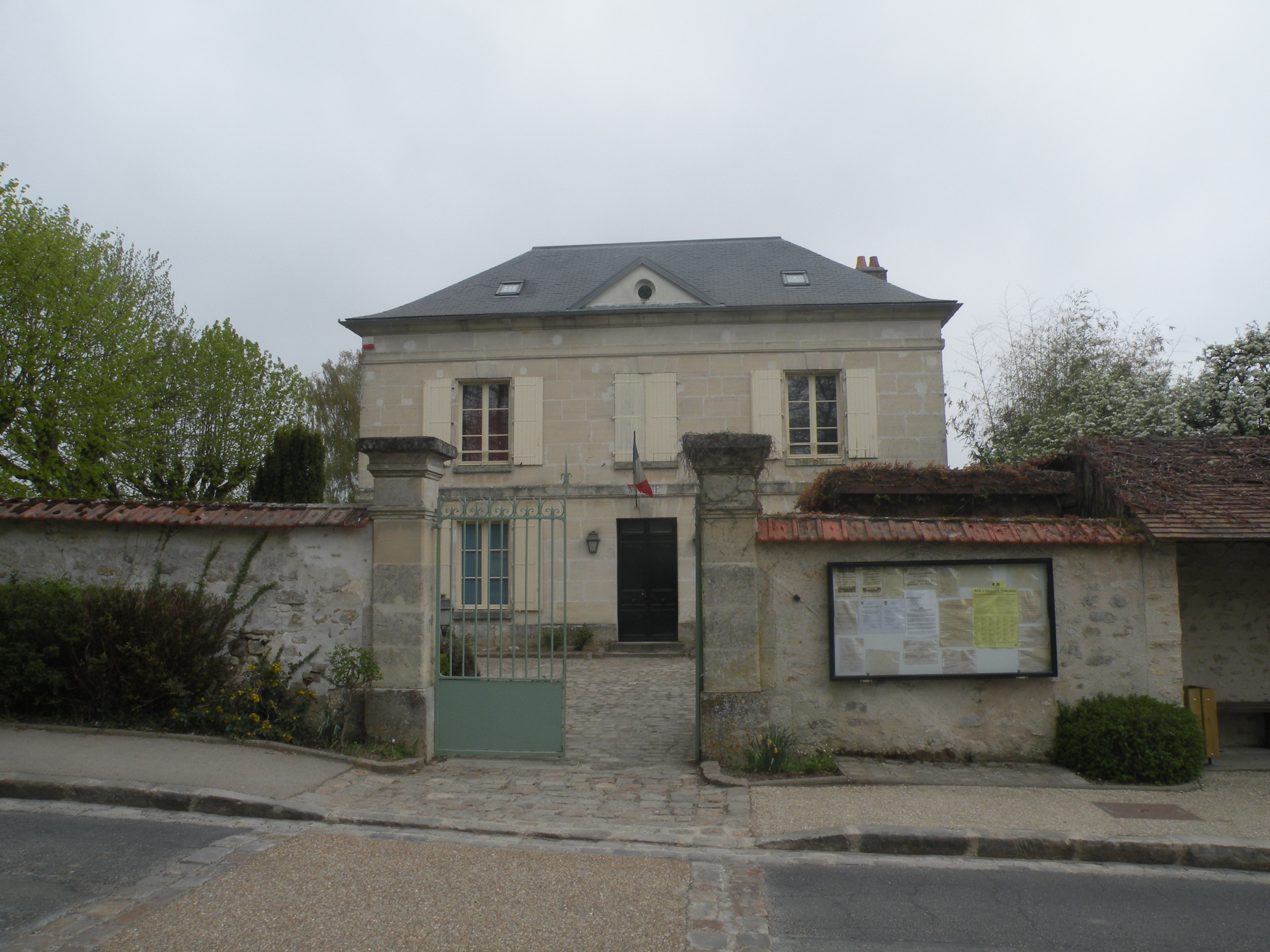
- The Town Hall

- Coat of arms
- Location of Maudétour-en-Vexin
- Location within France Location within Île-de-France (region)
- Coordinates: 49°06′02″N 1°46′32″E
- Country: France
- Region: Île-de-France
- Department: Val-d'Oise
- Arrondissement: Pontoise
- Canton: Vauréal

Government
  - Mayor (2020–2026): Didier Vermeire
- Area^{1}: 6.55 km^{2} (2.53 sq mi)
- Highest elevation: 206 m (676 ft)
- Lowest elevation: 109 m (358 ft)
- Population (2023): 208
  - Density: 31.8/km^{2} (82.2/sq mi)
- Time zone: UTC+01:00 (CET)
  - Summer (DST): UTC+02:00 (CEST)
- INSEE/Postal code: 95379 /95420
- ^{1} French Land Register data, which excludes lakes, ponds, glaciers > 1 km^{2} (0.386 sq mi or 247 acres) and river estuaries.

Maudétour-en-Vexin (French pronunciation: [modetuʁ ɑ̃ vɛksɛ̃], literally Maudétour in Vexin) is a commune in the Val-d'Oise department in Île-de-France in northern France. It is located in the regional nature park of Vexin.

== Geography ==
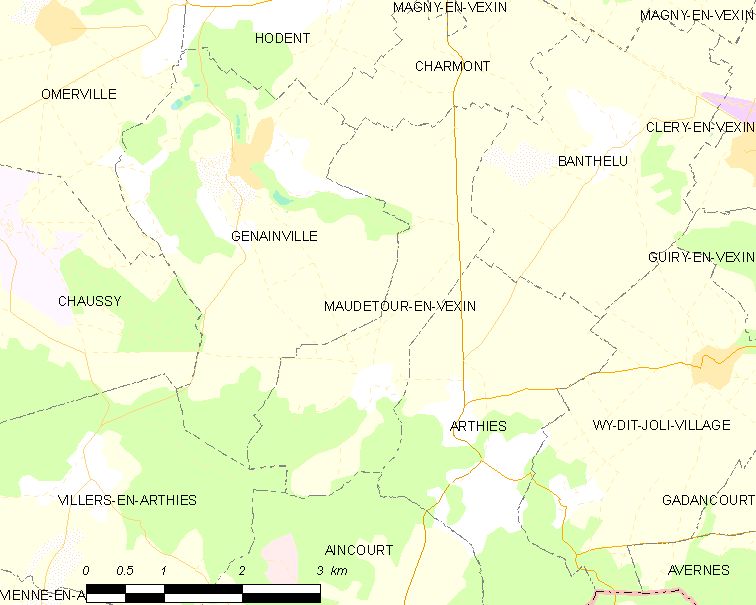
A map of the commune

It is located approximately 50 km from Paris.

== See also ==
- Communes of the Val-d'Oise department
