= Blankass =

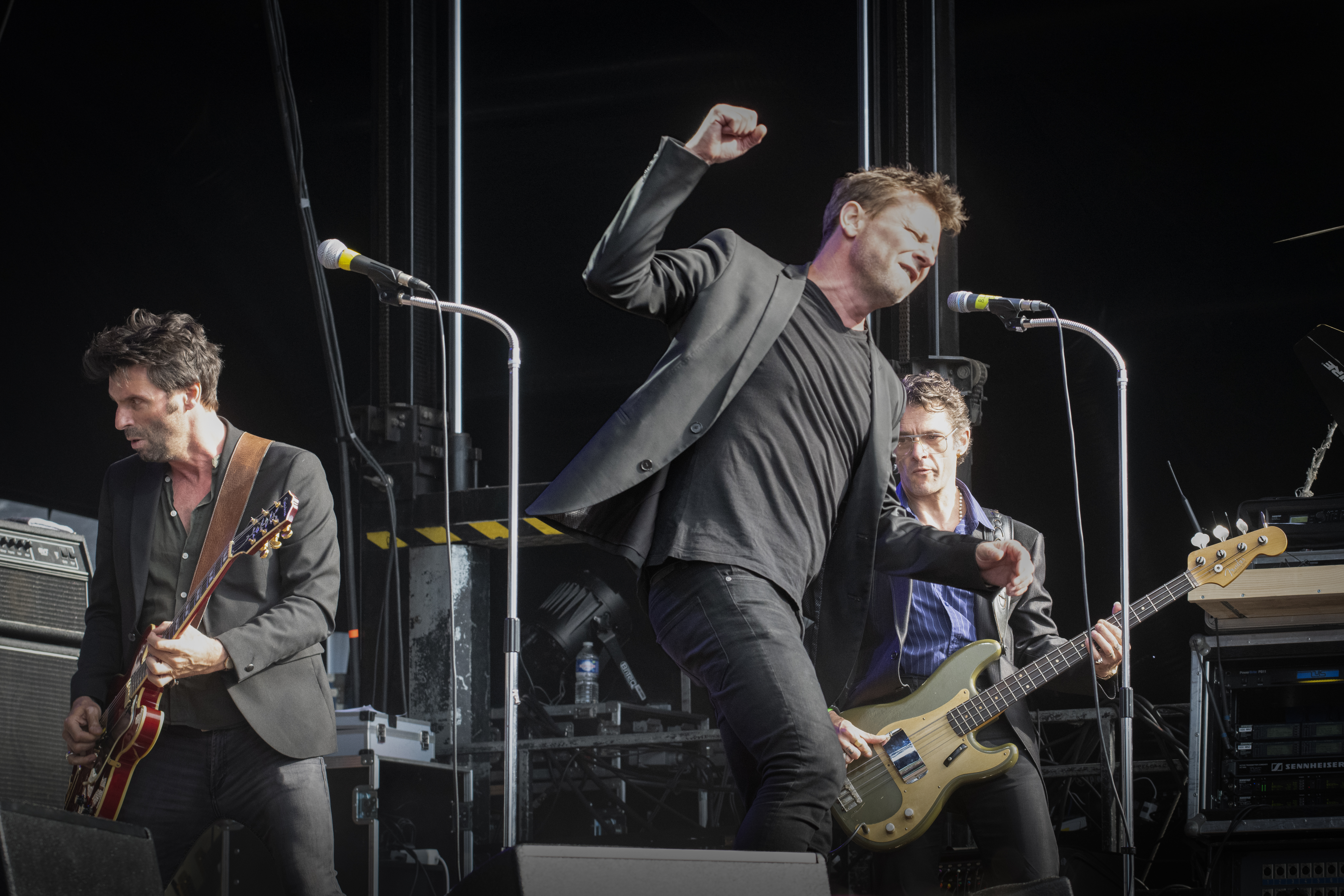
- Blankass, performing at the "Le Murmure du son" Festival on July 13, 2024 at Eu

Background information
- Origin: Berry, France, France
- Genres: Rock music in France, folk
- Years active: Since 1990
- Labels: JGN, At(h)ome
- Members: Guillaume Ledoux; Johan Ledoux; Cédric Milard; Charlie Poggio; Jerôme Legrand; Alain Verderosa
- Website: www.blankass.com

Blankass is a French rock group originating from the Indre department, in the former province of Berry. It was formed by brothers Johan and Guillaume Ledoux in 1990.

== Biography ==
Blankass was formed in 1990 by brothers Johan and Guillaume Ledoux, both originally from Issoudun, and two former members of the punk rock band Zéro de conduite. Their first album was released in 1996 under the title Blankass, recorded after a series of concerts. Then, the group released their second album, L'Ère de rien, on September 2, 1998, which they had been working on since autumn 1997. Unlike the first album, which was produced from their extensive tours, this album was conceived, written, and recorded in the studio. After being recorded just before Christmas 1997, the album was mixed in Wales, Great Britain. Between November and December 1998, the group embarked on a French tour of 20 dates, including a stop at the Bataclan in Paris on December 14. In the same year, their album sold over 50,000 copies in just a few months.

Between 1995 and 2003, Blankass was one of the leading rock groups in France.

Blankass participated in concerts and the release of an album for Free Tibet. They also support irregular immigrants with a track on the GISTI CD and by supporting Zolboot, a Mongolian child threatened with deportation.

The group released their first best-of album, Je me souviens de tout, on April 14, 2014.

In 2020, they returned with a new album, C'est quoi ton nom ?.

In 2023, they released the album Si possible heureux, featuring three duets with Stephan Eicher, Gauvain Sers, and Vianney.

== Current members ==
- Guillaume Ledoux — vocals, accordion
- Johan Ledoux – guitar, vocals
- Charlie Poggio – drums (after 1994 and before August 2006)
- Cédric Milard – keyboard (since 2005)
- Alain Verderosa – bass (since 2019)
- Jérôme Legrand – guitar (since 2019)

== Previous members ==
- Bruno Marande – bass (1994–2008)
- Philippe Ribaudeau — flute, saxophone, harmonica (1990–2008)
- Olivier Robineau – drums (1994–2006)
- Nicolas Combrouze – guitar (1990–2005)
- François Poggio – guitar (2007–2008)
- Nicolas Bravin — guitar (2005–2006)
- Pierre Simon – guitar (2011–2014)
- Sabine Quinet – bass (2011–2014)

== Discography ==
=== Studio albums ===
- 1996 – Blankass
- 1999 – L'Ère de rien
- 2003 – L'Homme fleur
- 2005 – Elliott
- 2012 – Les Chevals
- 2020 – C'est quoi ton nom ?
- 2023 – Si possible heureux

=== Compilations et Albums en public ===
- 2008 – Un concert
- 2014 – Je me souviens de tout (Compilation: Includes their hits, rarities, covers, and unreleased tracks.)

== See also ==
- Official website: www.blankass.com
- Old website: www.blankass.fr
