= Crime of solidarity =

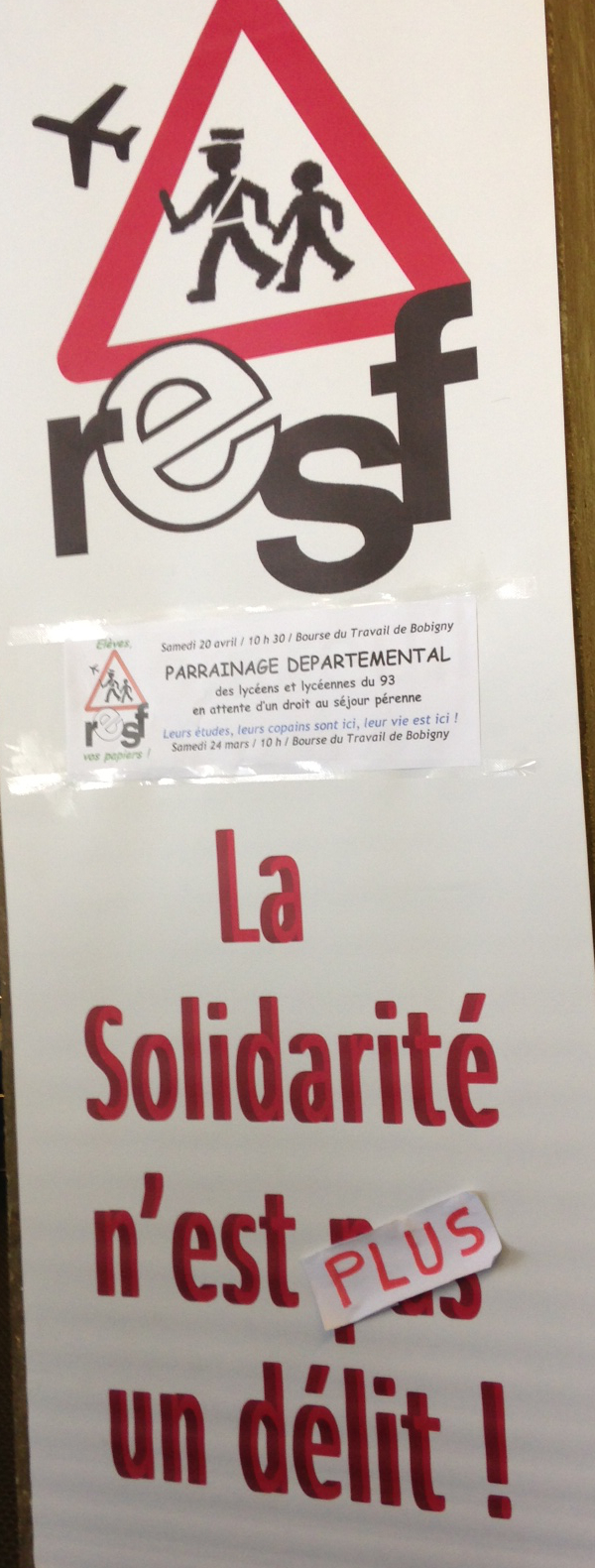
Poster symbolising the repeal of the offence of solidarity on 19 April 2013 in Bobigny during the sponsorship of RESF 93, it reads "Solidarity is no longer an offence!"

A crime of solidarity or offence of solidarity (French: crime de solidarité or French: délit de solidarité) is a concept coined in France by human rights activists in order to fight against organised illegal immigration networks as well as fight against laws that prevent refuge for refugees. The concept has become increasingly popular as a response to the refugee crisis in Europe, the crimes of solidarity are principally seen in France, Italy, Spain and Greece.

It refers to the process when people help refugees and migrants and these actions are criminalised by European courts. There are a range of laws that criminalise these actions, such as laws against facilitation of entry (smuggling) and stay, anti-terror and anti-organised crime laws, anti-protest laws, endangering maritime and airport security, driving an unsafe vessel, espionage, criminal association and membership of a criminal association or network. It affects largely civil society organisations and individuals such as refugee activists, health workers and boat captains as well as refugees trying to help other people migrating.

== Origin and application ==
Initially the laws used to criminalise these acts targeted traffickers, however they are now being used against activists or politicians who militate in favour of refugees and asylum seekers, as well as those who protest against deportations by air and those who try to help migrants stuck at sea.

Intimidation, prosecution and convictions of activists and the general public trying to help refugees and asylum seekers has triggered a collective movement, coined "crime de solidarité" or a crime of solidarity, referring to these acts providing aide to refugees and asylum seekers.

== Legislation ==
=== European Laws ===
These acts are often criminalised in accordance with the 2002 European Directive which prevents and punishes "the facilitation of the unauthorised entry, transit and residence" of migrants.

=== French Laws ===
A crime of solidarity has no legal existence in France, first appearing at the Groupe d'information et de soutien des immigrés (GISTI) in 1995.

On 6 July 2018, the Constitutional Council ruled that it was partially unconstitutional to criminalise anyone who facilitates the illegal entry or residence of a foreigner in France, referring to the "crime de solidarité" or the "délit de solidarité".

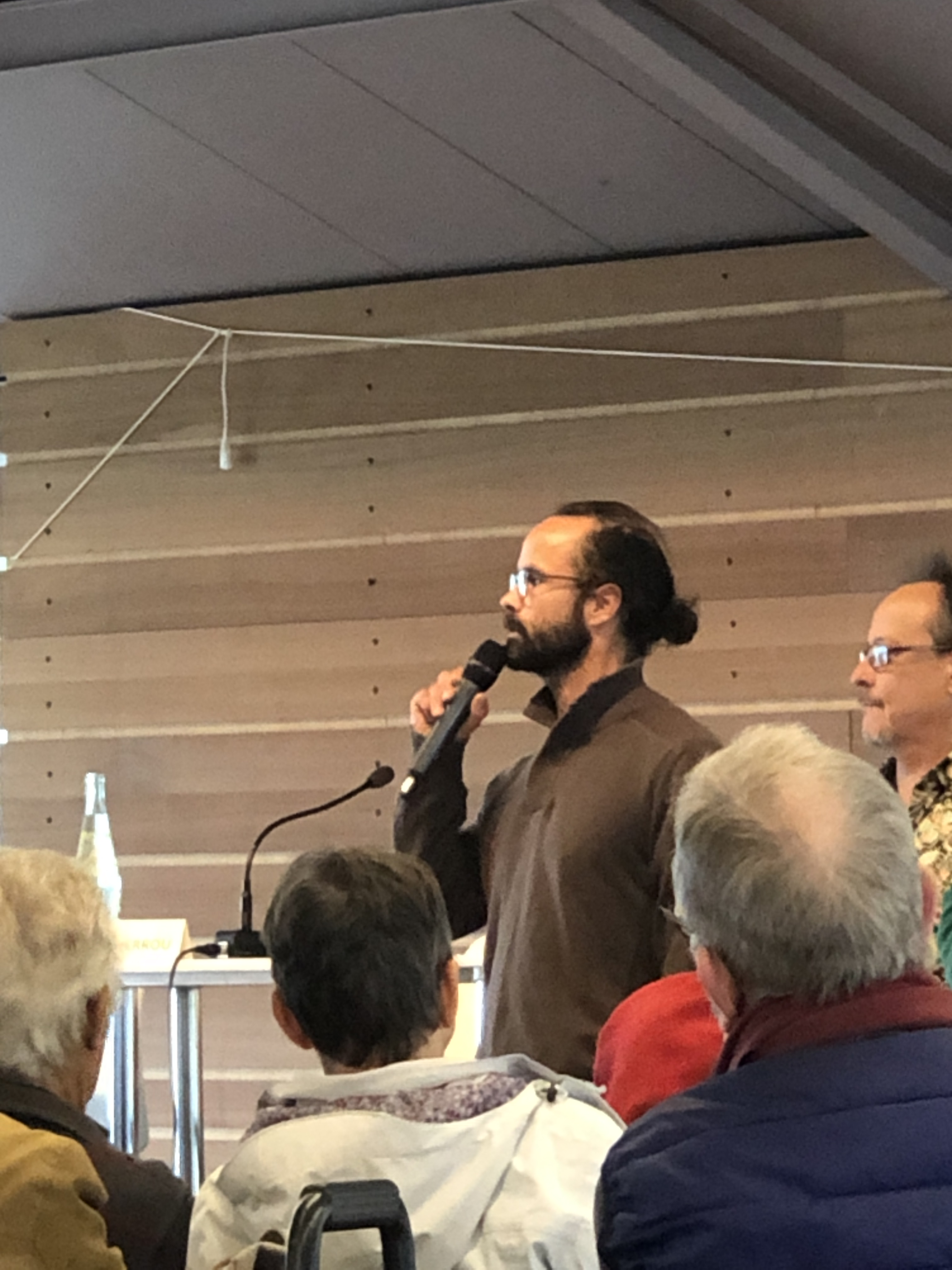
Cédric Herrou

== Cédric Herrou ==
Cédric Herrou is a French olive farmer and immigration activist, famous for his crimes of solidarity. Known internationally for helping 250 migrants cross from Italy to France, which caused his arrest. These actions were later ruled legal by the French Constitutional Council under the "principal of fraternity".

== Martine Landry ==
Martine Landry is a 73 year old French woman who could face up to five years in prison and a fine of €30,000 for helping two 15 year old Guinean asylum seekers in France. According to Landry, while situated on the French side of the Menton-Vintimille border crossing between France and Italy, she saw two Italian police officers returning two young men to the French side of the border. After waiting for the two boys to enter the French side, she helped the minors deliver a document requesting that they be placed in the custody of France's child welfare agency (where the two now remain). She now faces criminal charges because of this, despite French law stating that it is the agency's obligation to take into care any underage, foreign nationals who enter France unaccompanied.
