= Guillaume Ledoux =

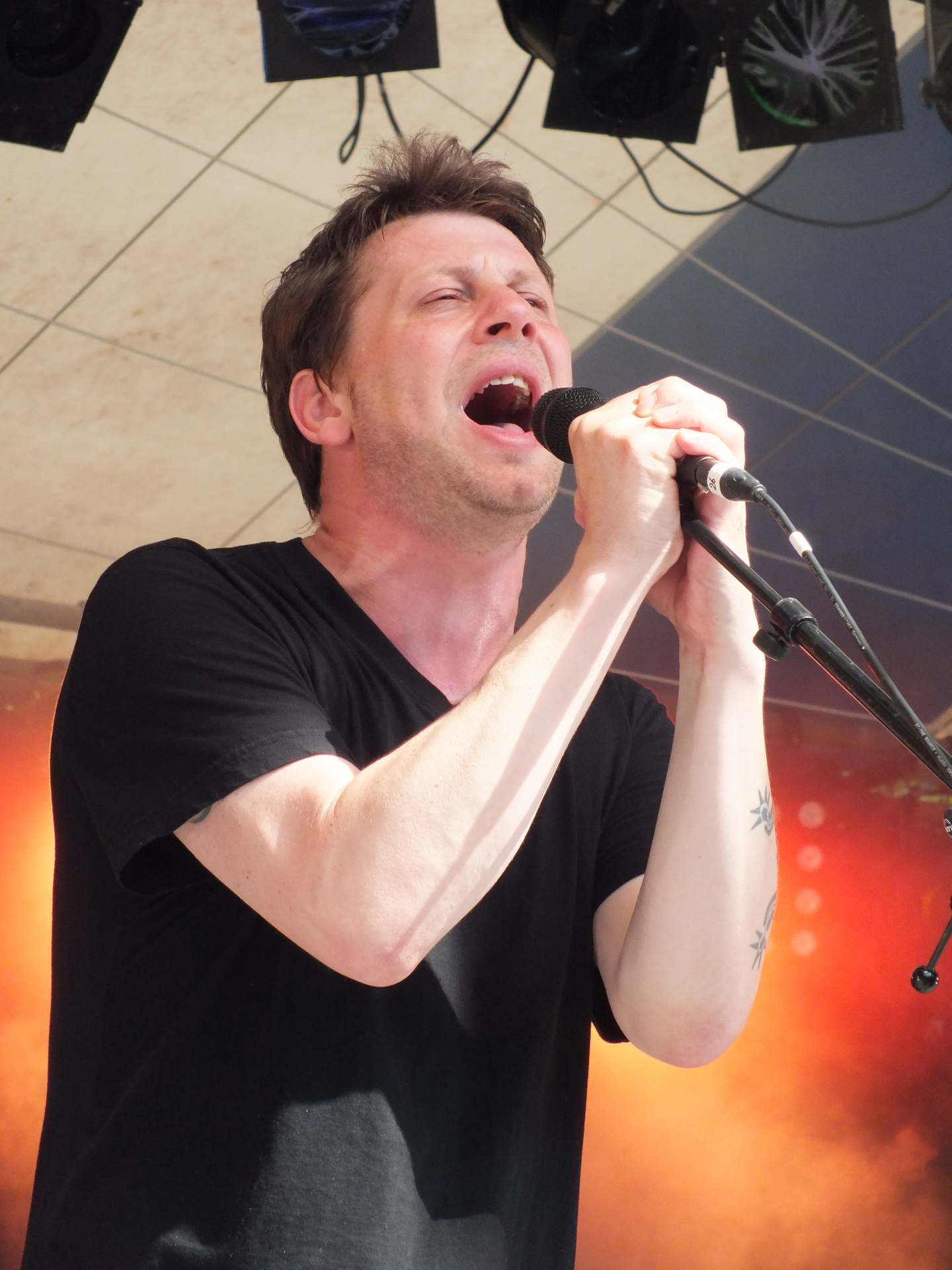
- Guillaume Ledoux avec Blankass à Presles en 2012

Background information
- Born: Guillaume Ledoux; December 26, 1970 (age 55); Châteauroux, France
- Genres: Folk, rock music
- Occupations: singer, accordionist, lyricist, painter, writer
- Years active: Since 1990
- Label: At(h)ome
- Website: blankass.com/guillaumeledoux/

Guillaume Ledoux is a French musician and painter born on December 26, 1970, in Châteauroux. He formed the bands Zéro de conduite and Blankass.

== Biography ==
In 1981, he formed the band Zéro de conduite with his brother Johan, his friend Franck Leblanc, and their cousin Anne-Sophie. They performed on several local stages until they had an unexpected encounter with Jeffrey Lee Pierce at a train station. The singer of The Gun Club insisted that they play with him at the Printemps de Bourges festival. They then opened for concerts by The Gun Club and U2, with an average age of around 12.

In 1984, the group signed with RCA Records. In March of that same year, Joe Strummer chose them to open for The Clash at Paris Baltard. This was followed by dozens of concerts on both sides of the Atlantic, meetings and collaborations with The Inmates, Johnny Thunders, The Lords of the New Church, and even Serge Gainsbourg.

In 1990, Guillaume and Johan formed a new band, Blankass, which blends rock, folk, and chanson influences, as well as electric and traditional instruments. After 200 concerts in various venues across France, Belgium, Germany, the Netherlands, and Algeria, their first album was released in January 1996. Their debut single, La couleur des blés, aired on the radio. The group was nominated for the Victoires de la Musique award as the musical revelation of the year, and the album sold over 150,000 copies. This was followed by a tour of 150 dates.

In 1998, their second album L'Ère de rien was released, and they were nominated for the Victoires again, this time in the "Group of the Year" category. Blankass continued to tour and release albums with L'homme-fleur, Elliott, and more recently, Un concert, the group's first live album accompanied by a DVD featuring archived performances, music videos, and concert footage.

Beginning in 2005 during the recording of Elliott, Guillaume started composing and writing more personal works closer to his taste for French chanson and his love for Trenet, Gainsbourg, Perret, Brel, etc. In 2008, he began a tour with this project in collaboration with his publisher, Strictly-Confidential, and his pianist, Cédric Milard.

His first acoustic EP was released digitally in April 2010 on all legal download platforms via the label Idol. It includes six stripped-down tracks, including "À terre," inspired by the life of his friend Fabrice Bénichou. While waiting for the album "Les à-peu-près," Guillaume continues to perform throughout France with his band Blankass.

Guillaume also paints, and his canvases feature large, chunky figures. The two recurring characters in his paintings are Le gros Mathieu and Monsieur Roger.
