= 2018 Citizen and Solidarity March (France) =

Walk for refugees in France

In 2018, humanitarian organization L'Auberge des Migrants organised a march, supporting migrants, from Vintimille in southern France, at the Italian border to London, England. The route, around 1400 km followed the route by refugees trying to reach the United Kingdom from southern Europe.

The march started on April 30 and ended at London, England on July 8.

== March ==
At the beginning, one minute of silence was observed in memory of the 17 refugees who died trying to cross the French-Italian border since June 2015. This takes place one week after the vote of a new law restricting again the right of asylum for refugees, and after the tentative of blocking the border by a group of extreme-right activists. The court refused to act against these activists, while people helping refugees in need have to face legal problems.

== Notable participants ==
Among the participants are members of the European parliament, José Bové and Marie-Christine Vergiat, Cédric Herrou, a farmer who was facing charges for helping migrants crossing into France, singer Alexis HK, and Catholic Bishop Jacques Gaillot.
