= Gauvain Sers =

French singer (born 1989)

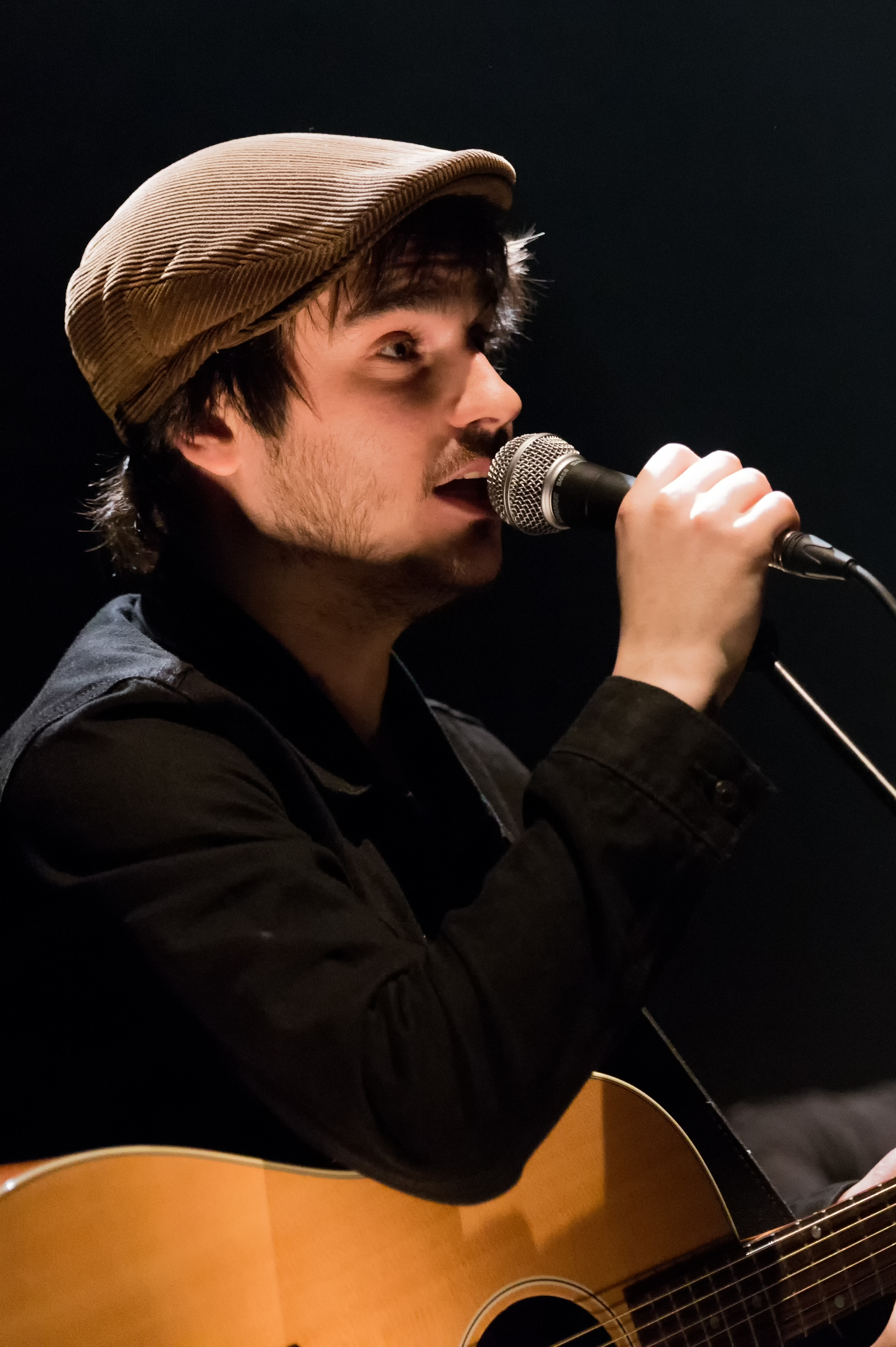
- Sers performing in 2017

Background information
- Born: 30 October 1989 (age 36); Limoges, France
- Genres: French chanson
- Occupations: Singer, songwriter
- Years active: 2016-present
- Label: Fontana
- Website: gauvainsers.fr

Gauvain Sers (French pronunciation: [ɡovɛ̃ sɛʁs]; born 30 October 1989 in Limoges) is a French singer-songwriter.

His first album released on Fontana Records 9 June 2017 and titled Pourvu was certified platinum. The follow-up Les Oubliés also on Fontana Records debuted at number 2 on the French Albums Chart.

== Biography ==
=== Early life ===
Born in Limoges, Gauvain Sers grew up in Dun-le-Palestel, Creuse. His father is a math teacher and his mother, Corinne, is a pharmacist; he has three brothers. After his scientific baccalaureate, he went to study in preparatory scientific classes in Paris, then joined the ENSEEIHT engineering school in Toulouse. Then, he took lessons in musical composition and writing at the Manufacture Chanson in Paris.

=== Debuts ===
From October 2016, he was chosen by Renaud to be the opening act of his Phénix Tour, for over 75 concert dates. He also participates in various television and radio shows with the singer, in particular Merci Renaud on France 2 alongside Julien Clerc, Patrick Bruel and Bénabar. At the same time, he opened for Tryo and Yves Jamait. He performed headlining at the Café de la Danse in Paris on 24 March and 29 April 2017.

=== Pourvu ===
His first album Pourvu, certified platinum disc, was released on 9 June 2017 on the Fontana Records label with the titles Pourvu, Hénin-Beaumont, Mon fils est parti au djihad and Entre République et Nation. The clip of Pourvu was directed by filmmaker Jean-Pierre Jeunet with the participation of actors Jean-Pierre Darroussin and Gérard Darmon and actress Alexia Giordano. In February 2018, he was nominated for the "audivisual creation" category at the 33rd Victoires de la Musique ceremony.

In autumn 2017 the Pourvu Tour began, it went through La Cigale de Paris on 5 October 2017. Govrache and Clio were chosen to ensure the opening of the concerts. On 22 March 2018 Gauvain Sers performed for the first time on the stage of the Olympia.

In March 2018 the clip of Dans mes poches was produced by Biscuit Prod in the style of the comic strip, with drawings made by André Juillard.

On 1 March 2018 Gauvain Sers was the sponsor of the eighth Georges-Moustaki prize. In December 2018, Gauvain Sers was elected Limousin of the year 2018.

=== Les oubliés ===
In December 2018, Gauvain Sers released the song Les Oubliés which talks about rural areas and the “left behind” in today's French society which operates “at two speeds”. This song was inspired by the regrets and memories of a teacher from the school of Ponthoile in the Somme, which was closed in 2018. He made a documentary of it, broadcast in several parts on YouTube. The first part was released on 25 January 2019. From February to April, he made an acoustic tour in the “forgotten cities” of France, such as Tilloy-lès-Mofflaines, Ponthoile or Dun-le-Palestel. Gauvain Sers released in March 2019 a new title, Que restera-t-il de nous ?, written by author Michel Bussi. This ballad is also present in Bussi's book J'ai dû rêver trop fort, in the form of an extract before each chapter. His second album, entitled Les Oubliés, was released on 29 March 2019. It was certified gold in ten weeks and platinum in December 2019, which is equivalent to more than 100,000 sales. It was the 35th best-selling album in 2019.

=== À Samuel Paty ===
In October 2020, during the ceremony at the Place de la Sorbonne in tribute to Professor Samuel Paty, assassinated in Conflans-Sainte-Honorine, a poem by Gauvain Sers composed for the occasion was read.

== Discography ==
=== Albums ===
Title	Year	Peak positions			Certification
Title	Year	FRA	BEL (Wa)	SWI	Certification
Pourvu	2017	1	7	31	Platinum
Les oubliés	2019	2	12	20	
Ta place dans ce monde	2021	2	7	—	

=== Singles ===
==== As lead artist ====
Title	Year	Peak positions		Album
Title	Year	FRA	BEL (Wa)	Album
"Pourvu"	2016	103	28* (Ultratip)	Pourvu
"Dans mes poches"	2017	–	30* (Ultratip)	Pourvu

*Did not appear in the official Belgian Ultratop 50 charts, but rather in the bubbling under Ultratip charts.
