= Bernes-sur-Oise =

- Commune
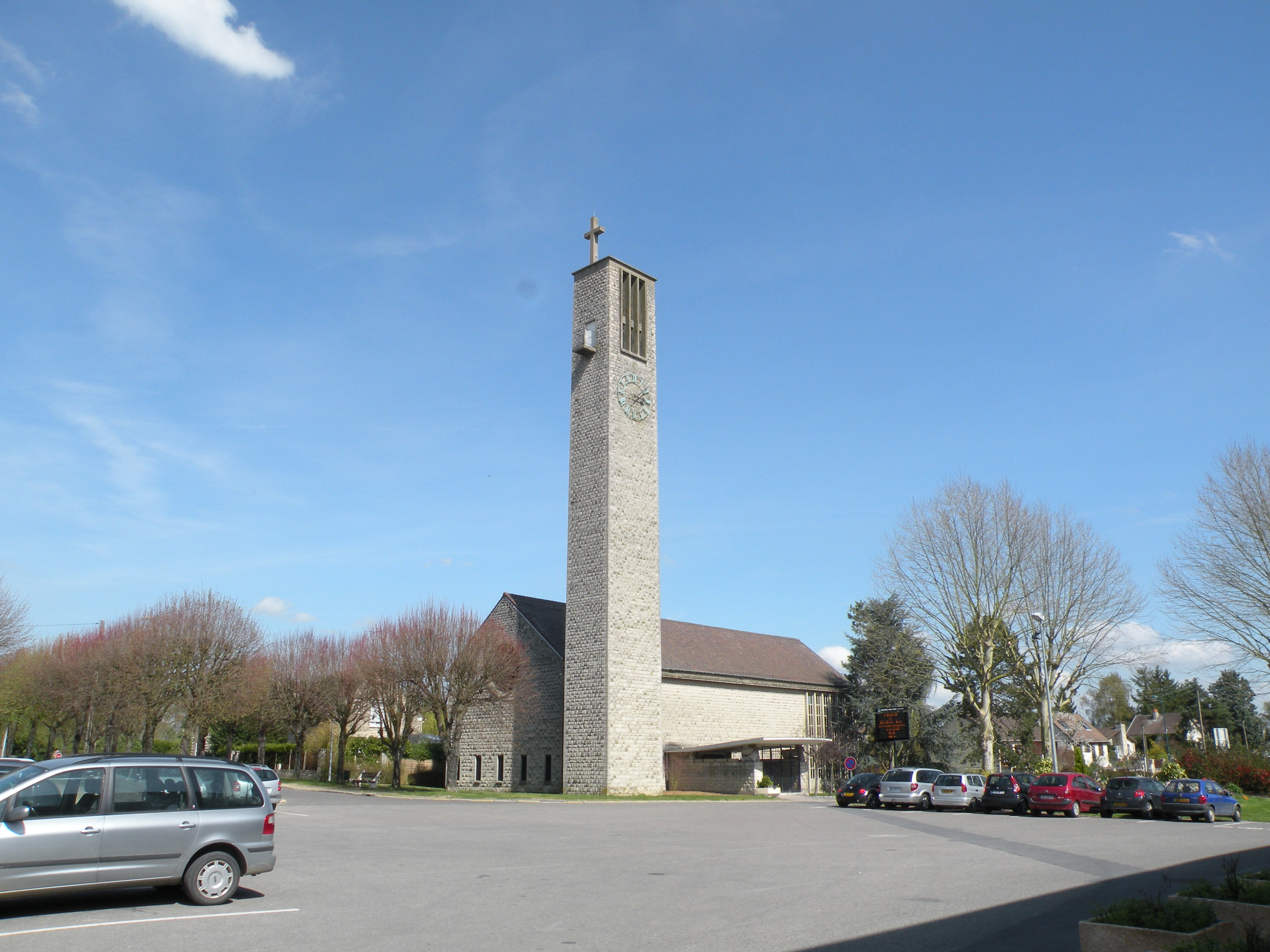
- The church of Saint-Denis

- Coat of arms
- Location of Bernes-sur-Oise
- Location within France Location within Île-de-France (region)
- Coordinates: 49°09′42″N 2°18′05″E
- Country: France
- Region: Île-de-France
- Department: Val-d'Oise
- Arrondissement: Pontoise
- Canton: L'Isle-Adam
- Intercommunality: Haut Val-d'Oise

Government
  - Mayor (2020–2026): Olivier Anty
- Area^{1}: 5.45 km^{2} (2.10 sq mi)
- Highest elevation: 81 m (266 ft)
- Lowest elevation: 24 m (79 ft)
- Population (2023): 2,684
  - Density: 492/km^{2} (1,280/sq mi)
- Time zone: UTC+01:00 (CET)
  - Summer (DST): UTC+02:00 (CEST)
- INSEE/Postal code: 95058 /95340
- ^{1} French Land Register data, which excludes lakes, ponds, glaciers > 1 km^{2} (0.386 sq mi or 247 acres) and river estuaries.

Bernes-sur-Oise (French pronunciation: [bɛʁn syʁ waz], literally Bernes on Oise) is a commune in the Val-d'Oise department in Île-de-France, France.

== Population ==
Historical population
Year	Pop.	±% p.a.
1968	1,040	—
1975	1,402	+4.36%
1982	1,363	−0.40%
1990	2,434	+7.52%
1999	2,220	−1.02%
2007	2,363	+0.78%
2012	2,399	+0.30%
2017	2,708	+2.45%
2023	2,684	−0.15%
Source: INSEE

== See also ==
- Communes of the Val-d'Oise department
