= Bruyères-sur-Oise =

- Commune
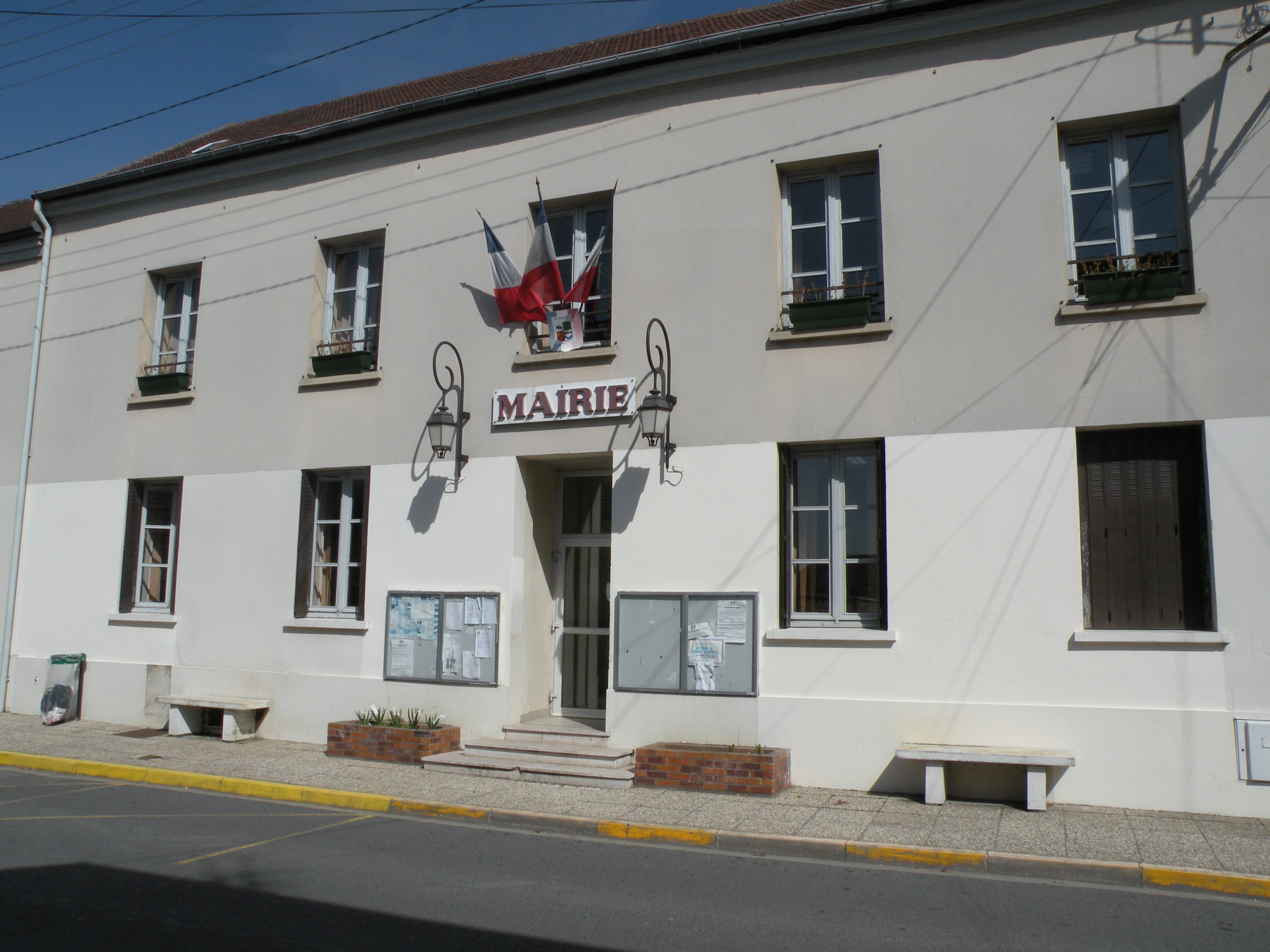
- The town hall of Bruyères-sur-Oise

- Coat of arms
- Location of Bruyères-sur-Oise
- Location within France Location within Île-de-France (region)
- Coordinates: 49°09′27″N 2°19′42″E
- Country: France
- Region: Île-de-France
- Department: Val-d'Oise
- Arrondissement: Pontoise
- Canton: L'Isle-Adam
- Intercommunality: Haut Val-d'Oise

Government
  - Mayor (2020–2026): Alain Garbe
- Area^{1}: 8.91 km^{2} (3.44 sq mi)
- Highest elevation: 84 m (276 ft)
- Lowest elevation: 23 m (75 ft)
- Population (2023): 4,921
  - Density: 552/km^{2} (1,430/sq mi)
- Time zone: UTC+01:00 (CET)
  - Summer (DST): UTC+02:00 (CEST)
- INSEE/Postal code: 95116 /95820
- ^{1} French Land Register data, which excludes lakes, ponds, glaciers > 1 km^{2} (0.386 sq mi or 247 acres) and river estuaries.

Bruyères-sur-Oise (French pronunciation: [bʁɥijɛʁ syʁ waz], literally Bruyères on Oise) is a commune in the Val-d'Oise department in Île-de-France in northern France.

== Population ==
Historical population
Year	Pop.	±% p.a.
1968	962	—
1975	1,582	+7.36%
1982	1,546	−0.33%
1990	3,162	+9.36%
1999	3,391	+0.78%
2007	3,297	−0.35%
2012	3,976	+3.82%
2017	4,323	+1.69%
2023	4,921	+2.18%
Source: INSEE

== See also ==
- Communes of the Val-d'Oise department
