= Nointel, Val-d'Oise =

Nointel
- Commune
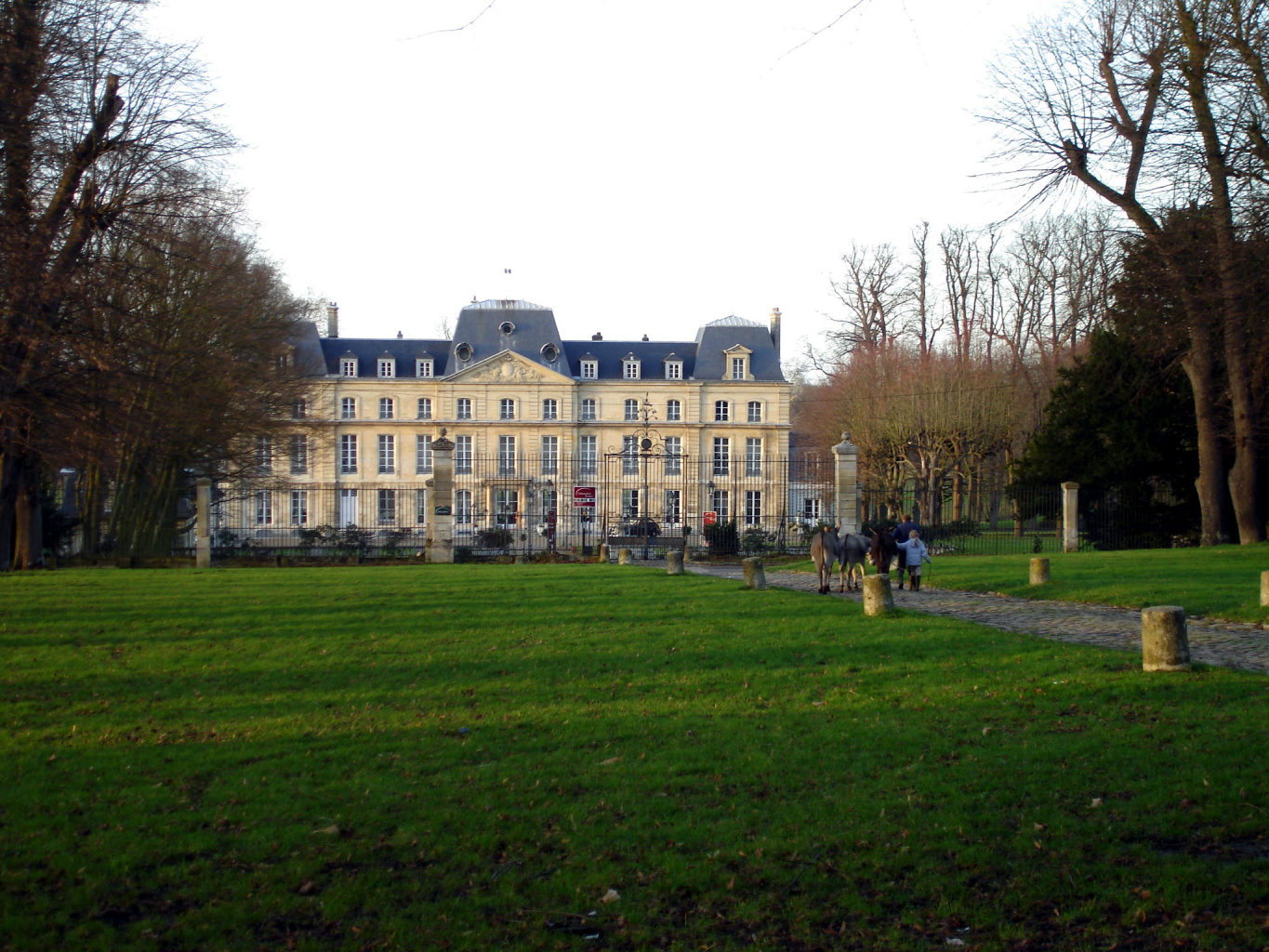
- Château de Nointel

- Coat of arms
- Location of Nointel
- Location within France Location within Île-de-France (region)
- Coordinates: 49°07′43″N 2°17′30″E
- Country: France
- Region: Île-de-France
- Department: Val-d'Oise
- Arrondissement: Pontoise
- Canton: L'Isle-Adam
- Intercommunality: Haut Val-d'Oise

Government
  - Mayor (2020–2026): Martine Legrand
- Area^{1}: 3.20 km^{2} (1.24 sq mi)
- Highest elevation: 210 m (690 ft)
- Lowest elevation: 24 m (79 ft)
- Population (2023): 903
  - Density: 282/km^{2} (731/sq mi)
- Time zone: UTC+01:00 (CET)
  - Summer (DST): UTC+02:00 (CEST)
- INSEE/Postal code: 95452 /95590
- ^{1} French Land Register data, which excludes lakes, ponds, glaciers > 1 km^{2} (0.386 sq mi or 247 acres) and river estuaries.

Nointel (French pronunciation: [nwɛ̃tɛl]) is a commune in the Val-d'Oise department in Île-de-France in northern France. Nointel - Mours station has rail connections to Persan, Sarcelles and Paris.

== See also ==
- Communes of the Val-d'Oise department
