= Pierre de Chambly =

Pierre de Chambly (c. 1260 – 18 January 1308), also known as Pierre the Fat (French: Pierre le Gras), Pierre VI de Chambly, or Pierre III de Chambly, was a French noble who served as chamberlain under King Philip IV of France. He was lord of Viarmes, Livry, Presles, Torigny, and (briefly) Tournan.

== Life ==
Pierre was born around 1260, the son of Pierre the Hideous, lord of Chambly (seigneur de Chambly). In 1277, he married Jeanne de Machault, daughter of the chamberlain Pierre de Machault. Her dowry included 65 livres of rent and 33 arpents (about 16.9 hectares or 42 acres) at Chapendu which were sold for 150 livres (about 12 kg or 26 lb of fine silver) to St. Magloire in Paris in 1289.

His father successively provided him with the lordships of Presles (seigneur de Presles) and, in 1285, Livry (seigneur de Livry). By 1288, he was also lord of Viarmes. He purchased the lordship of Torigny (seigneur de Torigny) in Normandy from Queen Margaret of Naples for 9500 livres tournois (about 768 kg or 1,700 lb of fine silver). In May 1293, he purchased the lordship of Tournan (seigneur de Tournan) from Jean II de Garlande; he ceded it in October of the same year to Charles, count of Valois. In 1302, he gave King Philip IV special hunting privileges in the forests of Livry.

During the Franco-Flemish War, he led a contingent of 6 knights and 26 squires in the 1297 campaign and fought again in 1302 after the French defeat at Courtrai. While serving as grand chamberlain for Philip IV, he participated in the negotiations over the 1303 Treaty of Paris finally ending the 1294–1303 Gascon War following the Battle of the Golden Spurs, allowing France to prosecute the rest of the Franco-Flemish War with greater success.

He died on 18 January 1308. His father died two years later in 1310 and his wife 23 years later in 1331. Their children were Pierre the Younger (Pierre le Jeune), who succeeded him to the lordship of Viarmes and Livry and who married Isabelle de Bourgogne; Philippe, who became lord of Livry and who married Jeanne de Trie; Jean, a knight; Pierre or Jean-Pierre, archdeacon of Thérouanne; Louis, archdeacon of Chartres; Marie; Louise, who married Robert d'Estouteville; Isabeau, who married Jean de Rouvray; Jeanne, lady of Montgobert, who married Robert de Clermont in 1312; and Marguerite, who married Gilles de Clary and lived until 1371.
