= Presles–Courcelles station =

French railway station

Presles–Courcelles
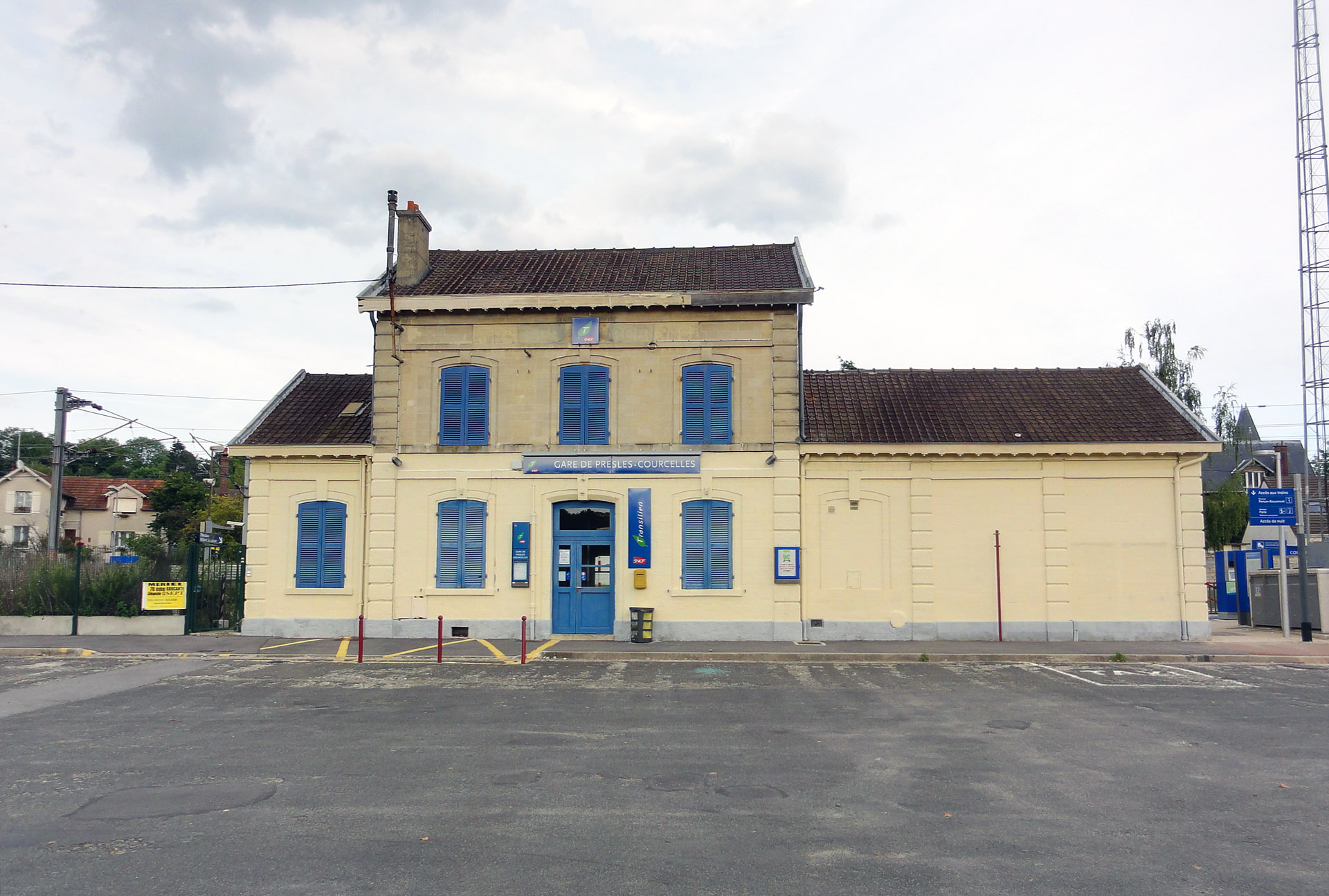
- Station building

General information
- Location: Place du Général Leclerc; 95590 Presles, France
- Coordinates: 49°6′49″N 2°17′16″E
- Owner: SNCF
- Line: Épinay-Villetaneuse–Le Tréport-Mers railway
- Platforms: 2 outside
- Tracks: 2

Construction
- Parking: 300

Other information
- Station code: 87276501
- Fare zone: 5

History
- Opened: 1880

Passengers
- 2002: fewer than 500

Services
Preceding station	Transilien	Following station
Montsoult–Maffliers towards Paris-Nord	Line H	Nointel - Mours towards Persan–Beaumont
Location

The Presles–Courcelles station (French pronunciation: [pʁɛl kuʁsɛl]) is a railway station in Presles (Val d'Oise department), France, near the hamlet of Courcelles. It is located on the Épinay-Villetaneuse–Le Tréport-Mers railway. The station is served by Transilien line H trains from Paris to Persan-Beaumont. The Nord railway company opened the line from Épinay to Persan–Beaumont in 1877.
