= Mours =

- Commune
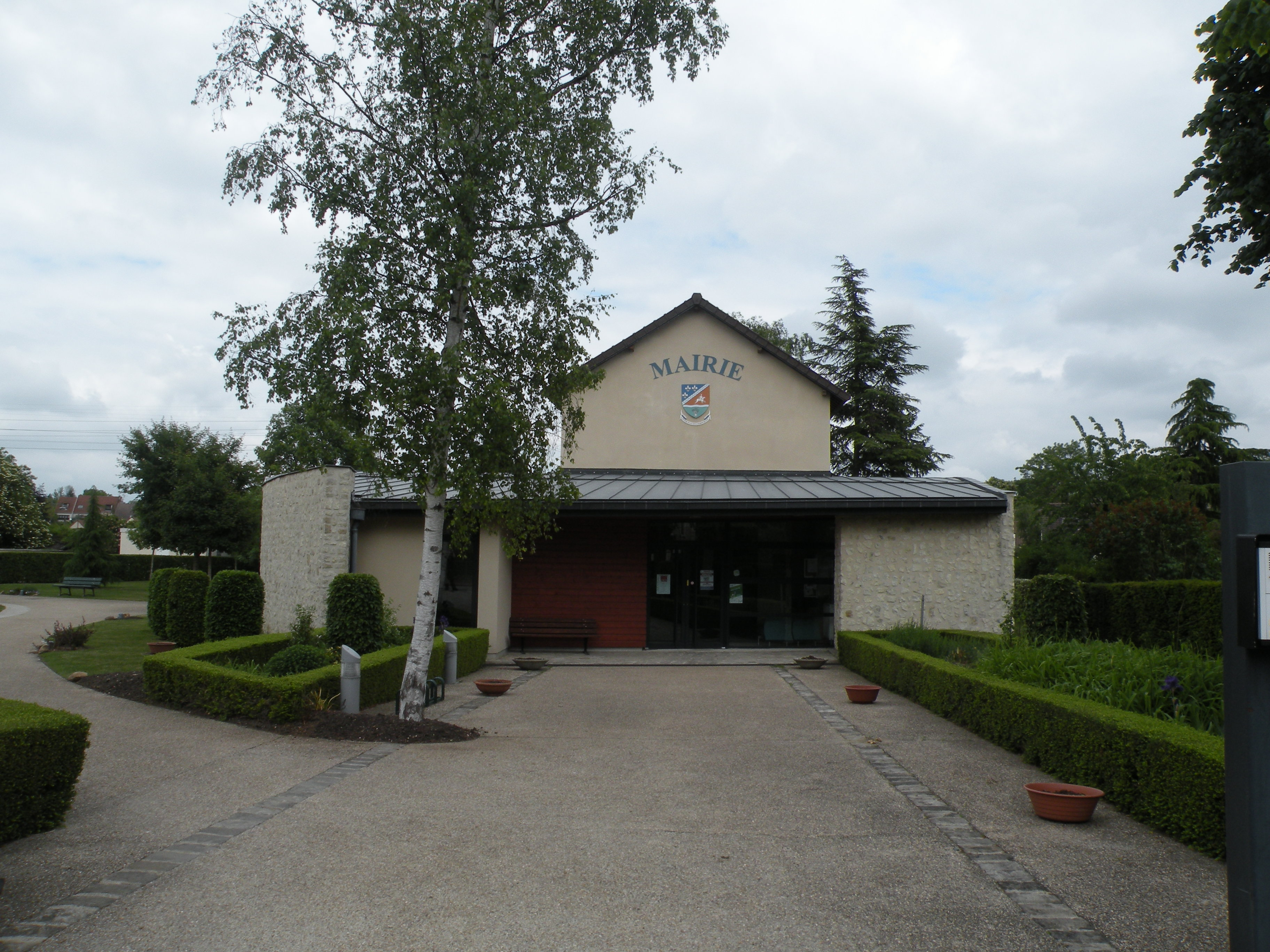
- The town hall of Mours

- Coat of arms
- Location of Mours
- Location within France Location within Île-de-France (region)
- Coordinates: 49°08′03″N 2°16′15″E
- Country: France
- Region: Île-de-France
- Department: Val-d'Oise
- Arrondissement: Pontoise
- Canton: L'Isle-Adam
- Intercommunality: Haut Val d'Oise

Government
  - Mayor (2024–2026): Olivier Lesueur
- Area^{1}: 2.45 km^{2} (0.95 sq mi)
- Highest elevation: 47 m (154 ft)
- Lowest elevation: 23 m (75 ft)
- Population (2023): 1,693
  - Density: 691/km^{2} (1,790/sq mi)
- Time zone: UTC+01:00 (CET)
  - Summer (DST): UTC+02:00 (CEST)
- INSEE/Postal code: 95436 /95260
- ^{1} French Land Register data, which excludes lakes, ponds, glaciers > 1 km^{2} (0.386 sq mi or 247 acres) and river estuaries.

Mours (French pronunciation: [muʁ]) is a commune in the Val-d'Oise department in Île-de-France in northern France.

== See also ==
- Communes of the Val-d'Oise department
