= Canton of L'Isle-Adam =

Administrative division of the Val-d'Oise department in Northern France

Coordinates: 49.11°N 2.22°E

The canton of L'Isle-Adam is an administrative division of the Val-d'Oise department, Île-de-France region, northern France. Its borders were modified at the French canton reorganisation which came into effect in March 2015. Its seat is in L'Isle-Adam.

It consists of the following communes:

1. Asnières-sur-Oise
2. Beaumont-sur-Oise
3. Bernes-sur-Oise
4. Bruyères-sur-Oise
5. Champagne-sur-Oise
6. L'Isle-Adam
7. Mours
8. Nerville-la-Forêt
9. Nointel
10. Noisy-sur-Oise
11. Parmain
12. Persan
13. Presles
14. Ronquerolles
15. Villiers-Adam
