= Villiers-Adam =

- Commune
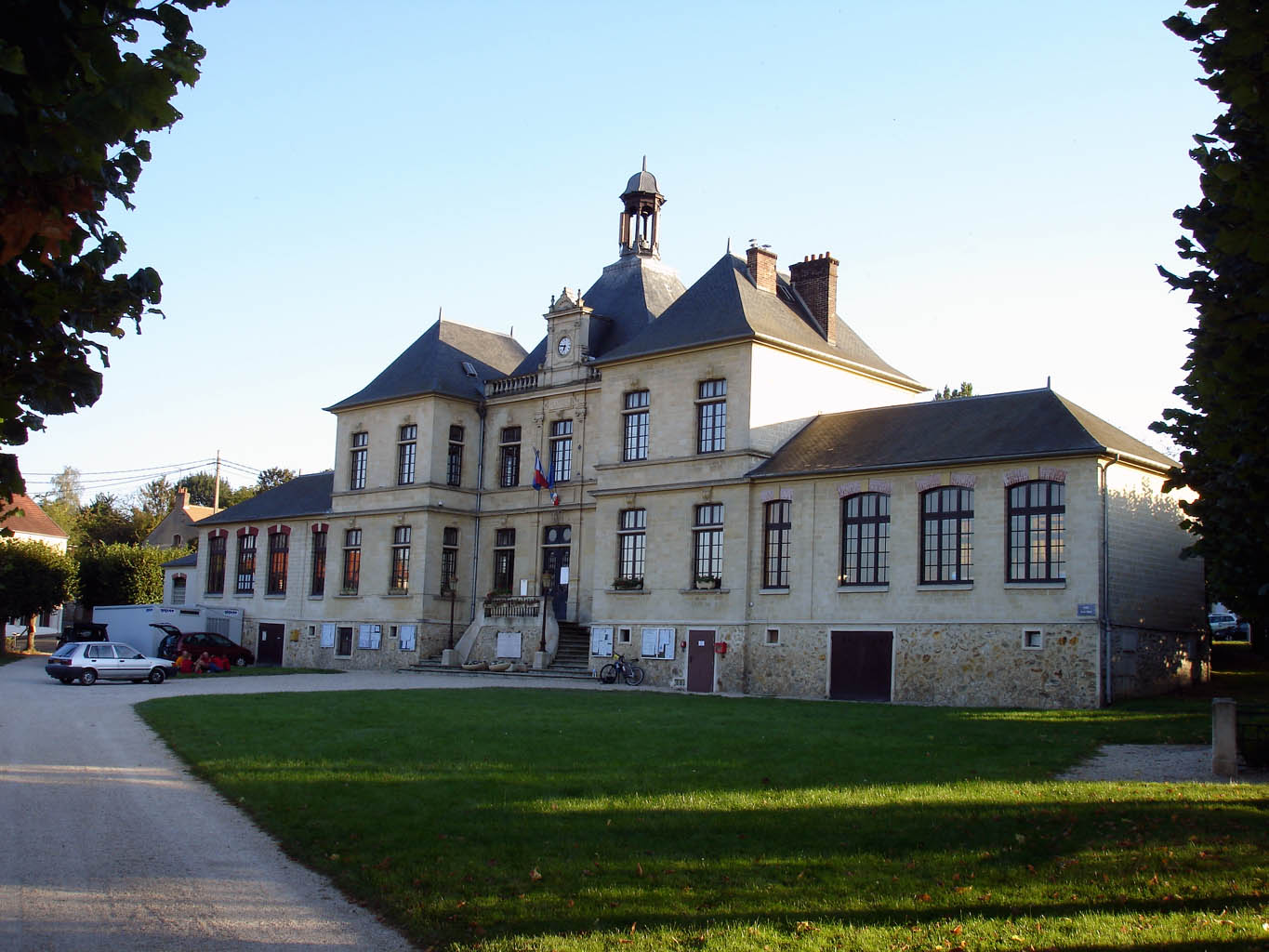
- Town hall

- Coat of arms
- Location of Villiers-Adam
- Location within France Location within Île-de-France (region)
- Coordinates: 49°03′55″N 2°14′10″E
- Country: France
- Region: Île-de-France
- Department: Val-d'Oise
- Arrondissement: Pontoise
- Canton: L'Isle-Adam
- Intercommunality: Vallée de l'Oise et des Trois Forêts

Government
  - Mayor (2020–2026): Bruno Macé
- Area^{1}: 9.82 km^{2} (3.79 sq mi)
- Highest elevation: 157 m (515 ft)
- Lowest elevation: 47 m (154 ft)
- Population (2023): 858
  - Density: 87.4/km^{2} (226/sq mi)
- Time zone: UTC+01:00 (CET)
  - Summer (DST): UTC+02:00 (CEST)
- INSEE/Postal code: 95678 /95840
- ^{1} French Land Register data, which excludes lakes, ponds, glaciers > 1 km^{2} (0.386 sq mi or 247 acres) and river estuaries.

Villiers-Adam (French pronunciation: [vilje adɑ̃]) is a commune in the Val-d'Oise department in Île-de-France in northern France.

== Geography ==
=== Climate ===
Villiers-Adam has an oceanic climate (Köppen climate classification Cfb). The average annual temperature in Villiers-Adam is 11.5 °C (52.7 °F). The average annual rainfall is 680.6 mm (26.80 in) with December as the wettest month. The temperatures are highest on average in August, at around 19.5 °C (67.1 °F), and lowest in January, at around 4.1 °C (39.4 °F). The highest temperature ever recorded in Villiers-Adam was 39.3 °C (102.7 °F) on 11 August 2003; the coldest temperature ever recorded was −14.2 °C (6.4 °F) on 1 January 1997.

Climate data for Villiers-Adam (1981−2010 normals, extremes 1988−2013)
Month	Jan	Feb	Mar	Apr	May	Jun	Jul	Aug	Sep	Oct	Nov	Dec	Year
Record high °C (°F)	15.4 (59.7)	19.8 (67.6)	22.7 (72.9)	27.1 (80.8)	32.9 (91.2)	36.1 (97.0)	37.3 (99.1)	39.3 (102.7)	31.3 (88.3)	28.6 (83.5)	19.7 (67.5)	16.7 (62.1)	39.3 (102.7)
Mean daily maximum °C (°F)	6.5 (43.7)	8.2 (46.8)	11.9 (53.4)	15.0 (59.0)	19.3 (66.7)	22.2 (72.0)	24.8 (76.6)	24.9 (76.8)	20.6 (69.1)	15.7 (60.3)	9.9 (49.8)	6.4 (43.5)	15.5 (59.9)
Daily mean °C (°F)	4.1 (39.4)	5.3 (41.5)	8.0 (46.4)	10.3 (50.5)	14.3 (57.7)	17.1 (62.8)	19.4 (66.9)	19.5 (67.1)	15.9 (60.6)	12.1 (53.8)	7.2 (45.0)	4.2 (39.6)	11.5 (52.7)
Mean daily minimum °C (°F)	1.7 (35.1)	2.3 (36.1)	4.2 (39.6)	5.7 (42.3)	9.4 (48.9)	11.9 (53.4)	14.0 (57.2)	14.0 (57.2)	11.3 (52.3)	8.5 (47.3)	4.5 (40.1)	2.0 (35.6)	7.5 (45.5)
Record low °C (°F)	−14.2 (6.4)	−11.3 (11.7)	−8.6 (16.5)	−2.8 (27.0)	0.4 (32.7)	2.0 (35.6)	7.4 (45.3)	7.2 (45.0)	3.4 (38.1)	−3.0 (26.6)	−8.2 (17.2)	−12.0 (10.4)	−14.2 (6.4)
Average precipitation mm (inches)	53.1 (2.09)	49.6 (1.95)	49.7 (1.96)	55.5 (2.19)	57.0 (2.24)	52.6 (2.07)	62.2 (2.45)	59.8 (2.35)	46.1 (1.81)	66.0 (2.60)	59.4 (2.34)	69.6 (2.74)	680.6 (26.80)
Average precipitation days (≥ 1.0 mm)	10.4	10.1	10.1	9.7	9.3	8.8	8.8	8.6	8.2	10.4	11.5	11.6	117.4
Source: Météo-France

== See also ==
- Communes of the Val-d'Oise department
