= Ronquerolles =

- Commune
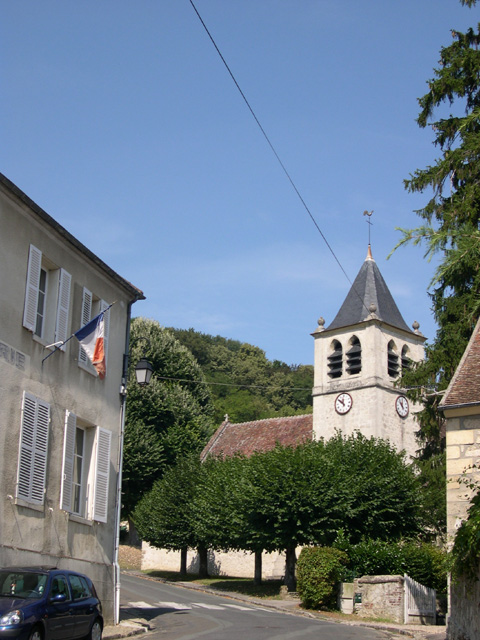
- Town hall and the church

- Coat of arms
- Location of Ronquerolles
- Location within France Location within Île-de-France (region)
- Coordinates: 49°10′03″N 2°13′31″E
- Country: France
- Region: Île-de-France
- Department: Val-d'Oise
- Arrondissement: Pontoise
- Canton: L'Isle-Adam
- Intercommunality: Haut Val-d'Oise

Government
  - Mayor (2024–2026): Patrick Prémel
- Area^{1}: 4.74 km^{2} (1.83 sq mi)
- Highest elevation: 188 m (617 ft)
- Lowest elevation: 44 m (144 ft)
- Population (2023): 907
  - Density: 191/km^{2} (496/sq mi)
- Time zone: UTC+01:00 (CET)
  - Summer (DST): UTC+02:00 (CEST)
- INSEE/Postal code: 95529 /95340
- ^{1} French Land Register data, which excludes lakes, ponds, glaciers > 1 km^{2} (0.386 sq mi or 247 acres) and river estuaries.

Ronquerolles (French pronunciation: [ʁɔ̃kʁɔl]) is a commune in the Val-d'Oise department and Île-de-France region of France.

== See also ==
- Communes of the Val-d'Oise department
