= Viarmes =

- Commune
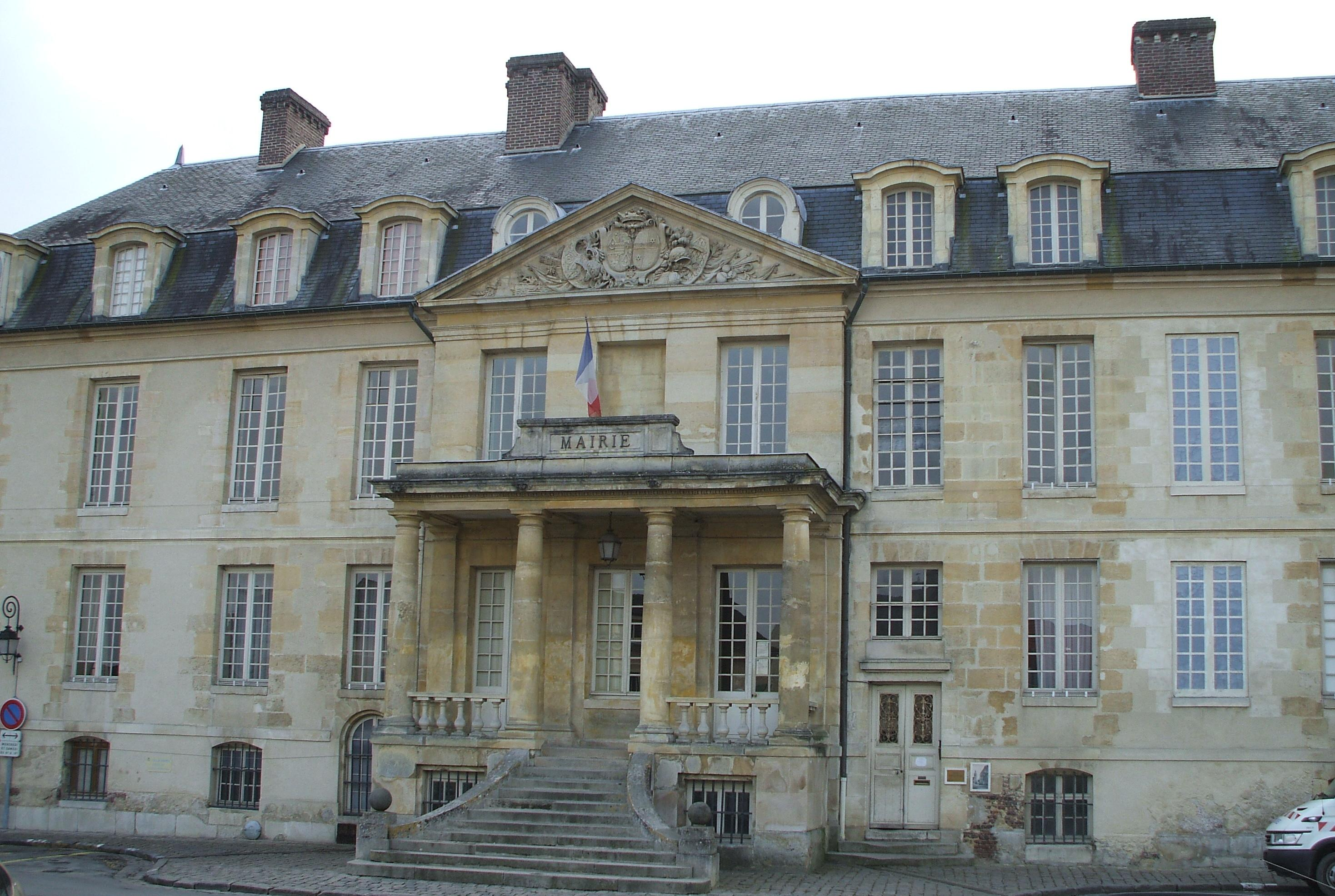
- Town hall in the château de Viarmes

- Coat of arms
- Location of Viarmes
- Location within France Location within Île-de-France (region)
- Coordinates: 49°07′43″N 2°22′16″E
- Country: France
- Region: Île-de-France
- Department: Val-d'Oise
- Arrondissement: Sarcelles
- Canton: Fosses
- Intercommunality: Carnelle Pays de France

Government
  - Mayor (2020–2026): Olivier Dupont
- Area^{1}: 8.19 km^{2} (3.16 sq mi)
- Highest elevation: 154 m (505 ft)
- Lowest elevation: 28 m (92 ft)
- Population (2023): 5,558
  - Density: 679/km^{2} (1,760/sq mi)
- Time zone: UTC+01:00 (CET)
  - Summer (DST): UTC+02:00 (CEST)
- INSEE/Postal code: 95652 /95270
- Website: viarmes.fr
- ^{1} French Land Register data, which excludes lakes, ponds, glaciers > 1 km^{2} (0.386 sq mi or 247 acres) and river estuaries.

Viarmes (French pronunciation: [vjaʁm]) is a commune in the Val-d'Oise department in Île-de-France in northern France. Viarmes station has rail connections to Luzarches, Sarcelles and Paris.

== History ==
During the Middle Ages, Viarmes was a lordship (seigneur de Viarmes) held by Pierre the Fat and Pierre the Younger, both chamberlains of King Philip IV of France.

== Population ==
Historical population
Year	Pop.	±% p.a.
1968	2,625	—
1975	3,303	+3.34%
1982	3,871	+2.29%
1990	4,315	+1.37%
1999	4,681	+0.91%
2007	4,767	+0.23%
2012	5,230	+1.87%
2017	5,175	−0.21%
2023	5,558	+1.20%
Source: INSEE

== Twin towns ==
Viarmes is currently twinned with Tubbercurry in County Sligo, Ireland. Viarmes is also twinned with Morcote, an Italian-speaking town in Switzerland.

== See also ==
- Communes of the Val-d'Oise department
