= Asnières-sur-Oise =

- Commune
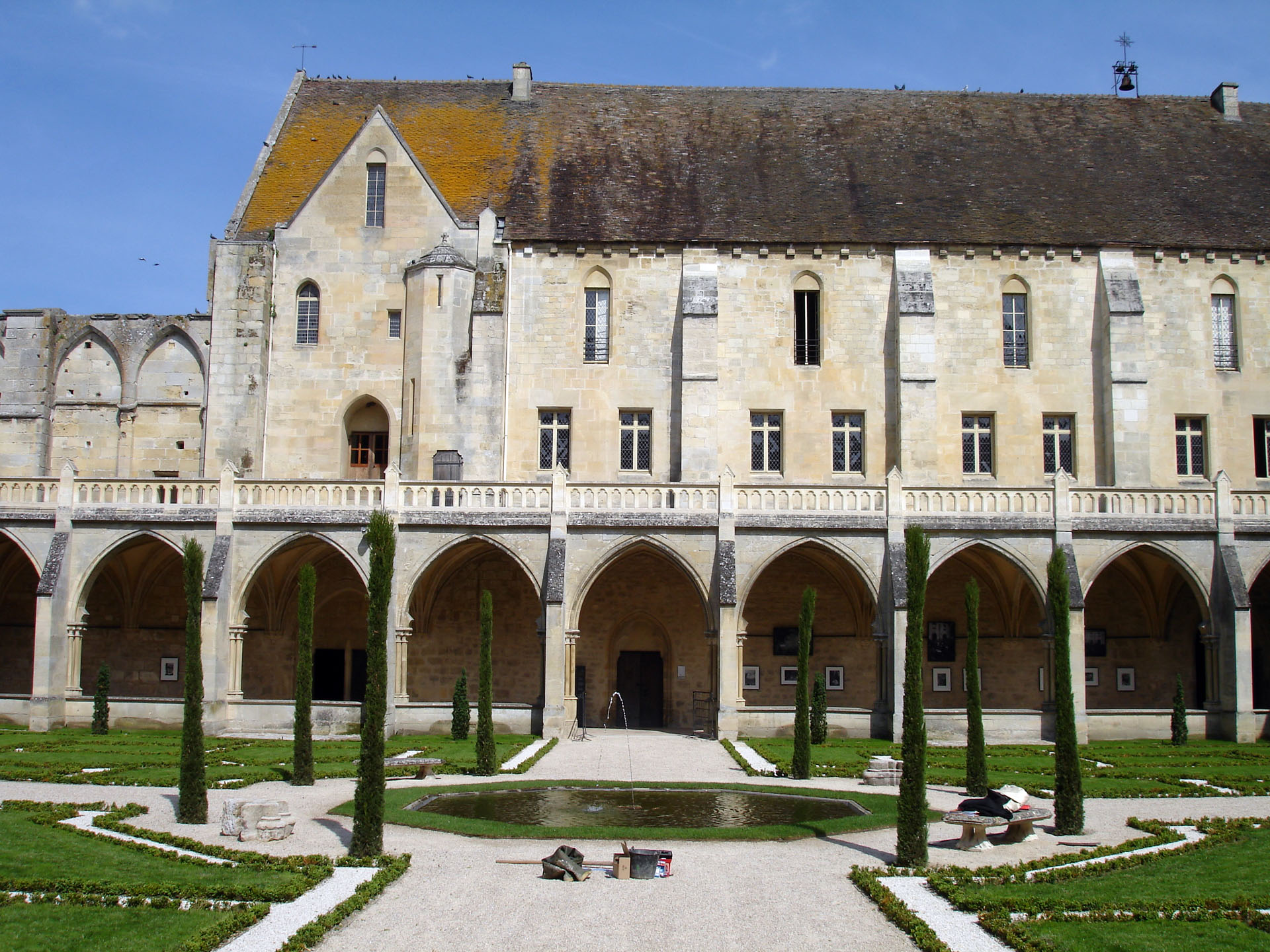
- Royaumont Abbey, the cloister and the monks' building

- Coat of arms
- Location of Asnières-sur-Oise
- Location within France Location within Île-de-France (region)
- Coordinates: 49°08′03″N 2°21′24″E
- Country: France
- Region: Île-de-France
- Department: Val-d'Oise
- Arrondissement: Sarcelles
- Canton: L'Isle-Adam
- Intercommunality: CC Carnelle - Pays France

Government
  - Mayor (2023–2026): Eric Therry
- Area^{1}: 14.07 km^{2} (5.43 sq mi)
- Population (2023): 3,127
  - Density: 222.2/km^{2} (575.6/sq mi)
- Time zone: UTC+01:00 (CET)
  - Summer (DST): UTC+02:00 (CEST)
- INSEE/Postal code: 95026 /95270
- ^{1} French Land Register data, which excludes lakes, ponds, glaciers > 1 km^{2} (0.386 sq mi or 247 acres) and river estuaries.

Asnières-sur-Oise (French pronunciation: [ɑnjɛʁ syʁ waz]; lit. 'Asnières-on-Oise') is a commune in the Val-d'Oise department in Île-de-France in northern France. The 13th–18th century Royaumont Abbey is located in the commune.

== Population ==
Population of Asnières-sur-Oise (95270):

Historical population

Year	Pop.	±% p.a.
1793	932	—
1800	1,029	+1.42%
1806	1,149	+1.86%
1821	1,106	−0.25%
1831	1,106	+0.00%
1836	1,151	+0.80%
1841	1,051	−1.80%
1846	1,086	+0.66%
1851	909	−3.50%
1856	978	+1.47%
1861	875	−2.20%
1866	952	+1.70%
1872	1,019	+1.14%
1876	1,100	+1.93%
1881	1,055	−0.83%
1886	1,089	+0.64%
1891	1,170	+1.45%
1896	1,261	+1.51%
1901	1,294	+0.52%

Year	Pop.	±% p.a.
1906	1,224	−1.11%
1911	1,172	−0.86%
1921	1,064	−0.96%
1926	1,140	+1.39%
1931	1,149	+0.16%
1936	1,116	−0.58%
1946	1,007	−1.02%
1954	1,255	+2.79%
1962	1,399	+1.37%
1968	1,462	+0.74%
1975	1,450	−0.12%
1982	2,186	+6.04%
1990	2,321	+0.75%
1999	2,479	+0.73%
2007	2,541	+0.31%
2012	2,544	+0.02%
2017	2,650	+0.82%
2023	3,127	+2.80%

Source: EHESS and INSEE (1968–2023)

== Twin towns ==
- Cutigliano, Italy

== See also ==
- Communes of the Val-d'Oise department
