= Zéro de conduite (band) =

French punk rock group from Issoudun

- Origin: France
- Genre: Punk rock
- Years active: 1981–1988
- Past members: Johan Ledoux; Guillaume Ledoux; Anne-Sophie Bolender; Franck Leblanc; Magane

Zéro de conduite is a French punk rock group from Issoudun, in the Indre department. Its members were still children when it was formed in the 1980s.

== Biography ==
The brothers Johan Ledoux (born in 1972) and Guillaume Ledoux (born in 1970), Anne-Sophie Bolender (born in 1970), a cousin of the two brothers who handled vocals, and Franck Leblanc (born in 1970), a friend, formed Zéro de conduite in 1981. They played some concerts and were quickly noticed by Bernard Batzen, an agent and artistic director, who encouraged them to participate in the Printemps de Bourges music festival in 1983. They were then between 11 and 13 years old. They opened for The Gun Club and The Clash, went on a tour in Canada, and participated in the inaugural concert at the Zénith de Paris in 1984 (and thus played in front of the then-President of France, François Mitterrand).

Their discography includes five singles (including Je suis mort, their biggest hit, and a cover of France Gall's Sucettes) and one self-titled album Zéro de conduite released in 1988.

Franck Leblanc died in a car accident at the age of 18 in 1988, and the group disbanded the same year. The Ledoux brothers then formed a new band, Blankass, in 1991.

== Members ==
- Guillaume Ledoux – drums
- Johan Ledoux – guitar
- Anne-Sophie Bolender – voice
- Franck Leblanc – bass
- Magane – bass
