= Nointel–Mours station =

French railway station

Nointel–Mours
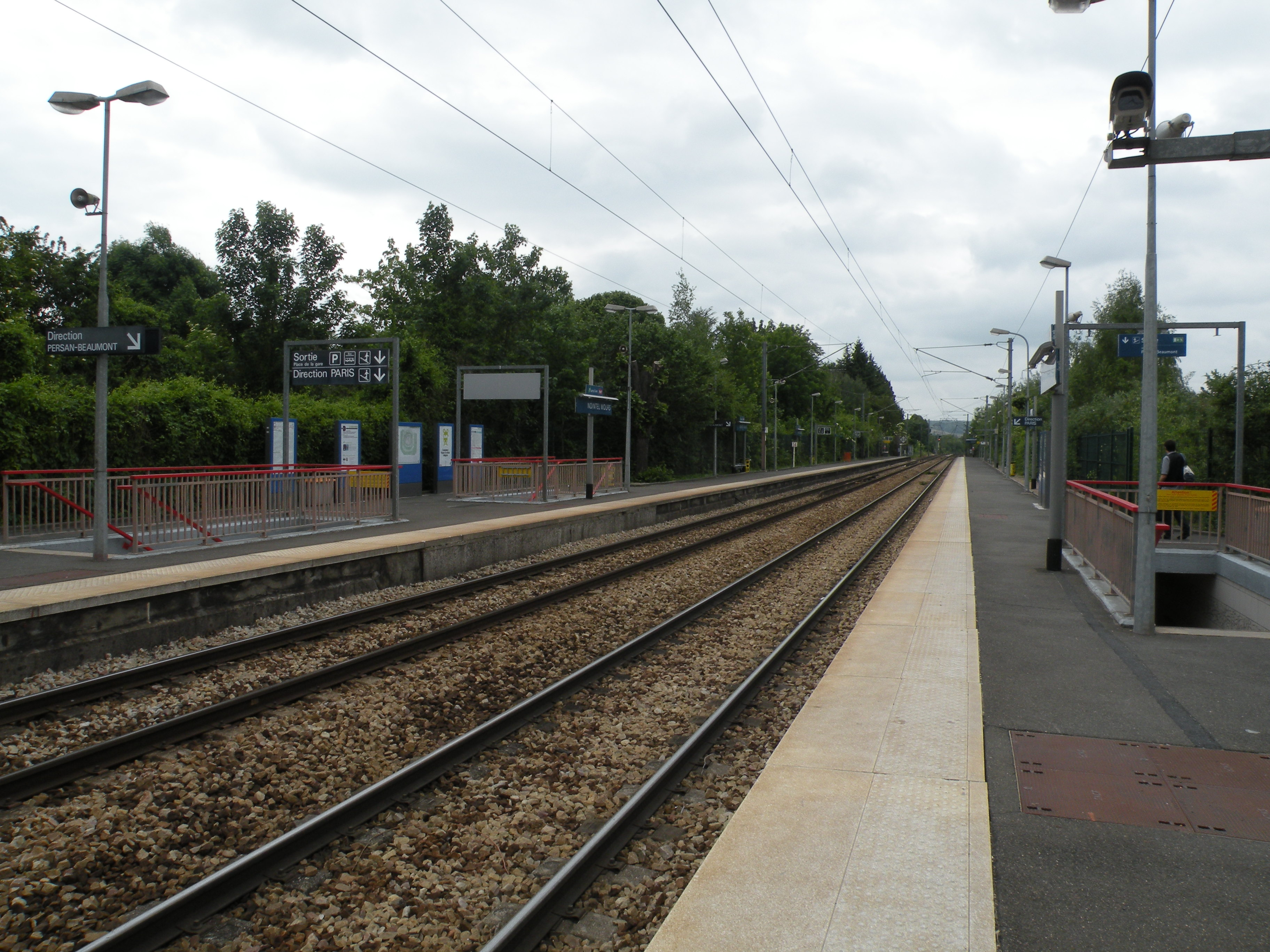
- Platforms

General information
- Location: Nointel, France
- Coordinates: 49°7′57″N 2°16′50″E
- Owner: SNCF
- Line: Épinay-Villetaneuse–Le Tréport-Mers railway
- Platforms: 2

Other information
- Station code: 87276758
- Fare zone: 5

History
- Opened: 1877

Services
Preceding station	Transilien	Following station
Presles–Courcelles towards Paris-Nord	Line H	Persan–Beaumont Terminus
Location

Nointel–Mours is a railway station in Nointel (Val-d'Oise department), France. It is on the Épinay-Villetaneuse–Le Tréport-Mers railway, between Épinay-Villetaneuse and Persan-Beaumont. The station is used by Transilien line H trains from Paris to Persan-Beaumont. The daily number of passengers was between 500 and 2,500 in 2002. The station was opened in 1877, along with the Épinay-Villetaneuse – Montsoult-Maffliers – Persan-Beaumont section of the Épinay-Le Tréport Line. It was first exploited by the Compagnie des chemins de fer du Nord.

== Bus connections ==
- Haut Val-d'Oise : Haut Val-d'Oise: 1302
