= Nerville-la-Forêt =

- Commune
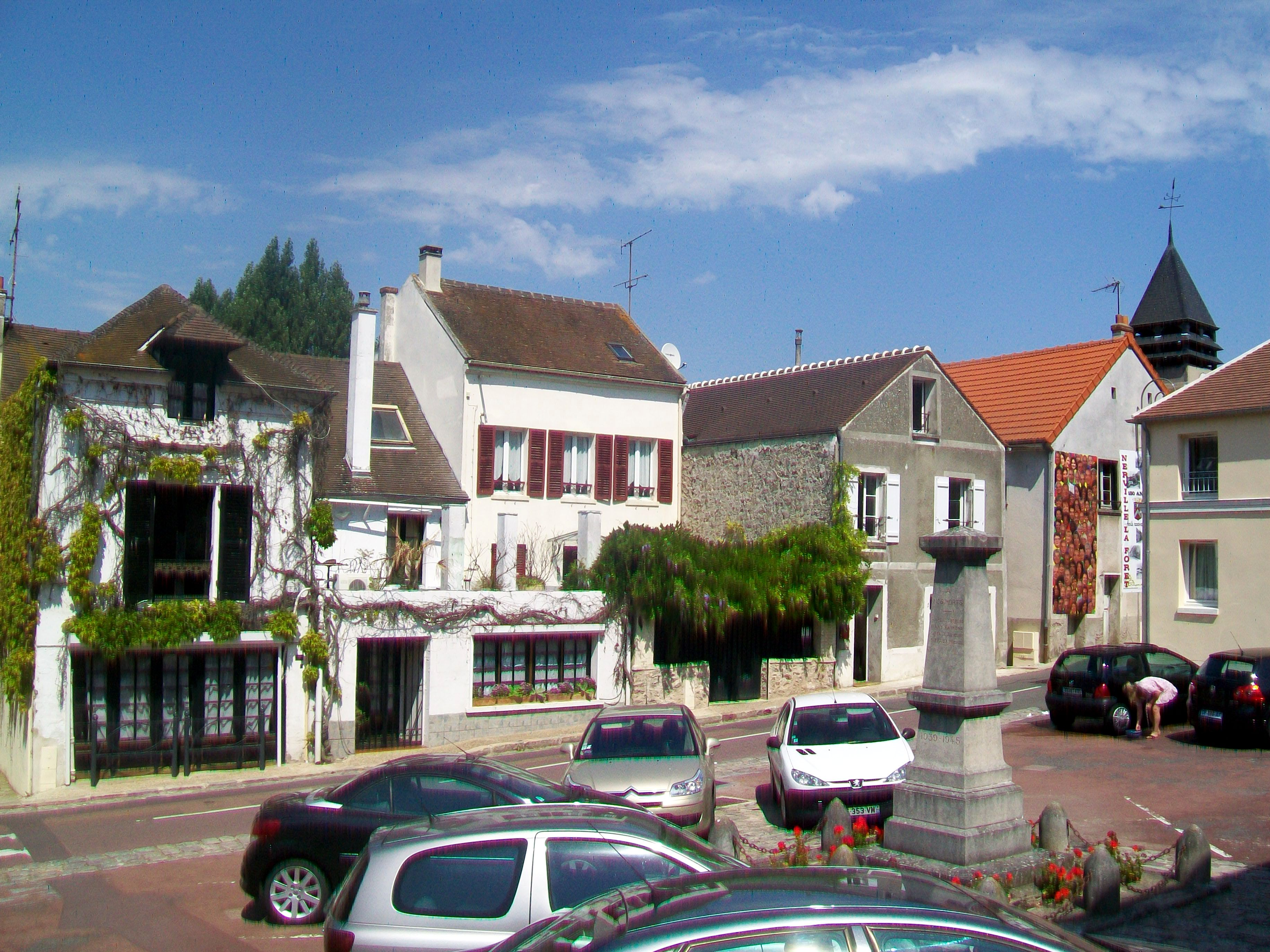
- The village square and Rue Saint-Claude, in Nerville-la-Forêt

- Coat of arms
- Location of Nerville-la-Forêt
- Location within France Location within Île-de-France (region)
- Coordinates: 49°05′26″N 2°16′47″E
- Country: France
- Region: Île-de-France
- Department: Val-d'Oise
- Arrondissement: Pontoise
- Canton: L'Isle-Adam
- Intercommunality: Vallée de l'Oise et des Trois Forêts

Government
  - Mayor (2020–2026): Philippe Van Hyfte
- Area^{1}: 6.68 km^{2} (2.58 sq mi)
- Highest elevation: 194 m (636 ft)
- Lowest elevation: 65 m (213 ft)
- Population (2023): 756
  - Density: 113/km^{2} (293/sq mi)
- Time zone: UTC+01:00 (CET)
  - Summer (DST): UTC+02:00 (CEST)
- INSEE/Postal code: 95445 /95590
- ^{1} French Land Register data, which excludes lakes, ponds, glaciers > 1 km^{2} (0.386 sq mi or 247 acres) and river estuaries.

Nerville-la-Forêt (French pronunciation: [nɛʁvil la fɔʁɛ]) is a commune in the Val-d'Oise department in Île-de-France in northern France.

== See also ==
- Communes of the Val-d'Oise department
