= Noisy-sur-Oise =

- Commune
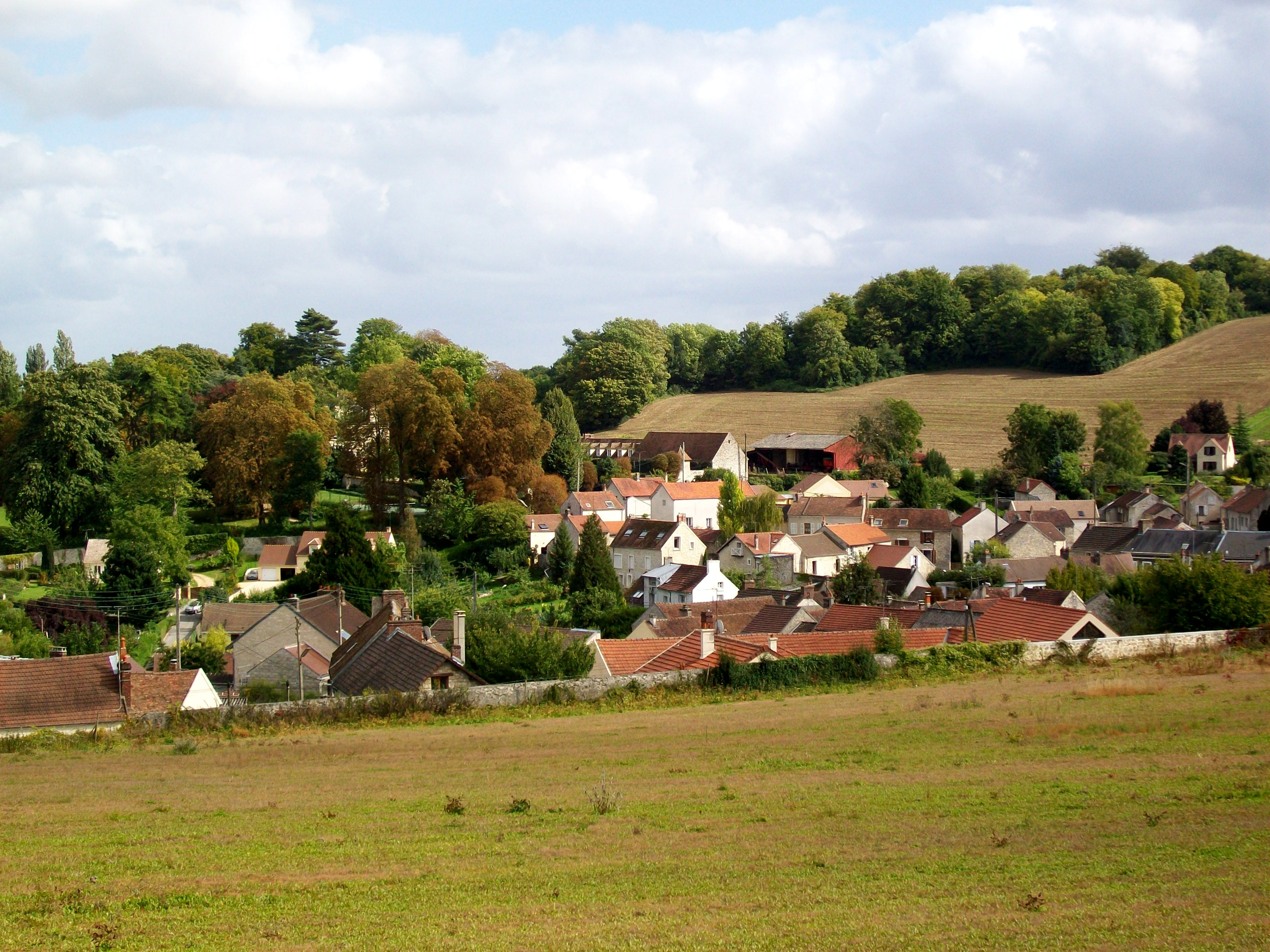
- The centre of the village, seen from Rue Pasteur
- Location of Noisy-sur-Oise
- Location within France Location within Île-de-France (region)
- Coordinates: 49°08′19″N 2°19′50″E
- Country: France
- Region: Île-de-France
- Department: Val-d'Oise
- Arrondissement: Pontoise
- Canton: L'Isle-Adam

Government
  - Mayor (2020–2026): Catherine Borgne
- Area^{1}: 3.79 km^{2} (1.46 sq mi)
- Population (2023): 549
  - Density: 145/km^{2} (375/sq mi)
- Time zone: UTC+01:00 (CET)
  - Summer (DST): UTC+02:00 (CEST)
- INSEE/Postal code: 95456 /95270
- ^{1} French Land Register data, which excludes lakes, ponds, glaciers > 1 km^{2} (0.386 sq mi or 247 acres) and river estuaries.

Noisy-sur-Oise (French pronunciation: [nwazi syʁ waz], literally Noisy on Oise) is a commune in the Val-d'Oise department and Île-de-France region of France.

== See also ==
- Communes of the Val-d'Oise department
