= Viarmes station =

Railway station in Viarmes, France

Coordinates: 49°7′1″N 2°22′6″E

Viarmes
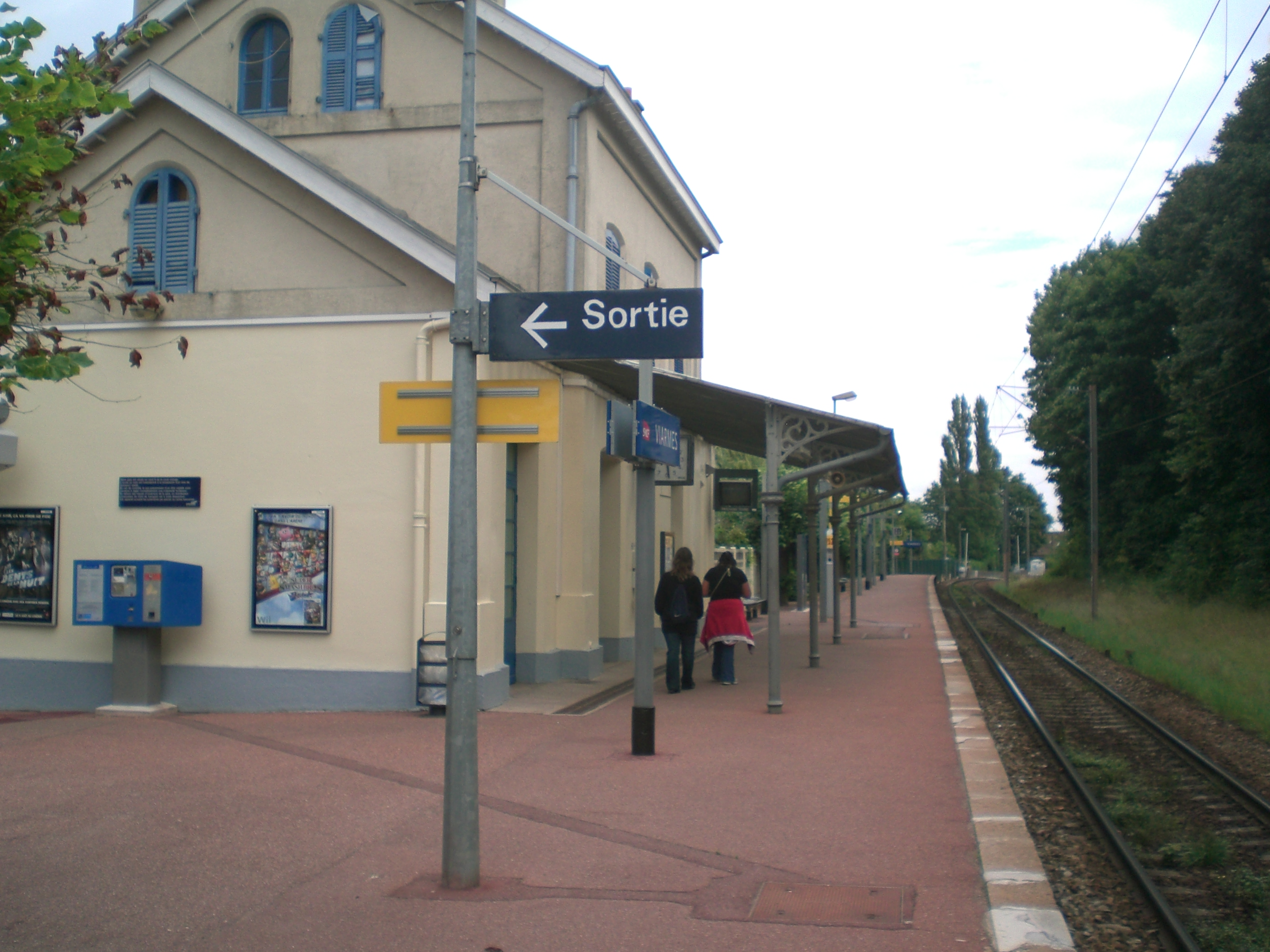

General information
- Location: Viarmes, France
- Owner: SNCF
- Line: Transilien H
- Platforms: 1

Construction
- Parking: 500

Other information
- Station code: 87276568
- Fare zone: 5

History
- Opened: 1 May 1880

Services
Preceding station	Transilien	Following station
Belloy–Saint-Martin towards Paris-Nord	Line H	Seugy towards Luzarches
Location

Viarmes is a railway station in Viarmes (Val d'Oise department), France. The station is served by the Transilien H trains from Paris to Luzarches. In 2002 fewer than 500 passengers per day joined a train here.

== Bus routes ==
- CIF: 14 and 141
