= Cédric Herrou =

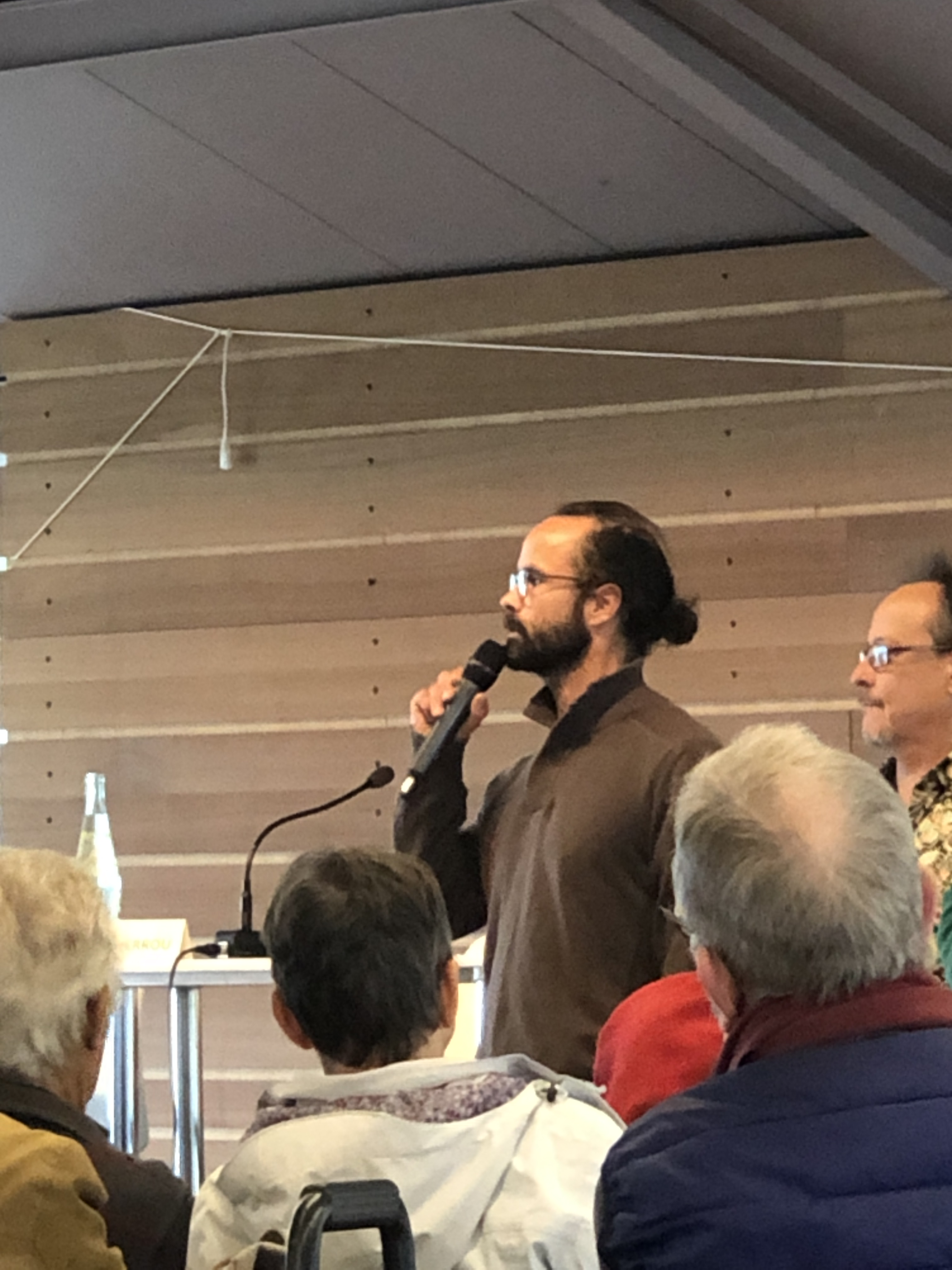
Cédric Herrou

Cédric Herrou is a French olive farmer and immigration activist. He became known in France and internationally following his arrests for helping more than 250 migrants cross into France from Italy. Herrou's efforts have been described in the media as the "French Underground railroad". After numerous convictions for assisting migrants to cross the border, Herrou's actions were found to be legal by the French Constitutional Council, which found Herrou's actions to be covered under the constitutional exercise of fraternity to others.

== Life ==
Herrou was born in 1979 in Nice, France and is an olive farmer in the area of Breil-sur-Roya.

In 2015, Herrou began regularly crossing the French-Italian border near his farm to offer assistance to refugees wishing to enter France. He has been arrested several times for doing this.

== Arrests and prosecution ==
In August 2016, Herrou was arrested while transporting eight migrants in his van across the Italian-French border. After concluding that Herrou's intent was humanitarian, the French prosecutor in Nice declined to press charges.

On October 20, 2016, Herrou was arrested after he and three other activists occupied the former SNCF railway station Saint-Dalmas-de-Tende, near Tende, France. Herrou was assisting fifty migrants, principally from Eritrea and the Sudan, to cross into France from the Italian city of Ventimiglia and housing them at the disused railway station. The prosecutor, who called Herrou's actions "noble", requested an eight-month suspended sentence. The actual sentence is expected to be handed down by the court on February 10, 2017.

On January 18, 2017 Herrou was taken into custody by local police, with his brother and one other person, for assisting three Eritrean migrants in crossing the border into France. They were released on January 20 without charges being filed.

On 10 February 2017, a trial court in Nice convicted Herrou for aiding illegal arrivals and of fined him €3,000.

On July 6, 2018, the French Constitutional Council ruled that Herrou's actions to help migrants were legal, since the principle of fraternity in the French constitution specifically "confers the freedom to help others, for humanitarian purposes, regardless of the legality of their presence on national territory."

On May 13, 2020, the Appeals Court of Lyon voided all charges against Herrou. On March 31, 2021, the Appeal in Cassation of the General Prosecutor's Office of Lyon is rejected by the Court of Cassation makes the activist's relaxation final.

== Public reaction ==
Herrou's actions raised the interest of the French public. Arriving for his trial in January 2017 in Nice, he was met by the applause of hundreds of members of the public who supported his actions as well as some who did not. That same month, an editorial addressing Herrou as well as the issues raised by his actions was published by the editorial board of The New York Times.

== See also ==
- Crime of solidarity
