= Ponthoile =

- Commune
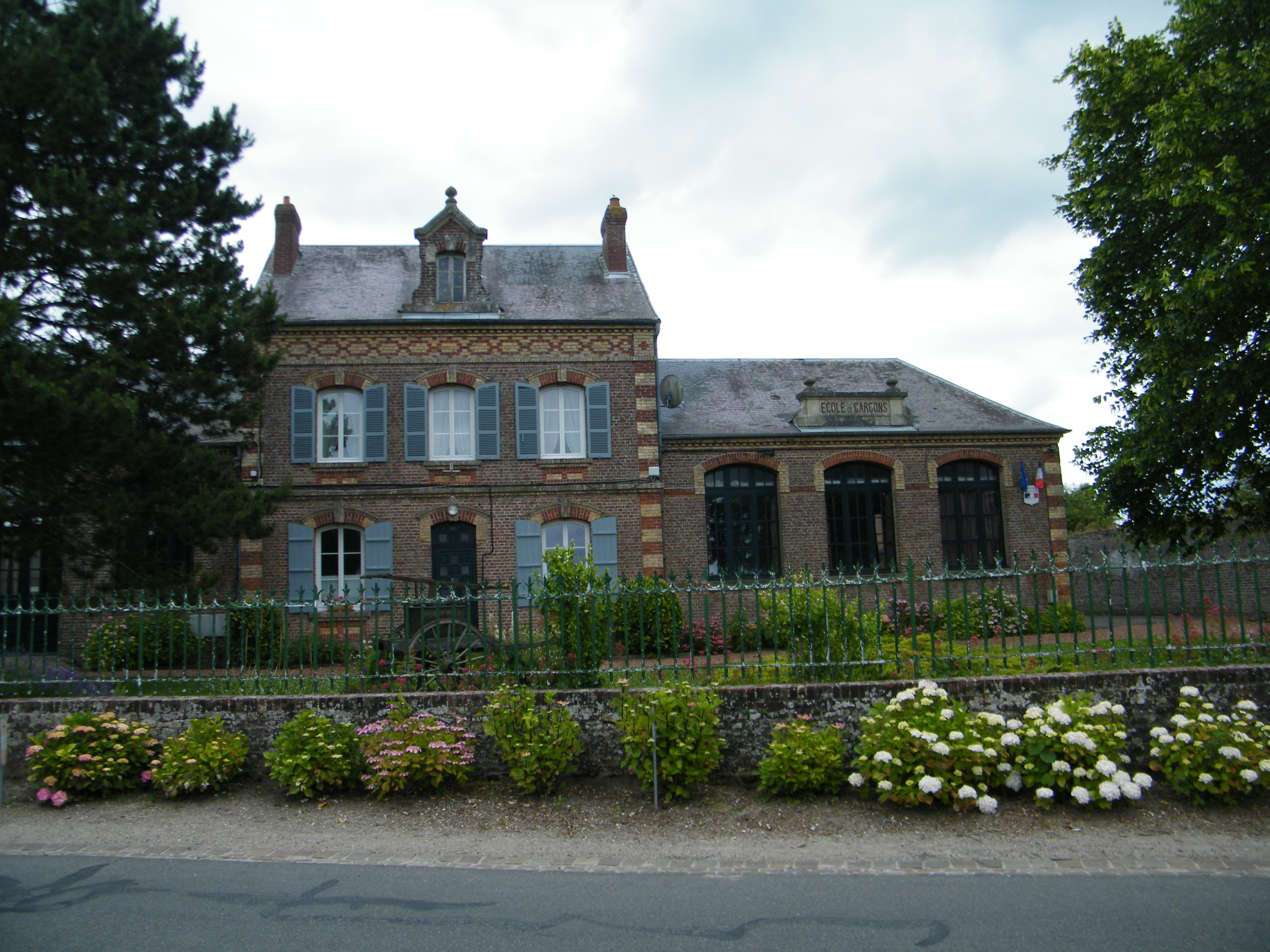
- The town hall and school in Ponthoile

- Coat of arms
- Location of Ponthoile
- Location within France Location within Hauts-de-France
- Coordinates: 50°12′59″N 1°42′48″E
- Country: France
- Region: Hauts-de-France
- Department: Somme
- Arrondissement: Abbeville
- Canton: Abbeville-1
- Intercommunality: CC Ponthieu-Marquenterre

Government
  - Mayor (2026–32): Thierry Bizet
- Area^{1}: 19.41 km^{2} (7.49 sq mi)
- Elevation: 6 m (20 ft)
- Highest elevation: 31 m (102 ft)
- Lowest elevation: 2 m (6.6 ft)
- Population (2023): 563
  - Density: 29.0/km^{2} (75.1/sq mi)
- Time zone: UTC+01:00 (CET)
  - Summer (DST): UTC+02:00 (CEST)
- INSEE/Postal code: 80633 /80860
- ^{1} French Land Register data, which excludes lakes, ponds, glaciers > 1 km^{2} (0.386 sq mi or 247 acres) and river estuaries.

Ponthoile (French pronunciation: [pɔ̃twal]) is a commune in the Somme department of Hauts-de-France in northern France.

== Geography ==
Ponthoile is situated on the D235 road, some 15 km northwest of Abbeville, near the bay of the Somme.

== History ==
In 1346, during the Hundred Years War, English troops burnt and pillaged the towns of the Ponthieu on their way to the Battle of Crécy. Ponthoile was attacked on Saint-Barthélémy's day, 24 August, just two days before the battle, burning down the 12th-century church.

In the 13th century, there were 180 homes in Ponthoile, according to Dom Grenier. After the ravages of the wars against the English and Burgundians, according to English statistics, there were only 48. The population of Ponthoile subsequently increase slowly into the middle of the 19th century, before declining again, as farming became mechanisied and people left for the big cities

== Demography ==
Historical population

Year	Pop.	±% p.a.
1698	300	—
1772	399	+0.39%
1793	581	+1.81%
1831	727	+0.59%
1836	781	+1.44%
1851	878	+0.78%
1861	876	−0.02%
1901	851	−0.07%
1921	715	−0.87%
1946	661	−0.31%

Year	Pop.	±% p.a.
1962	629	−0.31%
1968	599	−0.81%
1975	537	−1.55%
1982	509	−0.76%
1990	502	−0.17%
1999	547	+0.96%
2007	603	+1.23%
2012	618	+0.49%
2017	615	−0.10%
2023	563	−1.46%

Source: EHESS (1793-1999) and INSEE (1968-2023)

== Main sights ==
- Memorial to the aviation pioneers, the brothers Caudron.
- Church of Saint Pierre. Badly damaged by two fires, it was decided, in 1836, to build a bigger, better church in brick and slate.
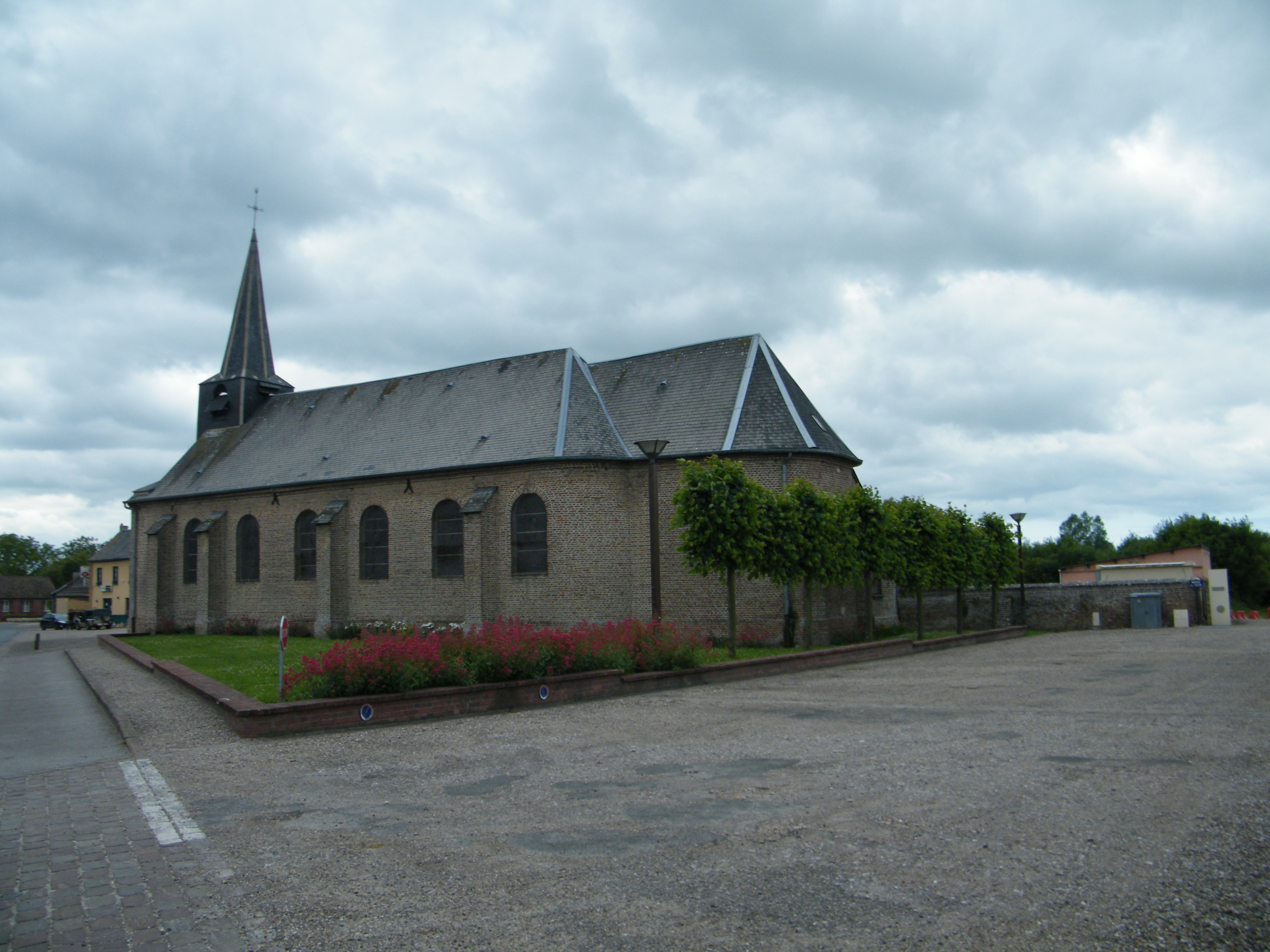
Saint-Pierre Church.

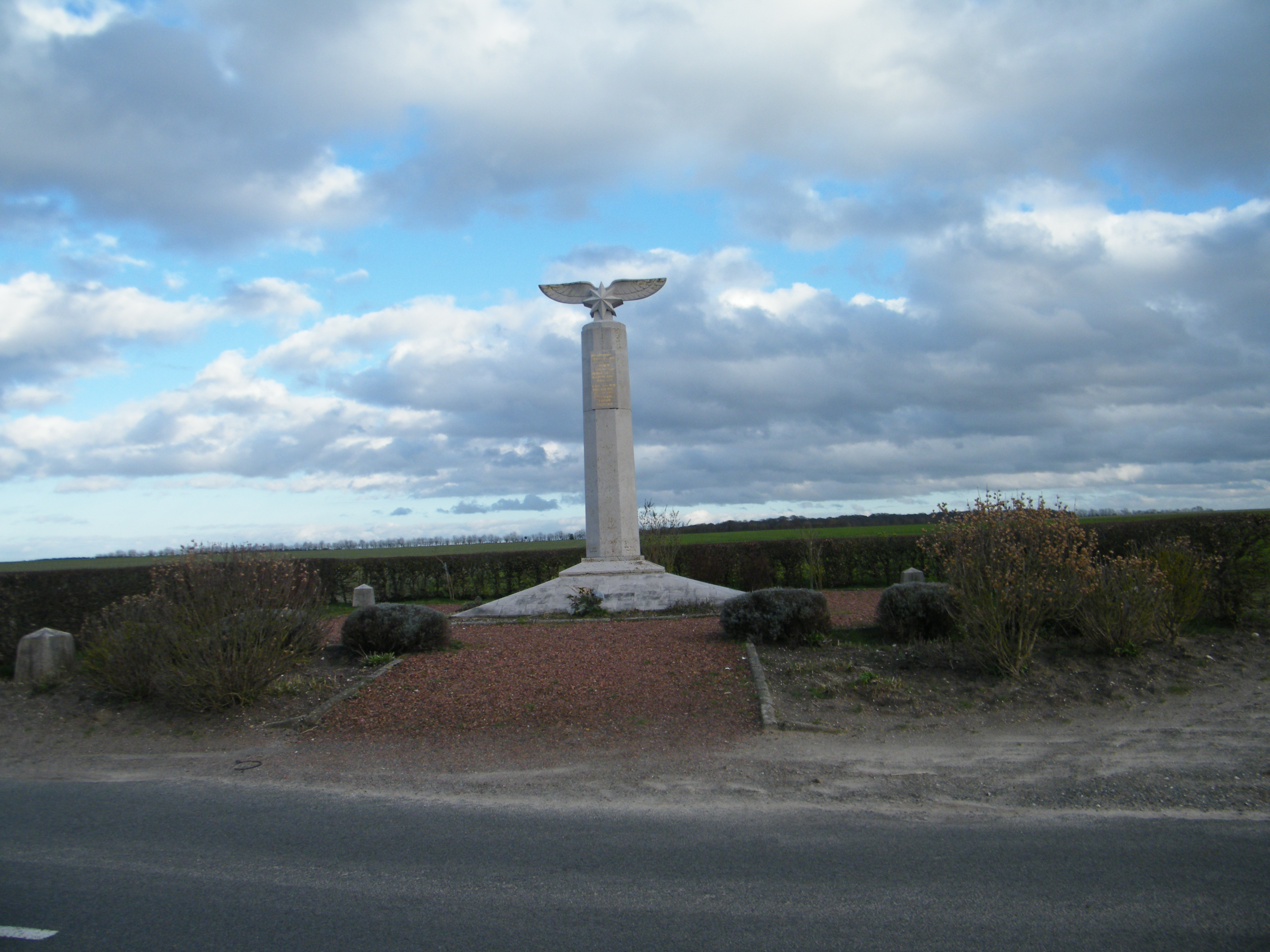
Caudron's Memorial.

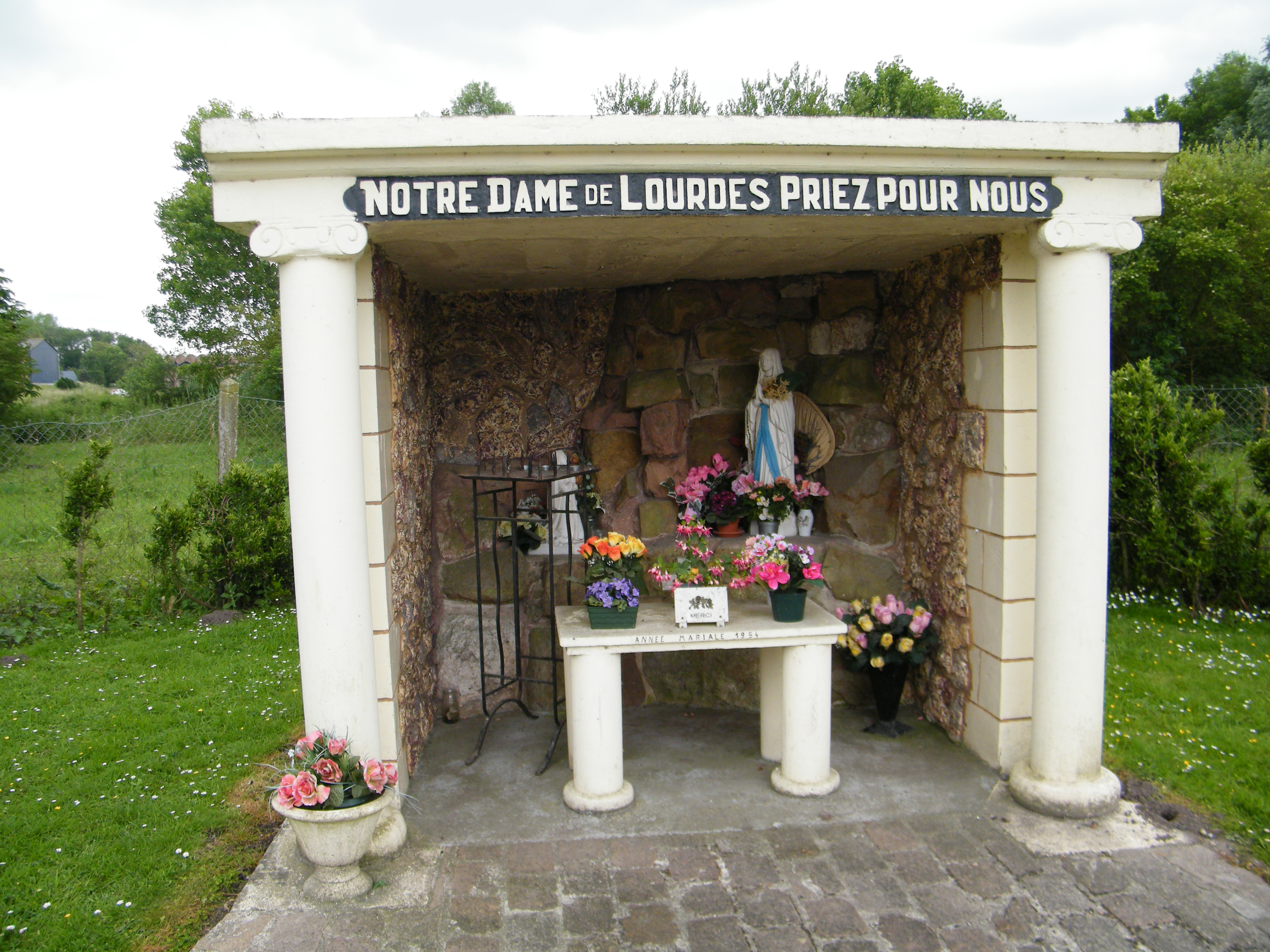
Lourdes Grotto.

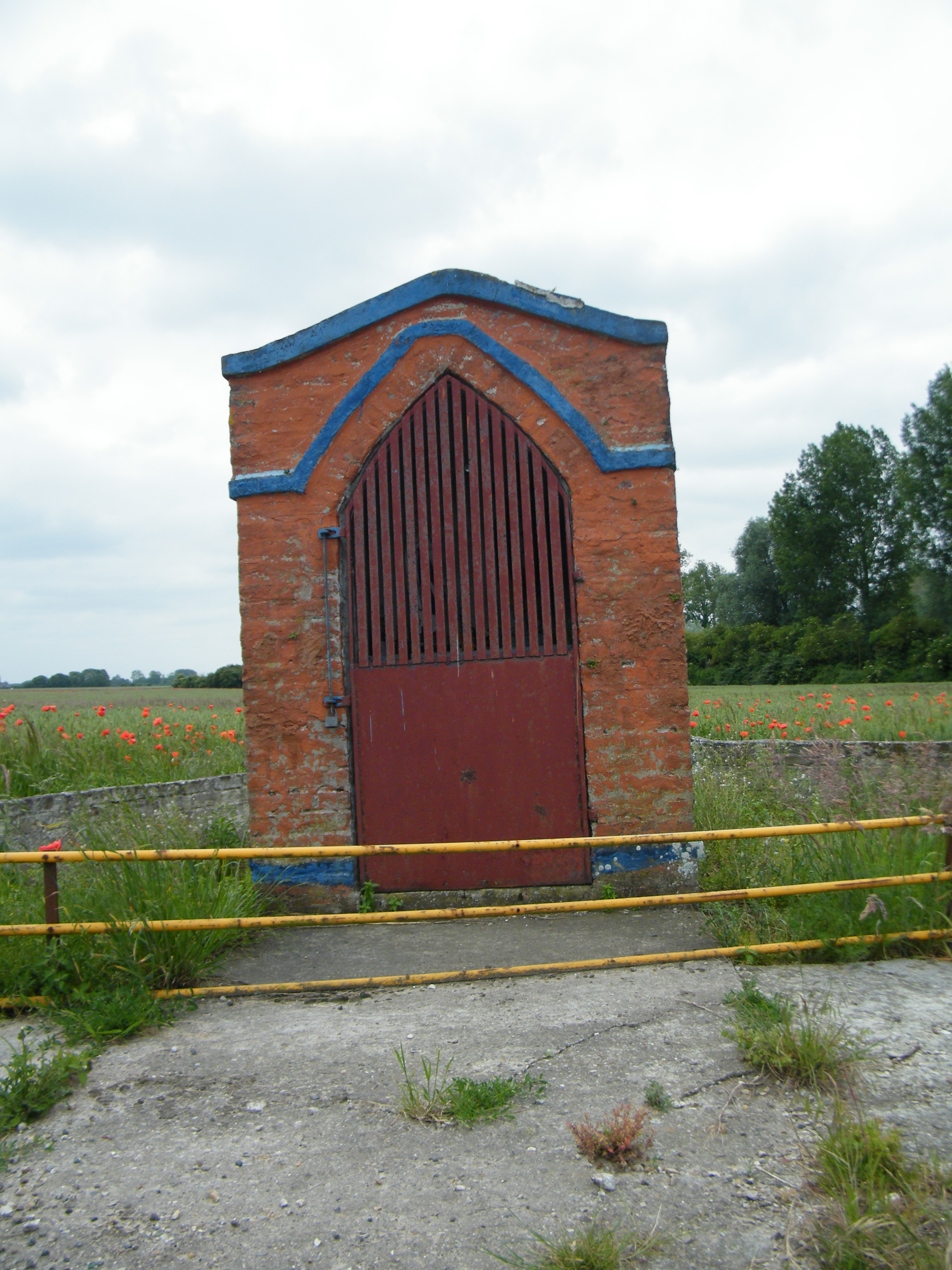
Chapel Fromentin, Romaine.

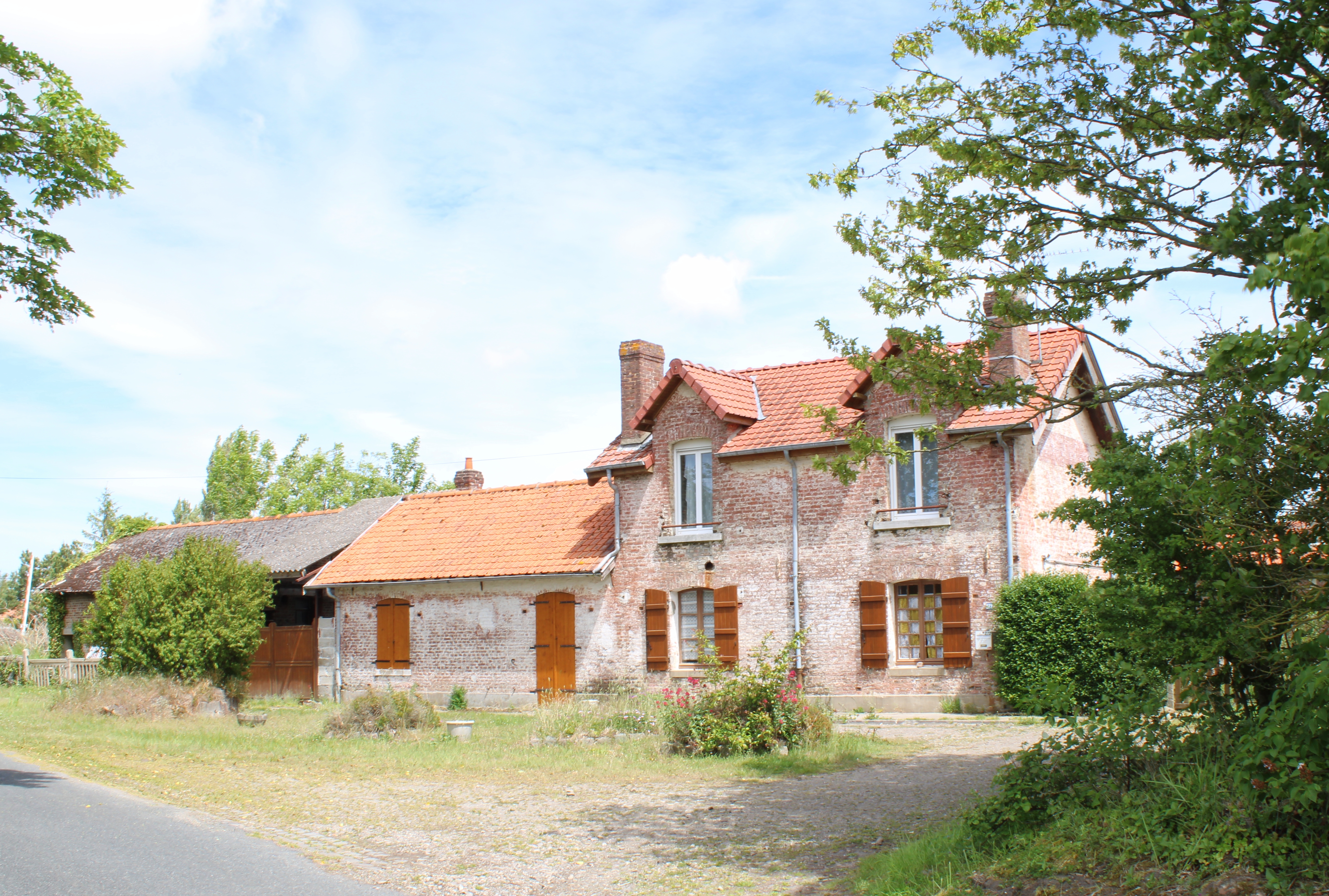
Former railway station in Romaine.

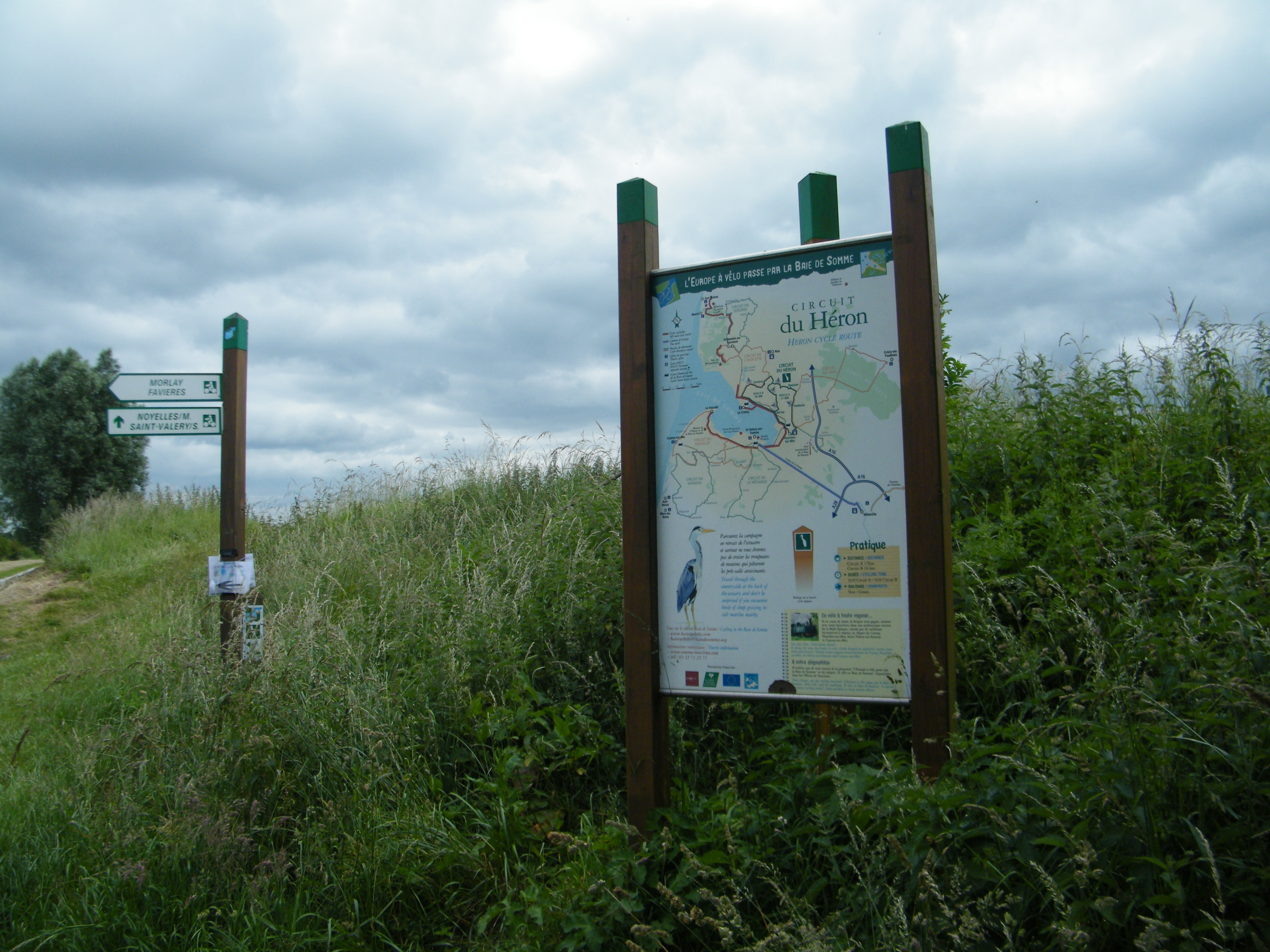
Roadsign in Morlay.

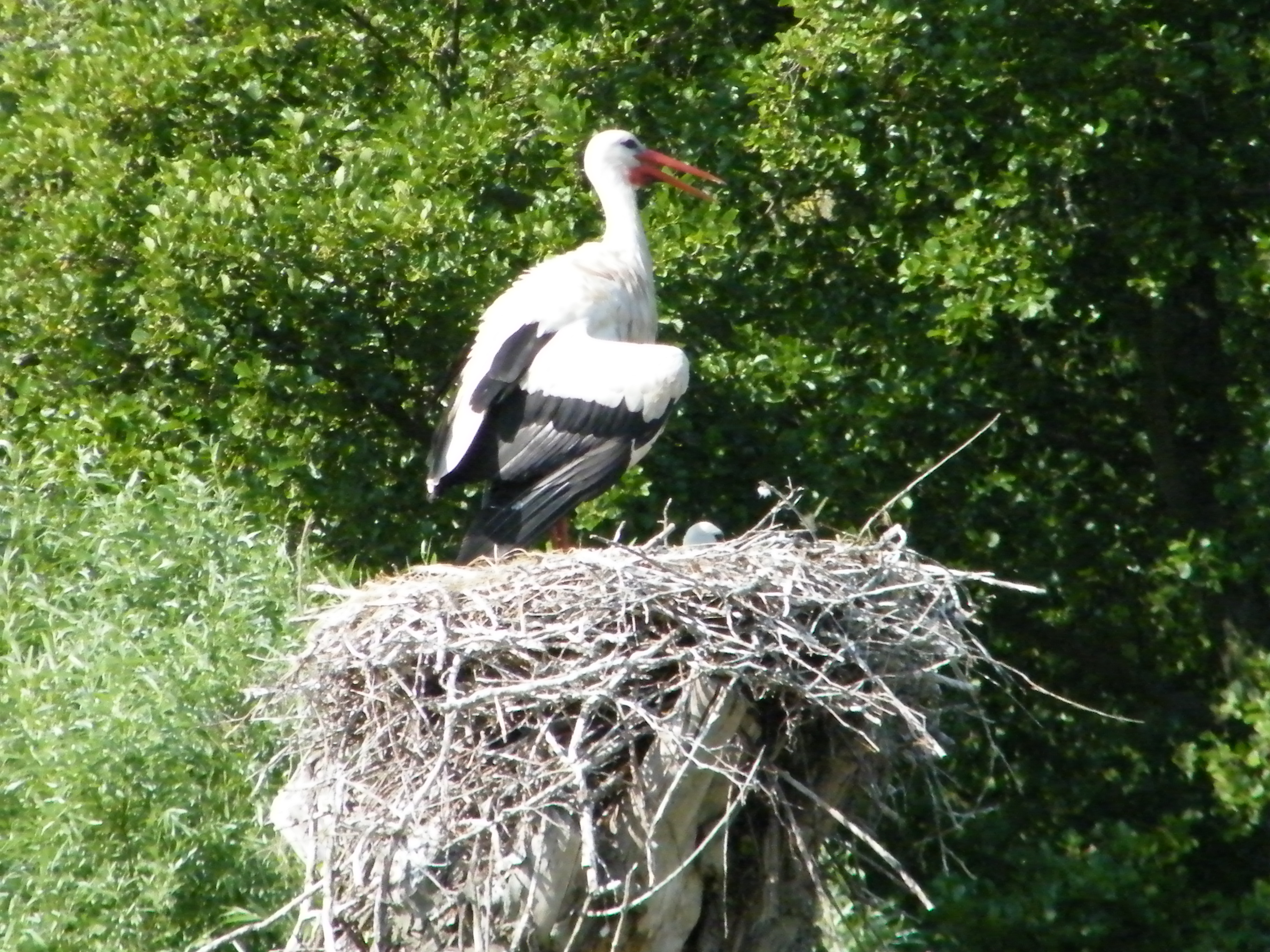
Stork in Romaine.

== See also ==
- Communes of the Somme department
