= Presles, Val-d'Oise =

Presles
- Commune
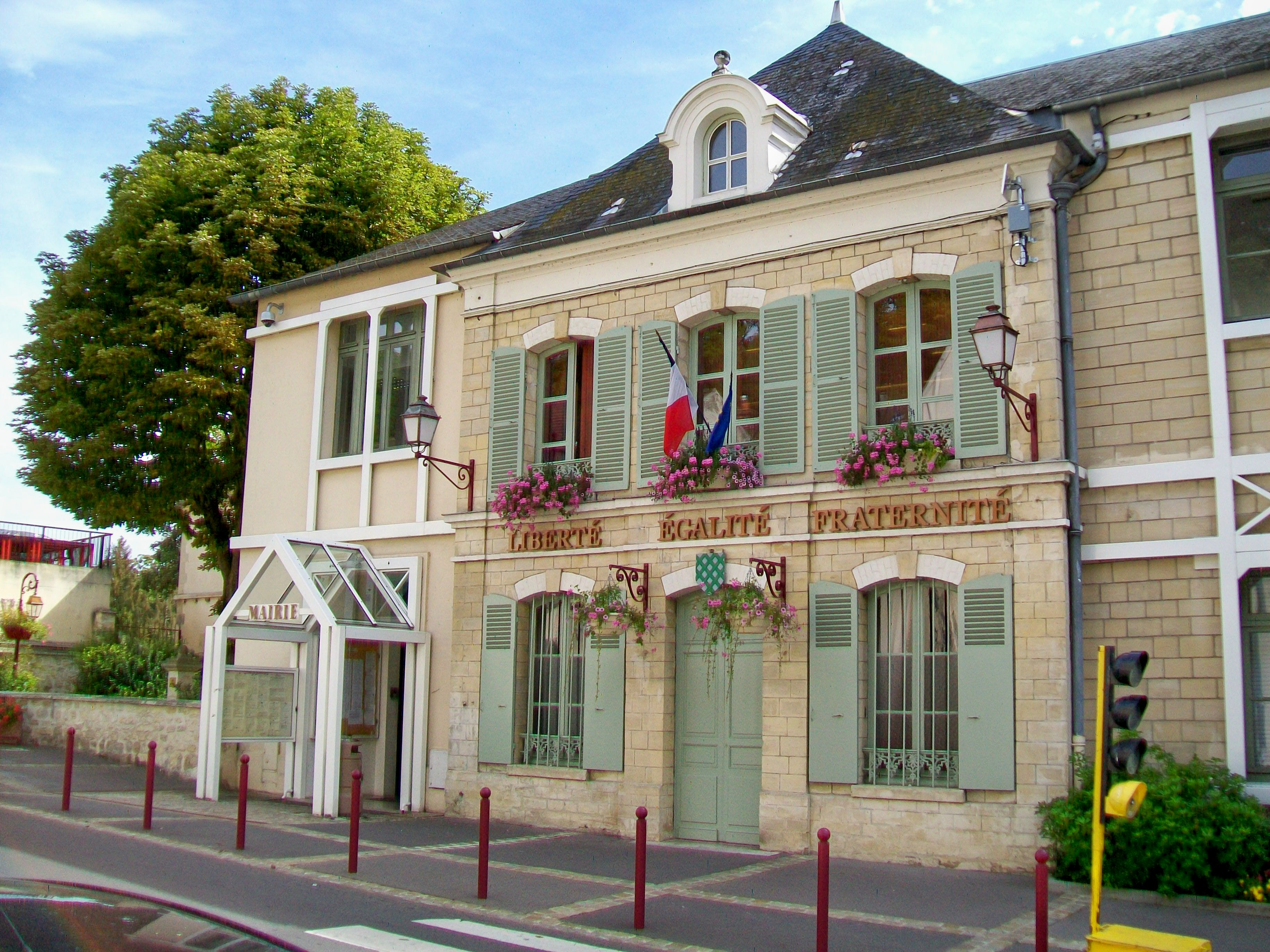
- Mairie

- Coat of arms
- Location of Presles
- Location within France Location within Île-de-France (region)
- Coordinates: 49°06′57″N 2°16′59″E
- Country: France
- Region: Île-de-France
- Department: Val-d'Oise
- Arrondissement: Pontoise
- Canton: L'Isle-Adam
- Intercommunality: Vallée de l'Oise et des Trois forêts

Government
  - Mayor (2023–2026): Céline Caudron
- Area^{1}: 9.95 km^{2} (3.84 sq mi)
- Highest elevation: 210 m (690 ft)
- Lowest elevation: 26 m (85 ft)
- Population (2023): 4,017
  - Density: 404/km^{2} (1,050/sq mi)
- Time zone: UTC+01:00 (CET)
  - Summer (DST): UTC+02:00 (CEST)
- INSEE/Postal code: 95504 /95590
- ^{1} French Land Register data, which excludes lakes, ponds, glaciers > 1 km^{2} (0.386 sq mi or 247 acres) and river estuaries.

Presles (French pronunciation: [pʁɛl]) is a commune in the Val-d'Oise département in Île-de-France in northern France. Presles–Courcelles station has rail connections to Persan, Sarcelles and Paris.

== History ==
The lordship of Presles was held by Pierre the Fat, chamberlain of King Philip IV of France, in the late 13th century.

== Population ==
Historical population
Year	Pop.	±% p.a.
1968	2,450	—
1975	2,927	+2.57%
1982	3,117	+0.90%
1990	3,566	+1.70%
1999	3,728	+0.49%
2007	3,827	+0.33%
2012	3,701	−0.67%
2017	3,904	+1.07%
2023	4,017	+0.48%
Source: INSEE

Inhabitants are known as Preslois (male) or Presloises (female) in French.

== See also ==
- Communes of the Val-d'Oise department
