= Groupe d'information et de soutien des immigrés =

French non-profit organization

The Groupe d'information et de soutien des immigrés is a French non-profit organization for human rights created in 1972 to protect the legal and political rights of foreigners and immigrants and to advocate freedom of movement across borders.

It provides information and support to immigrants through its knowledge of immigration law, French, European and, in some respects, international, and its experience of immigration practices. It defends foreigners, offers training and publications and participates in the debate on migration policies.
