= Musée des tramways à vapeur et des chemins de fer secondaires français =

- MTVS
- Established: 1976
- Location: Butry-sur-Oise, Val-d'Oise
- Coordinates: 49.0904833°N 2.20098611°E
- Type: Railway museum
- Collection size: 11 steam locomotives 5 diesel locotractors 27 passenger cars
- Visitors: 5,000
- President: Olivier Janneau
- Website: MTVS museum

The Musée des tramways à vapeur et des chemins de fer secondaires français (Museum of French steam tramways and secondary railways — MTVS) is located alongside Valmondois railway station, in the small town of Butry-sur-Oise in the departement of Val-d'Oise, 30 kilometres (19 mi) north of Paris.
The museum houses a collection of railway vehicles from the former French departmental railways, preserved, restored and rebuilt by the members of an association. During the season, short trips can be made on some of the exhibits, at a separate location in the town of Crèvecoeur le Grand, along a metre gauge (1,000 mm (3 ft 3 3/8 in)) line, three kilometers (1.86 miles) in length, nicknamed the "Impressionists' railway".

== History ==
Established in 1976 on the site of the former railway line from Valmondois to the town of Marines, the 'Association of the Transportation Museum of the Sausseron Valley' patiently assembled a collection of railway vehicles from the old regional French networks. The collection has become the most important in France on the theme of secondary railways using the one metre gauge.

The museum was founded after the recovery of two tram engines, N°16 and 60 (seen below), after being abandoned in a forest. They were originally from the Tramways de la Sarthe in the west of France. In 1999, the association changed its name to the Musée des Tramways à Vapeur et des chemins de fer Secondaires français. In October 2006, the association celebrated its thirtieth anniversary.

It was once planned for the museum to be moved further northwest to the Vexin region, where it would have had larger storage space and a longer railway line to use for its train journeys, but the project was abandoned in March 2009.

During the winter of 2007–08, the terminus of the small passenger line became inaccessible when large rocks fell onto the track. Journeys were restricted to the Rue de Parmain.

Since 2013, a project is under way to transfer the museum to Crèvecœur-le-Grand, called the "Train à Vapeur du Beauvaisis", which is now the association's main activity center. The new line, built on an abandoned SNCF right of way, operates since 2019 between the main station at Crèvecœur-le-Grand and a small halt of Rotangy, a distance of 3.5 km (2.2 mi). The line is to be extended further in the next years, first reaching the station at Oudeuil, and then lastly the town of Saint-Omer-en-Chaussée, for a total length of 11.9 km (7.4 mi).

Map of the future line Crèvecœur-le-Grand and Saint-Omer-en-Chaussée.

== Collection ==
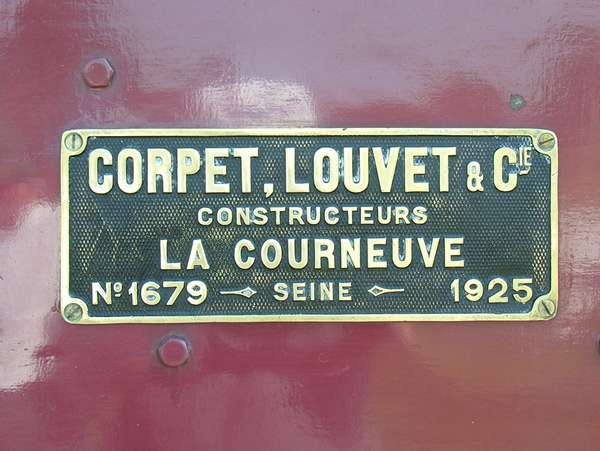
Works plate of Corpet-Louvet N° 1679 of 1925 (Chemin de fer des Côtes-du-Nord Nº 36)

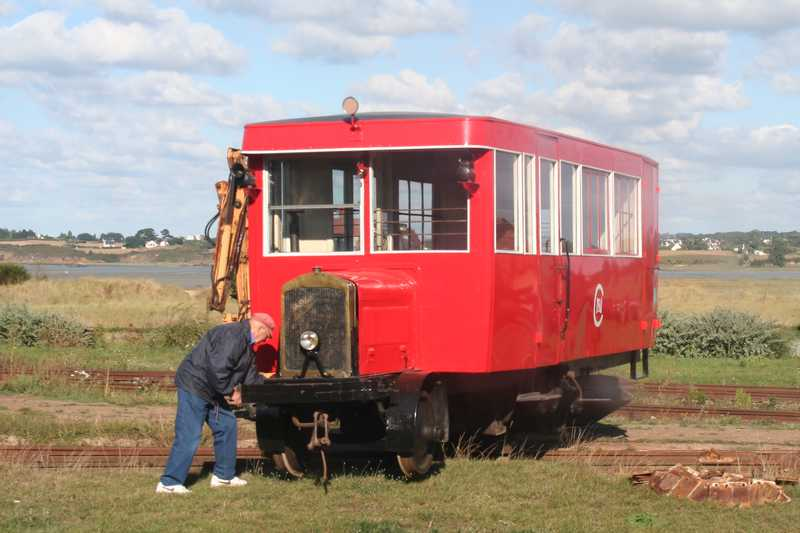
De Dion-Bouton JM4 railcar #11 currently exhibited in MTVS

It operates :

- 11 steam engines including :
  - Tramway de la Sarthe Nº 60, a 0-6-0 steam tram locomotive by the Ateliers du Nord de la France, Blanc-Misseron (Nº 213 of 1898), the first railway vehicle classified as a Monument historique in France
  - Chemin de Fer des Côtes-du-Nord Nº 36, an 0-6-0T by Corpet-Louvet (Nº 1679 of 1925), classified as a Monument historique
  - Tramway d'Ille et Vilaine N° 75, a 0-6-0 steam tram locomotive built by Corpet-Louvet in 1909, also classified as MH
- 5 diesel locotractors
- 1 electric railcar (automotrice électrique)
- 3 diesel railcars (autorail)
- 27 passenger cars; among which :
  - 3 come from the Tramways d'Ille et Vilaine (bodies of the cars TIV B34, B 37 and B 73, circulating on the platforms of flatbed wagons)
  - 2 from the Tramways de la Sarthe, (bodies of cars B36 and B56)
- 3 luggage cars
- about 30 freight cars

Thirty vehicles of the collection are Monuments Historiques and 7 are inscribed in the supplementary inventory of the Monuments historiques.

=== Steam engines ===
MTVS No.	Name	Wheel type	Builder	Works No.	Year Built	Empty weight		Status	Origin	Notes
Nº 4	Pierre Jansen	0-4-0T	SLM, Winterthur	1891	1909	13.5 t		On display	Mont Blanc Tramway	
Nº 2	Venus	0-4-0T	Corpet-Louvet	710	1898	8 t		Restoration halted	Company Piketty (sand pits)	Distribution "Brown system" - Engine in restoration in the Steamrail.net program - Monument historique
Nº 26		0-4-0T	Corpet-Louvet	1673	1927	14.8 t		In storage	Company « Paul Frot » (public works)	
Nº 1	Le Coucou	0-4-0T	John Cockerill	2691	1908	12 t		In storage	Forges de Gueugnon	Vertical boiler
Nº 16	St Denis d'Orques	0-6-0T	Ateliers du Nord de la France, Blanc-Misseron	19	1882	11 t		In storage	Tramways de la Sarthe	
Nº 60	La Ferté Bernard	0-6-0T	Ateliers du Nord de la France, Blanc-Misseron	213	1898	12.8 t	Blanc-Misseron 0-6-0T n°60	In operation	Tramways de la Sarthe	Monument historique
Nº 75		0-6-0T	Corpet-Louvet	1234	1909			In operation	Tramways d'Ille-et-Vilaine	Monument historique
Nº 36	Lulu	0-6-0T	Corpet-Louvet	1679	1925	20.5 t	Corpet-Louvet 0-6-0T n°36	Awaiting restoration	Chemin de Fer des Côtes-du-Nord	Monument historique. On loan to GECP to run as a tourist train on the line of Chemins de Fer de Provence.
Nº 13		2-6-0T	SACM	7381	1924		SACM 2-6-0T n°13	On display	Ligne Berck-Plage - Paris-Plage (B.P.)	Ex. VFIL Pas-de-Calais, Ex. VFIL Oise. Monument historique
E96		2-6-0T	Orenstein & Koppel (Decauville)	5755	1913	23 t		Restoration in progress	Linha do Vouga Nº 6, Portugal	Built by Decauville; pieces then sent to Orenstein & Koppel, identical to the engines 121 to 124 of CFD Charentes and Deux-Sèvres. Monument historique.
Nº 14	La Mame	0-6-0T	Corpet-Louvet	691	1897	18 t	N°14 at Crèvecoeur-Le-Grand	Restoration in progress	Chemins de Fer de la Drôme	Built by Corpet-Louvet, stayed unknown and untouched for a few decades before being bought and resurfacing again.

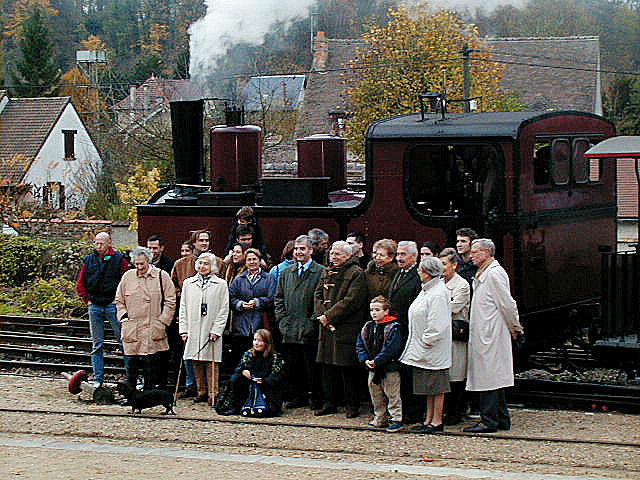
The Corpet and Louvet families in front of Lulu at the MTVS (2000)

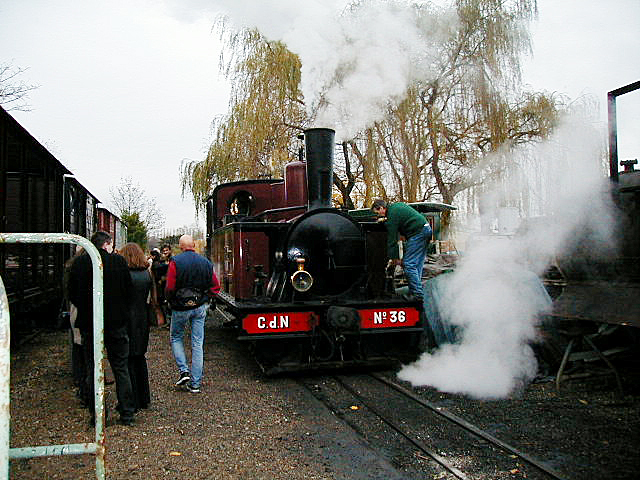
The descendants of Lucien Corpet and Lulu at the MTVS (2000)

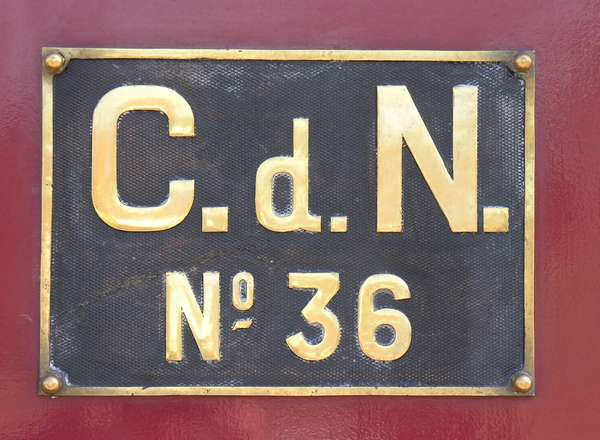
Numberplate of Chemin de fer des Côtes-du-Nord Nº 36 Lulu

== Timetable ==
The museum is open from the beginning of May to the first weekend in October from 14:30 to 18:00 on Sundays.

A yearly festival is organized during the first weekend of October.

== Address ==
Musée des Tramways à Vapeur et des chemins de fer Secondaires français
Mairie de Butry
95430 Butry-sur-Oise

Train à Vapeur du Beauvaisis

Place de la gare

60360 Crèvecoeur-Le-Grand
