= Champagne-sur-Oise =

- Commune
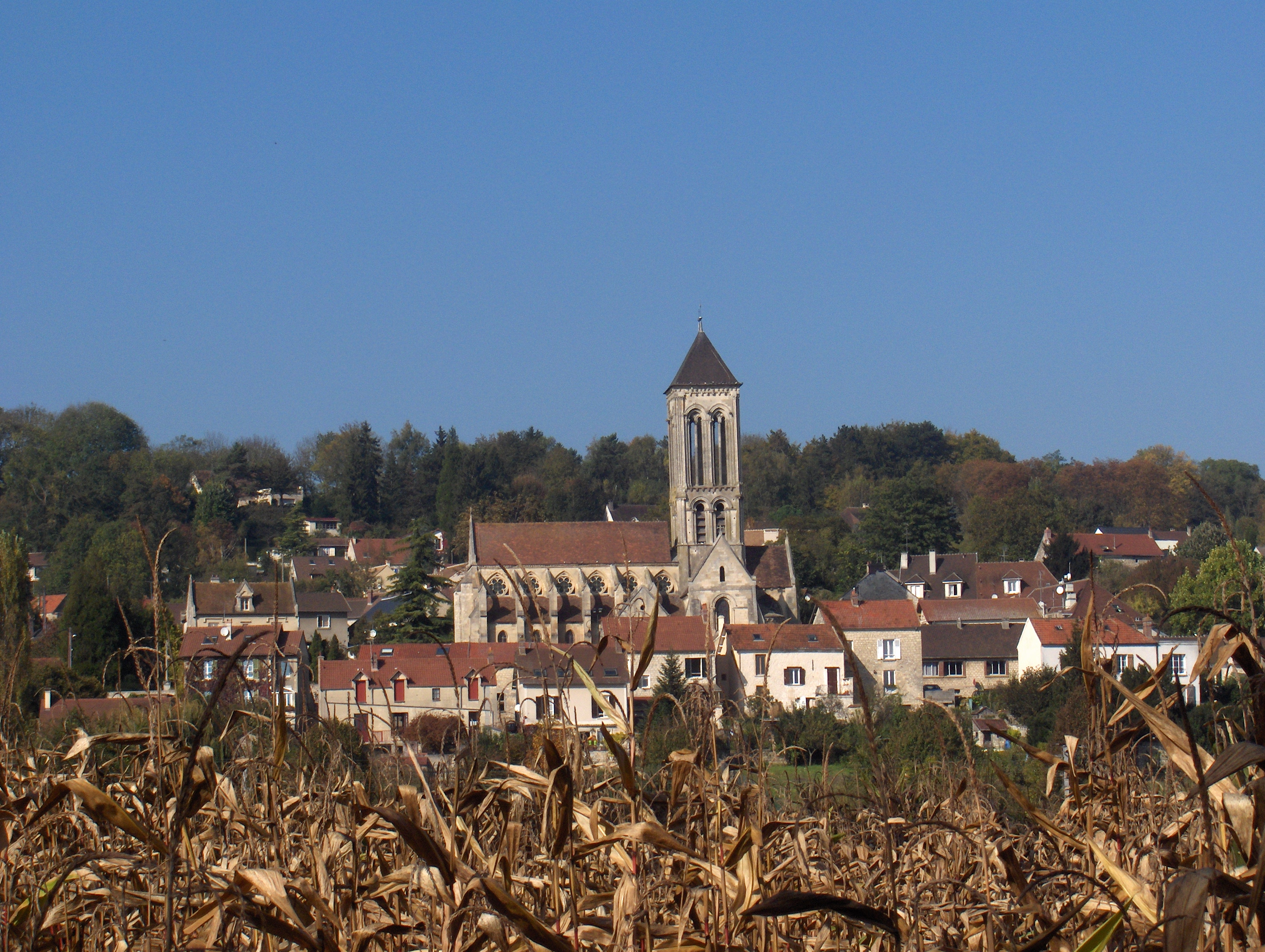
- Notre-Dame de l'Assomption

- Coat of arms
- Location of Champagne-sur-Oise
- Location within France Location within Île-de-France (region)
- Coordinates: 49°08′11″N 2°14′10″E
- Country: France
- Region: Île-de-France
- Department: Val-d'Oise
- Arrondissement: Pontoise
- Canton: L'Isle-Adam
- Intercommunality: CC du Haut Val-d'Oise

Government
  - Mayor (2020–2026): Stéphane Carteado
- Area^{1}: 9.45 km^{2} (3.65 sq mi)
- Highest elevation: 176 m (577 ft)
- Lowest elevation: 23 m (75 ft)
- Population (2023): 5,036
  - Density: 533/km^{2} (1,380/sq mi)
- Demonym: Champenois
- Time zone: UTC+01:00 (CET)
  - Summer (DST): UTC+02:00 (CEST)
- INSEE/Postal code: 95134 /95660
- Website: champagne95.fr
- ^{1} French Land Register data, which excludes lakes, ponds, glaciers > 1 km^{2} (0.386 sq mi or 247 acres) and river estuaries.

Champagne-sur-Oise (French pronunciation: [ʃɑ̃paɲ syʁ waz]; lit. 'Champagne-on-Oise') is a commune in the Val-d'Oise department in Île-de-France in northern France. Champagne-sur-Oise station has rail connections to Persan, Creil, Pontoise and Paris (at Gare du Nord).

== Geography ==
Champagne-sur-Oise is on the departmental border with Oise at Chambly.

=== Climate ===
Champagne-sur-Oise has an oceanic climate (Köppen climate classification Cfb). The average annual temperature in Champagne-sur-Oise is 12.0 °C (53.6 °F). The average annual rainfall is 682.8 mm (26.88 in) with December as the wettest month. The temperatures are highest on average in July, at around 19.9 °C (67.8 °F), and lowest in January, at around 4.8 °C (40.6 °F). The highest temperature ever recorded in Champagne-sur-Oise was 41.6 °C (106.9 °F) on 25 July 2019; the coldest temperature ever recorded was −12.4 °C (9.7 °F) on 1 January 1997.

Climate data for Champagne-sur-Oise (1981−2010 normals, extremes 1988−2021)
| Month | Jan | Feb | Mar | Apr | May | Jun | Jul | Aug | Sep | Oct | Nov | Dec | Year |
|---|---|---|---|---|---|---|---|---|---|---|---|---|---|
| Record high °C (°F) | 16.9 (62.4) | 21.5 (70.7) | 24.9 (76.8) | 28.9 (84.0) | 33.4 (92.1) | 38.3 (100.9) | 41.6 (106.9) | 40.8 (105.4) | 35.3 (95.5) | 30.4 (86.7) | 23.7 (74.7) | 18.4 (65.1) | 41.6 (106.9) |
| Mean daily maximum °C (°F) | 7.5 (45.5) | 9.1 (48.4) | 13.0 (55.4) | 16.1 (61.0) | 20.4 (68.7) | 23.2 (73.8) | 25.7 (78.3) | 25.9 (78.6) | 21.7 (71.1) | 16.9 (62.4) | 11.0 (51.8) | 7.3 (45.1) | 16.5 (61.7) |
| Daily mean °C (°F) | 4.8 (40.6) | 5.6 (42.1) | 8.5 (47.3) | 10.8 (51.4) | 14.9 (58.8) | 17.6 (63.7) | 19.9 (67.8) | 19.9 (67.8) | 16.3 (61.3) | 12.5 (54.5) | 7.7 (45.9) | 4.8 (40.6) | 12.0 (53.6) |
| Mean daily minimum °C (°F) | 2.0 (35.6) | 2.1 (35.8) | 3.9 (39.0) | 5.6 (42.1) | 9.4 (48.9) | 12.1 (53.8) | 14.1 (57.4) | 13.9 (57.0) | 10.9 (51.6) | 8.2 (46.8) | 4.5 (40.1) | 2.2 (36.0) | 7.4 (45.3) |
| Record low °C (°F) | −12.4 (9.7) | −11.9 (10.6) | −11.1 (12.0) | −2.7 (27.1) | 2.0 (35.6) | 1.9 (35.4) | 5.2 (41.4) | 4.4 (39.9) | 0.0 (32.0) | −4.2 (24.4) | −10.3 (13.5) | −12.3 (9.9) | −12.4 (9.7) |
| Average precipitation mm (inches) | 61.8 (2.43) | 48.5 (1.91) | 53.0 (2.09) | 53.8 (2.12) | 55.4 (2.18) | 55.0 (2.17) | 59.9 (2.36) | 54.7 (2.15) | 50.6 (1.99) | 66.7 (2.63) | 54.9 (2.16) | 68.5 (2.70) | 682.8 (26.88) |
| Average precipitation days (≥ 1.0 mm) | 11.4 | 9.7 | 10.6 | 9.3 | 9.8 | 8.9 | 8.0 | 7.6 | 8.4 | 10.3 | 10.8 | 11.5 | 116.3 |
Source: Météo-France

== Population ==
Historical population
| Year | Pop. | ±% p.a. |
|---|---|---|
| 1968 | 2,381 | — |
| 1975 | 2,666 | +1.63% |
| 1982 | 3,110 | +2.23% |
| 1990 | 3,700 | +2.20% |
| 1999 | 3,889 | +0.56% |
| 2007 | 4,451 | +1.70% |
| 2012 | 4,692 | +1.06% |
| 2017 | 5,018 | +1.35% |
| 2023 | 5,036 | +0.06% |
Source: INSEE

== See also ==
- Communes of the Val-d'Oise department
