= Corpet-Louvet =

French steam locomotive manufacturer

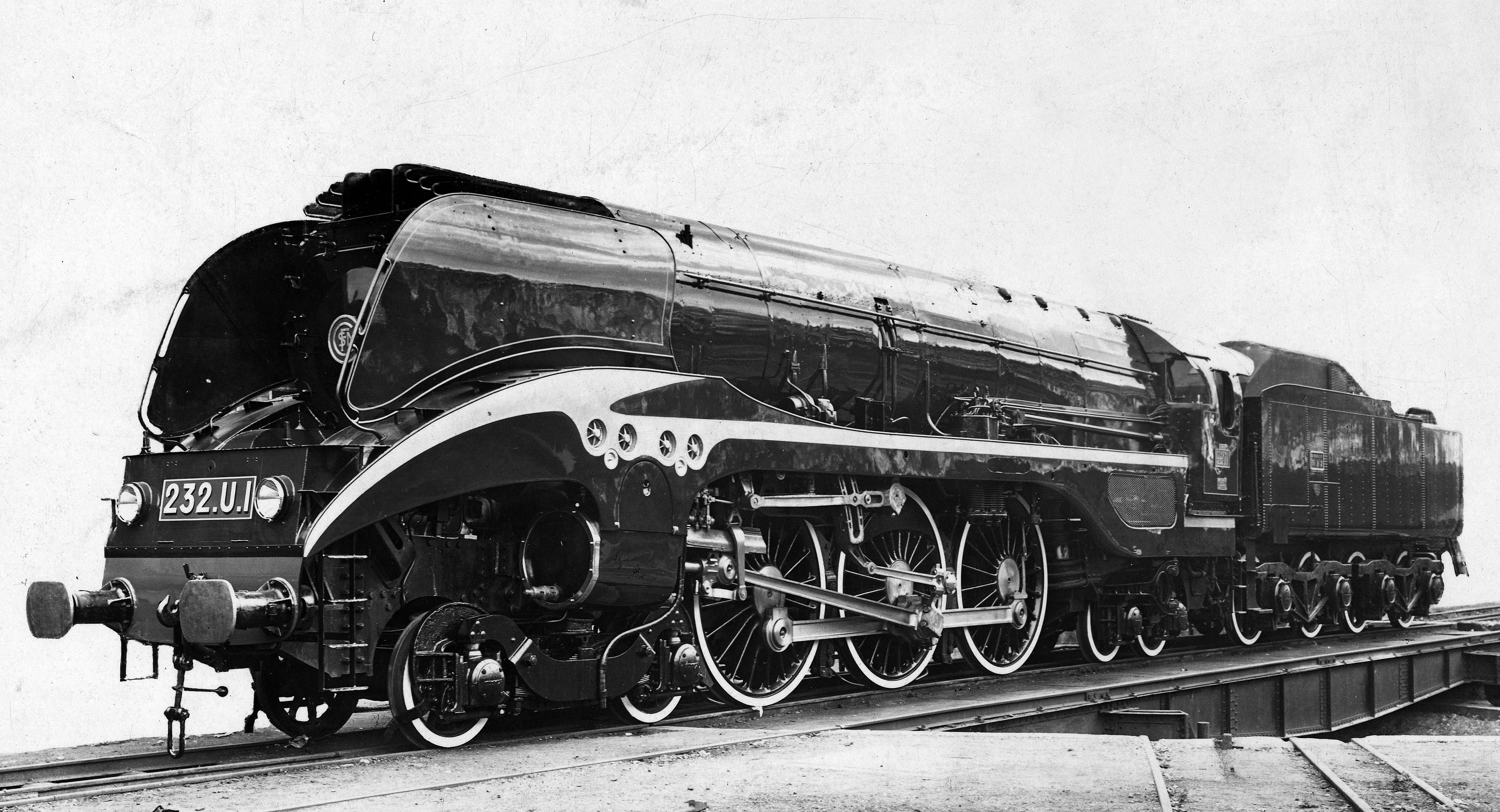
SNCF 232.U.1 in a manufacturers' photograph (Works no. 1908 of 1949)

Corpet-Louvet was a steam locomotive manufacturer based in Paris, France.

== History ==
Founded in 1855 as Anjubault, based in the Avenue Phillippe-Auguste in Paris, the firm was taken over by Lucien Corpet in 1868. Corpet's daughter Marguerite married Lucien Louvet, the engineer of the Compagnie Meusienne des Chemins de Fer, which used Corpet locomotives. Corpet died in 1889, and the management of the firm was taken over by Louvet. In 1912, the firm moved to new premises at La Corneuve, and a limited liability company, Corpet, Louvet et Compagnie was formed. The last steam locomotive was built in 1953, but the company is still in business, manufacturing "Caterpillar" earth moving equipment under licence.

== Locomotives ==
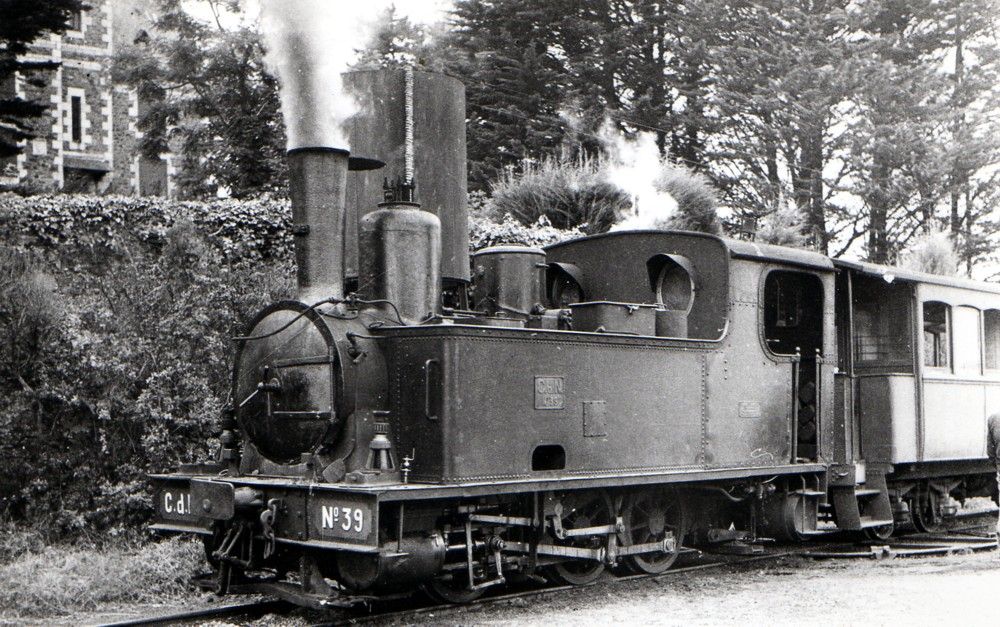
Chemin de fer des Côtes du Nord #39 (Works no. 1682 of 1925)

The locomotives built by Corpet-Louvet had four different names on the worksplates.

=== Anjubault ===
Works numbers 1 to 121 carried Anjubault worksplates. The first three locomotives were built for the Compagnie d'Orsay and were named L'Yvette, L'Orge and Le Florian. They were all standard gauge. Almost all Anjubault locomotives were four coupled locomotives, but works number 4 bis (a duplicate works number) was a six coupled locomotive built for the Compagnie Est-Landon in 1858. The majority of Anjubault locomotives were sold to contractors building new railway lines in France. A few locomotives are known to have been sold to India, Russia, Spain and Switzerland.

=== L Corpet ===
Works numbers 122 to 565 carried L Corpet worksplates. In the 1870s and 1880s, Lucien Corpet continued to build four-coupled locomotives and also started to build six-coupled locomotives, including some designed to be able to be regauged. This design was introduced in 1880. The first metre gauge locomotives built for light railways were works numbers 314 and 315 built for the Chemin de Fer de Cambrésis in 1880 and 1881. Corpet introduced Brown valve gear on some of his locomotives in 1881. This system was popular with Swiss Locomotive Works at Winterthur, Switzerland. Works numbers 341-44 were the first Corpet locomotives with Brown valve gear.

=== Vve L Corpet & L Louvet ===
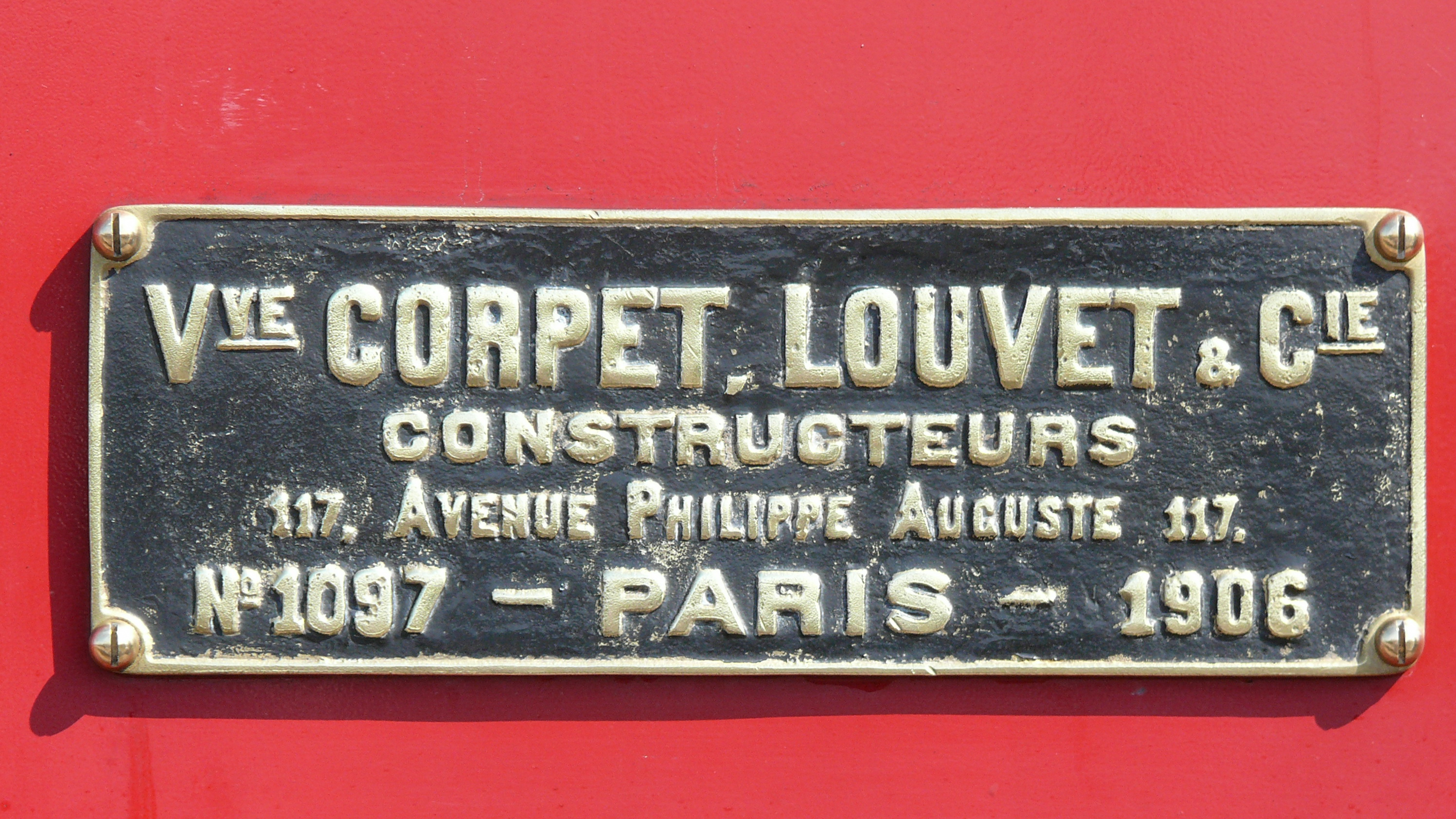
Works plate from No. 1097 of 1906: Transports de l'Aisne #1

Works numbers 566 to 1415 carried Vve L Corpet & L Louvet works plates. At the end of the 1880s and into the 1890s many light railways were built in France, many of them to metre gauge. Metre gauge six-coupled tank locomotives formed the bulk of Corpet-Louvet's production until the outbreak of the First World War. In the Ardennes, light railways were built to 800 millimetres (2 ft 7 in) gauge. Corpet-Louvet supplied fourteen locomotives between 1895 and 1906. The line and locomotives were later converted to metre gauge. Corpet-Louvet also built Mallet locomotives, the first being 0-4-4-0s built in 1897 for the Tramways à Vapeur d'Ille et Vilaine. Works numbers 1409 - 13 were 0-6-6-0 Mallets built for the Chemin de Fer du Centre. These were the largest metre gauge locomotives built by Corpet-Louvet.

=== Corpet, Louvet & Compagnie ===
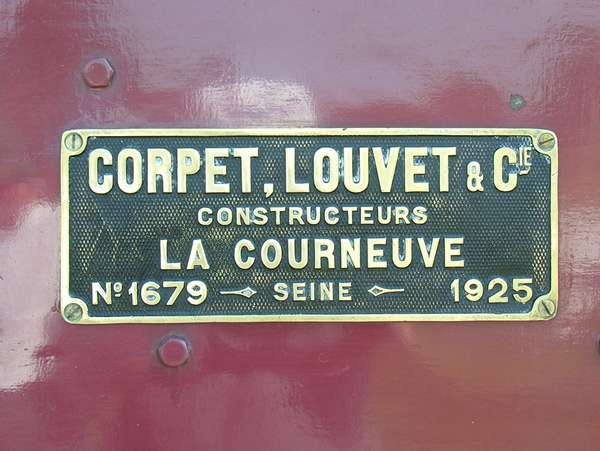
Works plate from No. 1679 of 1925: Chemin de Fer des Côtes-du-Nord #36

Works numbers 1416 to 1962 carried Corpet, Louvet & Compagnie worksplates. Production was severely hit by the First World War, with only three locomotives being outshopped in 1915 and none in 1916. During the 1920s, production was mainly metre gauge six-coupled tank engines. During the early 1930s, production was mainly 1,435 mm (4 ft 8 1/2 in) standard gauge 0-8-0ST and 2-10-2ST locomotives. The Depression hit the firm hard, with only two locomotives being delivered in 1934, 1935, 1936 and 1938. No new locomotives were delivered in 1937 or 1939. During the Second World War locomotives under construction when Paris fell were completed, but some could not be delivered to their intended customers and remained in France.

The largest locomotives built by Corpet-Louvet were ten 2-10-2T locomotives built for SNCF in 1940–42. These weighed 91 t (89.6 long tons; 100.3 short tons). Six standard gauge 0-8-0ST locomotives were built for Krupp in 1944. It is thought these locomotives carried Krupp works plates. The first locomotive delivered after the liberation of Paris in August 1944 was works number 1875, a standard gauge 0-8-0T of similar design to those built for Krupp. The last locomotive built for a French light railway was works number 1926 built for the Chemin de Fer de Cambrésis in 1948. The last locomotive, works number 1962 was ordered by the Houillères du Bassin d'Auvergne but subsequently cancelled. However, a locomotive carrying works number 1962 was recorded in service with the company in 1955!

== Preserved Corpet-Louvet locomotives ==
Image	Works number	Year	Type	Gauge	Identity	Location
	439	1887	0-6-0PT	600 mm (1 ft 11 5/8 in)	Minas de Aller "2", Sociedad Hullera Española 2,	Statfold Barn Railway
	467	1888	0-6-0PT	600 mm (1 ft 11 5/8 in)	Minas de Aller "3", Sociedad Hullera Española 3,	Lousal Mines (Portugal)
	493	1888	0-6-0T	1,000 mm (3 ft 3 3/8 in)	Loddington Ironstone Co., ex Chemin de fer du Cambrésis #5	Irchester Narrow Gauge Railway Museum
	534	1890	0-6-2T	1,000 mm (3 ft 3 3/8 in)	SE Meuse #26	Bar-le-Duc, France
	542	1891	0-6-0PT	600 mm (1 ft 11 5/8 in)	Minas de Aller "5", Sociedad Hullera Española # 5	Museo del Ferrocaril de Asturias, Gijón (Spain)
	691	1897	0-6-0T	1,000 mm (3 ft 3 3/8 in)	CF Drôme #14	Charente, France
	710	1898			Enterprise Piketty	Musée des tramways à vapeur et des chemins de fer secondaires français (MTVS), Butry-sur-Oise
	1097	1906	2-6-0T	1,000 mm (3 ft 3 3/8 in)	Transports de l'Aisne #1	Chemin de Fer de la Baie de Somme, Saint-Valery-sur-Somme
	1087	1907	0-6-0T	1,000 mm (3 ft 3 3/8 in)	Chemins de Fer Nord-Pas de Calais	Érezée, Belgium
	1234	1909	0-6-0T	1,000 mm (3 ft 3 3/8 in)	Tramway d'Ille-et-Vilaine #75	Musée des tramways à vapeur et des chemins de fer secondaires français (MTVS), Butry-sur-Oise
	1250	1909	0-6-0T	1,000 mm (3 ft 3 3/8 in)	CF Économiques des Charentes No. 52	Charente, France
	1546	1918	0-4-0T	1,435 mm (4 ft 8 1/2 in)	#105, Forges de Fourchambault	Musée Vivant du Train à Vapeur (AJECTA), Longueville, Paris
	1589	1921	0-4-0T	1,000 mm (3 ft 3 3/8 in)	Enterprise Paul Frot #11	Train du Bas Berry (36)
	1614	1923	0-8-0T	1,000 mm (3 ft 3 3/8 in)	Enterprise Paul Frot #22	Voie Férrées du Velay
	1616	1923	0-8-0T	1,000 mm (3 ft 3 3/8 in)	Enterprise Paul Frot #24	Train du bas Berry (36)
	1629	1924	2-6-2T; TCDD 3511 class	1,435 mm (4 ft 8 1/2 in)	TCDD #3513	Kaklik station, Turkey
	1634	1923	0-6-0T	1,435 mm (4 ft 8 1/2 in)	Cévennes Colliery	CFT de la Sarthe, Connerre-Belle, France
	1665	1925	0-6-0T	1,200 mm (3 ft 11 1/4 in)	Trois Rivières Distillery, Martinique. # unknown	Martinique
	1667	1925	0-4-0T	1,000 mm (3 ft 3 3/8 in)	Enterprise Paul Frot #15	Chemin de Fer de la Baie de Somme
	1672	1927	0-4-0T	1,435 mm (4 ft 8 1/2 in)	Enterprise Paul Frot #25	Chemins de Fer de la Baie de Somme
	1673	1927	0-4-0T	1,000 mm (3 ft 3 3/8 in)	Enterprise Paul Frot #26	MTVS, Butry-ur-Oise
	1679	1927	0-6-0T	1,000 mm (3 ft 3 3/8 in)	Chemin de Fer des Côtes-du-Nord #36	MTVS, Butry-sur-Oise
	1701	1925	0-6-0T	1,200 mm (3 ft 11 1/4 in)	Usine Sainte Marie, Martinique	Location: St. James Sugar Cane Museum, Sainte-Marie, Martinique
	1705	1926	2-10-0; TCDD 56911 class	1,435 mm (4 ft 8 1/2 in)	TCDD #56911	Nazilli station, Turkey
	1706	1926	2-10-0; TCDD 56911 class	1,435 mm (4 ft 8 1/2 in)	TCDD #56912	Alaşehir, Turkey
	1708	1929	2-10-0; TCDD 56911 class	1,435 mm (4 ft 8 1/2 in)	TCDD #56914	Çamlik, Turkey
	1711	1926	2-10-0; TCDD 56911 class	1,435 mm (4 ft 8 1/2 in)	TCDD #56917	Çamlik, Turkey
	1718	1926			Usina Rio Una #? Usina Barreiro #6 "Coronel Othon"	Museu do Una in São José da Coroa Grande, PE (Brazil)
	1816	1932	0-6-0T	1,435 mm (4 ft 8 1/2 in)	S.E, 3071	CFT des Landes de Gascogne
	1908	1949	4-6-4; SNCF 232.U	1,435 mm (4 ft 8 1/2 in)	SNCF 232.U.1	Cité du train, Mulhouse, France
	1933	1948	0-6-0T	1,435 mm (4 ft 8 1/2 in)	Cévennes Colliery #8	Ambert, France
	1943	1950	2-8-2; Indian ZE	610 mm (2 ft)	Bengal Nagpur Railway 502, later South Eastern Railway (India) #8 (all-India scheme)	Nainpur station, India
	1953	1951	2-8-2; Indian ZE	610 mm (2 ft)	Bengal Nagpur Railway 512, later South Eastern Railway #18 (all-India scheme)	Purulia, India
	1957	1951	2-6-2; Indian ZB	610 mm (2 ft)	Western Railway (India) #304, Indian Railways #72	Godrha, India
	1958	1951	2-6-2; Indian ZB	610 mm (2 ft)	Western Railway (India) #305, Indian Railways #73	Sanjay Gandhi Botanical Garden, Patna, India
	1962	1951	0-4-0T	1,435 mm (4 ft 8 1/2 in)	Auvergne Collieries	Le Cannet, France, last engine built
