= Valmondois =

- Commune
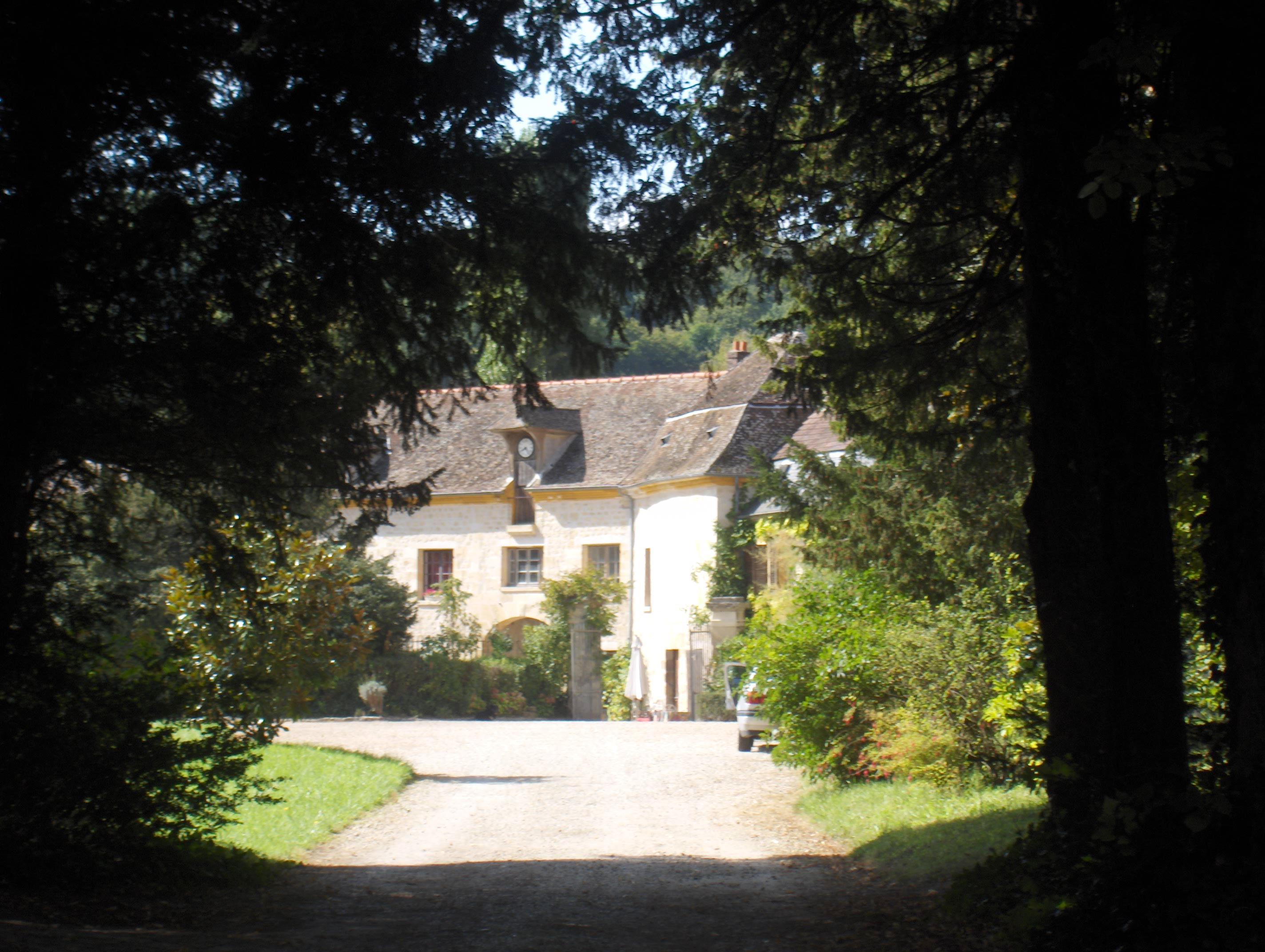
- The Château d'Orgivaux, in Valmondois

- Coat of arms
- Location of Valmondois
- Location within France Location within Île-de-France (region)
- Coordinates: 49°05′50″N 2°11′28″E
- Country: France
- Region: Île-de-France
- Department: Val-d'Oise
- Arrondissement: Pontoise
- Canton: Saint-Ouen-l'Aumône
- Intercommunality: CC Sausseron Impressionnistes

Government
  - Mayor (2020–2026): Bruno Huisman
- Area^{1}: 4.59 km^{2} (1.77 sq mi)
- Highest elevation: 116 m (381 ft)
- Lowest elevation: 24 m (79 ft)
- Population (2023): 1,208
  - Density: 263/km^{2} (682/sq mi)
- Demonym: Valmondoisiens
- Time zone: UTC+01:00 (CET)
  - Summer (DST): UTC+02:00 (CEST)
- INSEE/Postal code: 95628 /95760
- Website: valmondois.fr
- ^{1} French Land Register data, which excludes lakes, ponds, glaciers > 1 km^{2} (0.386 sq mi or 247 acres) and river estuaries.

Valmondois (French pronunciation: [valmɔ̃dwa]) is a commune in the Val-d'Oise department in Île-de-France in northern France. Valmondois station in neighbouring Butry-sur-Oise has rail connections to Persan, Creil, Pontoise and Paris (at Paris-Nord).

== Local attractions ==
- Moulin de la Naze - Musée de la Meunerie

== Notable residents ==
- The artist Honoré Daumier lived here between 1865 until his death in 1879.

== See also ==
- Communes of the Val-d'Oise department
