= Labbeville =

- Commune
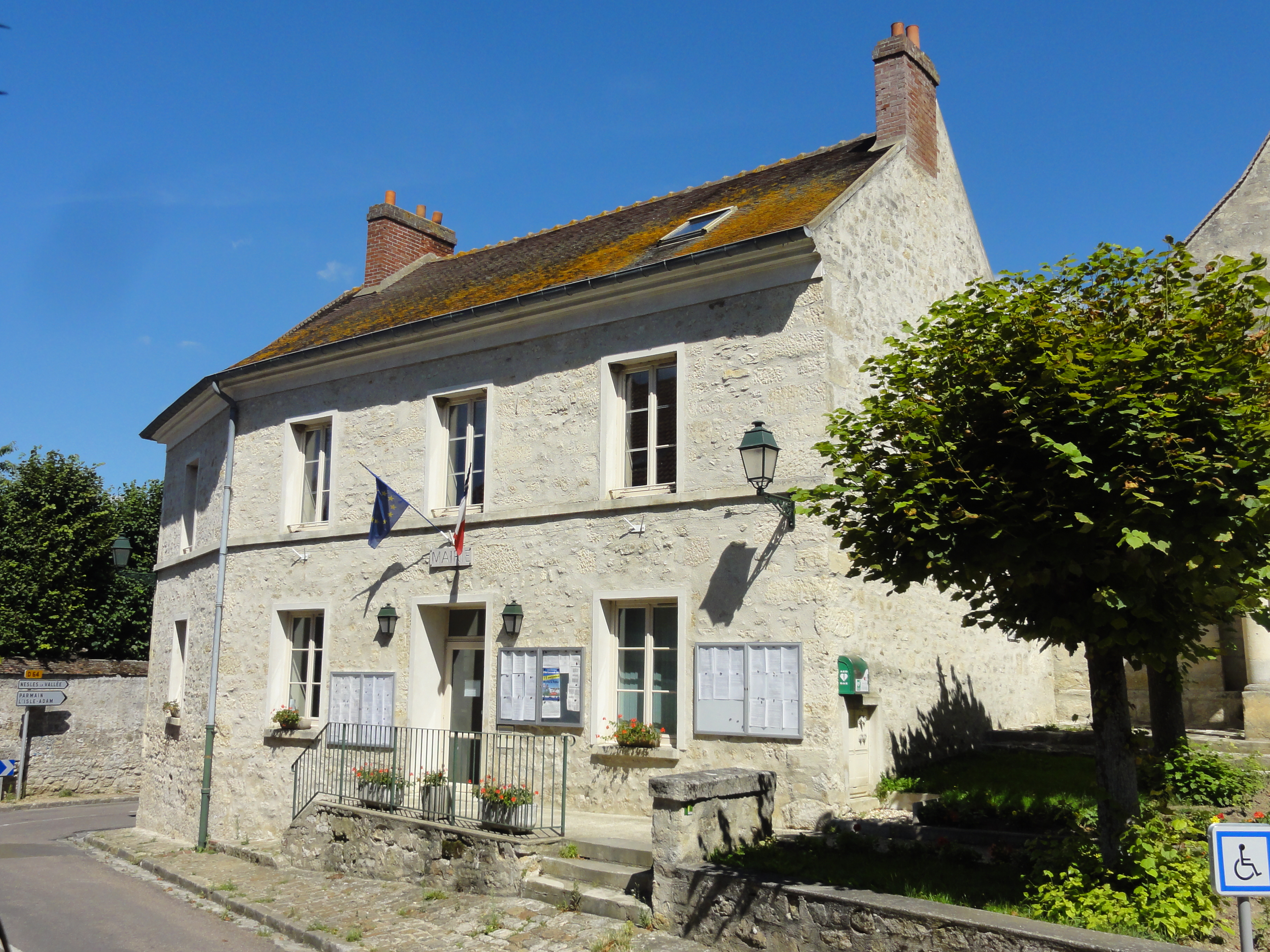
- The town hall of Labbeville

- Coat of arms
- Location of Labbeville
- Location within France Location within Île-de-France (region)
- Coordinates: 49°08′07″N 2°08′38″E
- Country: France
- Region: Île-de-France
- Department: Val-d'Oise
- Arrondissement: Pontoise
- Canton: Saint-Ouen-l'Aumône

Government
  - Mayor (2020–2026): Alain Devillebichot
- Area^{1}: 8.07 km^{2} (3.12 sq mi)
- Highest elevation: 122 m (400 ft)
- Lowest elevation: 38 m (125 ft)
- Population (2023): 641
  - Density: 79.4/km^{2} (206/sq mi)
- Time zone: UTC+01:00 (CET)
  - Summer (DST): UTC+02:00 (CEST)
- INSEE/Postal code: 95328 /95690
- ^{1} French Land Register data, which excludes lakes, ponds, glaciers > 1 km^{2} (0.386 sq mi or 247 acres) and river estuaries.

Labbeville (French pronunciation: [labvil]) is a commune in the Val-d'Oise department in Île-de-France in northern France.

== See also ==
- Communes of the Val-d'Oise department
