= Hédouville =

- Commune
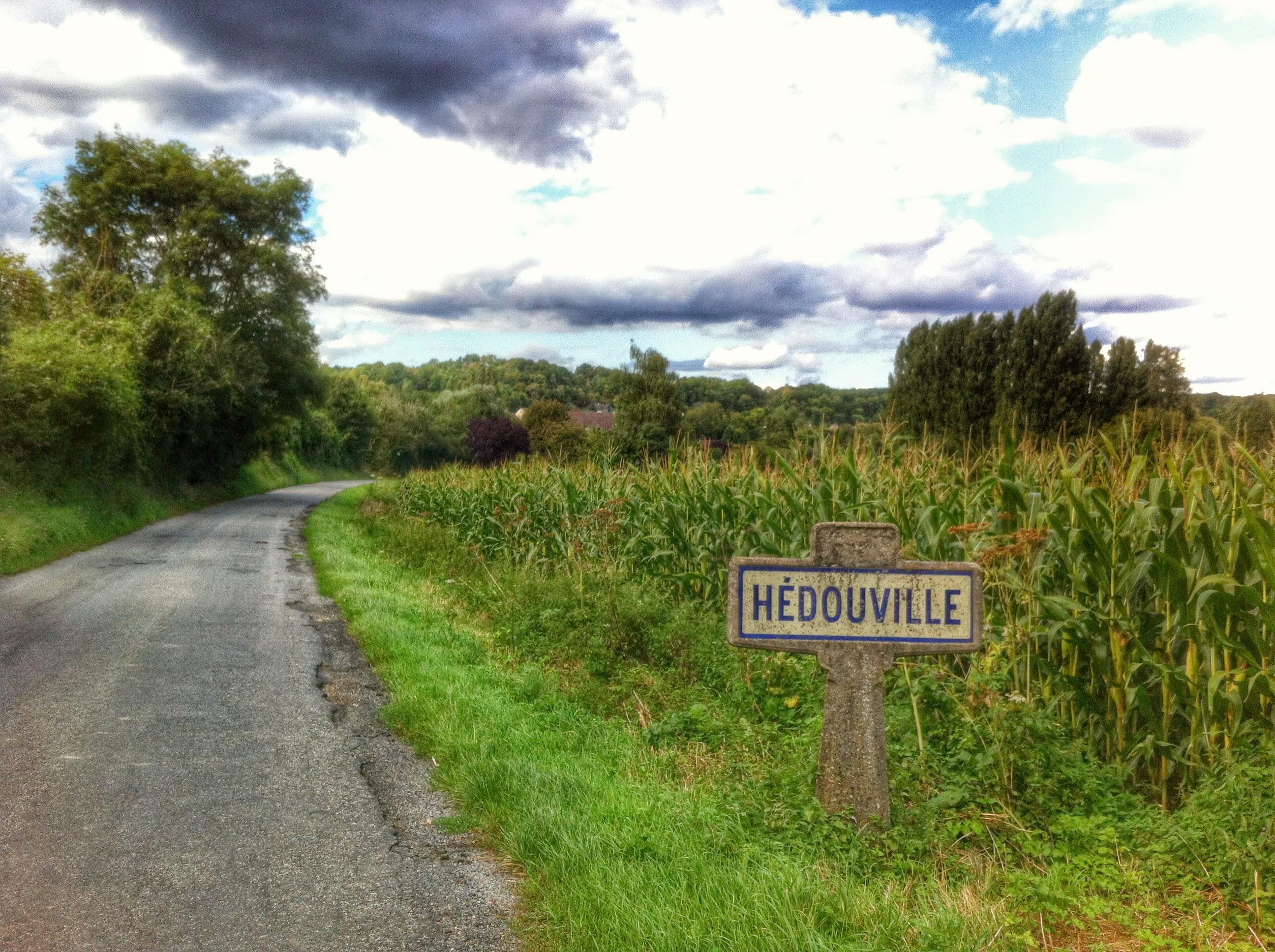
- The road entering the village of Hédouville

- Coat of arms
- Location of Hédouville
- Location within France Location within Île-de-France (region)
- Coordinates: 49°09′16″N 2°10′15″E
- Country: France
- Region: Île-de-France
- Department: Val-d'Oise
- Arrondissement: Pontoise
- Canton: Saint-Ouen-l'Aumône
- Intercommunality: CC Sausseron Impressionnistes

Government
  - Mayor (2020–2026): Eric Couppe
- Area^{1}: 5.28 km^{2} (2.04 sq mi)
- Highest elevation: 182 m (597 ft)
- Lowest elevation: 41 m (135 ft)
- Population (2023): 278
  - Density: 52.7/km^{2} (136/sq mi)
- Time zone: UTC+01:00 (CET)
  - Summer (DST): UTC+02:00 (CEST)
- INSEE/Postal code: 95304 /95690
- ^{1} French Land Register data, which excludes lakes, ponds, glaciers > 1 km^{2} (0.386 sq mi or 247 acres) and river estuaries.

Hédouville (French pronunciation: [eduvil]) is a commune in the Val-d'Oise department in Île-de-France in northern France.

== Geography ==
Hédouville is located just inside Île-de-France, on its border with Hauts-de-France. The town is part of the Parc Naturel Régional du Véxin Français.

== Toponymy ==
The town name has German origins from Haidulf (name) and Latin villa (domain). Hédouville is therefore interpreted as "Domain of Haidulf".

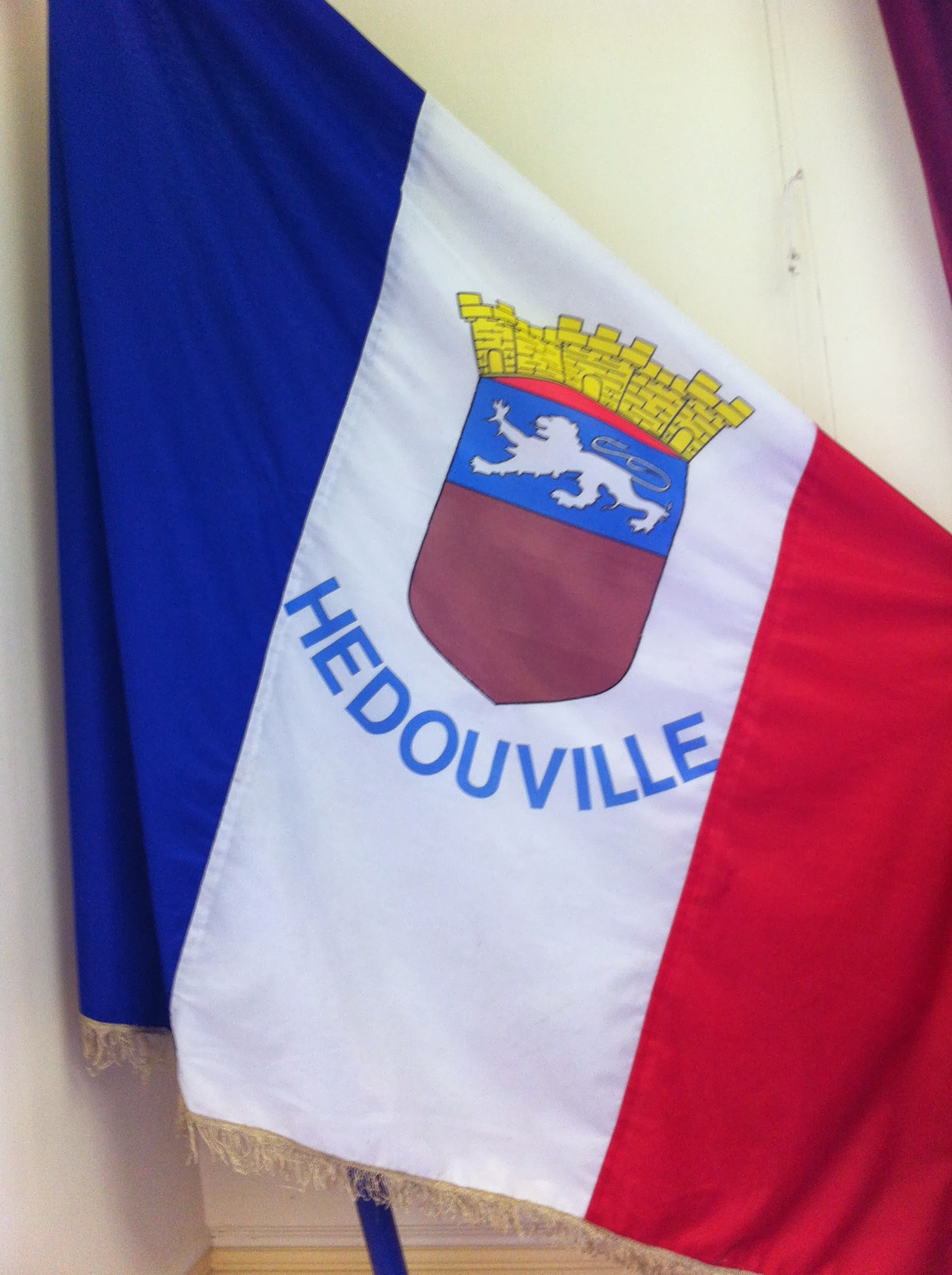
A flag with the coat of arms of Hédouville

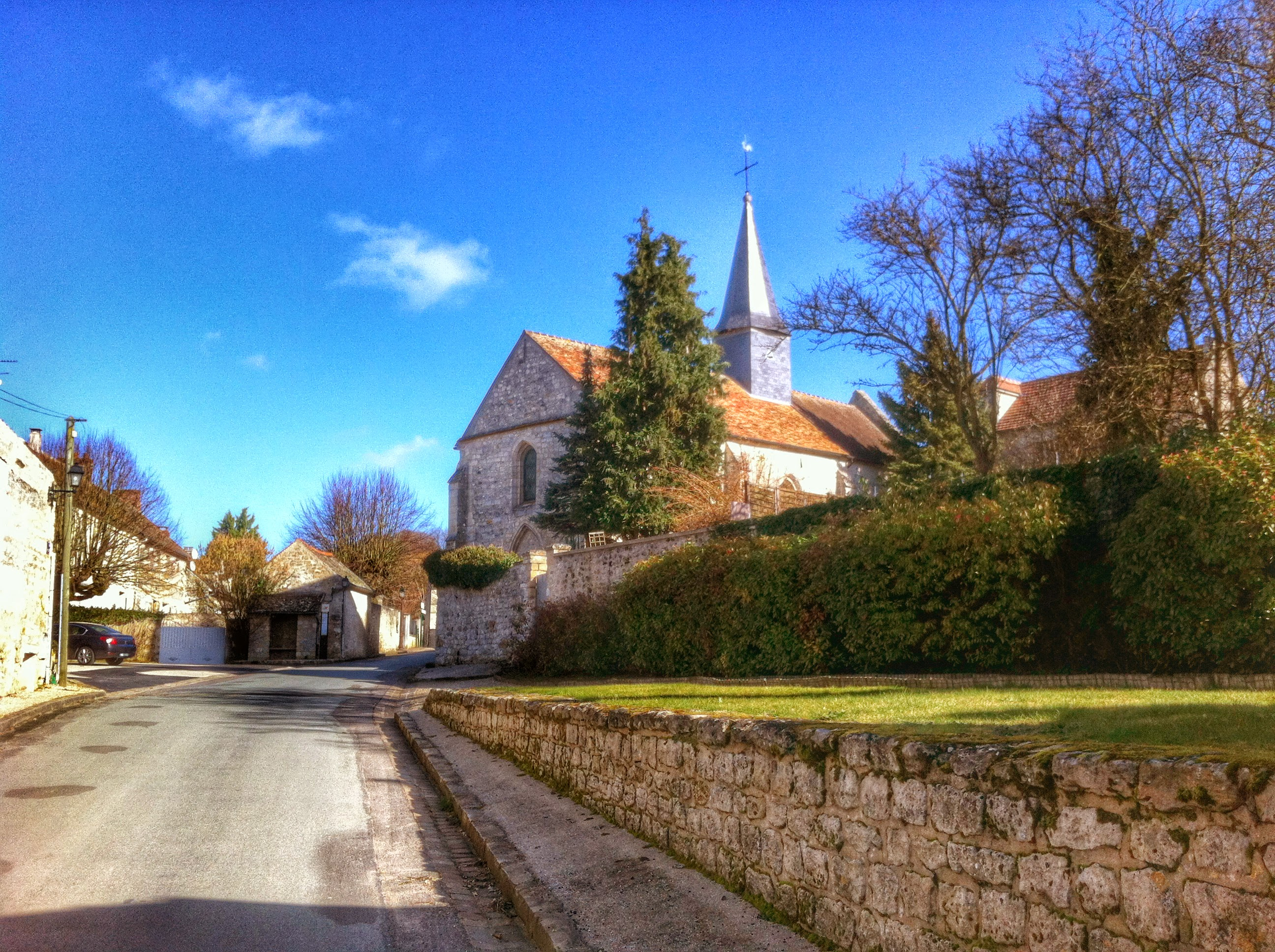
A view of the church of Hédouville

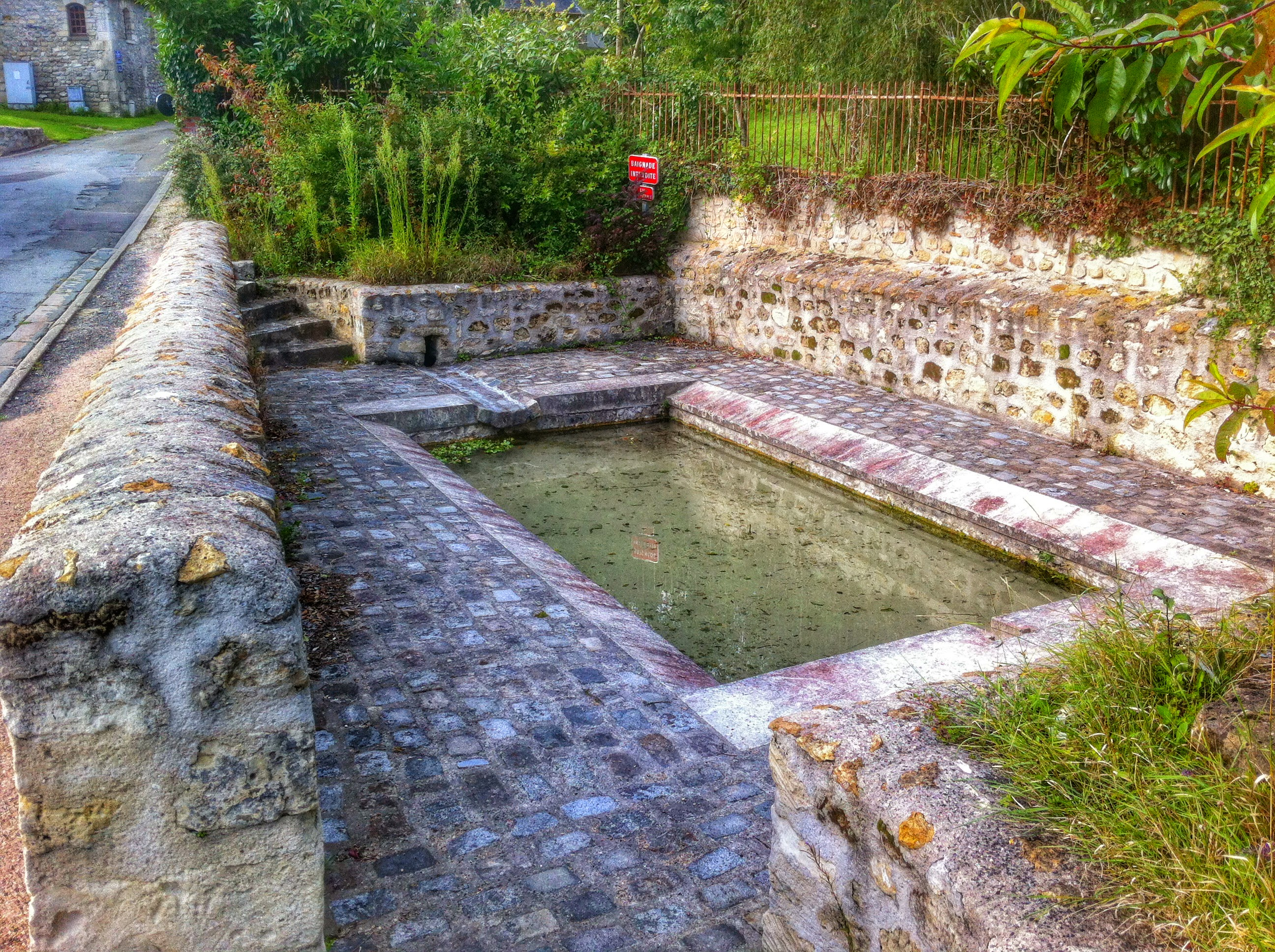
The washing place

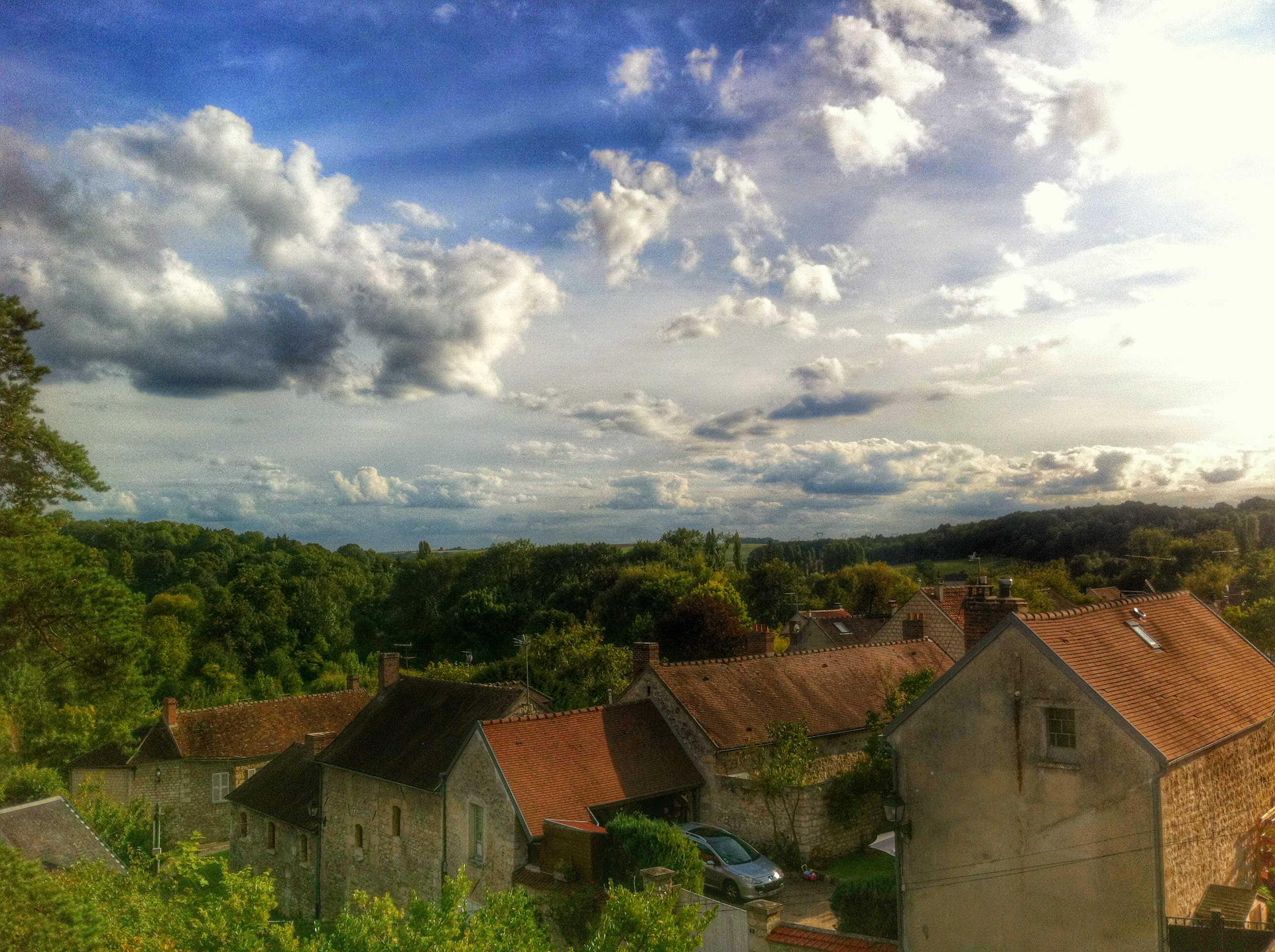
Looking south-west in the village

== See also ==
- Communes of the Val-d'Oise department
