= Champagne-sur-Oise station =

Railway station in Champagne-sur-Oise, France

Champagne-sur-Oise
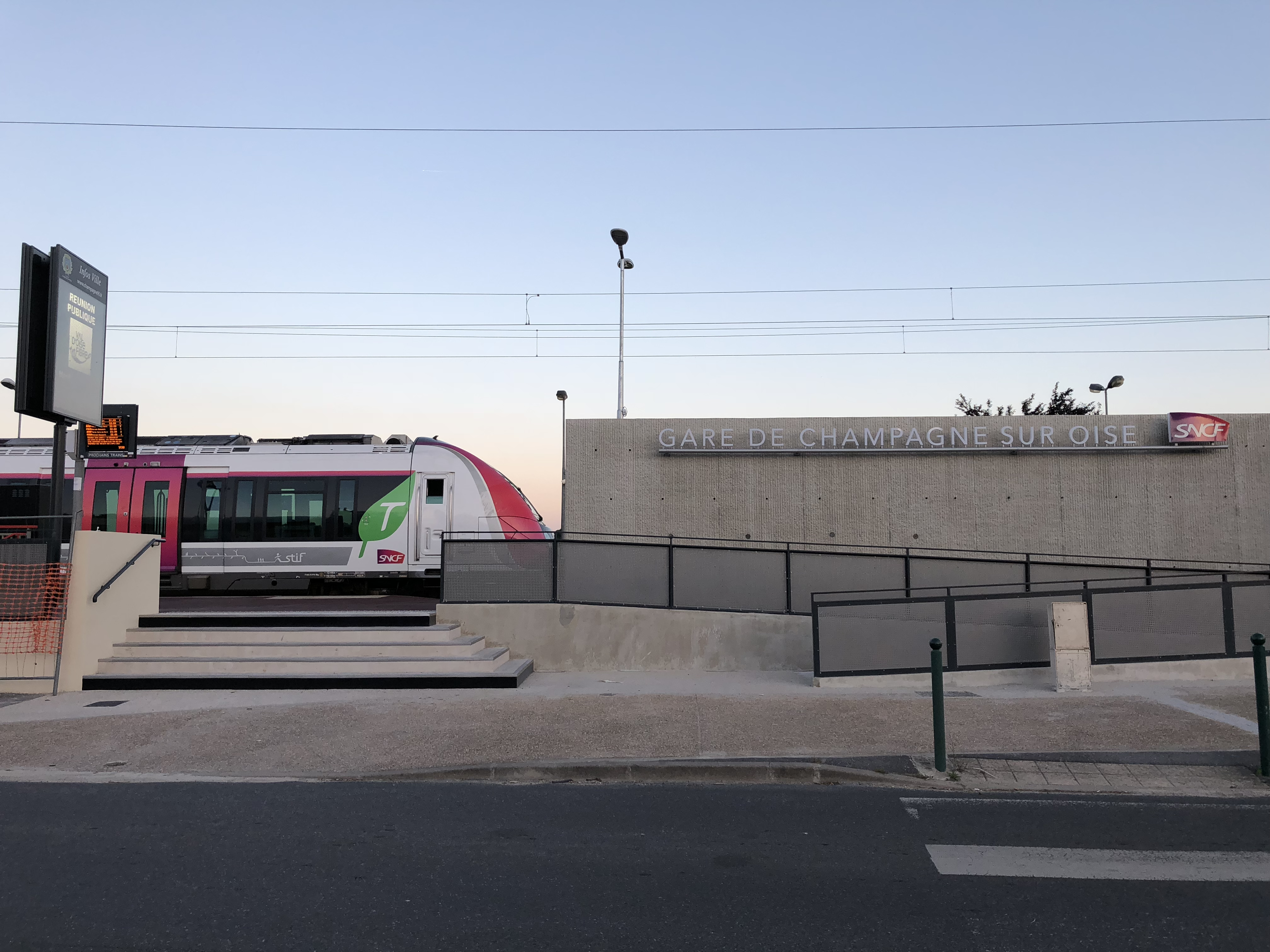

General information
- Location: Champagne-sur-Oise, France
- Coordinates: 49°8′9″N 2°14′32″E
- Owner: SNCF

Other information
- Station code: 87276519
- Fare zone: 5

Services
Preceding station	Transilien	Following station
L'Isle-Adam–Parmain towards Paris-Nord	Line H	Persan–Beaumont Terminus
L'Isle-Adam–Parmain towards Pontoise	Line H	Persan–Beaumont towards Creil
Location

Champagne-sur-Oise (French pronunciation: [ʃɑ̃paɲ syʁ waz]) is a railway station in the commune of Champagne-sur-Oise, Val-d'Oise department, France.

It is served by Transilien Line H on two of its branches : Creil ↔ Persan–Beaumont ↔ Pontoise and Paris-Nord ↔ Ermont–Eaubonne ↔ Persan–Beaumont. In 2019, the station's estimated annual passenger total was 342,276.

== Bus connections ==
- Haut Val-d'Oise : Haut Val-d'Oise: 1303

== See also ==
- List of SNCF stations in Île-de-France
