= Canton of Saint-Ouen-l'Aumône =

French canton

Coordinates: 49.04°N 2.11°E

The canton of Saint-Ouen-l'Aumône is an administrative division of the Val-d'Oise department, Île-de-France region, northern France. Its borders were modified at the French canton reorganisation which came into effect in March 2015. Its seat is in Saint-Ouen-l'Aumône.

It consists of the following communes:

1. Auvers-sur-Oise
2. Butry-sur-Oise
3. Frépillon
4. Frouville
5. Hédouville
6. Hérouville-en-Vexin
7. Labbeville
8. Mériel
9. Méry-sur-Oise
10. Nesles-la-Vallée
11. Saint-Ouen-l'Aumône
12. Valmondois
