= Valmondois station =

French railway station

Valmondois Butry-sur-Oise
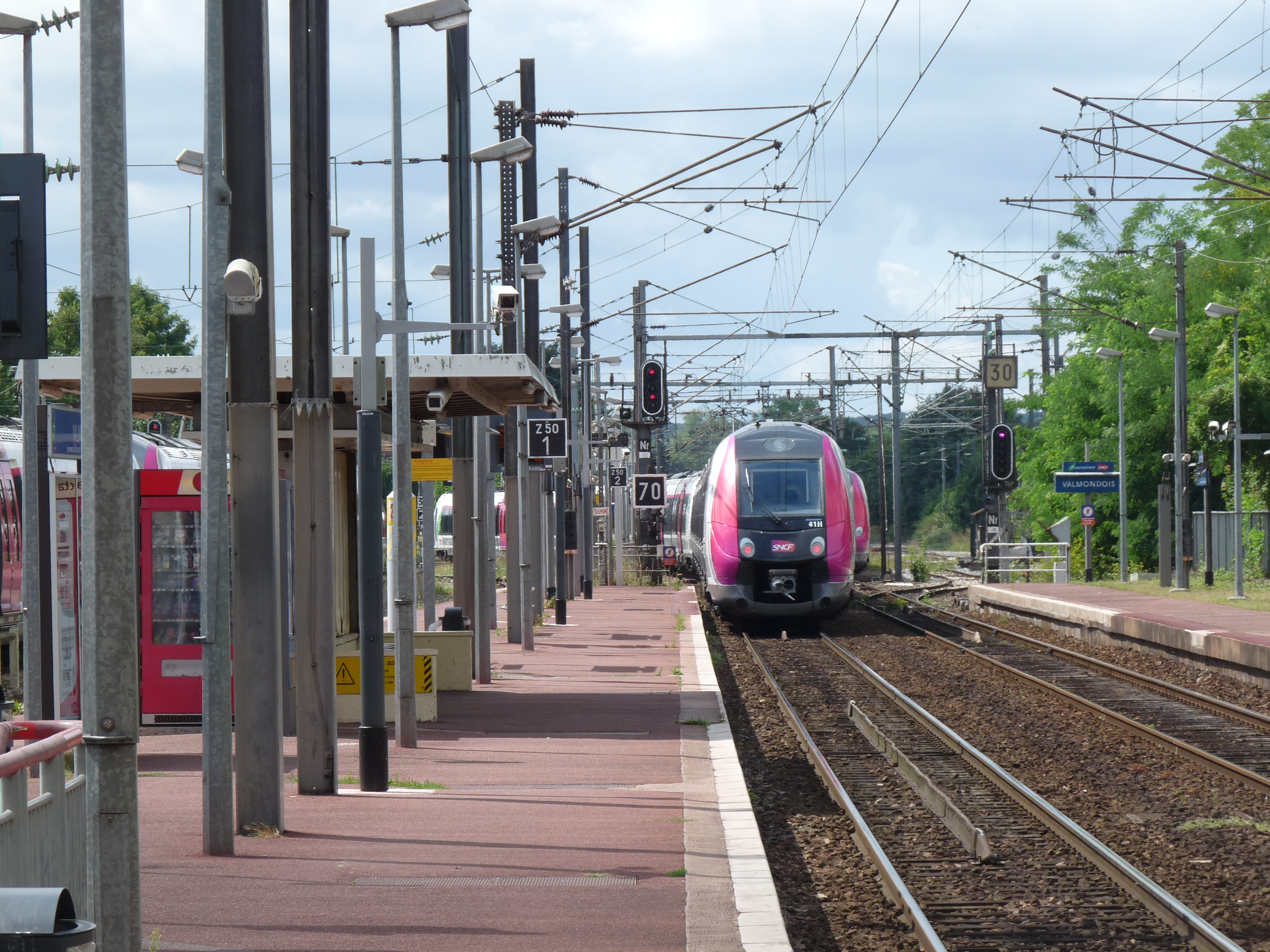
- Valmondois station

General information
- Location: Butry-sur-Oise, France
- Coordinates: 49°5′30″N 2°12′7″E
- Owner: SNCF

Other information
- Station code: 87276535
- Fare zone: 5

Services
Preceding station	Transilien	Following station
Mériel towards Paris-Nord	Line H	L'Isle-Adam–Parmain towards Persan–Beaumont
Auvers-sur-Oise towards Pontoise	Line H	L'Isle-Adam–Parmain towards Creil
Location

Valmondois (French pronunciation: [valmɔ̃dwa]) is a railway station located in the commune of Butry-sur-Oise, Val-d'Oise, France, on the border with Valmondois. The station is served by Transilien H trains Creil – Pontoise and Paris – Saint-Leu-la-Forêt – Persan-Beaumont. The daily number of passengers was between 500 and 2,500 in 2002.

== History ==
Valmondois is located on the original Paris - Lille line, opened on 20 June 1846 by Compagnie des chemins de fer du Nord (Nord Railway Company). This line passed along the Montmorency Valley (Ermont-Eaubonne), and headed towards the Northeast at Saint-Ouen-l'Aumône, continuing through the Oise valley.

In 1859, a more direct line along Chantilly was opened.

The Ermont-Eaubonne - Valmondois branch line via Saint-Leu-la-Forêt was opened in 1876.

Between 1886 and 1949, a branch line existed from Valmondois to Marines

The line Pontoise - Creil was electrified in 1969, the line Ermont-Eaubonne - Valmondois in December 1970.

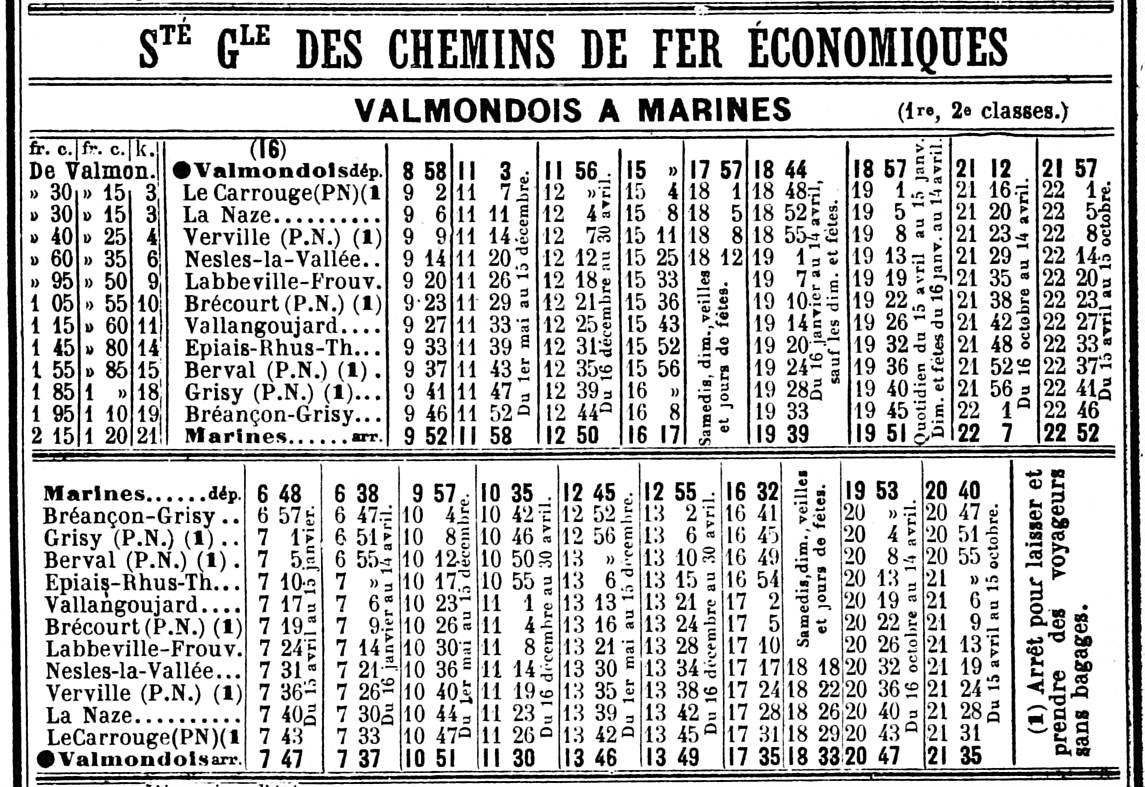
Timetables of Valmondois-Marines, in May 1914

== See also ==
- List of SNCF stations in Île-de-France
