= L'Isle-Adam–Parmain station =

Railway station in Parmain, France

L'Isle Adam–Parmain
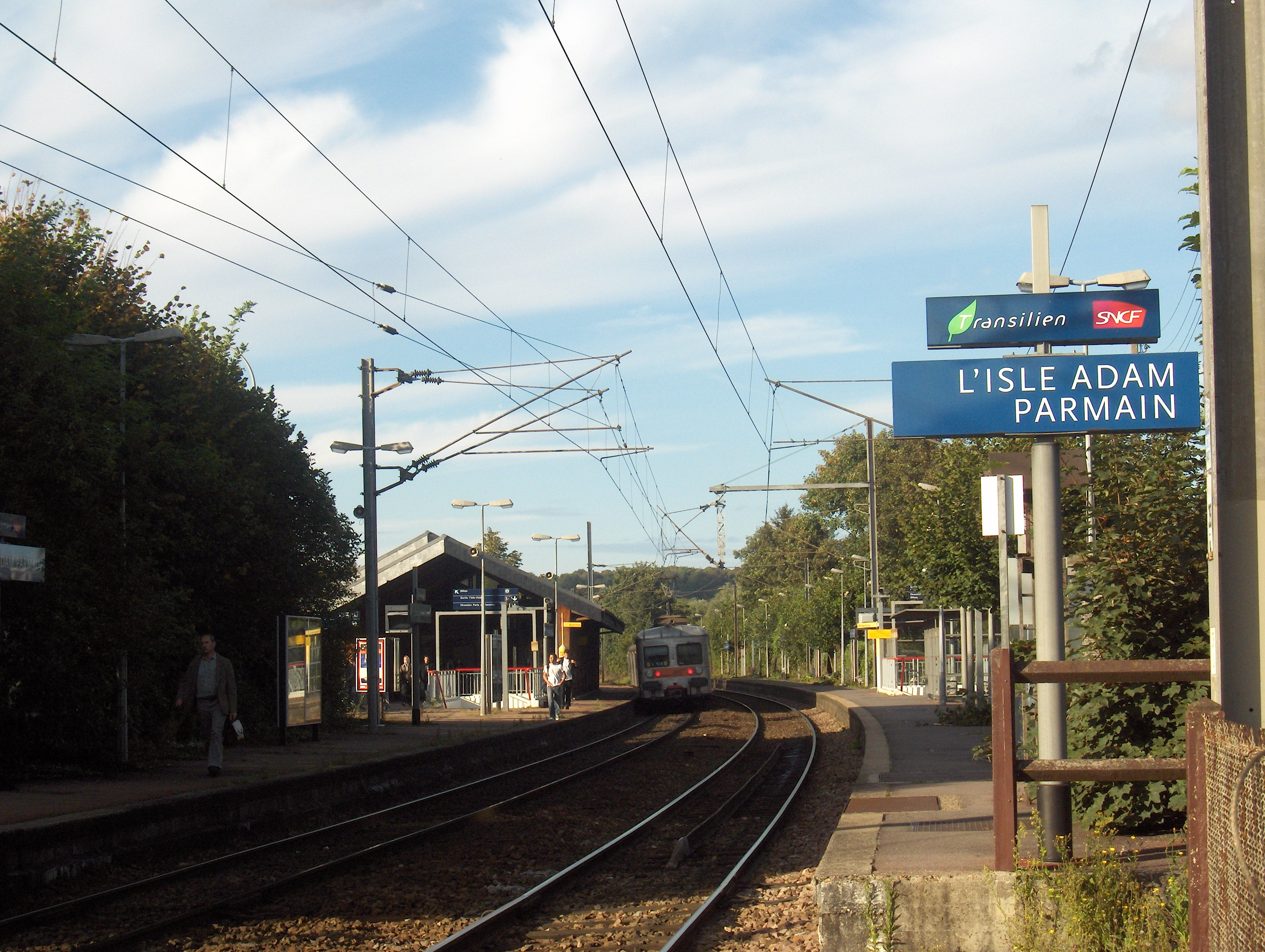

General information
- Location: Parmain, France
- Coordinates: 49°6′52″N 2°12′35″E
- Owner: SNCF
- Platforms: 2 platforms
- Tracks: 2 tracks

Other information
- Station code: 87276527
- Fare zone: 5

History
- Opened: 1846

Services
Preceding station	Transilien	Following station
Valmondois towards Paris-Nord	Line H	Champagne-sur-Oise towards Persan–Beaumont
Valmondois towards Pontoise	Line H	Champagne-sur-Oise towards Creil
Location

L'Isle-Adam–Parmain is a railway station in the commune of Parmain (Val-d'Oise department), France. The station is served by two Transilien H lines: Creil–Pontoise and Paris–Saint-Leu-la-Forêt–Persan-Beaumont. The daily number of passengers was between 500 and 2,500 in 2002.

== Bus connections ==
- Vexin : 95.07
- Haut Val-d'Oise : Haut Val-d'Oise: 1303

== See also ==
- List of SNCF stations in Île-de-France
