= Mériel station =

French rail station

Mériel
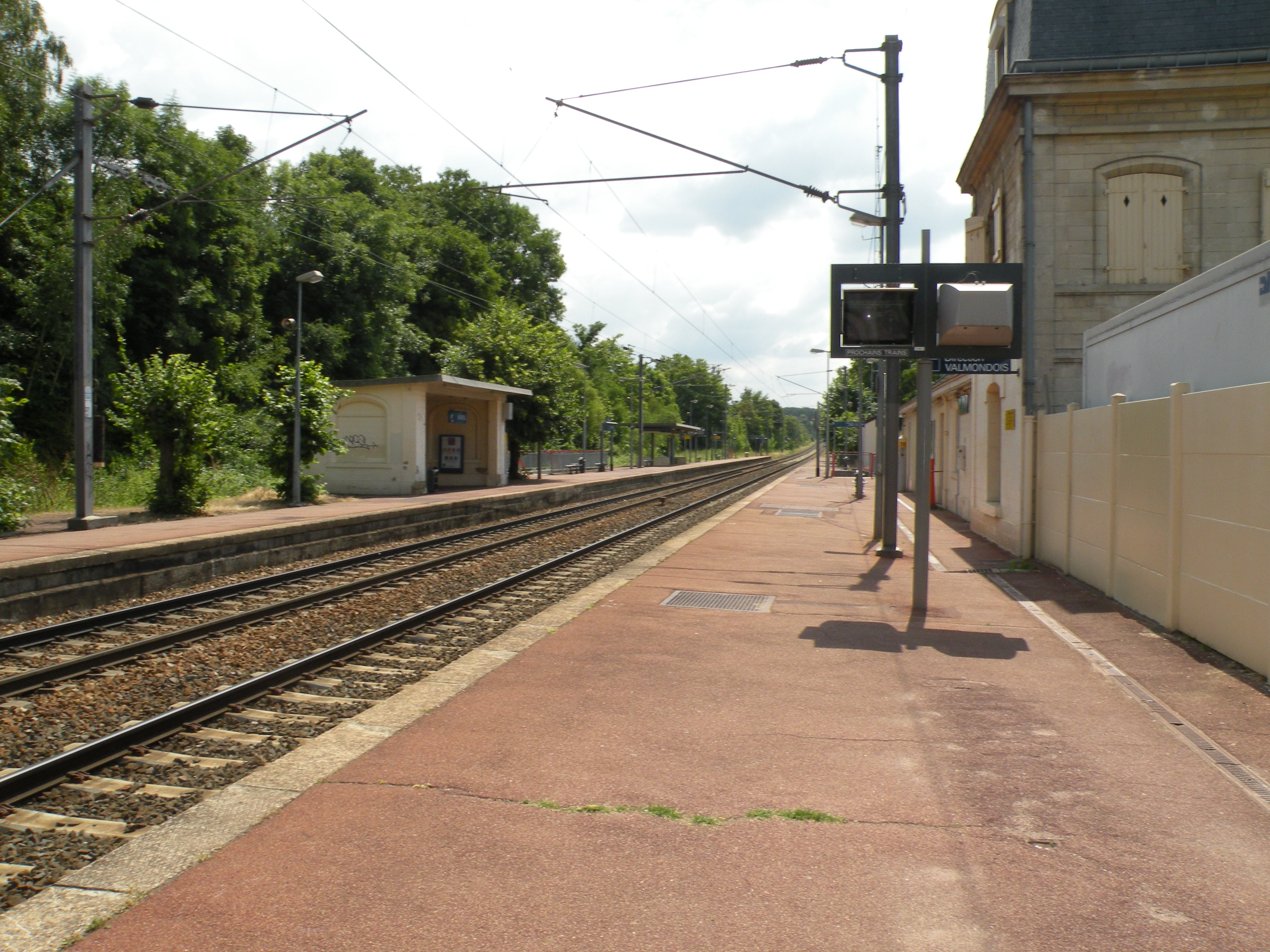
- The platform, view towards Paris

General information
- Location: Mériel, France
- Coordinates: 49°4′40″N 2°12′20″E
- Owner: SNCF
- Platforms: 2 platforms and 2 walkways

Other information
- Station code: 87276675
- Fare zone: 5

History
- Opened: 1876

Services
Preceding station	Transilien	Following station
Méry-sur-Oise towards Paris-Nord	Line H	Valmondois towards Persan–Beaumont
Location

Mériel is a rail station in the commune of Mériel (Val-d'Oise department), France. The station is served by Transilien H trains from Paris to Persan-Beaumont via Saint-Leu-la-Forêt. The daily number of passengers was less than 500 in 2002. Mériel is located on the line from Ermont-Eaubonne to Valmondois, that was opened in 1876. The line was electrified in 1970.

== Bus connections ==
- Busval d'Oise: 95.09
- Valoise: 30.25 and 30.29

== See also ==
- List of SNCF stations in Île-de-France
