= Frouville =

- Commune
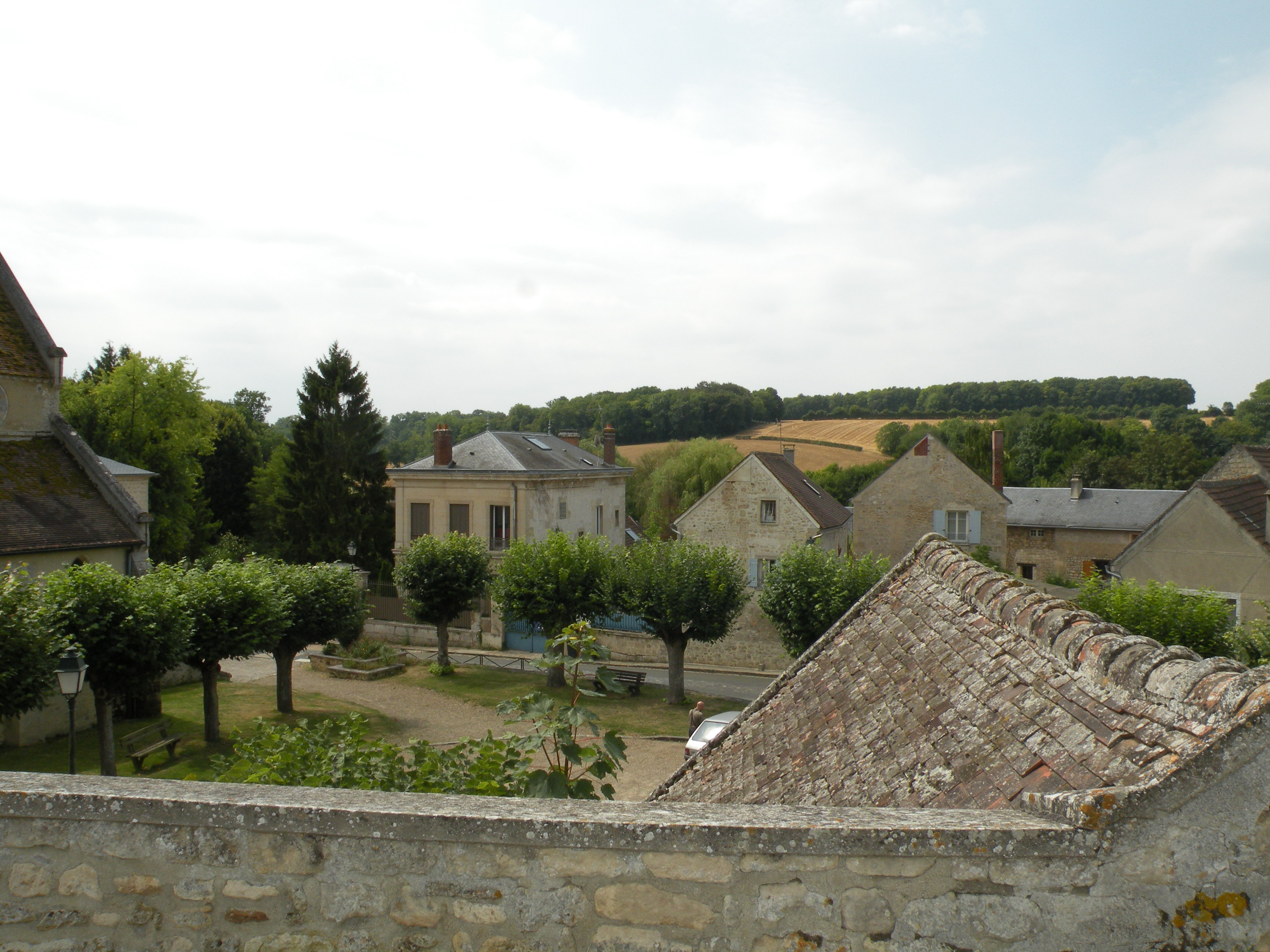
- A general view of Frouville
- Location of Frouville
- Location within France Location within Île-de-France (region)
- Coordinates: 49°09′00″N 2°09′02″E
- Country: France
- Region: Île-de-France
- Department: Val-d'Oise
- Arrondissement: Pontoise
- Canton: Saint-Ouen-l'Aumône

Government
  - Mayor (2020–2026): Stéphan Lazaroff
- Area^{1}: 7.60 km^{2} (2.93 sq mi)
- Highest elevation: 126 m (413 ft)
- Lowest elevation: 39 m (128 ft)
- Population (2023): 347
  - Density: 45.7/km^{2} (118/sq mi)
- Time zone: UTC+01:00 (CET)
  - Summer (DST): UTC+02:00 (CEST)
- INSEE/Postal code: 95258 /95690
- ^{1} French Land Register data, which excludes lakes, ponds, glaciers > 1 km^{2} (0.386 sq mi or 247 acres) and river estuaries.

Frouville (French pronunciation: [fʁuvil]) is a commune in the Val-d'Oise department in Île-de-France in northern France.

== See also ==
- Communes of the Val-d'Oise department
