= Parmain =

- Commune
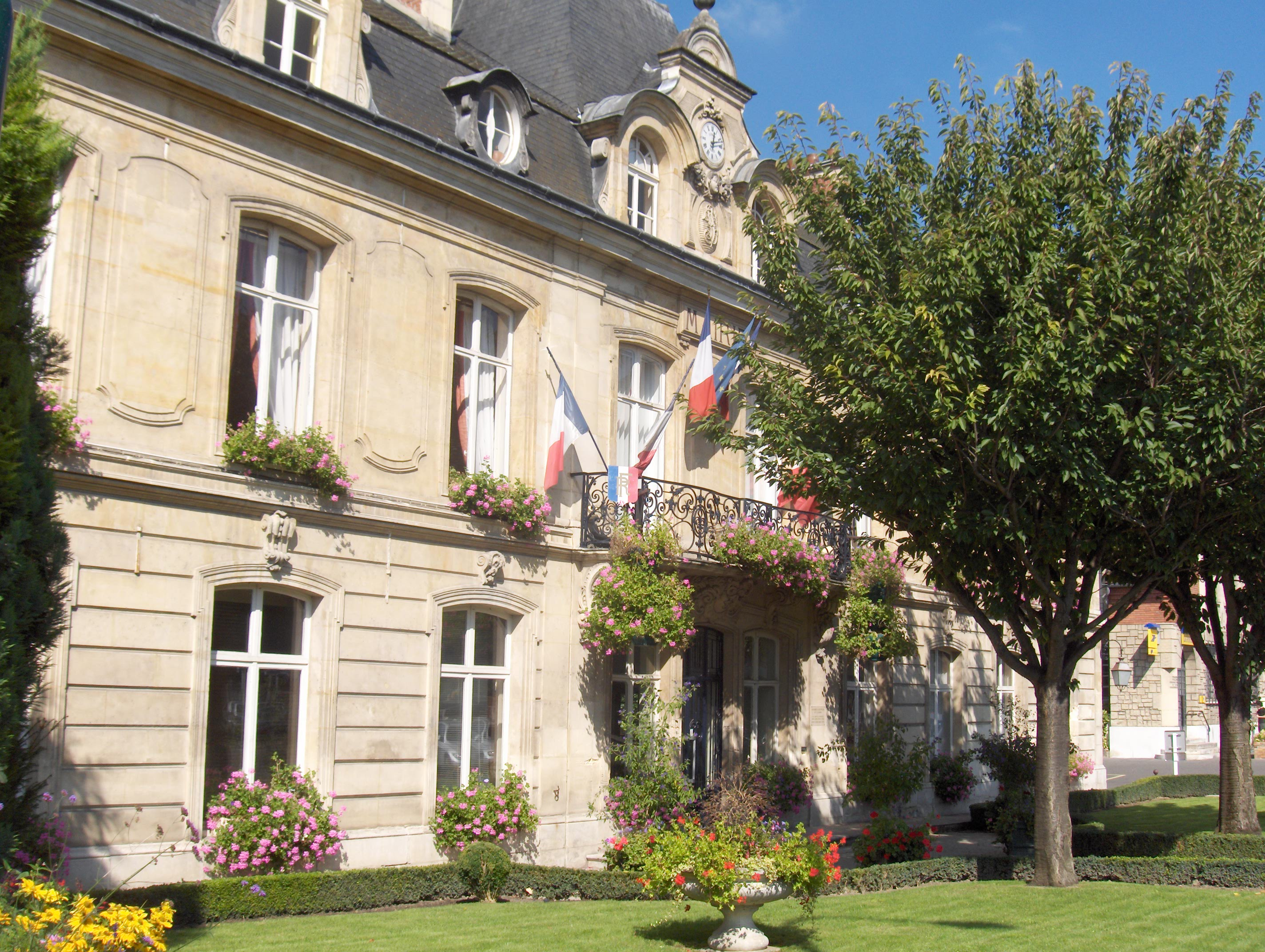
- The town hall of Parmain

- Coat of arms
- Location of Parmain
- Location within France Location within Île-de-France (region)
- Coordinates: 49°06′55″N 2°12′34″E
- Country: France
- Region: Île-de-France
- Department: Val-d'Oise
- Arrondissement: Pontoise
- Canton: L'Isle-Adam
- Intercommunality: Vallée de l'Oise et des Trois forêts

Government
  - Mayor (2020–2026): Loïc Taillanter
- Area^{1}: 9.20 km^{2} (3.55 sq mi)
- Highest elevation: 146 m (479 ft)
- Lowest elevation: 24 m (79 ft)
- Population (2023): 5,655
  - Density: 615/km^{2} (1,590/sq mi)
- Time zone: UTC+01:00 (CET)
  - Summer (DST): UTC+02:00 (CEST)
- INSEE/Postal code: 95480 /95620
- ^{1} French Land Register data, which excludes lakes, ponds, glaciers > 1 km^{2} (0.386 sq mi or 247 acres) and river estuaries.

Parmain (French pronunciation: [paʁmɛ̃]) is a commune in the Val-d'Oise department in Île-de-France in northern France. L'Isle-Adam–Parmain station has rail connections to Persan, Creil, Pontoise and Paris.

== Population ==
Historical population
Year	Pop.	±% p.a.
1968	2,406	—
1975	3,443	+5.25%
1982	4,561	+4.10%
1990	5,155	+1.54%
1999	5,274	+0.25%
2007	5,462	+0.44%
2012	5,547	+0.31%
2017	5,549	+0.01%
2023	5,655	+0.32%
Source: INSEE

== See also ==
- Communes of the Val-d'Oise department
