= Méry-sur-Oise =

- Commune
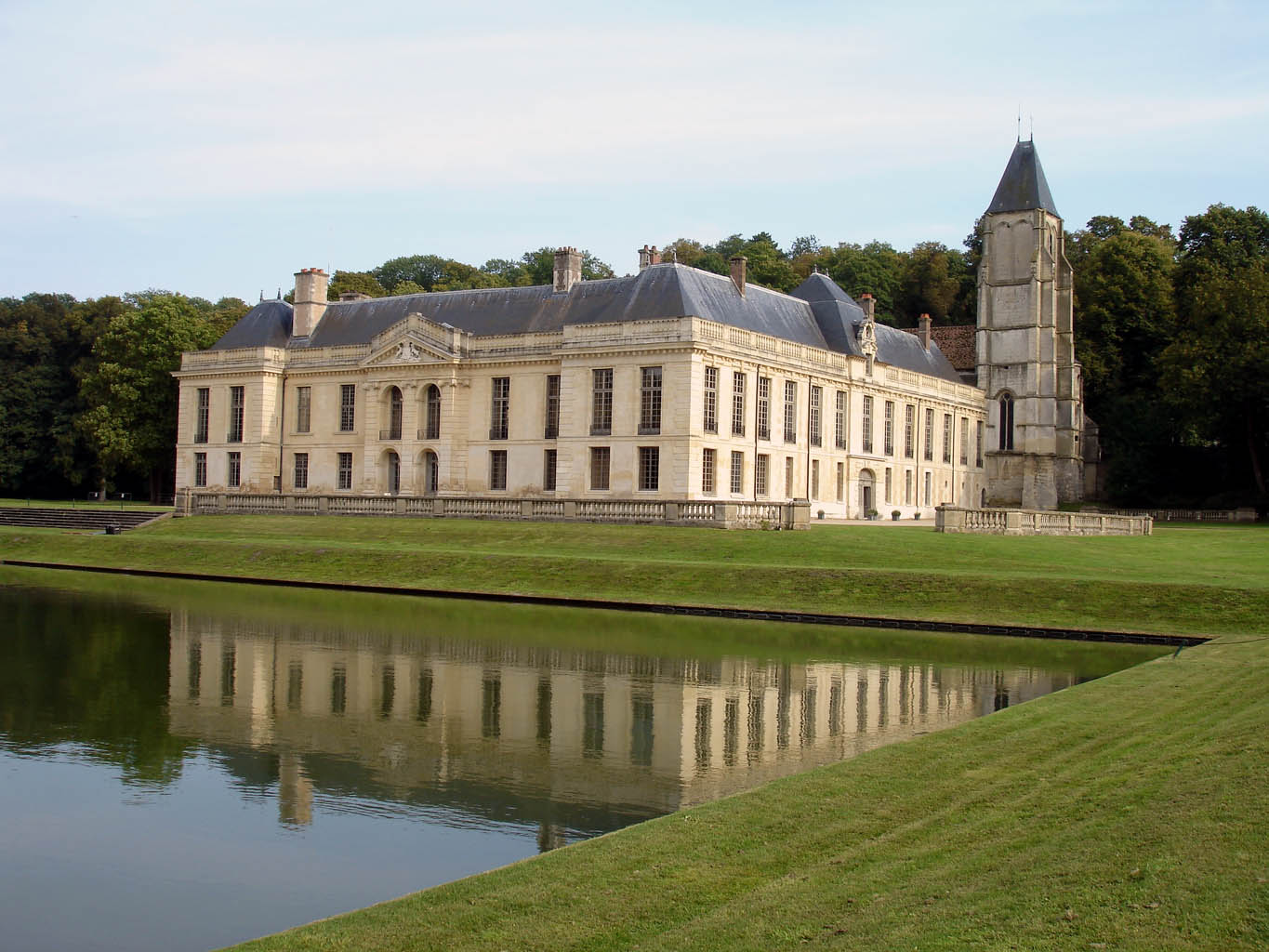
- Château de Méry
- Location of Méry-sur-Oise
- Location within France Location within Île-de-France (region)
- Coordinates: 49°03′52″N 2°11′14″E
- Country: France
- Region: Île-de-France
- Department: Val-d'Oise
- Arrondissement: Pontoise
- Canton: Saint-Ouen-l'Aumône
- Intercommunality: CC de la Vallée de l'Oise et des Trois Forêts

Government
  - Mayor (2020–2026): Pierre-Édouard Eon
- Area^{1}: 11.17 km^{2} (4.31 sq mi)
- Highest elevation: 96 m (315 ft)
- Lowest elevation: 22 m (72 ft)
- Population (2023): 9,983
  - Density: 893.7/km^{2} (2,315/sq mi)
- Demonym: Mérysiens
- Time zone: UTC+01:00 (CET)
  - Summer (DST): UTC+02:00 (CEST)
- INSEE/Postal code: 95394 /95540
- Website: www.merysuroise.fr
- ^{1} French Land Register data, which excludes lakes, ponds, glaciers > 1 km^{2} (0.386 sq mi or 247 acres) and river estuaries.

Méry-sur-Oise (French pronunciation: [meʁi syʁ waz]; lit. 'Méry-on-Oise') is a commune in the Val-d'Oise department in Île-de-France in northern France. Méry-sur-Oise station has rail connections to Persan, Saint-Leu-la-Forêt and Paris.

== Population ==
Historical population
Year	Pop.	±% p.a.
1968	3,469	—
1975	4,708	+4.46%
1982	5,741	+2.87%
1990	6,179	+0.92%
1999	8,929	+4.18%
2007	9,190	+0.36%
2012	9,320	+0.28%
2017	9,892	+1.20%
2023	9,983	+0.15%
Source: INSEE

== See also ==
- Communes of the Val-d'Oise department
