= Mériel =

- Commune
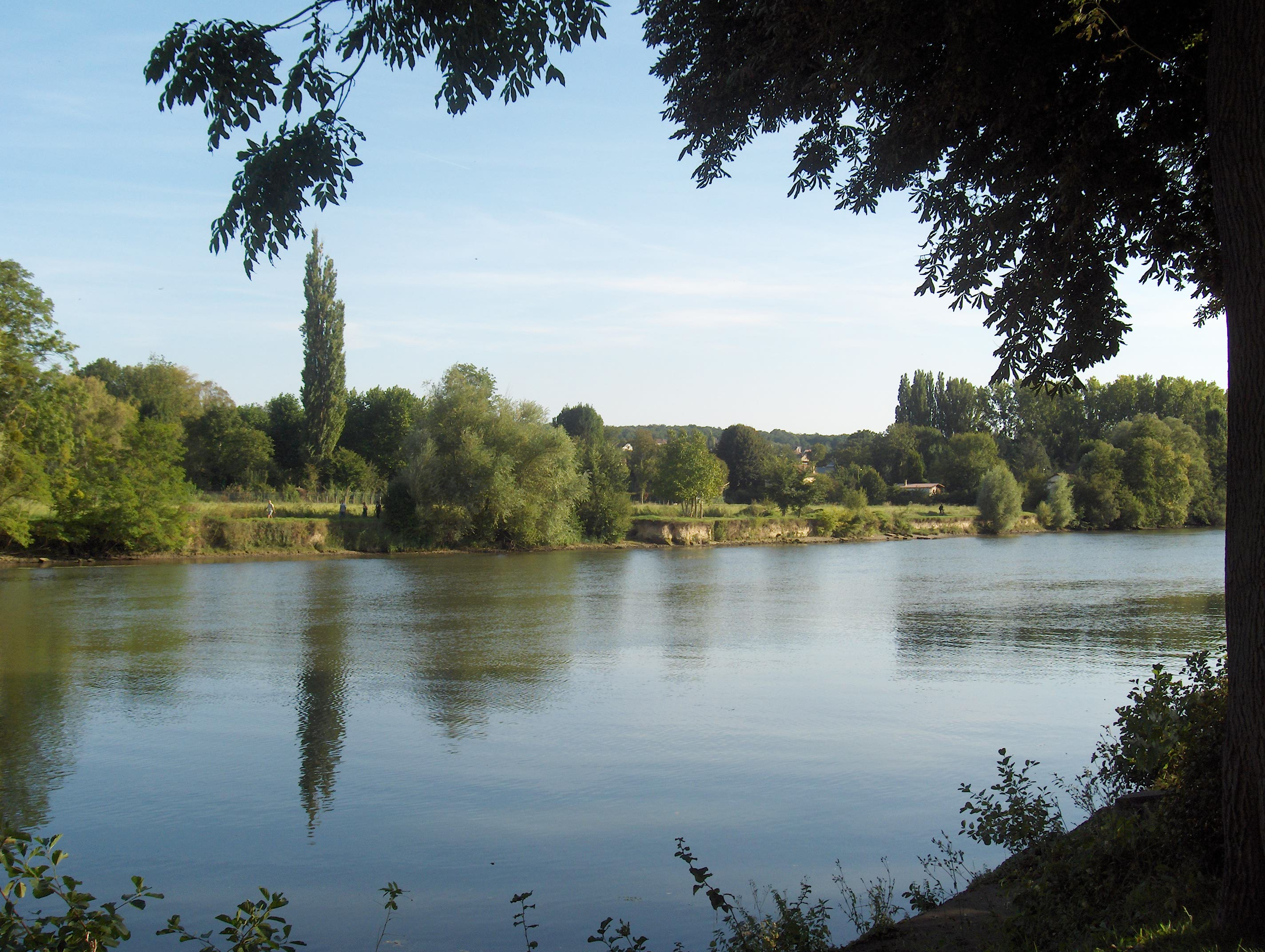
- The River Oise near Mériel

- Coat of arms
- Location of Mériel
- Location within France Location within Île-de-France (region)
- Coordinates: 49°04′48″N 2°12′21″E
- Country: France
- Region: Île-de-France
- Department: Val-d'Oise
- Arrondissement: Pontoise
- Canton: Saint-Ouen-l'Aumône
- Intercommunality: Vallée de l'Oise et des Trois Forêts

Government
  - Mayor (2020–2026): Jérôme François
- Area^{1}: 5.31 km^{2} (2.05 sq mi)
- Highest elevation: 95 m (312 ft)
- Lowest elevation: 22 m (72 ft)
- Population (2023): 5,347
  - Density: 1,010/km^{2} (2,610/sq mi)
- Time zone: UTC+01:00 (CET)
  - Summer (DST): UTC+02:00 (CEST)
- INSEE/Postal code: 95392 /95630
- ^{1} French Land Register data, which excludes lakes, ponds, glaciers > 1 km^{2} (0.386 sq mi or 247 acres) and river estuaries.

Mériel (French pronunciation: [meʁjɛl]) is a commune in the Val-d'Oise department and Île-de-France region of France. Mériel station has rail connections to Persan, Saint-Leu-la-Forêt and Paris.

== Population ==
Historical population
Year	Pop.	±% p.a.
1968	2,436	—
1975	3,115	+3.57%
1982	3,351	+1.05%
1990	3,985	+2.19%
1999	4,062	+0.21%
2007	4,370	+0.92%
2012	4,765	+1.75%
2017	5,083	+1.30%
2023	5,347	+0.85%
Source: INSEE

== Notable residents ==
- Jean Gabin, actor (1904–1976). Gabin spent his childhood in Mériel where a museum has been dedicated to his life and work.
- Fernand Braudel, historian (1902–1985).
- Pavlos Pavlidis, musician and poet (resided from 1980 to 1992). Famous for being the singer, lyricist and guitarist for the band Τα Ξύλινα Σπαθιά.

== Town twinning ==
Mériel is twinned with:

- (United Kingdom) Llanwrtyd Wells in Wales

== See also ==
- Communes of the Val-d'Oise department
