= Méry-sur-Oise station =

French railway station

Méry-sur-Oise
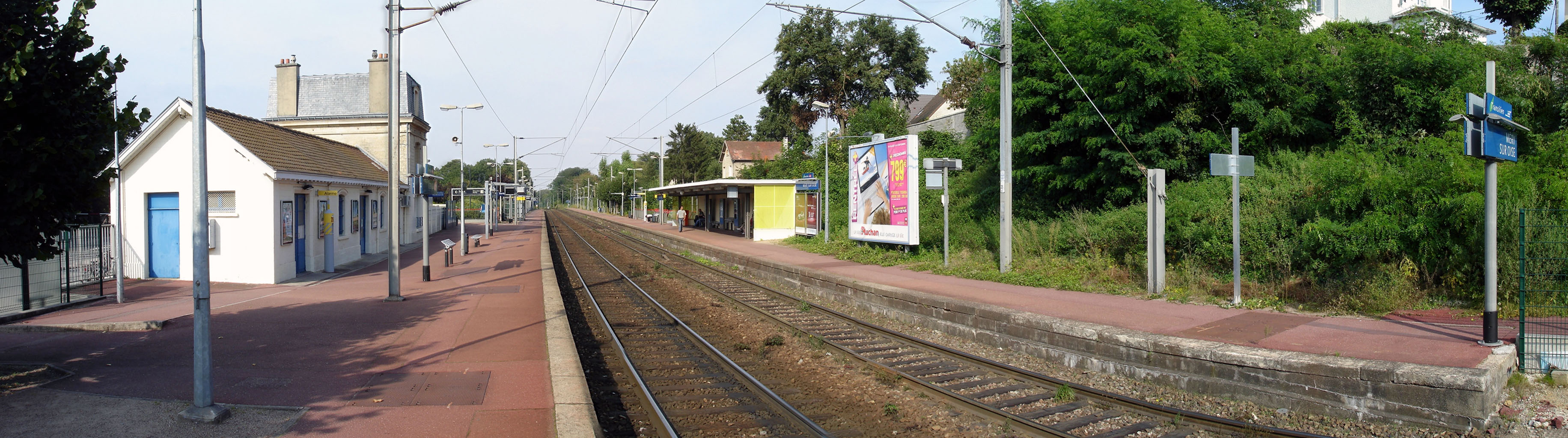

General information
- Location: Méry-sur-Oise, France
- Coordinates: 49°3′28″N 2°11′27″E
- Owner: SNCF
- Platforms: 2 platforms and 2 walkways

Other information
- Station code: 87276667
- Fare zone: 5

History
- Opened: 1876

Services
Preceding station	Transilien	Following station
Frépillon towards Paris-Nord	Line H	Mériel towards Persan–Beaumont
Location

Méry-sur-Oise (French pronunciation: [meʁi syʁ waz]) is a railway station in the commune of Méry-sur-Oise, Val-d'Oise department, France. The station is served by Transilien H trains, on the line from Paris to Persan-Beaumont via Saint-Leu-la-Forêt. The daily number of passengers was between 500 and 2,500 in 2002. Méry-sur-Oise is located on the line from Ermont-Eaubonne to Valmondois, that was opened in 1876. The line was electrified in 1970.

== Bus connections ==
- STIVO: 56
- Valoise: 30.29
- Busval d'Oise: 95.17

== Photos ==
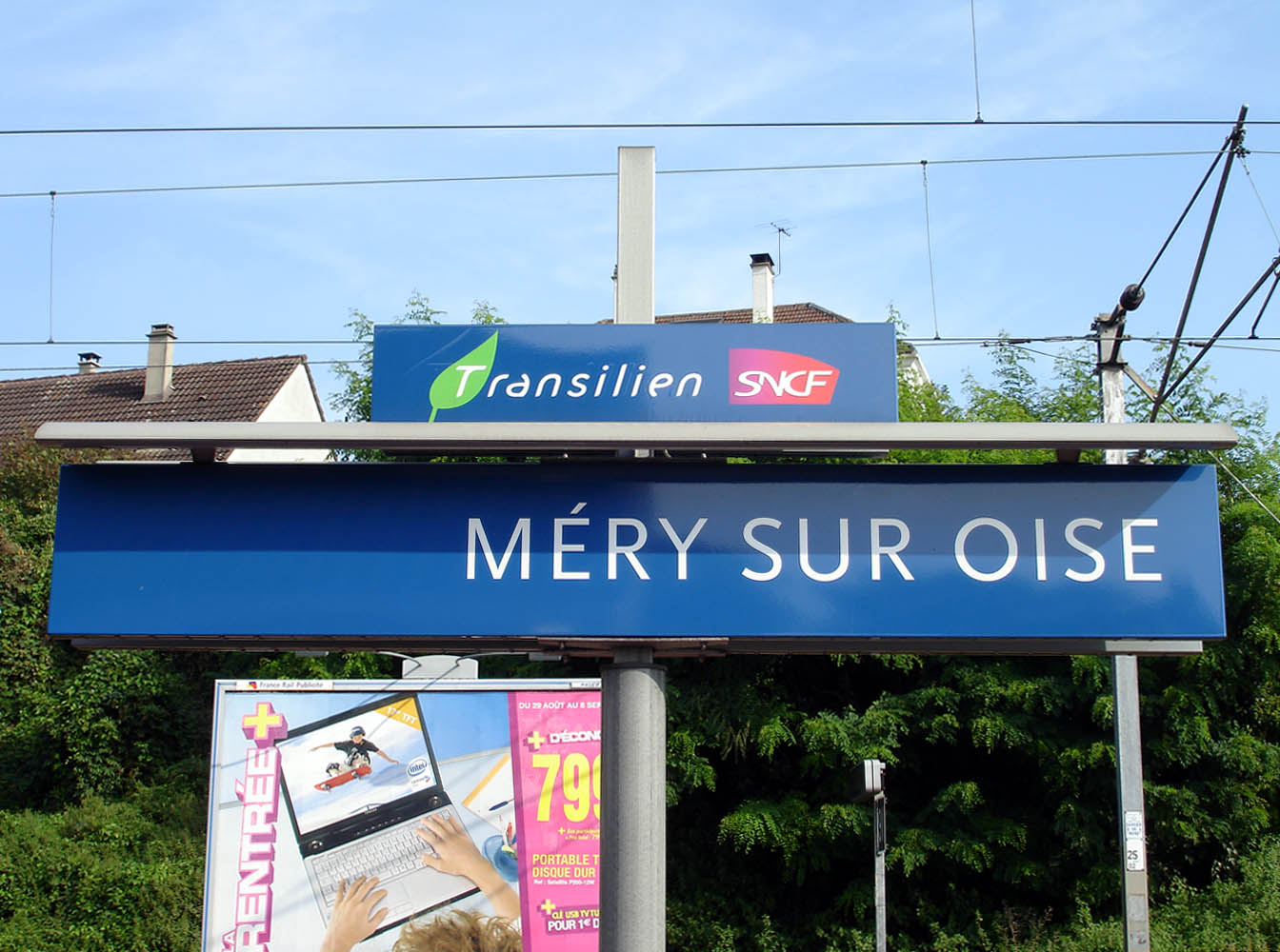

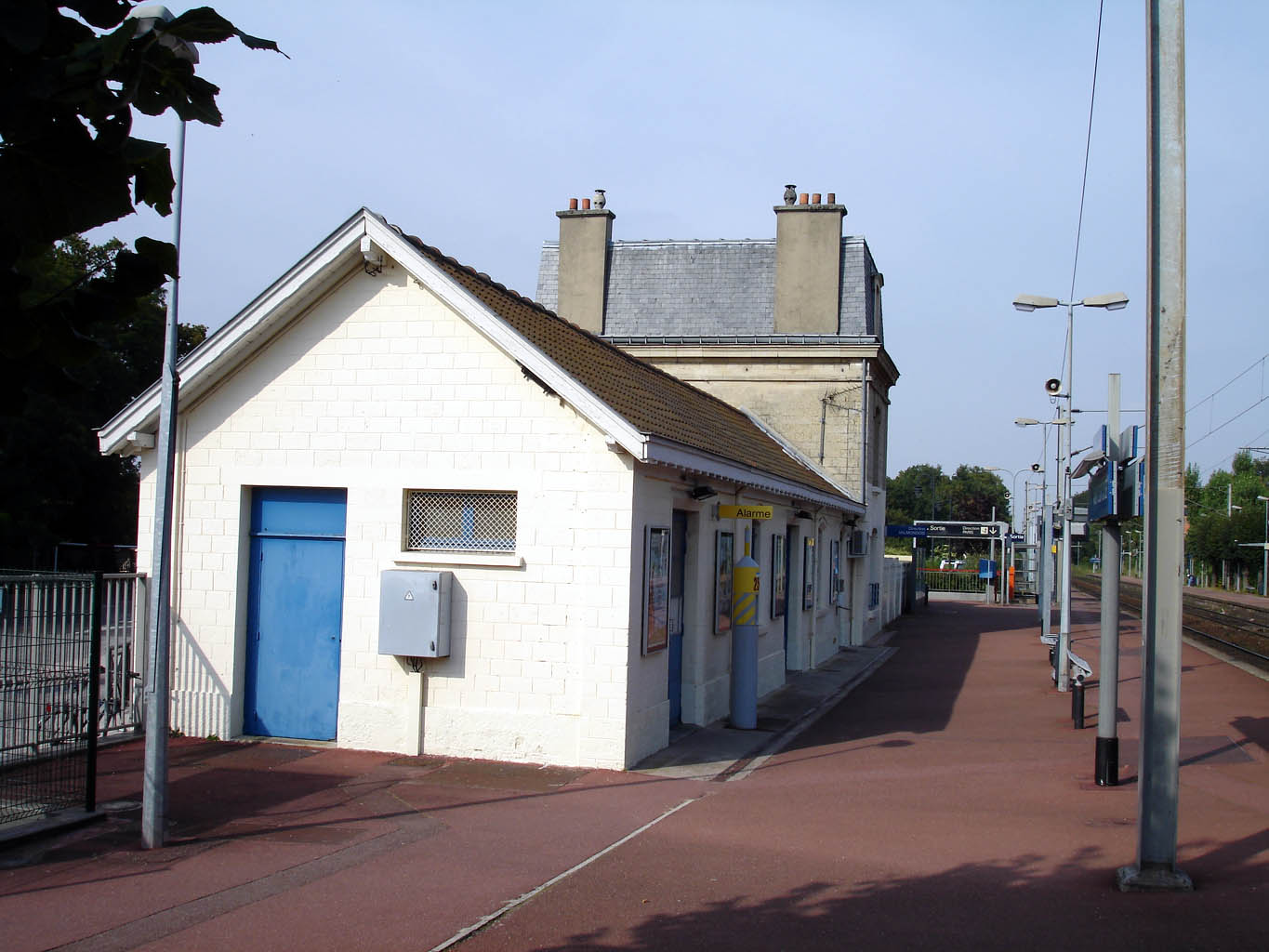

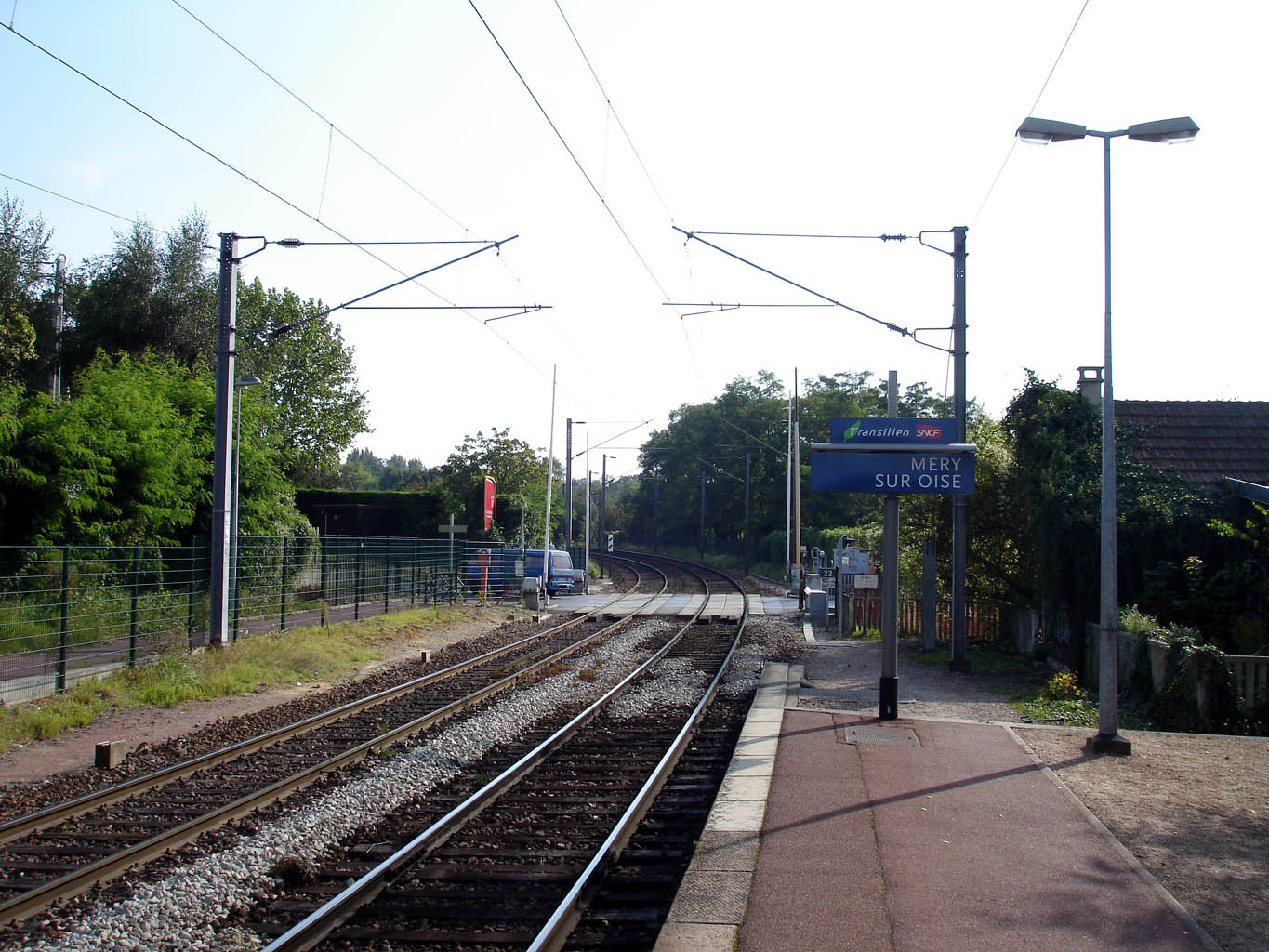

== See also ==
- List of SNCF stations in Île-de-France
