= Butry-sur-Oise =

- Commune
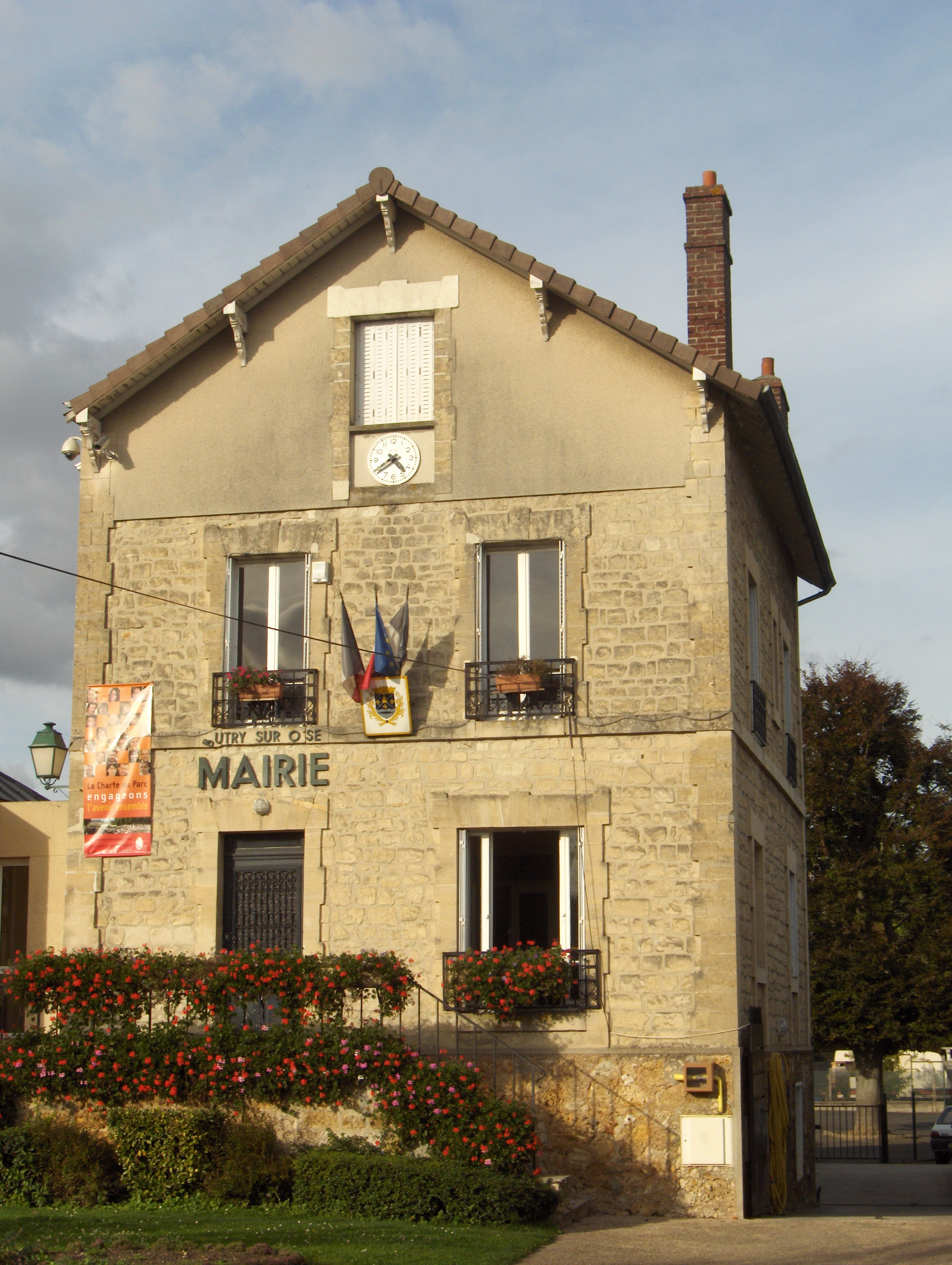
- The town hall of Butry-sur-Oise

- Coat of arms
- Location of Butry-sur-Oise
- Location within France Location within Île-de-France (region)
- Coordinates: 49°05′13″N 2°11′57″E
- Country: France
- Region: Île-de-France
- Department: Val-d'Oise
- Arrondissement: Pontoise
- Canton: Saint-Ouen-l'Aumône
- Intercommunality: CC Sausseron Impressionnistes

Government
  - Mayor (2020–2026): Claude Noël
- Area^{1}: 2.60 km^{2} (1.00 sq mi)
- Highest elevation: 96 m (315 ft)
- Lowest elevation: 22 m (72 ft)
- Population (2023): 2,252
  - Density: 866/km^{2} (2,240/sq mi)
- Demonym: Butryots
- Time zone: UTC+01:00 (CET)
  - Summer (DST): UTC+02:00 (CEST)
- INSEE/Postal code: 95120 /95430
- Website: butrysuroise.fr
- ^{1} French Land Register data, which excludes lakes, ponds, glaciers > 1 km^{2} (0.386 sq mi or 247 acres) and river estuaries.

Butry-sur-Oise (French pronunciation: [bytʁi syʁ waz]; lit. 'Butry-on-Oise') is a commune in the Val-d'Oise department in Île-de-France in northern France.

Despite its name, Valmondois station is situated in the commune; it has rail connections to Persan, Creil, Pontoise and Paris (at Paris-Nord).

== Population ==
Historical population
Year	Pop.	±% p.a.
1968	883	—
1975	997	+1.75%
1982	1,646	+7.42%
1990	1,878	+1.66%
1999	1,969	+0.53%
2007	1,974	+0.03%
2012	2,213	+2.31%
2017	2,272	+0.53%
2023	2,252	−0.15%
Source: INSEE

== Local attractions ==
- Musée des tramways à vapeur et des chemins de fer secondaires français

== See also ==
- Communes of the Val-d'Oise department
