= Crèvecœur-le-Grand =

- Commune
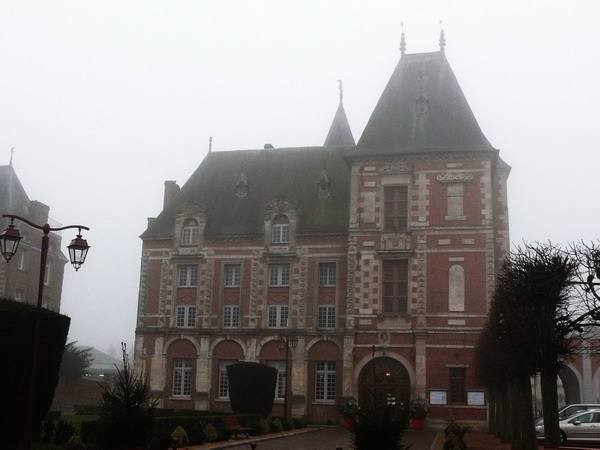
- The town hall in Crèvecœur-le-Grand

- Coat of arms
- Location of Crèvecœur-le-Grand
- Location within France Location within Hauts-de-France
- Coordinates: 49°36′32″N 2°04′44″E
- Country: France
- Region: Hauts-de-France
- Department: Oise
- Arrondissement: Beauvais
- Canton: Saint-Just-en-Chaussée
- Intercommunality: CA Beauvaisis

Government
  - Mayor (2020–2026): Aymeric Bourleau
- Area^{1}: 12.3 km^{2} (4.7 sq mi)
- Elevation: 176 m (577 ft)
- Highest elevation: 179 m (587 ft)
- Lowest elevation: 114 m (374 ft)
- Population (2023): 3,462
  - Density: 281/km^{2} (729/sq mi)
- Time zone: UTC+01:00 (CET)
  - Summer (DST): UTC+02:00 (CEST)
- INSEE/Postal code: 60178 /60360
- ^{1} French Land Register data, which excludes lakes, ponds, glaciers > 1 km^{2} (0.386 sq mi or 247 acres) and river estuaries.

Crèvecœur-le-Grand (French pronunciation: [kʁɛvkœʁ lə ɡʁɑ̃]) is a commune in the Oise department in northern France.

== Population ==
Historical population
| Year | Pop. | ±% p.a. |
|---|---|---|
| 1968 | 2,652 | — |
| 1975 | 2,868 | +1.12% |
| 1982 | 2,922 | +0.27% |
| 1990 | 2,996 | +0.31% |
| 1999 | 3,076 | +0.29% |
| 2007 | 3,334 | +1.01% |
| 2012 | 3,472 | +0.81% |
| 2017 | 3,535 | +0.36% |
| 2023 | 3,462 | −0.35% |
Source: INSEE

== See also ==
- Communes of the Oise department
