= Persan =

- Commune
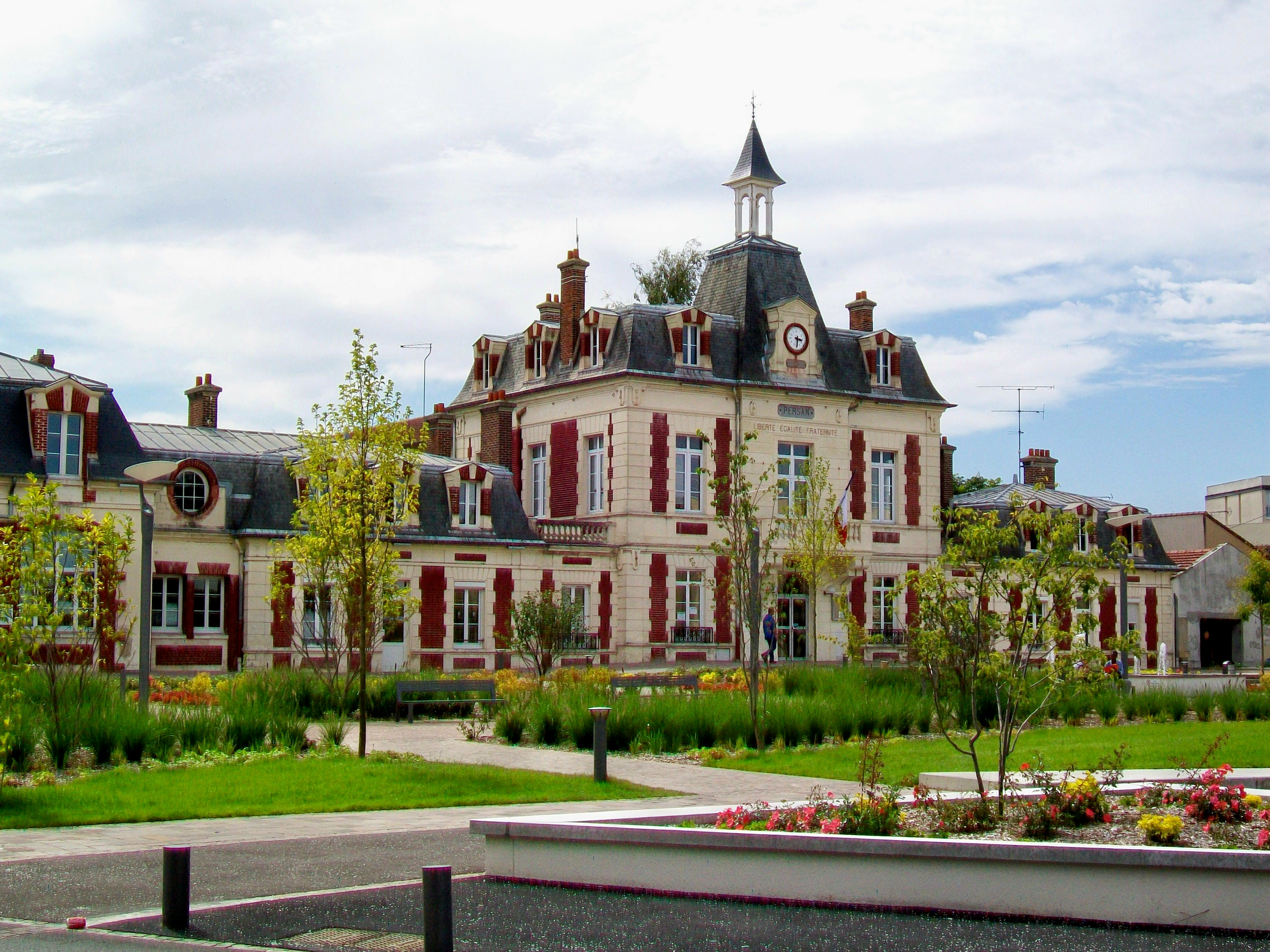
- The town hall of Persan

- Coat of arms
- Location of Persan
- Location within France Location within Île-de-France (region)
- Coordinates: 49°09′15″N 2°16′19″E
- Country: France
- Region: Île-de-France
- Department: Val-d'Oise
- Arrondissement: Pontoise
- Canton: L'Isle-Adam
- Intercommunality: Haut Val-d’Oise

Government
  - Mayor (2022–2026): Valentin Ratieuville
- Area^{1}: 5.14 km^{2} (1.98 sq mi)
- Elevation: 26 m (85 ft)
- Highest elevation: 55 m (180 ft)
- Lowest elevation: 24 m (79 ft)
- Population (2023): 14,359
  - Density: 2,790/km^{2} (7,240/sq mi)
- Time zone: UTC+01:00 (CET)
  - Summer (DST): UTC+02:00 (CEST)
- INSEE/Postal code: 95487 /95340
- ^{1} French Land Register data, which excludes lakes, ponds, glaciers > 1 km^{2} (0.386 sq mi or 247 acres) and river estuaries.

Persan (French pronunciation: [pɛʁsɑ̃]) is a commune in the Val-d'Oise department, Île-de-France, northern France. Persan–Beaumont station has rail connections to Pontoise, Creil, Sarcelles and Paris.

== Population ==
Historical population
Year	Pop.	±% p.a.
1968	6,587	—
1975	9,347	+5.13%
1982	10,045	+1.03%
1990	10,659	+0.74%
1999	9,600	−1.16%
2007	10,250	+0.82%
2012	11,233	+1.85%
2017	12,695	+2.48%
2023	14,359	+2.07%
Source: INSEE

== See also ==
- Communes of the Val-d'Oise department
