= List of busiest railway stations in France =

This is a list of the busiest railway stations in France, with all stations being considered as major stations or hubs, and are also classified as either Category A or Category B stations.

Busiest railway stations in France (2022). Source:
Rank	Station	Annual journeys (millions) (2022)	Location	Region	Image
1	Paris Gare du Nord	211.7	Paris	Île-de-France	
2	Paris Saint-Lazare	102.9	Paris	Île-de-France	
3	Paris Gare de Lyon	102.0	Paris	Île-de-France	
4	Paris Montparnasse	56.9	Paris	Île-de-France	
5	Paris Est	36.8	Paris	Île-de-France	
6	Lyon Part Dieu	36.6	Lyon	Auvergne-Rhône-Alpes	
7	La Defense	35.6	La Defense	Île-de-France	
8	Juvisy-sur-Orge	33.3	Juvisy-sur-Orge	Île-de-France	
9	Magenta	33.0	Paris	Île-de-France	
10	Haussman Saint-Lazare	32.6	Paris	Île-de-France	
11	Saint-Denis	26.9	Saint-Denis	Île-de-France	
12	Bibliothèque François Mitterrand	23.0	Paris	Île-de-France	
13	Saint Michel-Notre Dame	22.8	Paris	Île-de-France	
14	Aulnay-sous-Bois	22.7	Aulnay-sous-Bois	Île-de-France	
15	Lille Flandres	22.0	Lille	Hauts-de-France	
16	Ermont - Eaubonne	21.7	Ermont	Île-de-France	
17	Strasbourg-Ville	21.5	Strasbourg	Grand Est	
18	Bordeaux Saint-Jean	21.4	Bordeaux	Nouvelle-Aquitaine	
19	Paris Austerlitz	19.5	Paris	Île-de-France	
20	Versailles Chantiers	18.9	Versailles	Île-de-France	
21	Le Bourget	18.3	Le Bourget	Île-de-France	
22	Asnières-sur-Seine	17.6	Asnières-sur-Seine	Île-de-France	
23	Marseille Saint-Charles	16.9	Marseille	Provence-Alpes-Côte d'Azur	
24	Val de Fontenay	16.5	Fontenay-sous-Bois	Île-de-France	
25	Argenteuil	16.0	Argenteuil	Île-de-France	
26	Houilles - Carrières-sur-Seine	15.9	Paris	Île-de-France	
27	Noisy-le-Sec	15.7	Noisy-le-Sec	Île-de-France	
28	Nantes	15.5	Nantes	Pays de la Loire	
29	Épinay - Villetaneuse	15.3	Épinay-sur-Seine	Île-de-France	
30	Garges - Sarcelles	14.8	Garges-lès-Gonesse	Île-de-France	
31	Villeneuve - Saint-Georges	14.8	Villeneuve-Saint-Georges	Île-de-France	
32	Bondy	14.6	Bondy	Île-de-France	
33	Rennes	13.9	Rennes	Brittany	
34	Melun	13.1	Melun	Île-de-France	
35	La Plaine Stade de France	13.0	Saint-Denis	Île-de-France	
36	Aeroport Charles de Gaulle 2 TGV	13.0	Roissy-en-France	Île-de-France	
37	Toulouse Matabiau	12.9	Toulouse	Occitania	
38	Cergy Prefecture	12.7	Cergy	Île-de-France	
39	La Courneuve–Aubervilliers	12.0	La Courneuve	Île-de-France	
40	Rosa Parks	12.0	Paris	Île-de-France	
41	Maisons-Alfort-Alfortville	11.3	Maisons-Alfort	Île-de-France	
42	Clichy - Levallois	11.2	Levallois-Perret	Île-de-France	
43	Poissy	11.1	Poissy	Île-de-France	
44	Choisy-le-Roi	10.9	Choisy-le-Roi	Île-de-France	
45	Bécon-les-Bruyères	10.8	Paris	Île-de-France	
46	Pierrefitte - Stains	10.6	Pierrefitte-sur-Seine	Île-de-France	
47	Sartrouville	10.0	Sartrouville	Île-de-France	
48	Villiers-le-Bel– Gonesse–Arnouville	9.9	Arnouville	Île-de-France	
49	Saint-Quentin-en-Yvelines–Montigny-le-Bretonneux	9.6	Montigny-le-Bretonneux	Île-de-France	
50	Nice-Ville	9.4	Nice	Provence-Alpes -Côte d'Azur	
