= Les Clairières de Verneuil station =

Railway station in Villennes-sur-Seine, France

Les Clairières de Verneuil
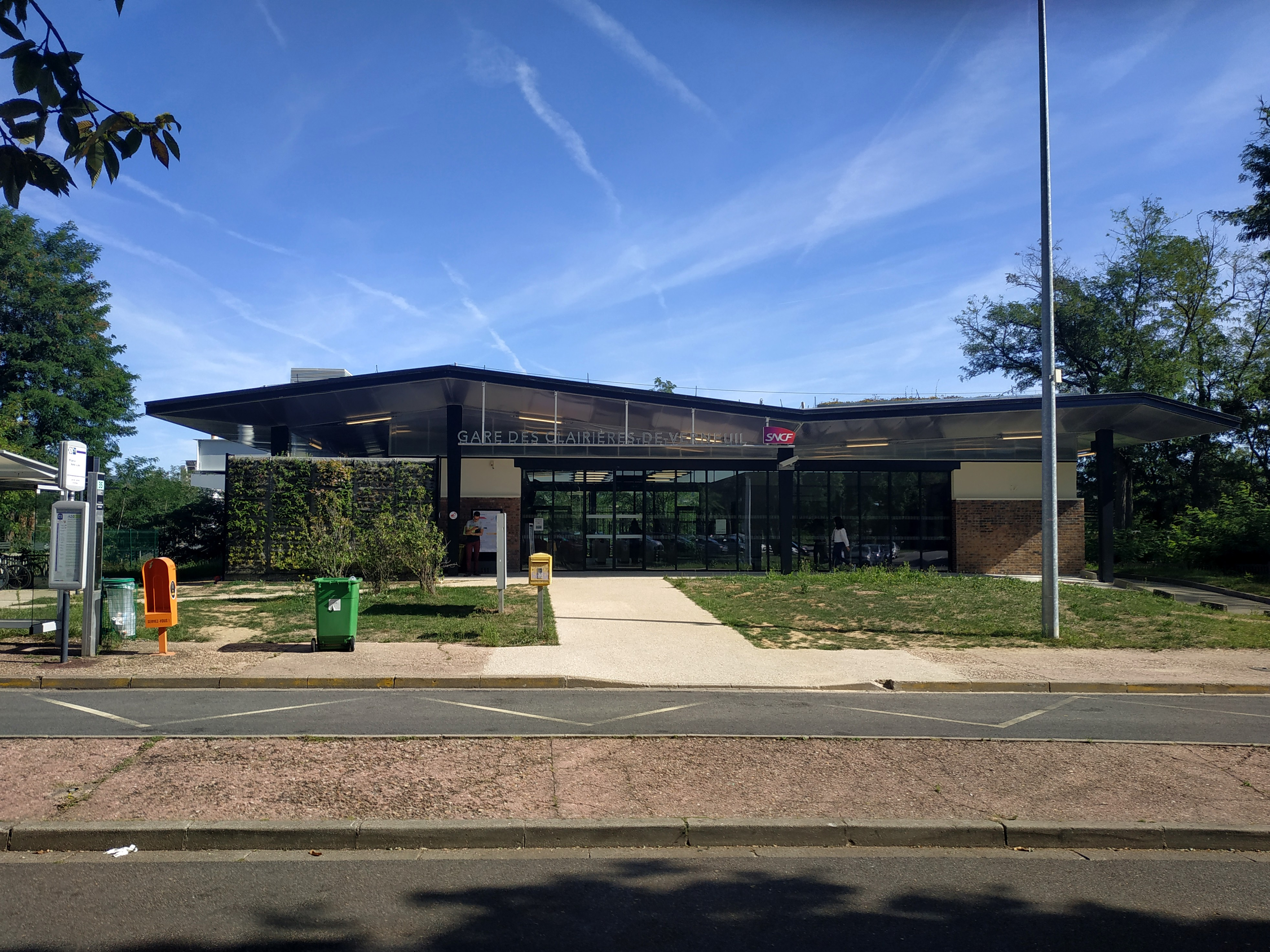
- The passenger building in 2019

General information
- Location: Place de la Résistance; 78480 Verneuil-sur-Seine; France
- Coordinates: 48°59′32″N 1°57′19″E
- Owner: SNCF
- Operator: SNCF
- Platforms: 1 island platform
- Tracks: 4

Construction
- Accessible: Yes, by prior reservation

Other information
- Station code: 87386664
- Fare zone: 5

History
- Opened: May 1974

Passengers
- 2023: 488,969

Services
Preceding station	Transilien	Following station
Vernouillet–Verneuil towards Paris-St.-Lazare	Line J	Les Mureaux towards Ermont–Eaubonne, Gisors, Mantes-la-Jolie or Vernon
Location

Les Clairières de Verneuil is a French rail station of the Paris-Saint-Lazare–Le Havre line located in Verneuil-sur-Seine, in the departement of the Yvelines, in Île-de-France.

The station is operated by the SNCF (Société nationale des chemins de fer français) and served by trains of the Transilien Line J.

== Location ==
The station is established at an altitude of 27 meters, and located at kilometric point (PK) 37.030 of Paris–Le Havre line, between the stations Les Mureaux and Vernouillet–Verneuil.

== History ==
The station opened in May 1974.

In 2016, in order to take into account the characteristics of the rolling stock of the extension of the RER E to Mantes-la-Jolie, the platforms were raised during the closure of the station for maintenance. At the same time, the escalator was dismantled in favor of a new device adapted to people with reduced mobility.

== Attendance ==
From 2015 to 2024, according to SNCF estimates, the annual passenger traffic at the station amounted to the figures indicated in the table below:

Year	2015	2016	2017	2018	2019	2020	2021	2022	2023	2024
Passengers	405,538	402,805	398,401	385,612	375,772	194,818	368,213	459,575	488,969	539,217

== Service ==
=== Train service ===
The station is served by trains of the Transilien Line J.

=== Connections ===
The station is served by the following bus lines:

- Poissy - Les Mureaux: 6537
- Noctilien: N151

== Gallery ==
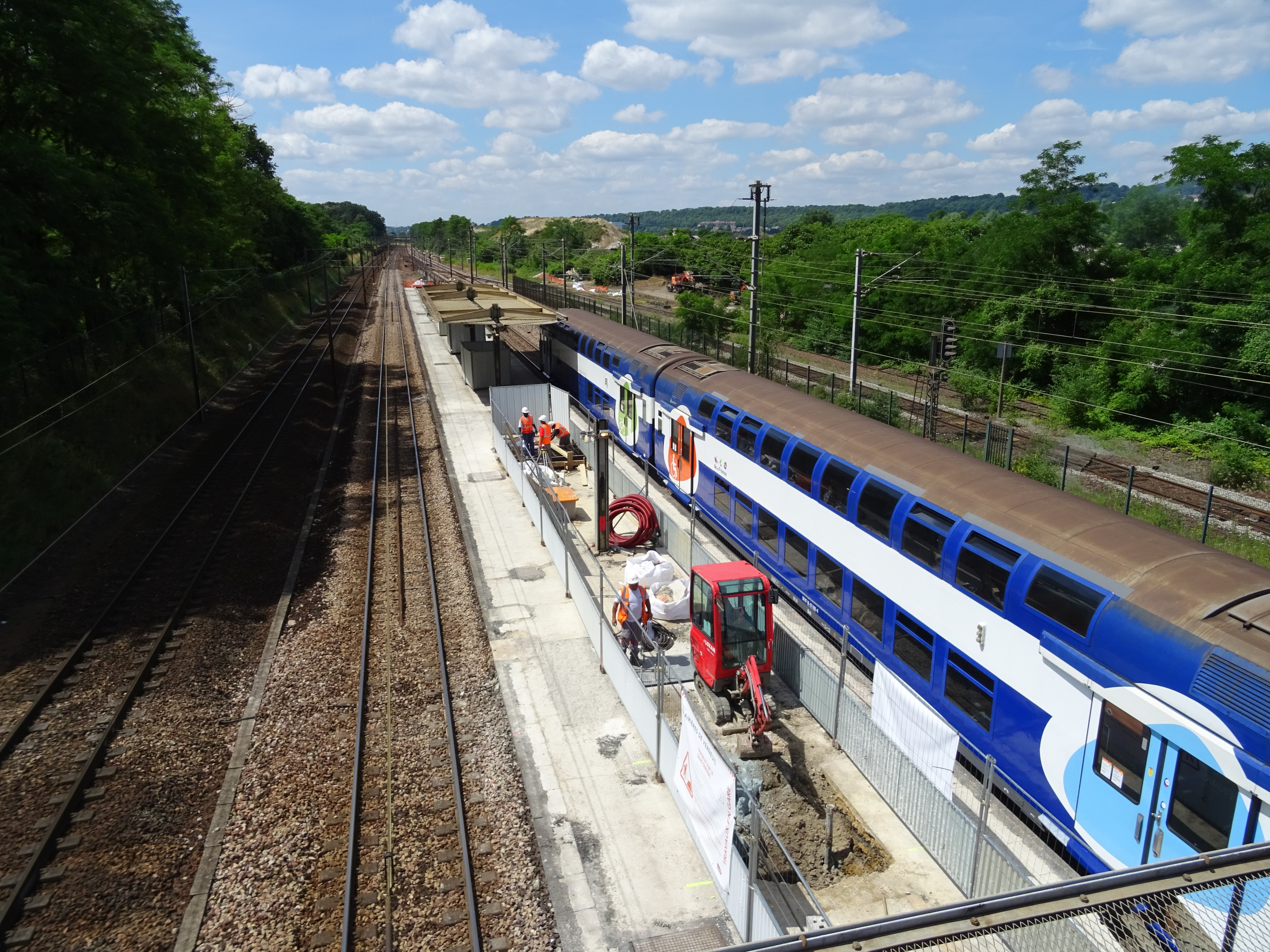

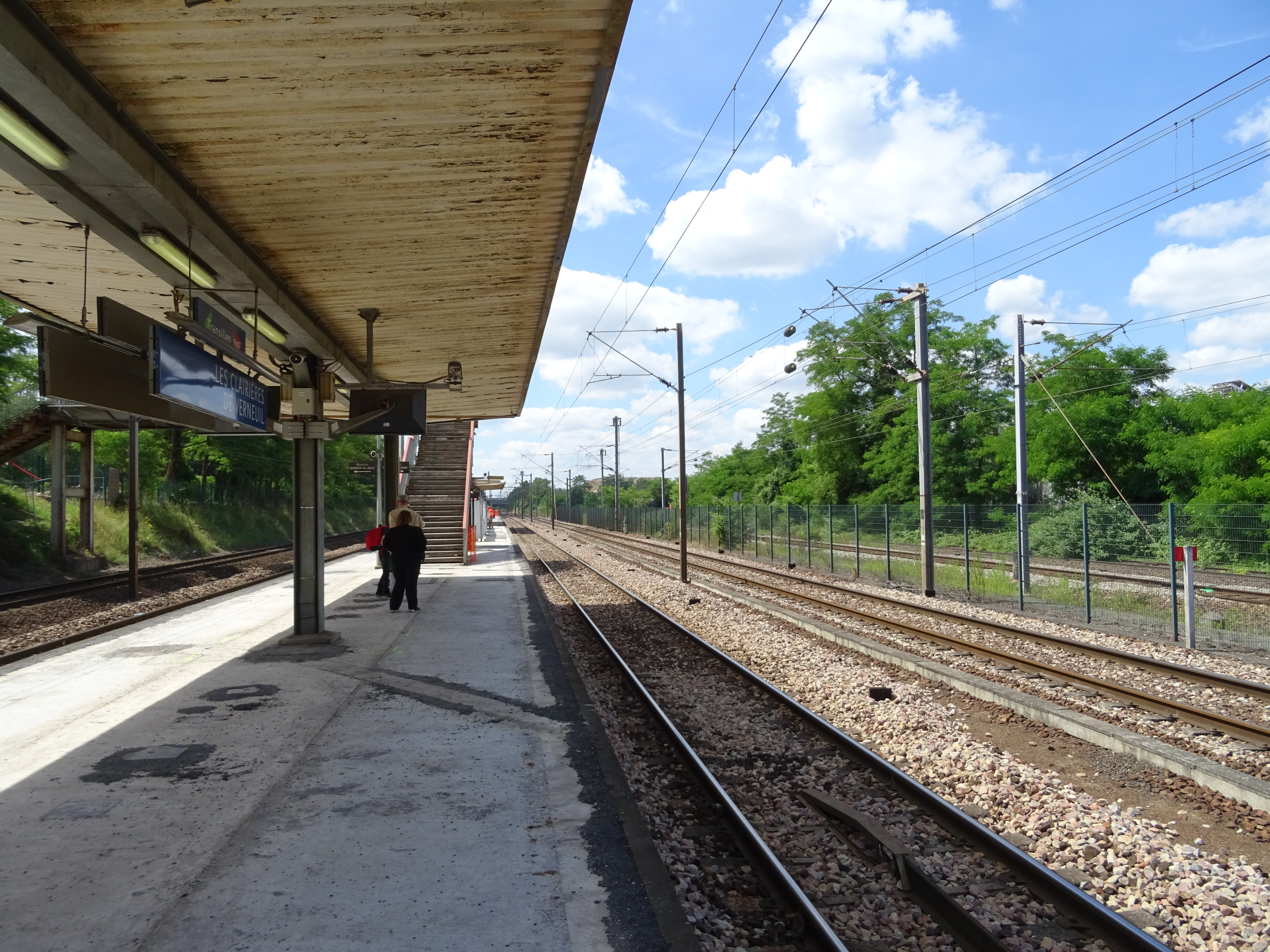

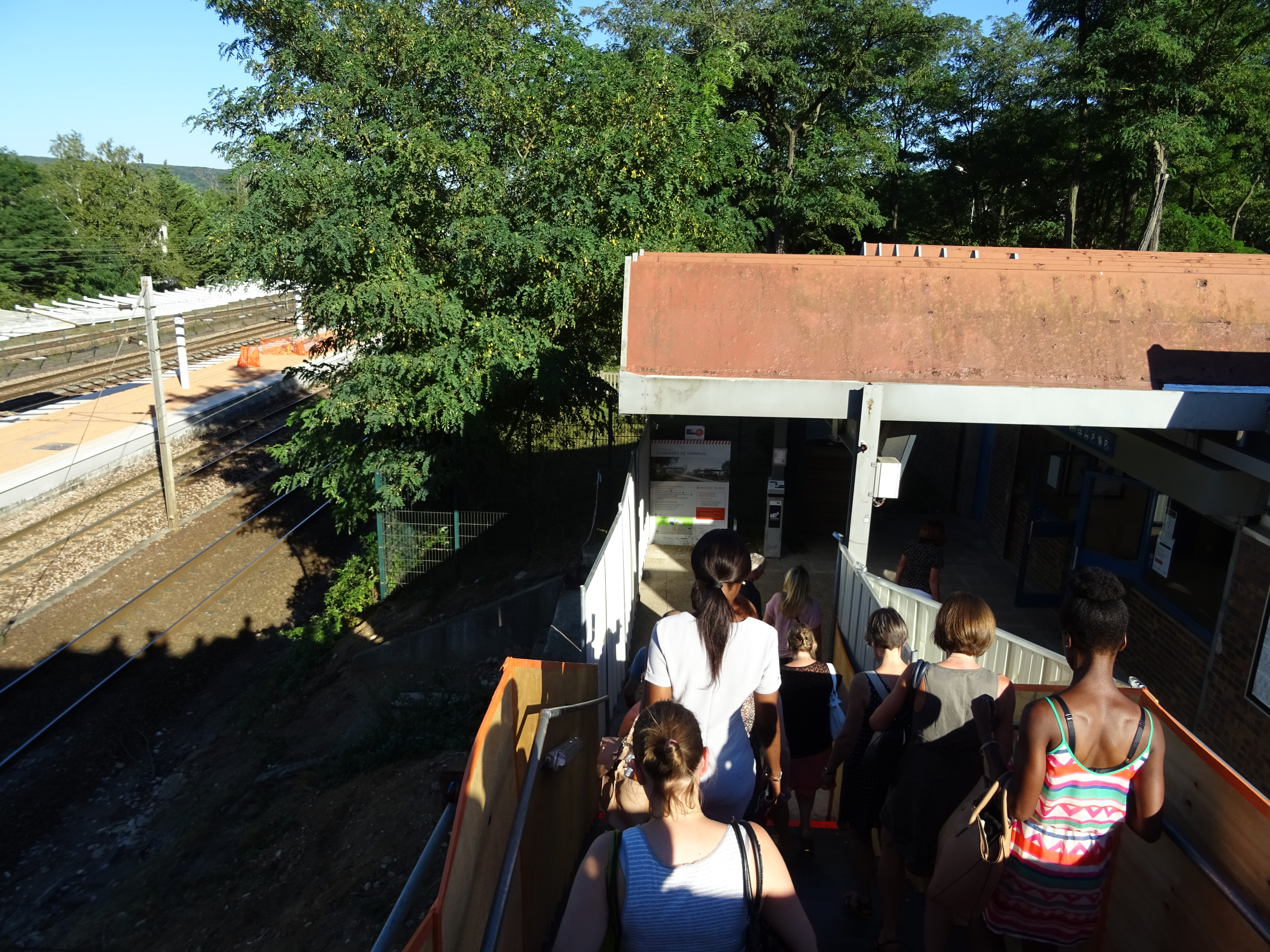

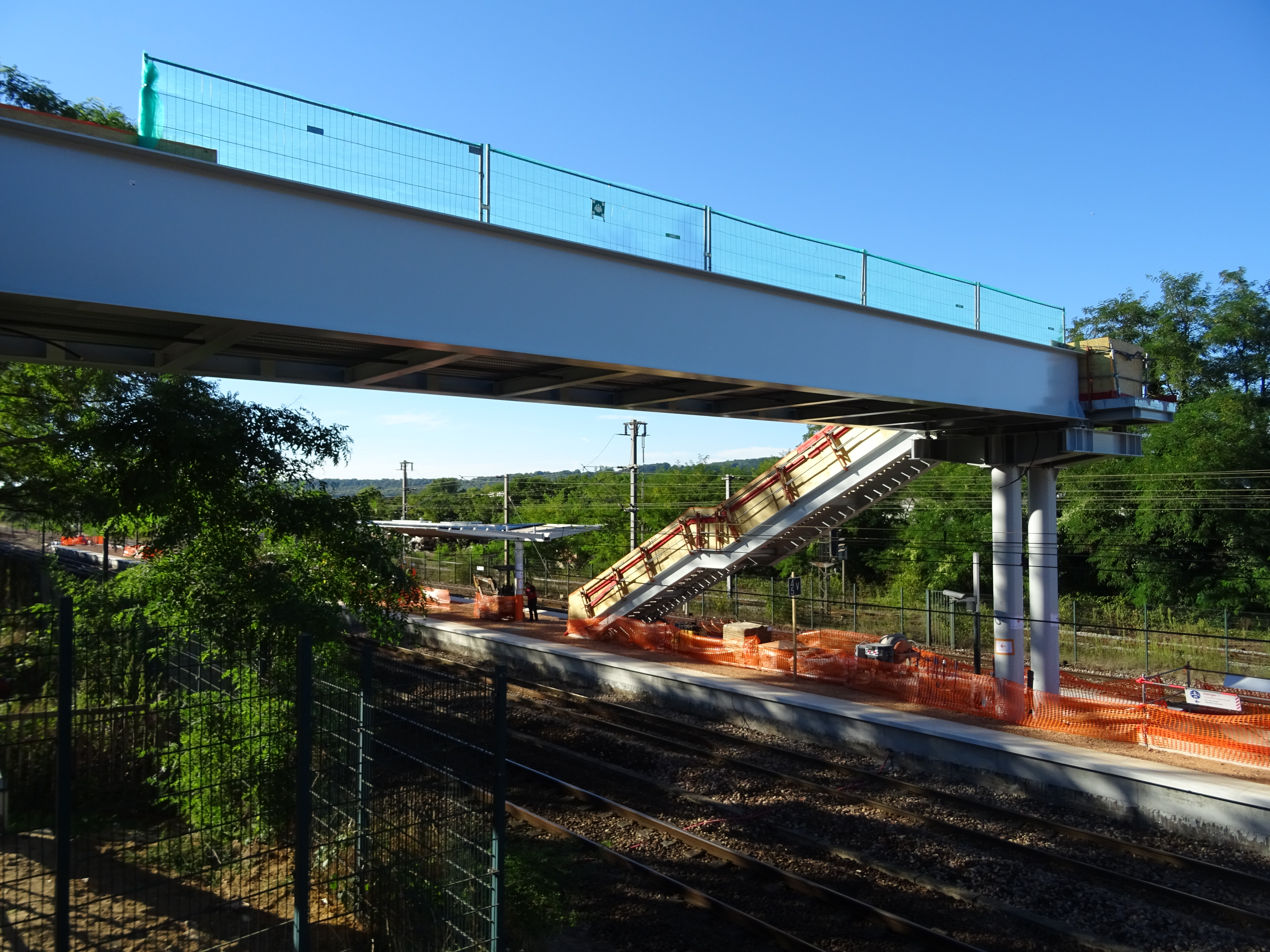

== Projects ==
=== Extension of the RER E ===
In 2028 or 2029, the station is scheduled to be connected with the RER E due to the extension to Mantes-la-Jolie, replacing the branch Paris-Saint-Lazare – Mantes-la-Jolie (via Poissy).

== See also ==
- List of Transilien stations
