= Asnières-sur-Seine station =

Railway station in Asnières-sur-Seine, France

Asnières sur Seine
- Asnières-sur-Seine station entrance

General information
- Location: Rue de la Station; Asnières-sur-Seine; France
- Coordinates: 48°54′22″N 2°16′58″E
- Elevation: 37 m (121 ft)
- Operator: SNCF
- Line: Paris–Le Havre railway
- Platforms: 4 island platforms, 1 side platform
- Tracks: 8 + 2 passing tracks
- Connections: RATP Bus: 165 175 238; Noctilien: N154

Construction
- Structure type: At-grade
- Accessible: Yes, by prior reservation

Other information
- Station code: 87381137
- Fare zone: 3

Passengers
- 2024: 18,129,540

Services
Preceding station	Transilien	Following station
Bois-Colombes towards Ermont–Eaubonne, Gisors, Mantes-la-Jolie or Vernon	Line J	Paris–Saint Lazare Terminus
Houilles–Carrières-sur-Seine towards Vernon–Giverny	Line J	Paris–Saint Lazare Terminus
Bécon-les-Bruyères towards Cergy-le-Haut, Saint-Nom-la-Bretèche or Versailles–Rive Droite	Line L	Clichy–Levallois towards Paris–Saint Lazare
Location

Asnières-sur-Seine is a railway station in the town of Asnières-sur-Seine, Hauts-de-Seine department, in the northwestern suburbs of Paris, France. It is on the Paris–Le Havre railway, and is served by Transilien Lines L and J from Gare Saint-Lazare.
