= Maisons-Laffitte station =

Railway station in Maisons-Laffitte, France

Maisons Laffitte
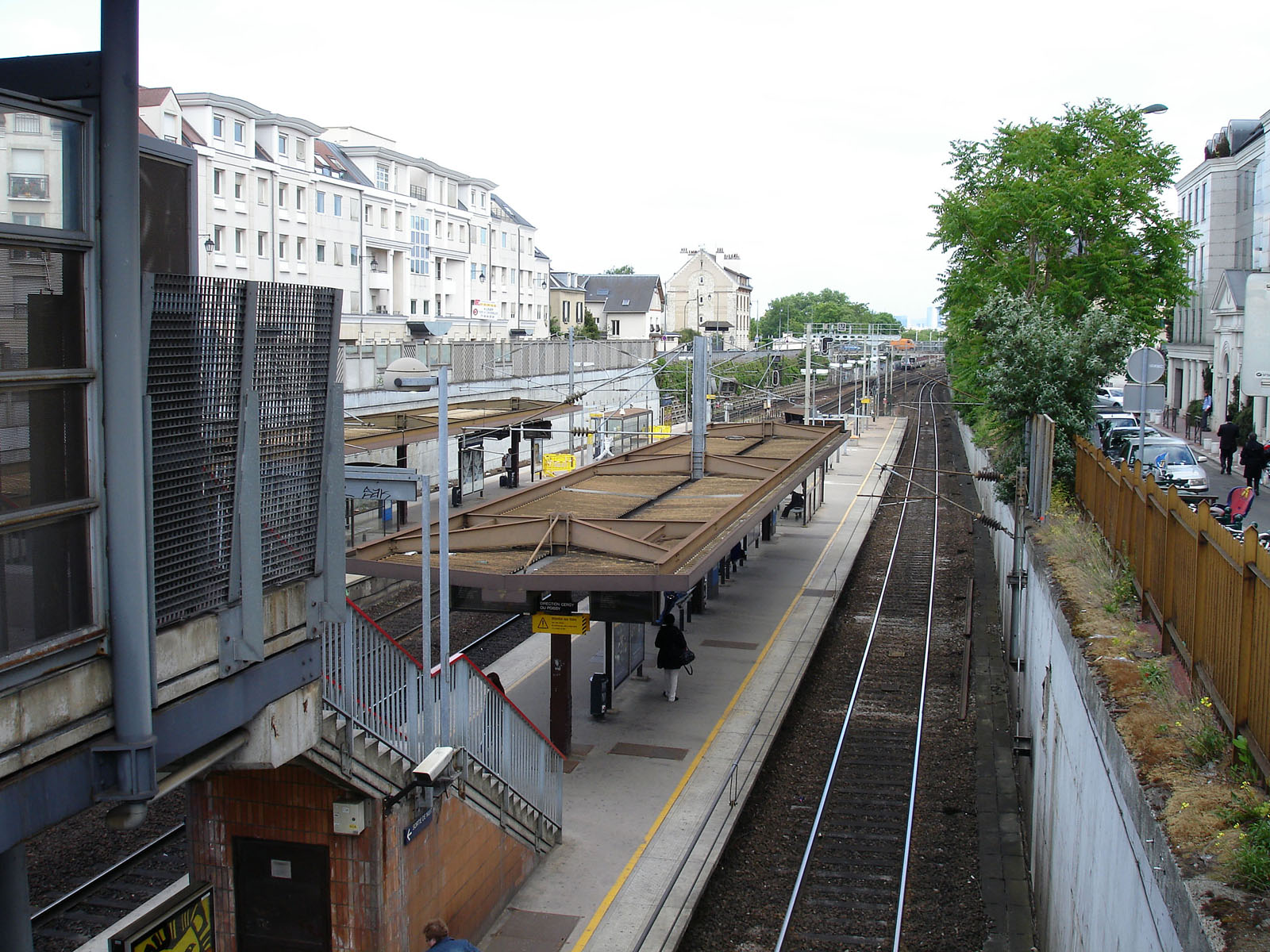
- Maisons-Laffitte station platforms

General information
- Location: Maisons-Laffitte; France
- Coordinates: 48°56′46″N 2°08′38″E
- Operator: SNCF
- Line: Paris–Le Havre railway
- Platforms: 2 island platforms
- Tracks: 4

Construction
- Structure type: At-grade
- Cycle facilities: Covered racks
- Accessible: Yes, by prior reservation

Other information
- Station code: 87386425
- Fare zone: 4

Passengers
- 2024: 9,174,377

Services
Preceding station	RER	Following station
Achères-Ville towards Cergy-le-Haut	RER A	Sartrouville towards Marne-la-Vallée–Chessy
Achères–Grand-Cormier towards Poissy	RER A	Sartrouville towards Marne-la-Vallée–Chessy
Preceding station	Transilien	Following station
Achères-Ville towards Cergy-le-Haut	Line L	Sartrouville towards Paris–Saint Lazare
Location

Maisons-Laffitte station is a railway station in Maisons-Laffitte, a northwestern suburb of Paris, France. It is on the Paris–Le Havre railway. The rer line A passes through the station. The station has a glass entrance with blue glass and is built in red bricks. The closest station to Maisons-Laffitte is the one of Sartrouville which is 1.3 km (0.81 mi) away. It is composed of two accessible platforms, both which are used for the rer line A.

== History ==
Maisons-Laffitte station was opened in 1843 as part of the construction of the Paris–Le Havre railway, one of the oldest railway lines in France. Its creation played a major role in transforming Maisons-Laffitte from a quiet village into a desirable suburban town for Parisians and foregniers.

The arrival of the railway encouraged residential development and helped establish the town’s reputation as a prestigious and accessible location, attracting wealthy families and contributing to the construction of the nearby Château de Maisons-Laffitte and surrounding estates.

== Services ==
The station is currently served by:

- The RER A line, connecting Maisons-Laffitte to Paris city center (La Défense, Auber, Châtelet – Les Halles) and to western suburbs including Saint-Germain-en-Laye.
- The Transilien Line L, which connects Paris Saint-Lazare station to the western suburbs and terminates in Cergy-le-Haut or Poissy.

Trains run frequently throughout the day, and the station serves as a convenient transport hub for both commuters and local residents.

== Station Layout ==
Maisons-Laffitte station has:

- Three platforms: two side platforms and one central platform.
- Four tracks, allowing simultaneous arrivals and departures in both directions.
- Elevators and ramps for accessibility.
- A staffed ticket office, automatic ticket machines, bicycle parking, and nearby bus connections.

== Connections ==
The station is well-connected to local public transport. It serves as a hub for the Argenteuil - Boucles de Seine bus network and is also part of the Noctilien night bus service.

Bus lines serving the station include:

- Line 2: Maisons-Laffitte – Saint-Germain-en-Laye
- Line 6: Maisons-Laffitte – Le Mesnil-le-Roi
- Line 12: Urban circuit
- Line 262: Maisons-Laffitte – Pont de Bezons
- Noctilien N152: Cergy-le-Haut – Paris Saint-Lazare

== Nearby ==
The station is located in the town center, close to:

- The Château de Maisons-Laffitte
- The large municipal park and forest
- Local shops, schools, and the town hall

== See also ==
- List of stations of the Paris RER
