= Sartrouville station =

Railway station in Sartrouville, France

Sartrouville
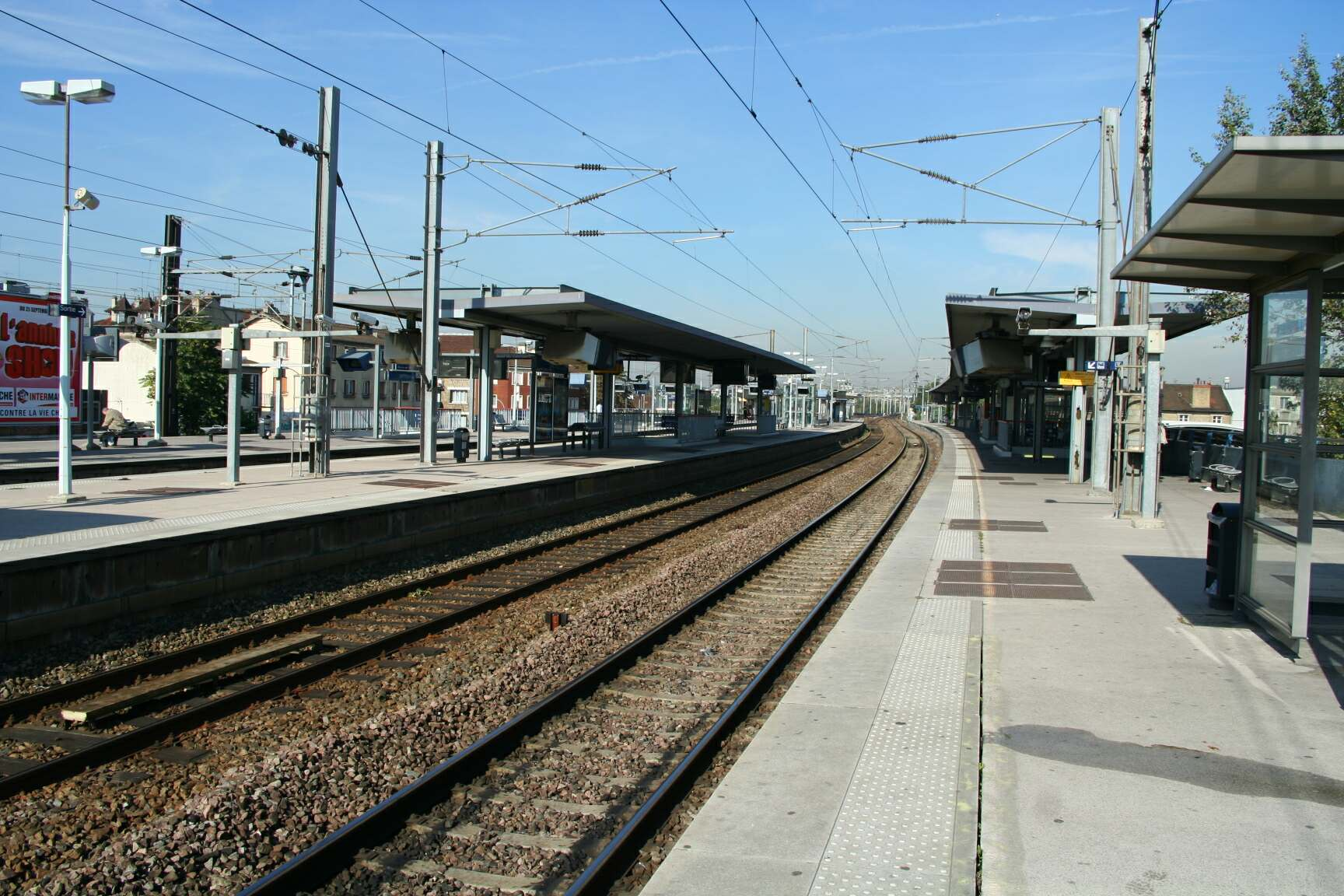
- Sartrouville station platforms

General information
- Location: Sartrouville; France
- Coordinates: 48°56′17″N 2°09′25″E
- Operator: SNCF
- Platforms: 1 side platform, 2 island platforms
- Tracks: 4 + 1 bypass

Construction
- Structure type: Elevated
- Parking: Yes
- Cycle facilities: Covered racks
- Accessible: Yes, by prior reservation

Other information
- Station code: 87386417
- Fare zone: 4

Passengers
- 2024: 11,419,082

Services
Preceding station	RER	Following station
Maisons-Laffitte towards Cergy-le-Haut or Poissy	RER A	Houilles–Carrières-sur-Seine towards Marne-la-Vallée–Chessy
Preceding station	Transilien	Following station
Maisons-Laffitte towards Cergy-le-Haut	Line L	Houilles–Carrières-sur-Seine towards Paris–Saint Lazare
Location

Sartrouville station is a railway station serving Sartrouville, a northwestern suburb of Paris, France. It is on the Paris–Le Havre railway.

== See also ==
- List of stations of the Paris RER
