= Nanterre-Préfecture station =

RER train station in the commune of Nanterre, France

Nanterre Préfecture
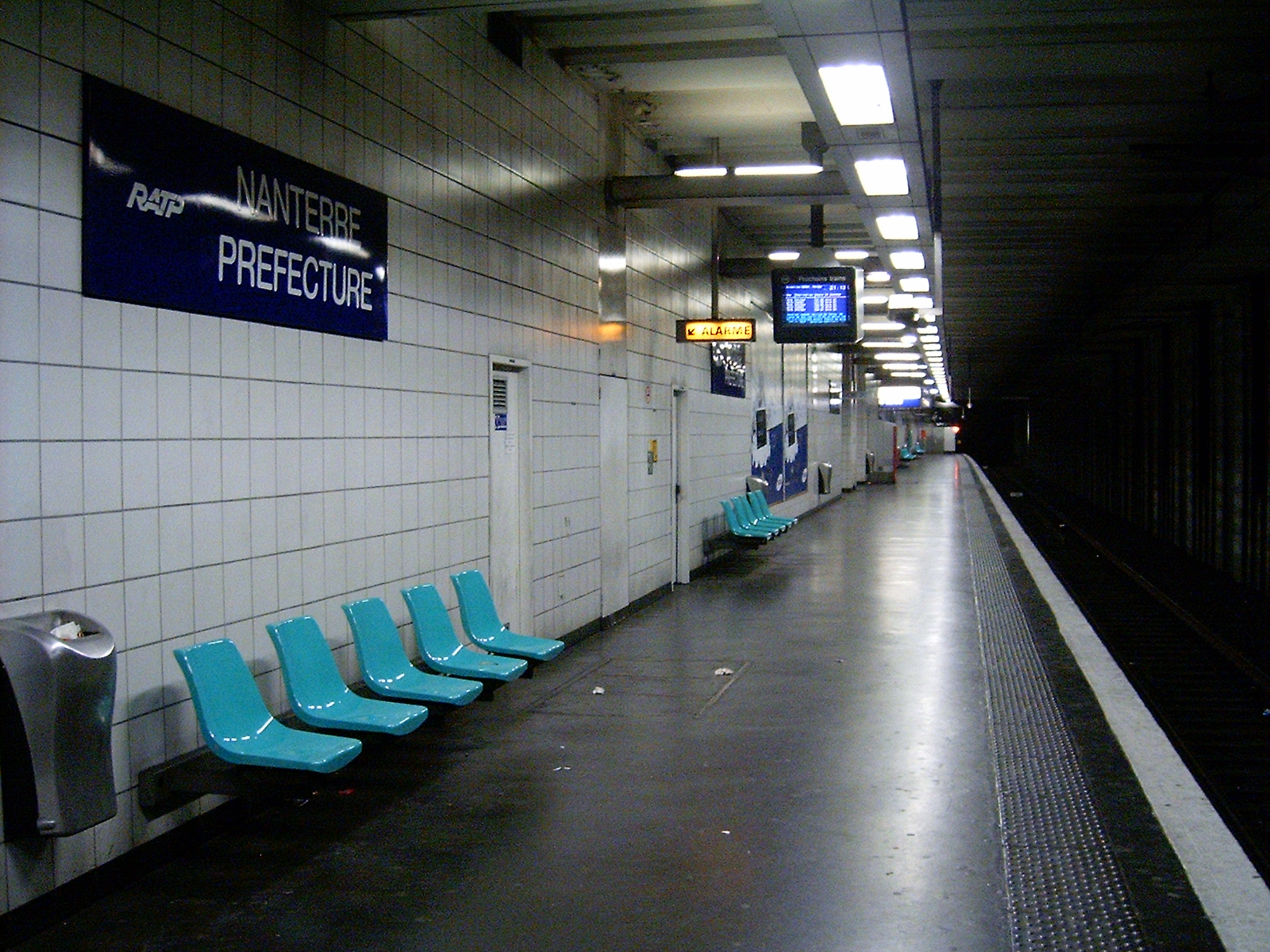
- Platform towards Cergy or Poissy in December 2007

General information
- Location: Nanterre; France
- Coordinates: 48°53′44″N 2°13′23″E
- Operator: RATP Group
- Platforms: 2 side platforms (upper level); 1 island platform (lower level)
- Tracks: 4
- Connections: at Nanterre–La Folie

Construction
- Structure type: Underground
- Platform levels: 2
- Accessible: Yes, by request to staff

Other information
- Station code: 87758029
- Fare zone: 3

History
- Opened: 1 October 1973

Services
Preceding station	RER	Following station
Nanterre-Université towards Saint-Germain-en-Laye	RER A	La Défense towards Boissy-Saint-Léger or Marne-la-Vallée–Chessy
Houilles–Carrières-sur-Seine towards Cergy-le-Haut or Poissy	RER A	La Défense towards Boissy-Saint-Léger or Marne-la-Vallée–Chessy
Connections to other stations
Preceding station	RER	Following station
Terminus	RER E transfer at Nanterre–La Folie	La Défense towards Chelles–Gournay or Tournan
Location

Nanterre–Préfecture (French pronunciation: [nɑ̃tɛʁ pʁefɛktyʁ]) is an RER train station in the commune of Nanterre, west of central Paris, in the department of Hauts-de-Seine in France. The station was opened on 1 October 1973, on the "ligne de St-Germain" connecting Auber and Saint-Germain-en-Laye. It is the westernmost station of the central trunk segment of the RER A. The line splits at this station into multiple branches headed westward; the A1 (to Saint-Germain-en-Laye) and the A3 and A5 branches (to Cergy-le-Haut and Poissy) respectively.

== Station ==
Nanterre-Préfecture is an underground station located close to the prefecture of the department of Hauts-de-Seine, hence the name. The central part of RER A, as well as A1 to Germaine-en-Laye, are operated by RATP. The branches A3 to Cergy and A5 to Poissy are operated by SNCF. The station has the central platform, where trains depart to the center of Paris, and two side platforms, one for A1 and one for A3/A5.

== History ==
In 1965, following the extension of the agglomeration far beyond the city limits of Paris, RATP and SNCF came out with the plan of the transport network development, which, in particular, included the development of RER. In 1969, RATP bought from SNCF the railway connecting Boisy-Saint-Léger and Bastille and built a stretch between Bastille and Nation. On 14 December the new line (RER) started operation. On 21 January 1970, RATP bought a railway line between Gare Saint-Lazare and Saint-Germain-en-Laye ("ligne de St-Germain"). On 1 October 1972, the service started between Auber and Saint-Germain-en-Laye. This stretch was not yet connected to the eastern part of RER A. In October 1973 the station of Nanterre-Préfecture was open in the existing tunnel and started operation. On 9 December 1977, the western and the eastern stretches were connected, and thus Nanterre-Préfecture was placed on RER A line. On 29 May 1988, service in the direction of Cergy started.

== Service ==
The trains depart with the following frequency:

- towards Saint-Germain-en-Laye: 1 train every 10 minutes in off-peak times, 12 trains/hour during peak hours and 1 train every 15 minutes in the evening;
- towards Poissy: 1 train every 20 minutes in off-peak times, 6 trains/hour during peak hours and a train every 30 minutes in the evening;
- towards Cergy-le-Haut: 1 train every 10 minutes in off-peak times and in the peak hours (except in the evening), 1 train every 20 minutes on Saturdays and Sundays (except in the evening) and 1 train every 30 minutes every day in the evening;
- towards Paris, Boissy-Saint-Léger, and Marne-la-Vallée – Chessy: 15 trains per hour in off-peak times and 18 trains/hour during peak hours (except in the evening), 12 trains/hour on Saturdays and Sundays (except in the evening), 8 trains/hour every day in the evening.

== Bus connections ==
- RATP Bus: 160 163
- R'Bus: 92

== Passenger traffic ==
More than 21,000 passengers daily used the station as of 2011. The number of passengers was predicted to increase to 25,000 by 2012, because of the construction around the station with the goal of improving its accessibility.

== Gallery ==
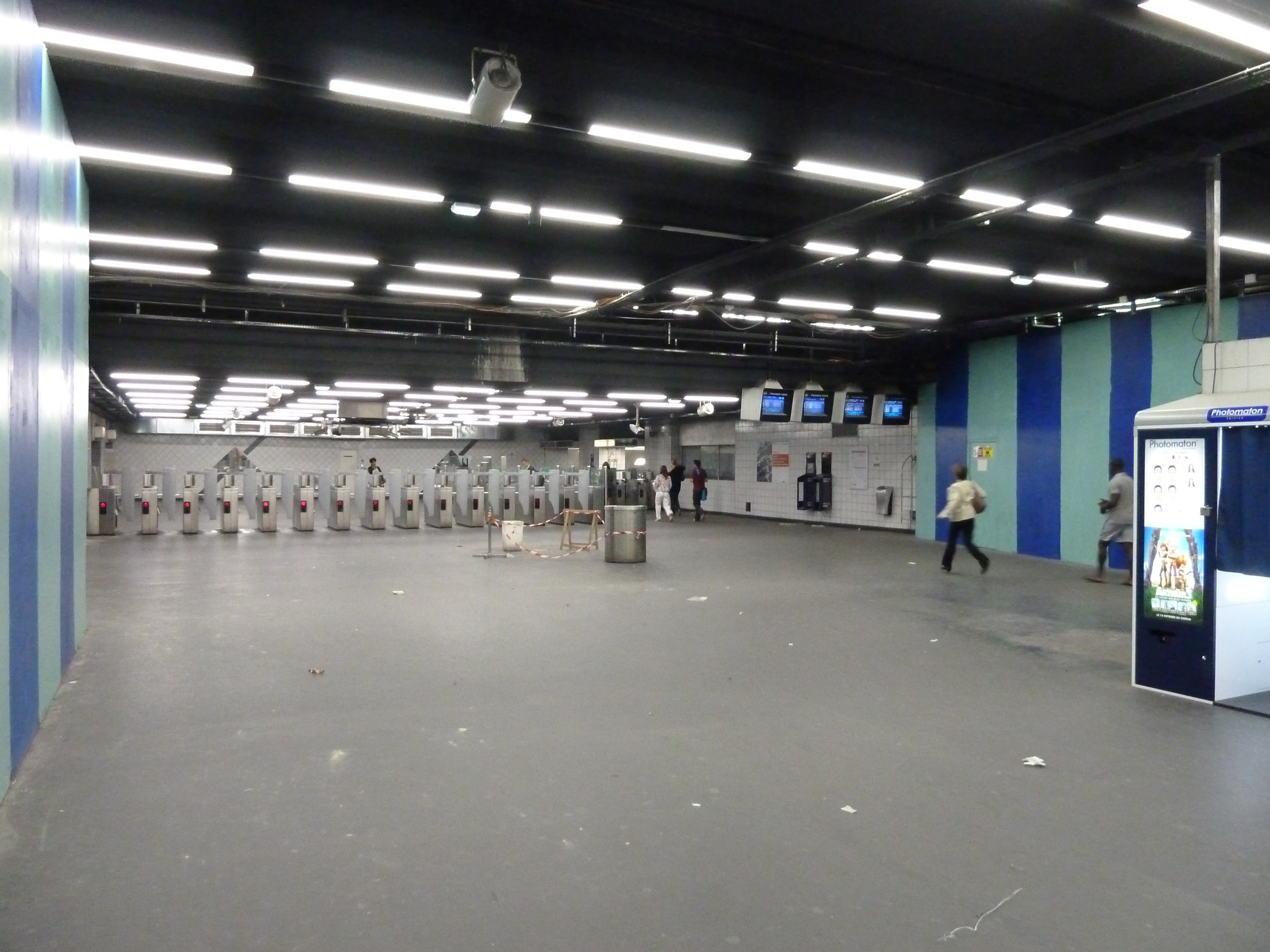
Concourse

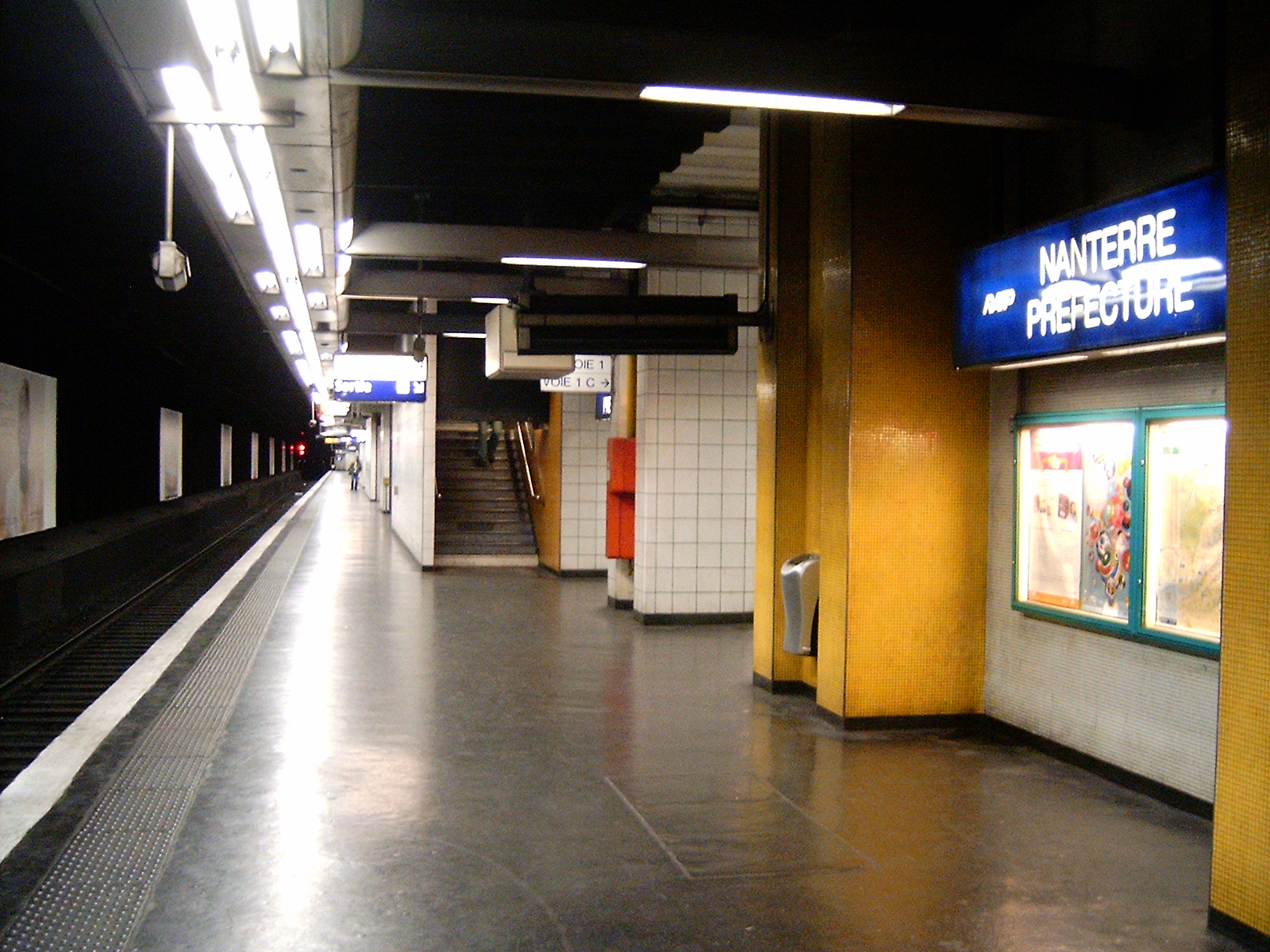
platform for Saint Germain en Laye

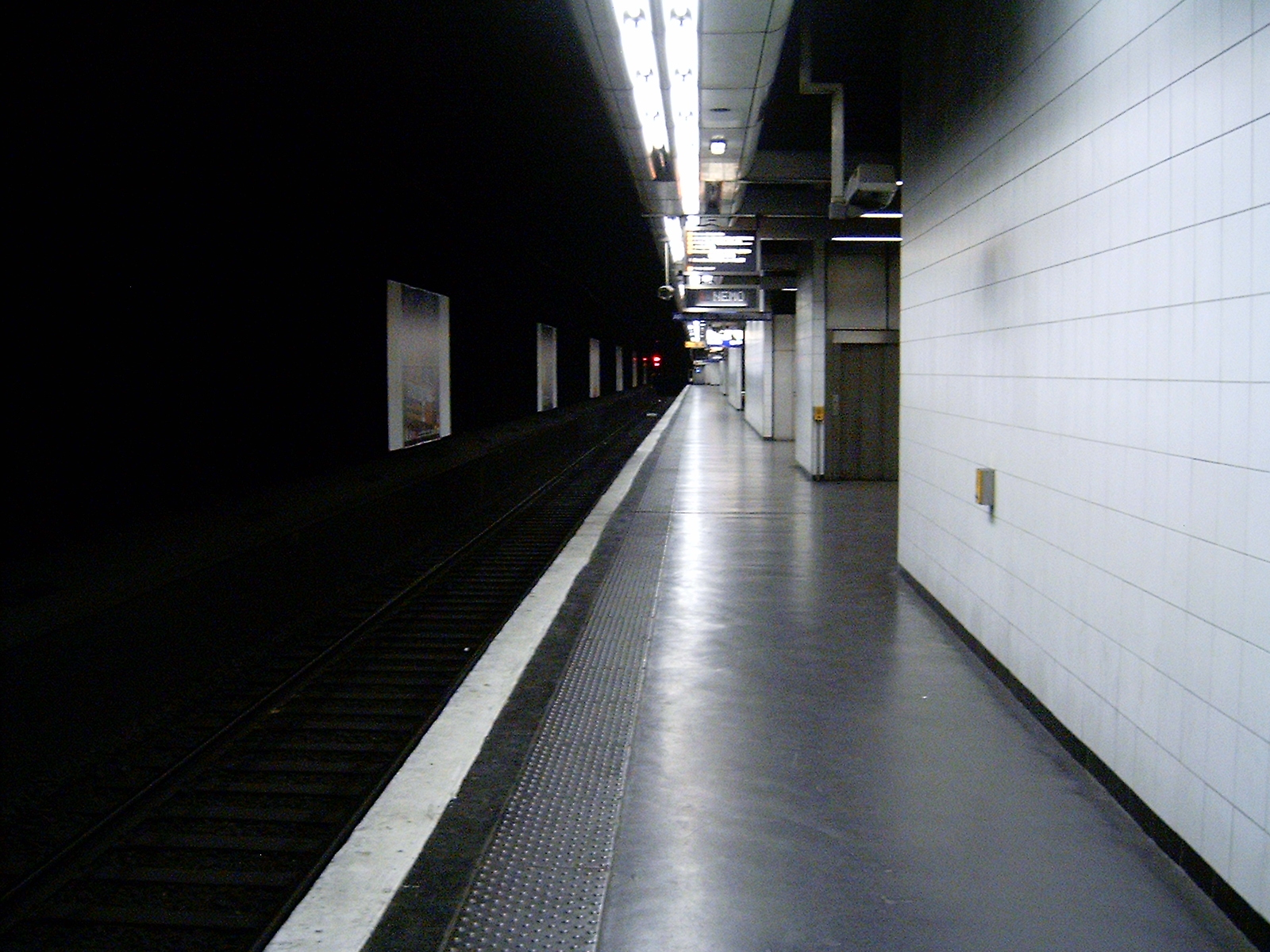
platform for Boissy Saint Léger

== See also ==
- List of stations of the Paris RER
