= Sannois station =

Railway station in Sannois, France

Coordinates: 48°58′14″N 2°15′50″E

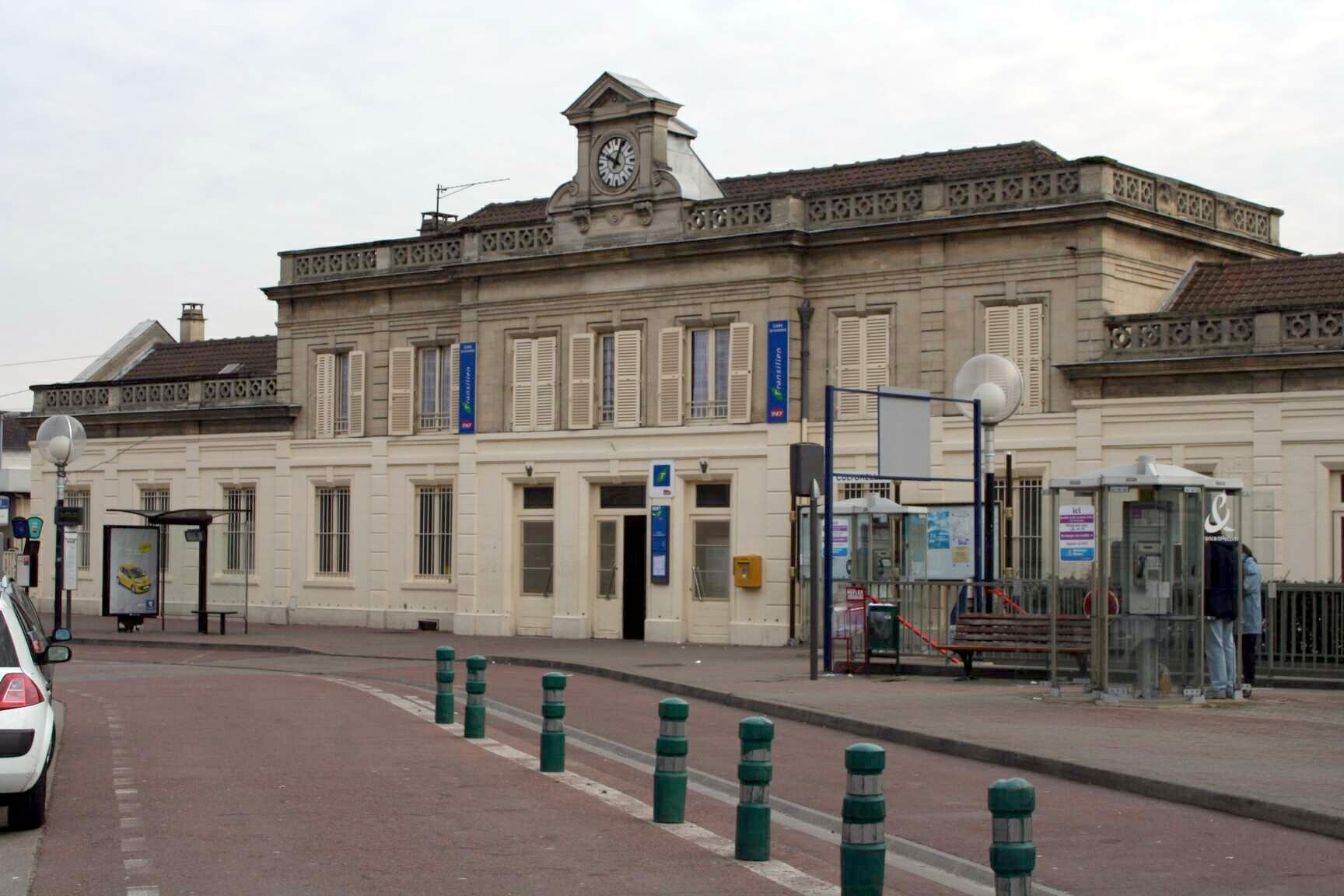
The station

Sannois is a railway station situated in Sannois, in the département of Val-d'Oise. It was served by the RER C until 2006, which was when it was transferred to Transilien Line J.

== Line serving this station ==
- SNCF Gare Saint-Lazare (Banlieue) - Ermont — Eaubonne (Terminus)

== See also ==
- List of stations of the Paris RER

Preceding station	Transilien	Following station
Argenteuil towards Paris-St.-Lazare	Line J	Ermont–Eaubonne Terminus
