= Bois-Colombes station =

Railway station in Bois-Colombes, France

Bois-Colombes
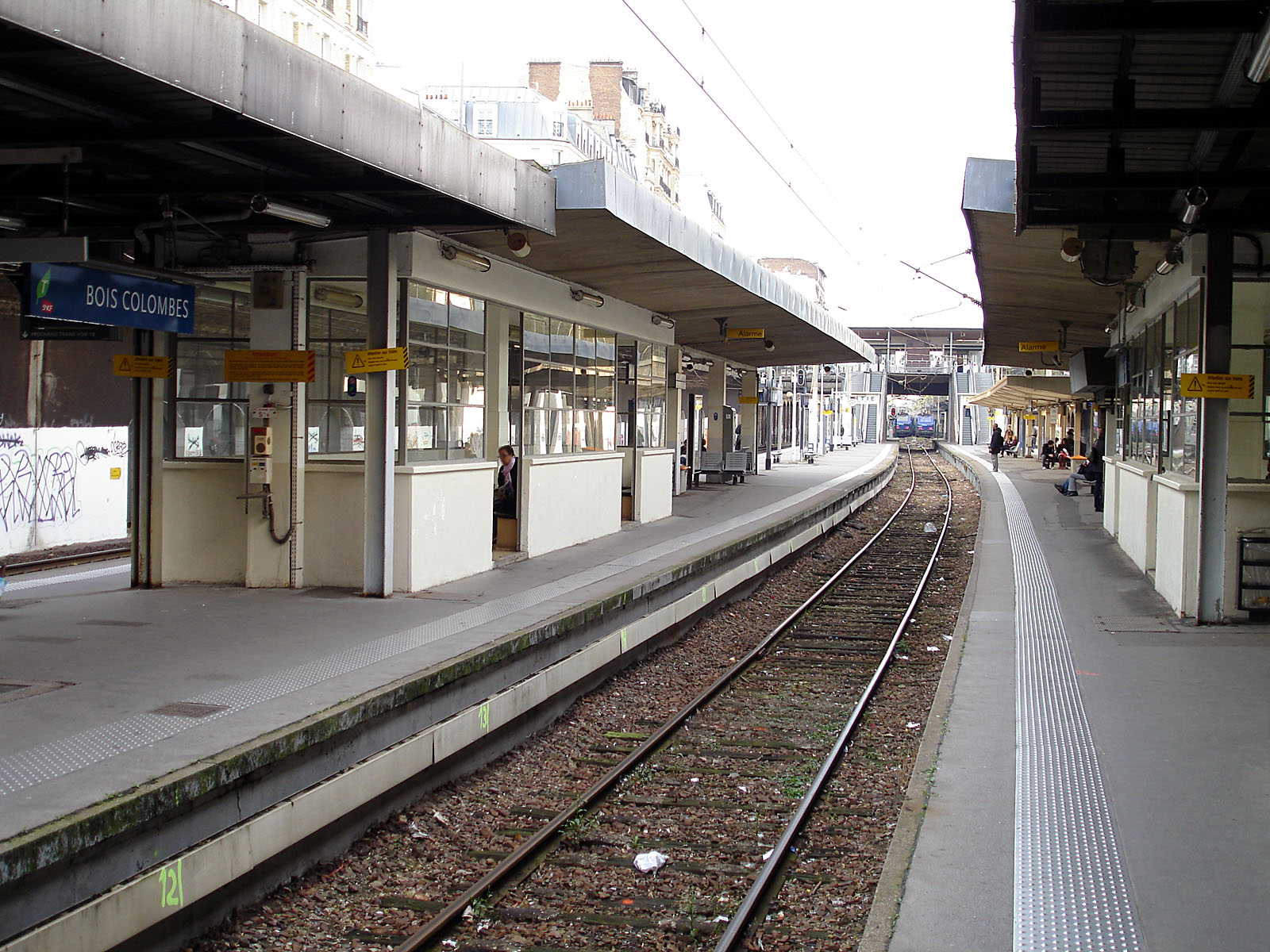

General information
- Location: Bois-Colombes, Hauts-de-Seine, Île-de-France, France
- Coordinates: 48°54′50″N 2°16′20″E

Other information
- Station code: 87381079

Passengers
- 2024: 5,680,808

Services
Preceding station	Transilien	Following station
Asnières-sur-Seine towards Paris-St.-Lazare	Line J	Colombes towards Ermont–Eaubonne
Location

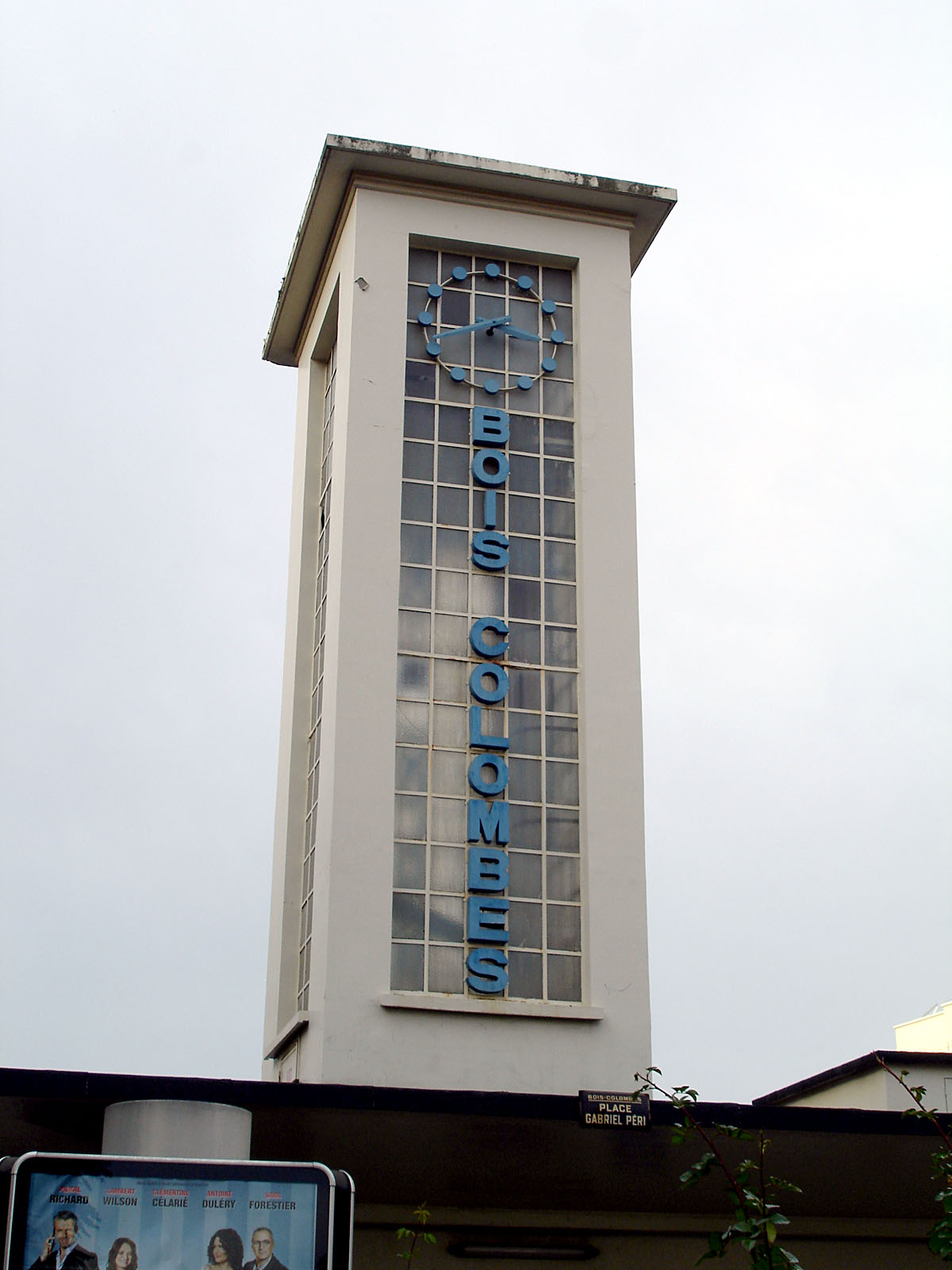
Clocktower

Bois-Colombes is a railway station serving the town Bois-Colombes, Hauts-de-Seine department, in the northwestern suburbs of Paris, France. It sees services from Transilien Saint-Lazare and in the future, Paris Metro Line 15.
