= Clichy–Levallois station =

Railway station in Clichy, France

Clichy Levallois
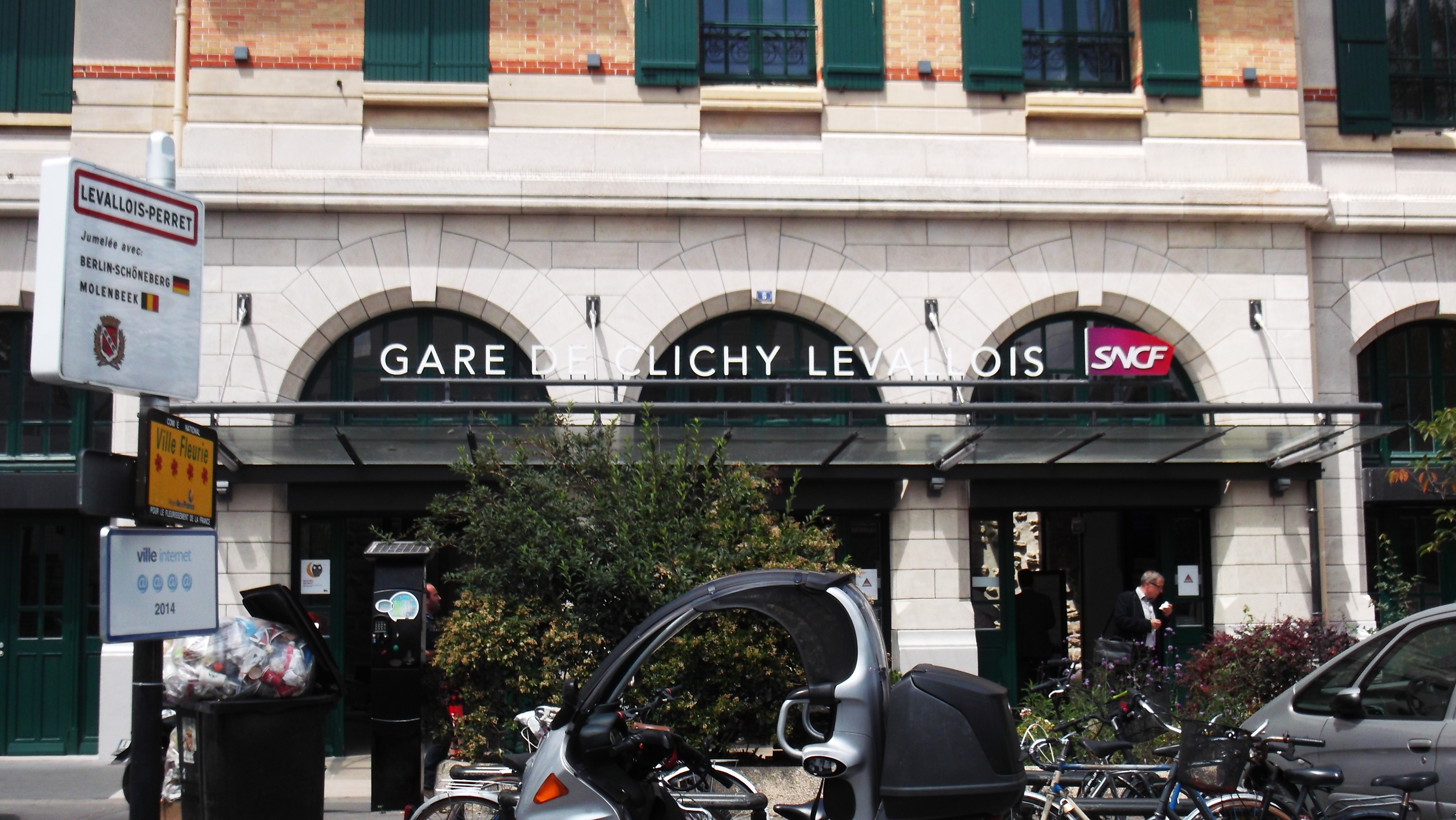
- Entrance to Clichy–Levallois station

General information
- Location: 5 Place du 8 Mai 1945; Levallois-Perret; France
- Coordinates: 48°53′48″N 2°17′54″E
- Elevation: 36.5 m (120 ft)
- Operator: SNCF
- Line: Paris–Le Havre railway
- Platforms: 3 island platforms
- Tracks: 6 + passing and yard tracks

Construction
- Structure type: At-grade
- Accessible: Yes, by prior reservation

Other information
- Station code: 87381129
- Fare zone: 2

History
- Opened: 5 July 1838

Passengers
- 2024: 11,597,203

Services
Preceding station	Transilien	Following station
Asnières-sur-Seine towards Cergy-le-Haut, Saint-Nom-la-Bretèche or Versailles–Rive Droite	Line L	Pont Cardinet towards Paris–Saint Lazare
Location

Clichy–Levallois station (French: Gare de Clichy–Levallois) is a railway station serving the towns of Clichy and Levallois-Perret, in the northwestern suburbs of Paris, France. It is on the Paris–Le Havre railway.
