= Transilien Paris-Saint-Lazare =

Suburban rail network around Paris

Transilien Paris-Saint-Lazare is one of the sectors in the Paris Transilien suburban rail network. The trains on this sector depart from Gare Saint-Lazare in central Paris and serve the north and north-west of Île-de-France region with Transilien lines "J" and "L". Transilien services from Paris to Saint-Lazare are part of the SNCF Saint-Lazare rail network.

The two lines are the busiest lines in the Transilien system, excluding lines signed as part of the RER.

== Line J ==
Line J

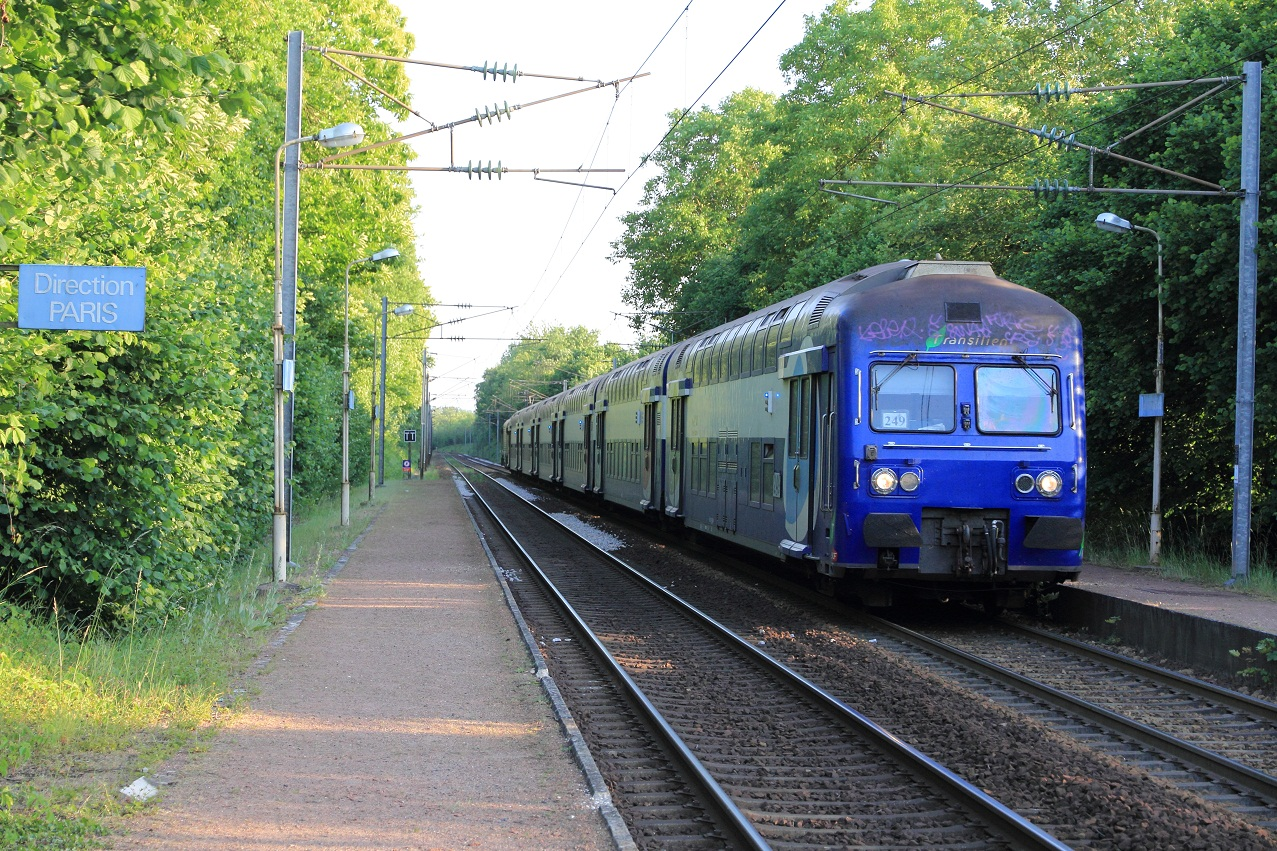

Overview
- Termini: Paris-Saint-Lazare; Ermont–Eaubonne Gisors Vernon–Giverny
- Stations: 54

Service
- Type: Commuter rail
- System: Transilien
- Operator: SNCF
- Rolling stock: Z 50000; BB 27300 + VB 2N

History
- Opened: 26 July 1837 (first sections); 31 December 2004 (recreated as Line J)

Technical
- Line length: 256 km (159 mi)
- Track gauge: 1,435 mm (4 ft 8 1/2 in) standard gauge
Route map

The trains on Line J travel between Gare Saint-Lazare in Paris and the north-west of Île-de-France region, with termini in Ermont–Eaubonne, Gisors and Vernon. The line has a total of 260,000 passengers per weekday.

=== List of Line J stations ===
==== Gisors Branch ====
- Paris-Saint-Lazare
- Asnières-sur-Seine station
- Bois-Colombes station
- Colombes station
- Le Stade station
- Argenteuil station
- Val d'Argenteuil station
- Cormeilles-en-Parisis station
- La Frette–Montigny station
- Herblay station
- Conflans-Sainte-Honorine station
- Éragny–Neuville station
- Saint-Ouen-l'Aumône-Quartier de l'Église station
- Pontoise station
- Osny station
- Boissy-l'Aillerie station
- Montgeroult–Courcelles station
- Us station
- Santeuil–Le Perchay station
- Chars station
- Lavilletertre station
- Liancourt-Saint-Pierre station
- Chaumont-en-Vexin station
- Trie-Château station
- Gisors station

==== Ermont Branch ====
- same route as the Gisors line between Paris-Saint-Lazare and Argenteuil
- Sannois station
- Ermont–Eaubonne station

==== Mantes Branch ====
- same route as the Gisors line between Paris-Saint-Lazare and Conflans-Sainte-Honorine
- Conflans-Fin-d'Oise station
- Maurecourt station
- Andrésy station
- Chanteloup-les-Vignes station
- Triel-sur-Seine station
- Vaux-sur-Seine station
- Thun-le-Paradis station
- Meulan–Hardricourt station
- Juziers station
- Gargenville station
- Issou–Porcheville station
- Limay station
- Mantes-Station station
- Mantes-la-Jolie station

==== Poissy-Vernon Branch ====
- Paris-Saint-Lazare
- Houilles–Carrières-sur-Seine station
- Sartrouville station
- Maisons-Laffitte station
- Poissy station
- Villennes-sur-Seine station
- Vernouillet–Verneuil station
- Les Clairières de Verneuil station
- Les Mureaux station
- Aubergenville-Élisabethville station
- Épône–Mézières station
- Mantes-Station station
- Mantes-la-Jolie station
- Rosny-sur-Seine station
- Bonnières station
- Vernon–Giverny station

=== Services ===
Line J utilises four-letter codes, called a mission code or the name of service. The four-letter code begins with a letter that designates the terminus of the station.

The first letter designates the train's destination.

- A: Argenteuil
- C: Conflans Sainte-Honorine
- E: Ermont-Eaubonne
- G: Gisors
- H: Houilles Carrières-sur-Seine
- J: Vernon
- K: Cormeilles-en-Parisis
- L: Les Mureaux
- M: Mantes-la-Jolie
- P: Paris Saint-Lazare
- T: Pontoise
- V: Vernon
- Y: Boissy-l'Aillerie

The second, third and fourth letters indicate the stations served by the train. Formerly, the second letter was used to designate the train type (I for express trains, A for semi-express trains, O for local trains), but this is no longer the case (but most all stops trains of Line J keep the O as the second letter). The third letter was also used to designate the route taken to the destination (for example C as a third letter indicates "via Conflans Sainte-Honorine"), but this is now abolished along with the second letter. Typically, mission codes or the name of services of line J have the following composition of destination, vowel, consonant, vowel (CARA, GENE, MOLE, PALE, TOCA, etc.) but only four codes follow the pattern of destination, vowel, consonant, consonant (PACK, PANS, TANS and VERN).

Table of names of services as of 2026
Destination	Names of services
Conflans-Sainte-Honorine	CARA, COKA, COPO
Ermont – Eaubonne	EAPE
Gisors	GEMA, GETA, GENE, GEXI, GOCA, GULE
Les Mureaux	LOLA
Mantes-la-Jolie	MALA, MELU, MICE, MOCA, MOGA, MOLE
Paris-Saint-Lazare	PACA, PACE, PACK, PACY, PALE, PAMA, PANS, PANU, PAPE, PARA, PATO, PAVE, PECU, PECE, PELE, PEMA, PENA, PENE, PENU, PERA, PETA, PICA, PICU, PILA, PILE, POCA, POCI, POLA, POCO, POLO, PUCA, PUCE
Pontoise	TANS, TOCA, TORA
Vernon – Giverny	JOLE, VERN
Boissy-l'Aillerie	YECE, YECU, YOLA

== Line L ==
Line L

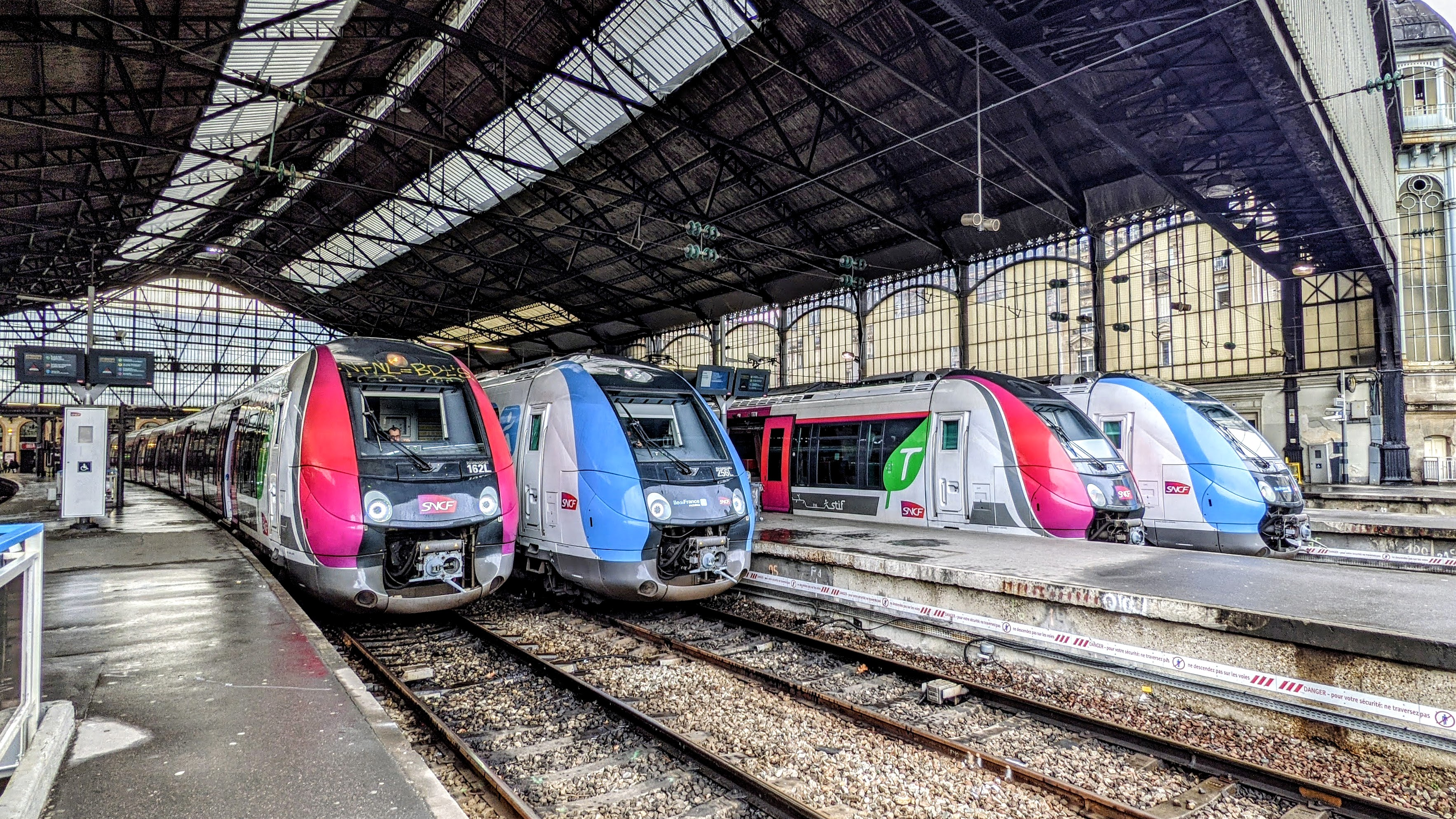

Overview
- Termini: Paris-Saint-Lazare; Cergy-le-Haut Saint-Nom-la-Bretèche–Forêt de Marly Versailles-Rive Droite
- Stations: 36

Service
- Type: Commuter rail
- System: Transilien
- Operator: SNCF
- Rolling stock: Z 50000

History
- Opened: 26 July 1837 (first sections); 31 December 2004 (recreated as Line L)

Technical
- Line length: 76 km (47 mi)
- Track gauge: 1,435 mm (4 ft 8 1/2 in) standard gauge
Route map

The trains on Line L travel between Gare Saint-Lazare in Paris and the west of Île-de-France region, with termini in Cergy, Versailles and L'Étang-la-Ville. The line has a total of 290,000 passengers per weekday.

=== List of Line L stations ===
==== Cergy Branch ====
- Paris-Saint Lazare
- Pont Cardinet
- Clichy–Levallois
- Asnières-sur-Seine
- Bécon-les-Bruyères
- Les Vallées
- La Garenne-Colombes
- Nanterre-Université
- Houilles–Carrières-sur-Seine
- Sartrouville
- Maisons-Laffitte
- Achères-Ville
- Conflans-Fin-d'Oise
- Neuville-Université
- Cergy-Préfecture
- Cergy-Saint-Christophe
- Cergy-le-Haut

==== Saint-Nom-la-Bretèche Branch ====
- Same route as the Cergy line between Paris–Saint Lazare and Bécon-les-Bruyères
- Courbevoie
- La Défense
- Puteaux
- Suresnes–Mont-Valérien
- Le Val d'Or
- Saint-Cloud
- Garches–Marnes-la-Coquette
- Vaucresson
- La Celle-Saint-Cloud
- Bougival
- Louveciennes
- Marly-le-Roi
- L'Étang-la-Ville
- Saint-Nom-la-Bretèche–Forêt de Marly

==== Versailles Branch ====
- Same route as the Saint-Nom-la-Bretèche line between Paris–Saint Lazare and Saint-Cloud
- Sèvres–Ville-d'Avray
- Chaville Rive Droite
- Viroflay Rive Droite
- Montreuil
- Versailles Rive Droite

=== Services ===
A four-letter code system is in use throughout Line L. These codes do not display on trains, but they are displayed on passenger information display systems.

The destination of the train is indicated by the first letter.

- B: Bécon-les-Bruyères
- D: Saint-Cloud
- F: Maisons-Laffitte
- N: Nanterre-Université
- P: Paris Saint-Lazare
- R: Marly-le-Roi
- S: Saint-Nom-la-Bretèche–Forêt de Marly
- U: Cergy-le-Haut
- V: Versailles-Rive Droite

The train type is indicated by the second letter.

- O: All stops
- A: Semi-express
- I: Limited stops
- U or E: Uses other stopping patterns

The route taken to the destination is indicated by the third letter.

- A: Asnières sur Seine
- B: Bécon-les-Bruyères
- C: Clichy–Levallois
- L: La Défense or Les Vallées
- M: Nanterre-Université
- P: Pont Cardinet

The fourth letter has no meaning, but it acts as a "padding" letter in order to make the code pronounceable.

Table of names of services as of 2026
Destination	Names of services
Maisons-Laffitte	FOPE
Nanterre-Université	NOPE
Paris-Saint-Lazare	PALS, PASA, PEBU, PEGE, POPI, POPU, POSA, POVA, POPE
Saint-Nom-la-Bretèche–Forêt de Marly	SILS, SEBU, SOPA
Cergy-le-Haut	UEGE, UOPY
Versailles-Rive Droite	VOLA, VASA

== See also ==
- List of Transilien stations
- Paris-Saint-Lazare to Saint-Germain-en-Laye Line
