= Houilles–Carrières-sur-Seine station =

Railway station in Paris, France

Houilles Carrières-sur-Seine
- Houilles–Carrières-sur-Seine station platforms

General information
- Location: 1 Rue du 4 Septembre; Houilles; France
- Coordinates: 48°55′16″N 2°11′02″E
- Operator: SNCF
- Line: Paris–Le Havre railway
- Platforms: 2 side platforms
- Tracks: 2

Construction
- Accessible: RER A & Transilien L: Yes, by prior reservation; Transilien J: No

Other information
- Station code: 87386409
- Fare zone: 4

History
- Opened: 1843

Passengers
- 2024: 18,250,565

Services
Preceding station	RER	Following station
Sartrouville towards Cergy-le-Haut or Poissy	RER A	Nanterre-Préfecture towards Marne-la-Vallée–Chessy
Preceding station	Transilien	Following station
Poissy towards Vernon–Giverny	Line J	Paris–Saint Lazare Terminus
Sartrouville towards Cergy-le-Haut	Line L	Nanterre-Université towards Paris–Saint Lazare
Location

Houilles–Carrières-sur-Seine station (French: Gare de Houilles-Carrières-sur-Seine) is a railway station in Houilles, a suburb of Paris, on the Paris–Le Havre railway. Trains arrive at the station from Gare Saint-Lazare and the RER.

== See also ==
- List of stations of the Paris RER
