= Vernon–Giverny station =

Railway station in Vernon, France

Coordinates: 49°5′28″N 1°28′42″E

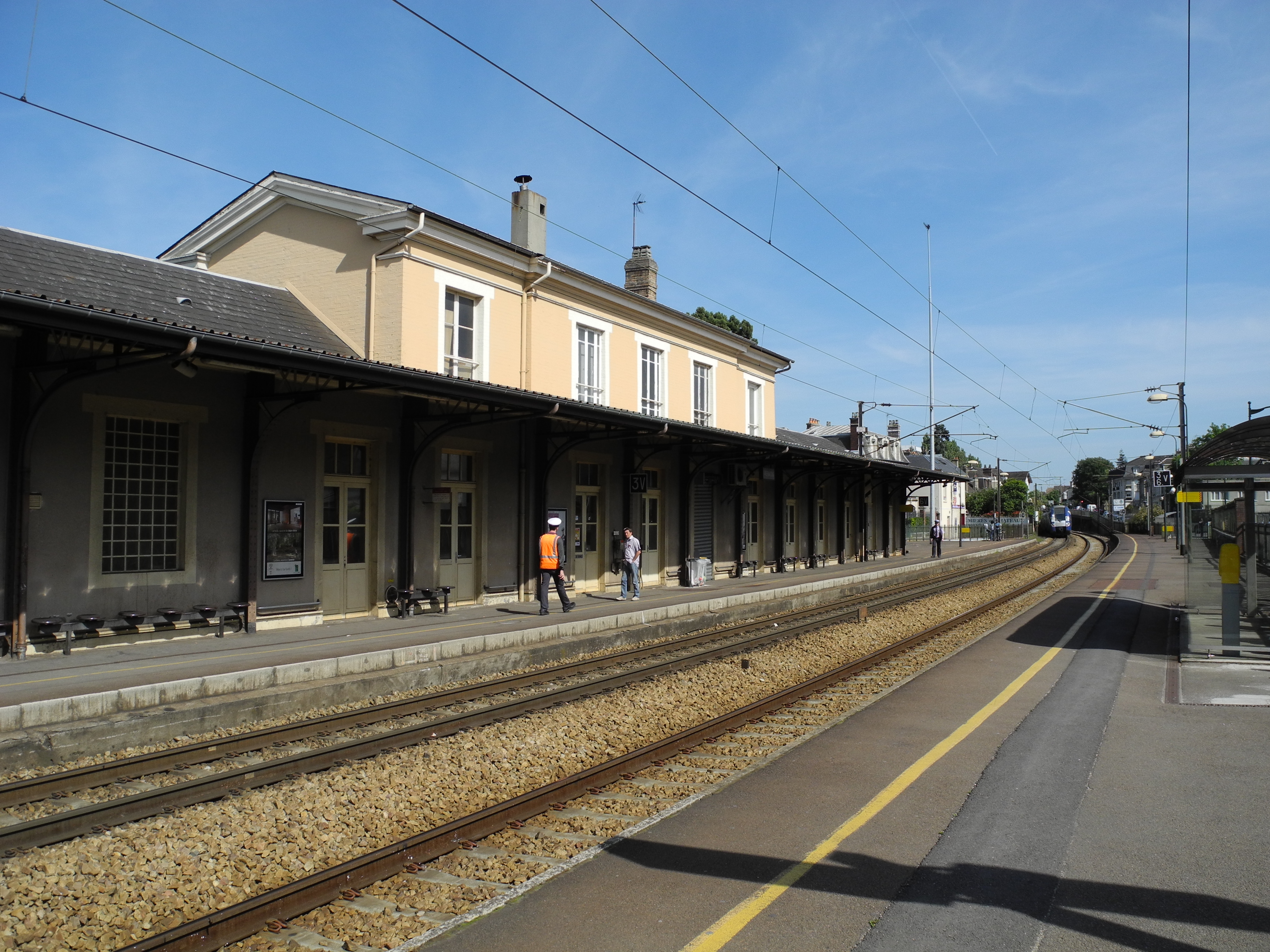
Platforms

Vernon - Giverny (before 2014: Vernon) is a railway station serving the town Vernon, Eure department, northwestern France. It is situated on the Paris–Le Havre railway.

== Services ==
The station is served by regional trains to Rouen and Paris.

Preceding station	TER Normandie	Following station
Gaillon-Aubevoye towards Rouen-RD	Citi	Bonnières towards Paris-Saint-Lazare
Preceding station	Transilien	Following station
Bonnières towards Paris-St.-Lazare	Line J	Terminus
