= Paris–Le Havre railway =

Railway in Northwest France

Paris–Le Havre railway Ligne Paris–Le Havre
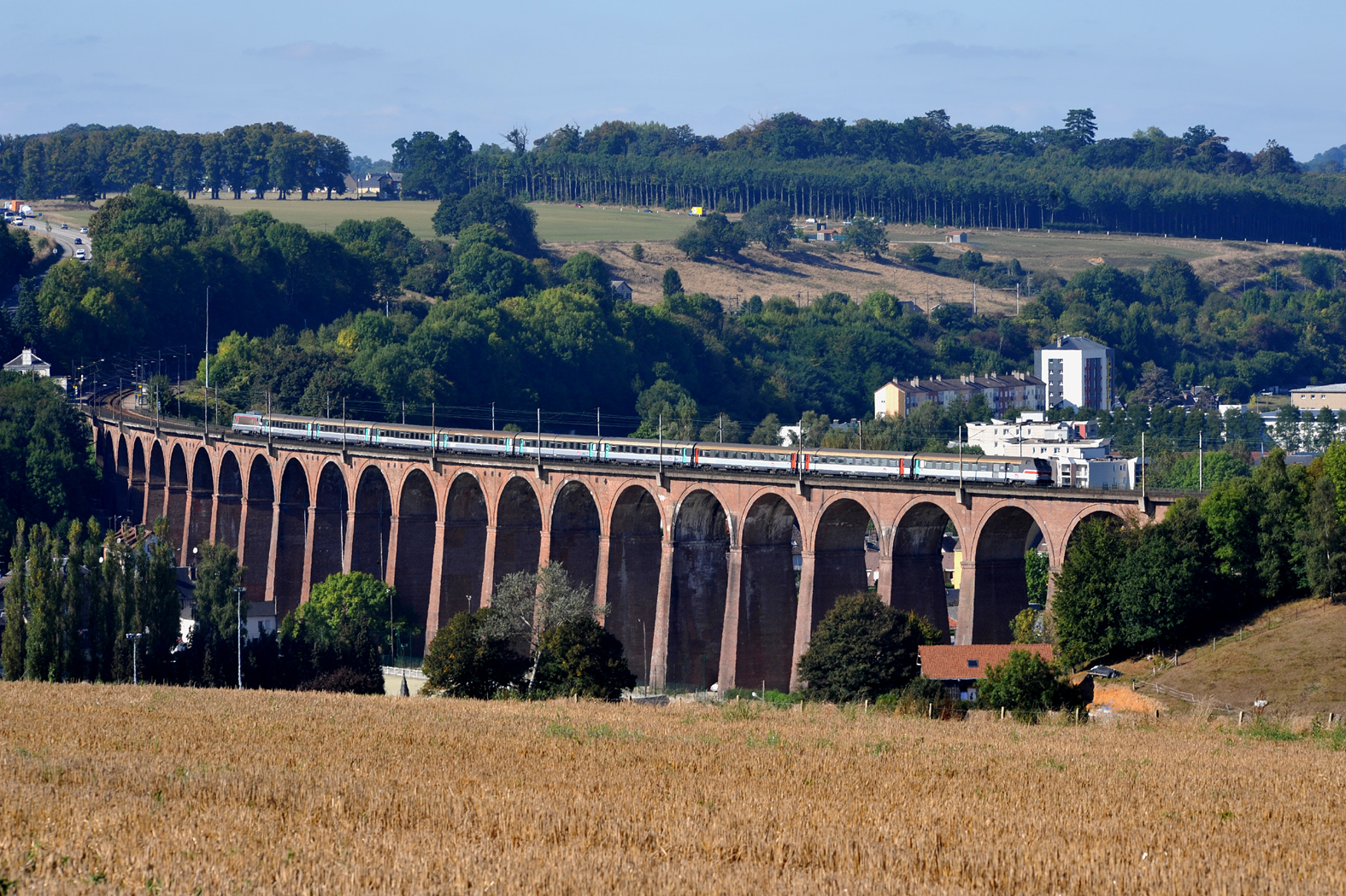
- The Barentin Viaduct, also known as the Pont Austreberthe, on the Paris–Le Havre railway

Overview
- Status: Operational
- Owner: RFF
- Locale: France (Île-de-France, Normandy)
- Termini: Gare Saint-Lazare, Paris; Le Havre station

Service
- System: SNCF
- Operator: SNCF

History
- Opened: 1843-1847

Technical
- Line length: 228 km (142 mi)
- Number of tracks: Double track
- Track gauge: 1,435 mm (4 ft 8 1/2 in) standard gauge
- Electrification: 25 kV 50 Hz
- Operating speed: 160 km/h (99 mph)

The Paris–Le Havre railway is an important 228-kilometre long railway line, that connects Paris to the northwestern port city Le Havre via Rouen. Among the first railway lines in France, the section from Paris to Rouen opened on 9 May 1843, followed by the section from Rouen to Le Havre that opened on 22 March 1847.

== Route ==
The Paris–Le Havre line leaves the Gare Saint-Lazare in Paris in northwestern direction. It crosses the river Seine at Asnières-sur-Seine, and again at Houilles. After Poissy it follows the left bank of the Seine. At Mantes-la-Jolie, the line to Caen and Cherbourg branches off. Between Rolleboise and Bonnières-sur-Seine, and again between Aubevoye and Venables large meanders of the Seine are bypassed.

Near Rouen, the Seine is crossed at Le Manoir, at Oissel and at Sotteville-lès-Rouen. After crossing central Rouen and the main station Rouen-Rive-Droite, it climbs in northwestern direction onto the Pays de Caux plateau. At Motteville it turns west, crosses the town Yvetot and descends to the Seine estuary. After a total length of 228 km, it reaches its terminus Le Havre station.

=== Main stations ===
The main stations on the Paris–Le Havre railway are:

- Gare Saint-Lazare (Paris)
- Mantes-la-Jolie station
- Rouen-Rive-Droite station
- Le Havre station

== History ==
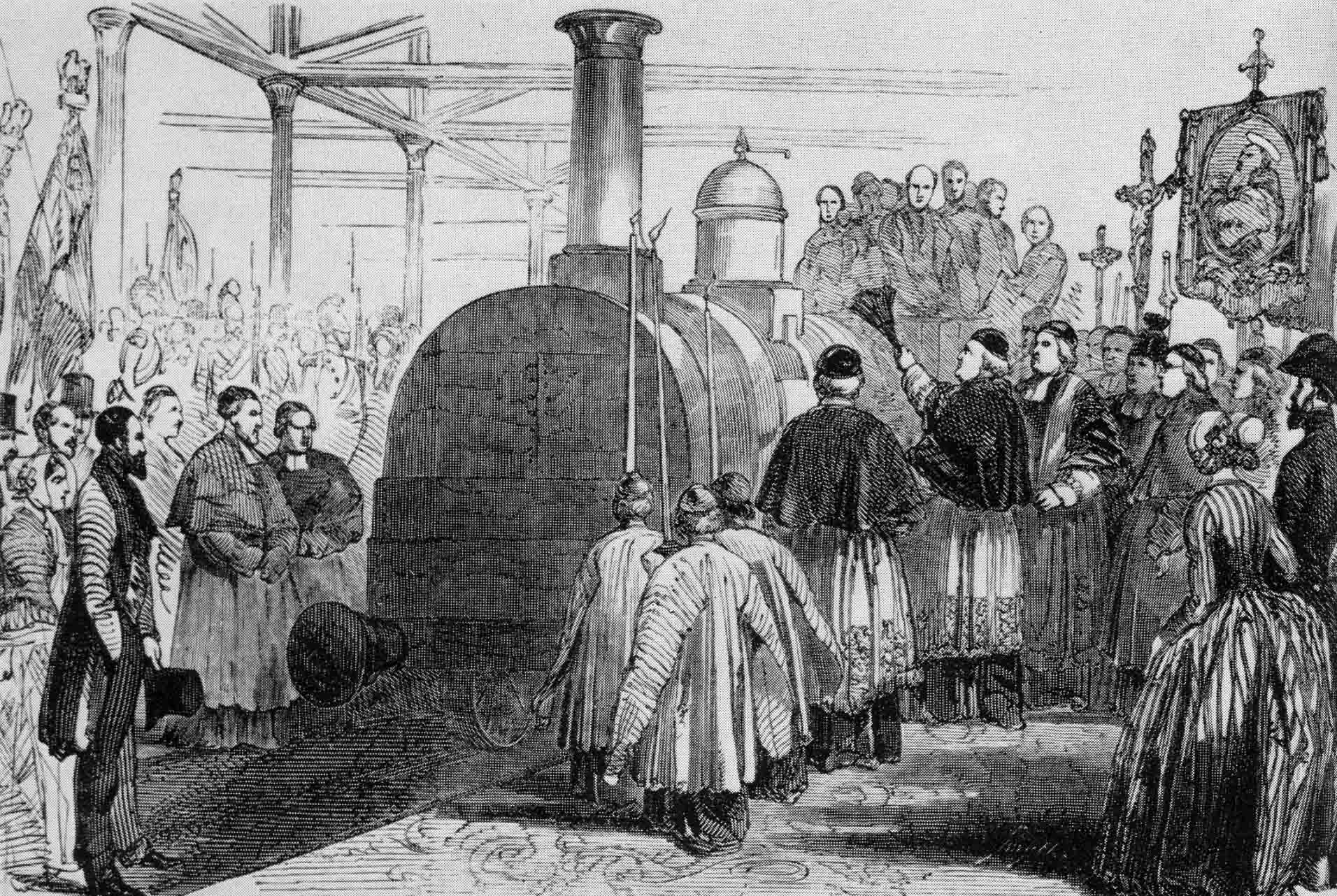
Opening ceremony of the Rouen and Le Havre Railway

Following the success of the early railways in Britain, France was encouraged to develop a railway network, in part, to link with the railway system in Britain. To this end the Paris and Rouen Railway Company was established, and Joseph Locke was appointed as its engineer. Determining that bids submitted by French contractors were too expensive, he suggested that British contractors should be invited to tender. Thomas Brassey and William MacKenzie, two British contractors, jointly tendered an offer, which was accepted in 1841. (Between 1841 and 1844, Brassey and Mackenzie won contracts to build four French railways, including the Orléans and Bordeaux Railway.)

In January 1846, during construction of the 58-mile (93 km) long Rouen and Le Havre line, one of the few major structural disasters of Brassey's contracting career occurred, the collapse of the Barentin Viaduct. The 100 feet (30 m) high viaduct that crosses the Austreberthe River was built of brick at a cost of about £50,000. The reason for the collapse was never established, but a possible cause was the nature of the lime used to make the mortar. The contract stipulated that this had to be obtained locally, and the collapse occurred after a few days of heavy rain. Brassey rebuilt the viaduct at his own expense, this time using lime of his own choice. The rebuilt viaduct still stands and remains in use today.

The section from Paris–Rouen had been completed a few years earlier by two different firms, but both parts were united and became part of Chemins de Fer de l'Ouest in 1855. The first 8 km of the railway, until La Garenne-Colombes, are shared with the line to Le Pecq that was opened in 1837 and extended to Saint-Germain-en-Laye in 1847. The original terminus of the railway was the Rouen Saint-Sever station on the left bank of the Seine. When the line was extended to Le Havre in 1847, a new station was built on the right bank of the Seine, the Rouen-Rive-Droite station (originally: Gare de Rouen-Rue Verte).

== Services ==
The Paris–Le Havre railway is used by the following passenger services:

- TGV on the section between Épône - Mézières and Le Havre
- Intercités from Paris to Le Havre and from Paris to Dieppe
- TER Normandie regional services on the whole line
- Transilien regional services on the section between Paris and Vernon
- RER A Paris rapid transit on the section between Nanterre and Poissy

== Cultural references ==
The Paris–Le Havre railway plays a central part in Jean Renoir's 1938 film La Bête Humaine (The Human Beast), starring Jean Gabin.

The line is extensively referred to in "Maigret" season 1 episode 2, starring Rowan Atkinson. A mystery suspect 'travelled from Paris to Goderville on the slow train to Le Harve, a journey which nobody makes.'

The story of the building of the Rouen-Le Havre railway, including the collapse of the Barentin viaduct, is told in the short story 'Junction' by Julian Barnes. This story is in the collection Cross Channel (1996)

== Bibliography ==
- Haynes, Doug (2006), "The Life and Work of Thomas Brassey", Cheshire History, 45: 57–66, ISSN 0141-8696.
- Helps, Arthur (2006) [1872], The Life and Works of Mr Brassey, Stroud: Nonsuch, ISBN 1-84588-011-0
- Stacey, Tom (2005), Thomas Brassey: The Greatest Railway Builder in the World, London: Stacey International, ISBN 1-905299-09-5
