= Gare Saint-Lazare =

Terminal railway station in Paris, France

Paris Saint-Lazare
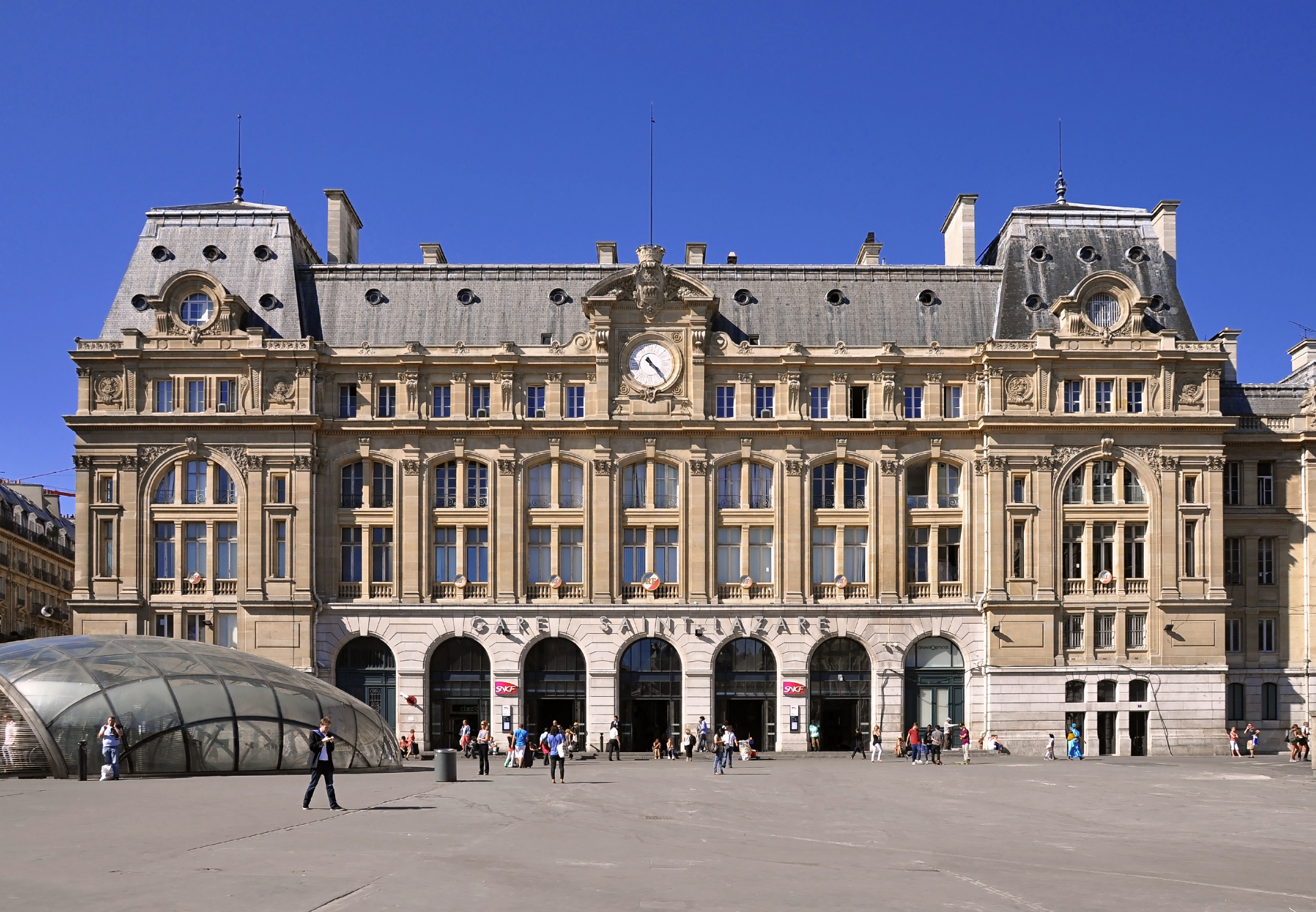
- West entrance

General information
- Location: 13 Rue d'Amsterdam; Paris; France
- Coordinates: 48°52′37″N 2°19′28″E
- Operator: SNCF
- Line: Paris–Le Havre railway
- Platforms: 27
- Connections: at Métro station; at Haussmann–Saint-Lazare

Construction
- Architect: Juste Lisch

Other information
- Station code: 87384008
- Fare zone: 1

History
- Opened: 26 August 1837
- Rebuilt: 1842–1853, 1885–1889
- Electrified: 1960s
- Former names: Embarcadère des Batignolles

Passengers
- 2024: 114,093,491
- Rank: 2nd in France

Services
| Preceding station | Transilien | Following station |
|---|---|---|
| Asnières-sur-Seine towards Ermont–Eaubonne, Gisors or Mantes-la-Jolie | Line J | Terminus |
| Houilles–Carrières-sur-Seine towards Vernon–Giverny | Line J | Terminus |
| Pont Cardinet towards Cergy-le-Haut, Saint-Nom-la-Bretèche or Versailles–Rive Droite | Line L | Terminus |
| Preceding station | TER Normandie | Following station |
| Terminus | Krono+ | Rouen-RD towards Le Havre |
| Terminus | Krono+ | Évreux-Normandie towards Cherbourg |
| Terminus | Krono+ Paris–Trouville-Deauvzille | Évreux-Normandie towards |
| Mantes-la-Jolie towards Rouen-RD | Citi | Terminus |
| Mantes-la-Jolie towards Serquigny | Citi | Terminus |
Connections to other stations
| Preceding station | RER | Following station |
|---|---|---|
| Charles de Gaulle–Étoile towards Saint-Germain-en-Laye, Cergy-le-Haut or Poissy | RER A transfer at Auber | Châtelet–Les Halles towards Boissy-Saint-Léger or Marne-la-Vallée–Chessy |
| Neuilly–Porte Maillot towards Nanterre–La Folie | RER E transfer at Haussmann–Saint-Lazare | Magenta towards Chelles–Gournay or Tournan |
| Preceding station | Paris Metro | Following station |
| Europe towards Pont de Levallois–Bécon | Line 3 transfer at Saint-Lazare | Havre–Caumartin towards Gallieni |
| Miromesnil towards Pont de Sèvres | Line 9 transfer at Saint-Augustin | Havre–Caumartin towards Mairie de Montreuil |
| Madeleine towards Mairie d'Issy | Line 12 transfer at Saint-Lazare | Trinité–d'Estienne d'Orves towards Mairie d'Aubervilliers |
| Miromesnil towards Châtillon–Montrouge | Line 13 transfer at Saint-Lazare | Liège towards Les Courtilles or Saint-Denis–Université |
| Pont Cardinet towards Saint-Denis–Pleyel | Line 14 transfer at Saint-Lazare | Madeleine towards Aéroport d'Orly |
Location

The Gare Saint-Lazare (French pronunciation: [ɡaʁ sɛ̃ lazaʁ]; lit. 'Saint Lazarus station'), officially Paris Saint Lazare, is one of the seven large mainline railway station terminals in Paris, France. It was the first railway station built in Paris, opening in 1837. It mostly serves train services to western suburbs, as well as intercity services toward Normandy using the Paris–Le Havre railway. Saint-Lazare is the third busiest station in France, after the Gare du Nord and Gare de Lyon. It handles 290,000 passengers each day. The current station building opened in 1889 and was designed by architect Juste Lisch; the maître d'œuvre (general contractor) was Eugène Flachat.

== History ==
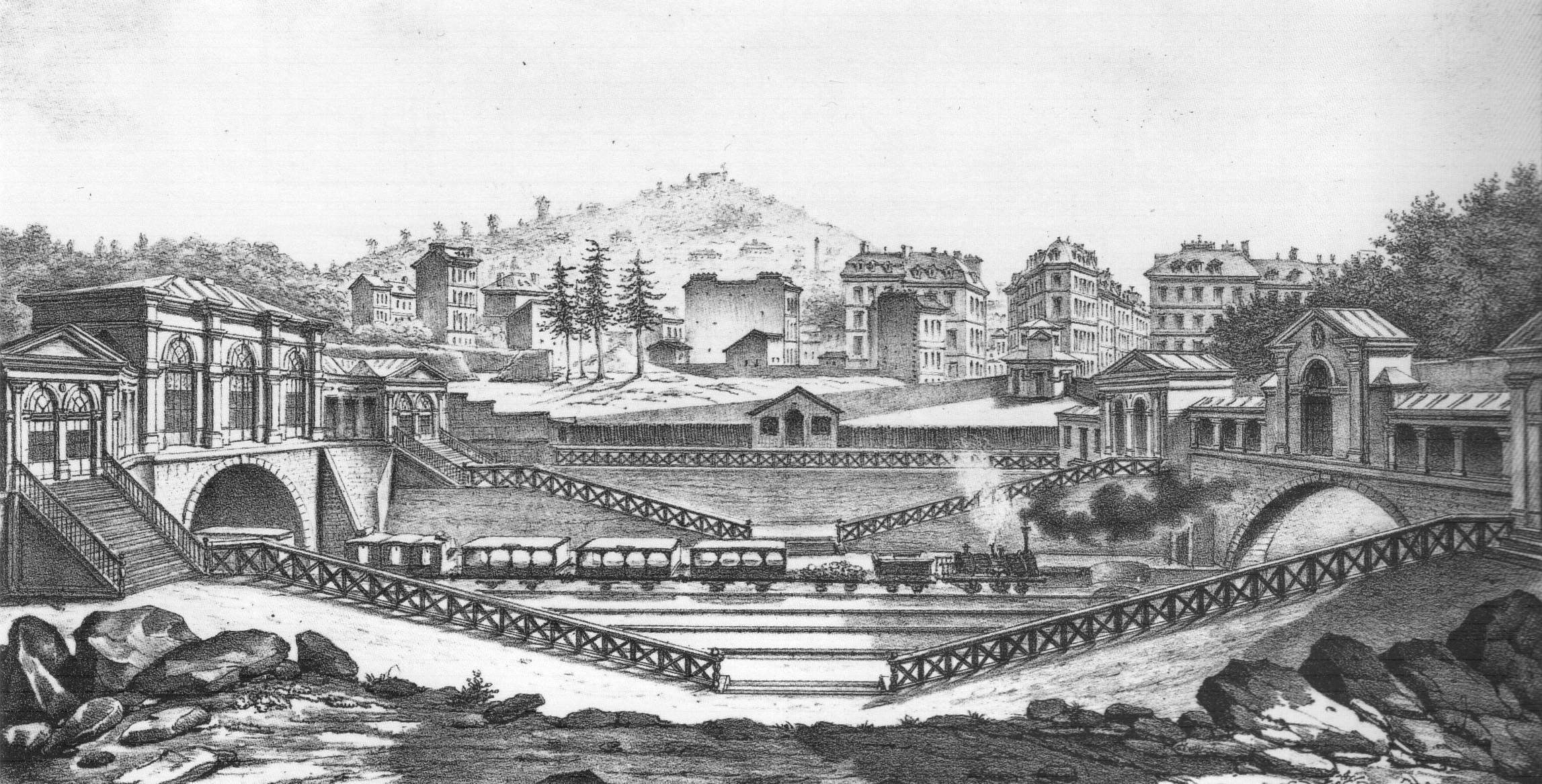
"Embarcadère de l'Europe", drawn by Victor Hubert, 1837

The first station at Saint Lazare was 200 metres (656 ft) northwest of its current position, called Embarcadère des Batignolles. The station was opened by Marie-Amélie (wife of Louis-Philippe of France) on 24 August 1837. The first line served was the single track line to Le Pecq. In 1843 St-Lazare was the terminus for three lines; by 1900 this number had tripled. The station had 14 tracks in 1854 after several enlargements, and now has 27 tracks sorted in six destination groups.

On 27 April 1924 the inner suburban lines were electrified with 750 V DC third rail. The same lines were re-electrified at 25 kV 50 Hz AC overhead wires in the 1960s.

On 21 March 2012, a new three-level shopping mall with 80 shops opened inside the passenger hall.

== Geography ==
The Gare Saint-Lazare is situated in the 8th arrondissement, in a very dense business and shopping area of Paris.

| Located near the Metro stations: Saint-Lazare, Europe, Havre – Caumartin and Saint-Augustin. |

== Gare Saint-Lazare in art and literature ==
Édouard Manet: The Railway, 1873

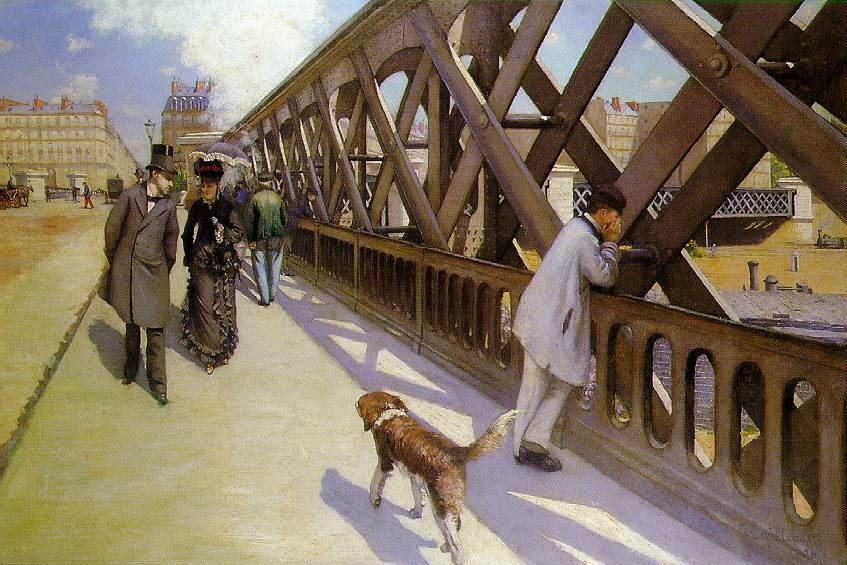
Gustave Caillebotte: Le Pont de l’Europe, 1876

The Gare Saint-Lazare has been represented in a number of artworks. It attracted artists during the Impressionist period and many of them lived very close to the Gare St-Lazare during the 1870s and 1880s.

Édouard Manet lived close by, at 4 rue de Saint-Pétersbourg. Two years after moving to the area he showed his painting The Railway, (also known as Gare Saint-Lazare) at the Paris Salon in 1874. Painted from the backyard of a friend's house on the nearby rue de Rome, this canvas, now in the National Gallery of Art at Washington D.C., portrays a woman with a small dog and a book as she sits facing us in front of an iron fence; a young girl to her left views the railroad track and steam beyond it. At the time of its first exhibition it was caricatured and the subject of ridicule.

Gustave Caillebotte also lived just a short walk away from the station. He painted Le Pont de l’Europe (The Bridge of Europe) in 1876 (now in the Petit Palais, Musée d’Art Moderne in Geneva, Switzerland) and On the Pont de l'Europe in 1876-80 (Kimbell Art Museum, Fort Worth). While the former picture looks across the bridge with the ironworks diagonally crossing the picture to the right, with a scene of partially interacting figures on the bridge to the left, the latter depicts the iron structure of the bridge face-on in a strong close-up of its industrial geometry, with three male figures to the left side of the painting all looking in different directions (the Pont de l'Europe is a massive bridge spanning the railyard of the newly expanded station, which at that time had an iron-work trellis).

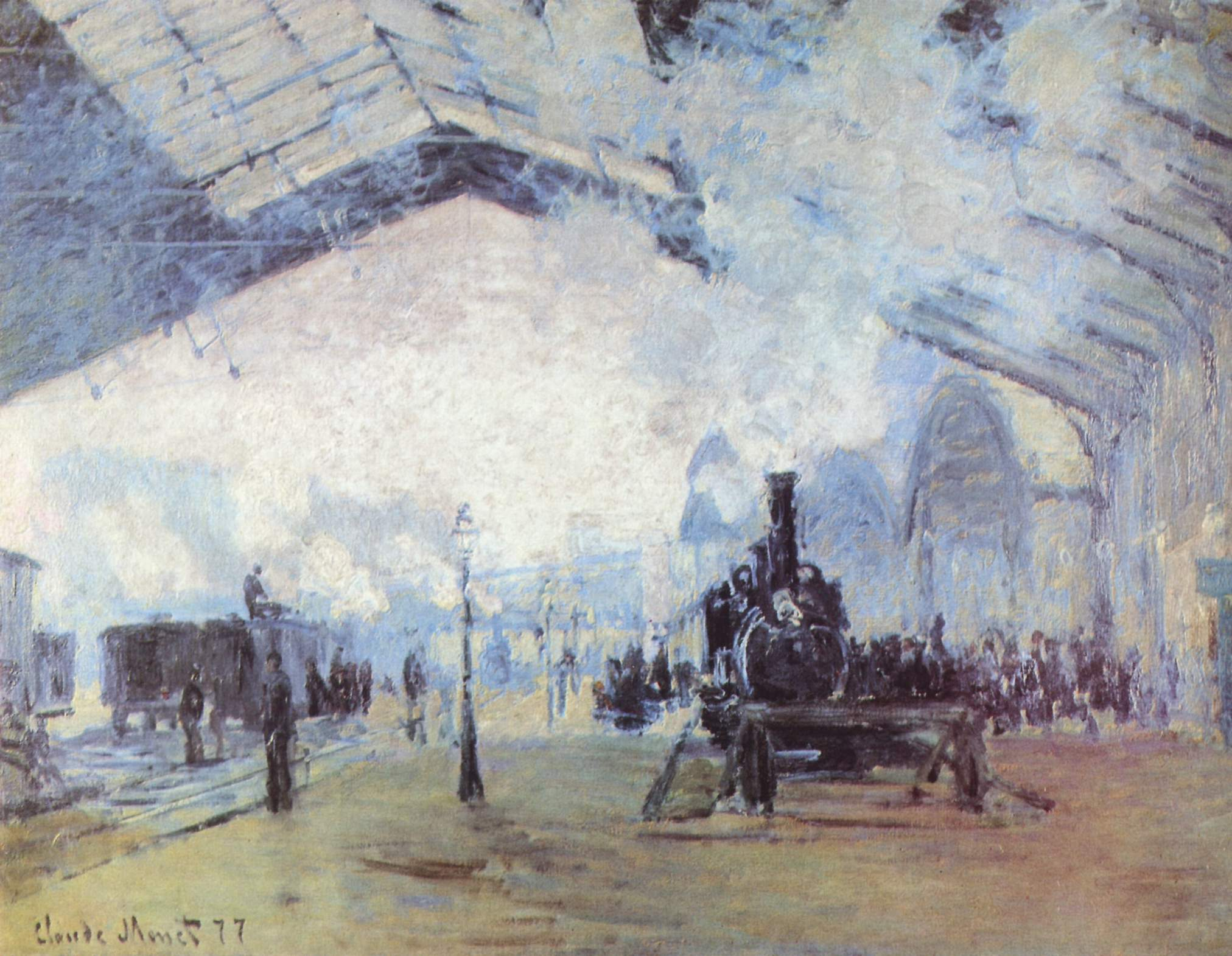
Arrival of the Normandy Train, Gare Saint-Lazare by Claude Monet, c. 1877

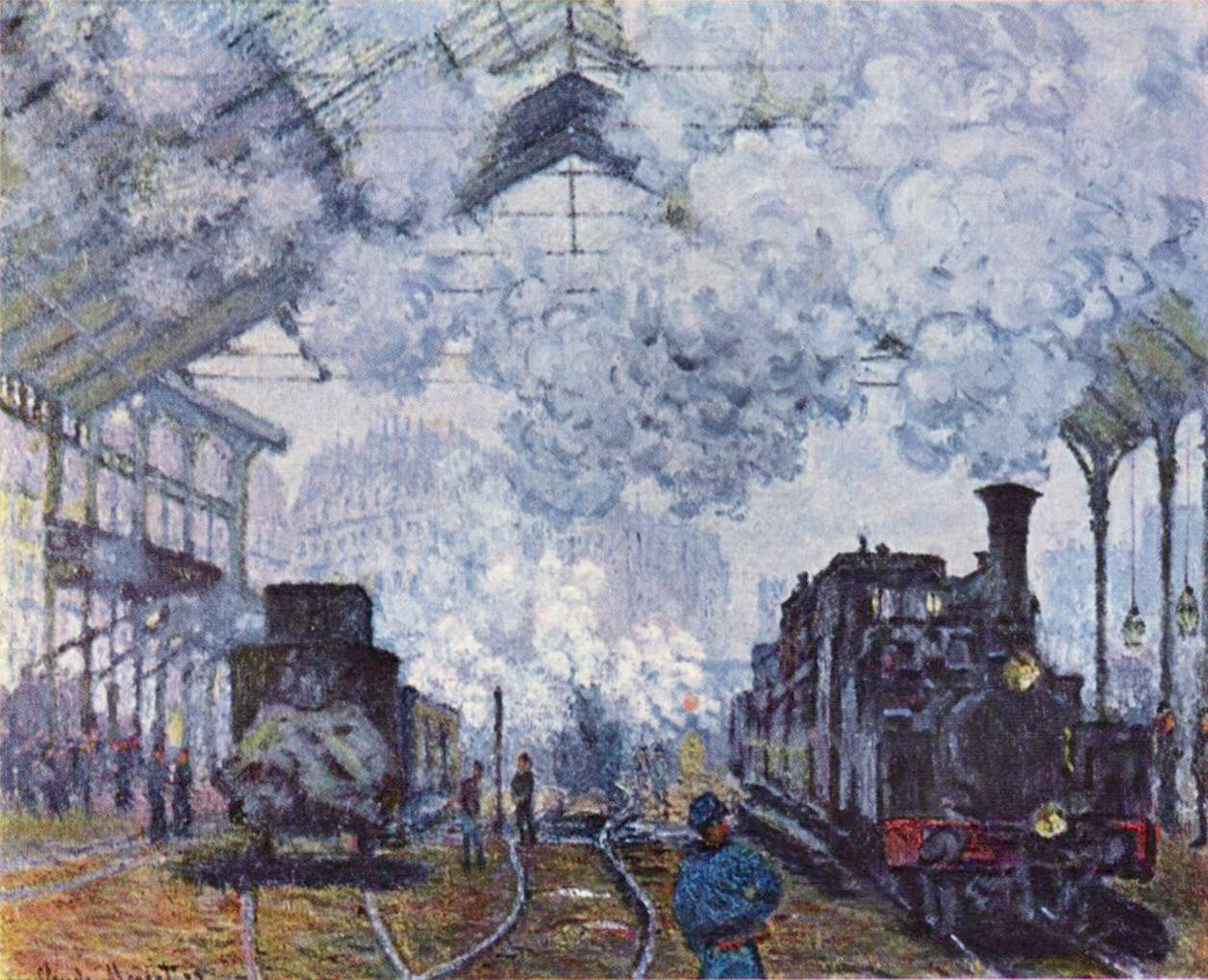
Gare Saint Lazare, Claude Monet, 1877

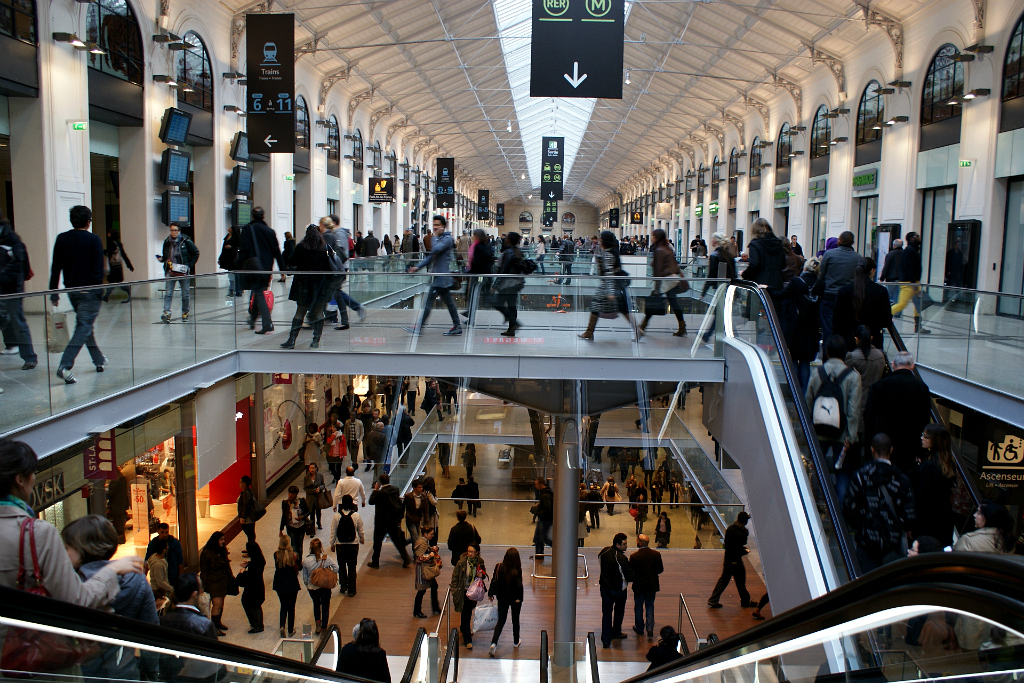
Renovated passenger hall

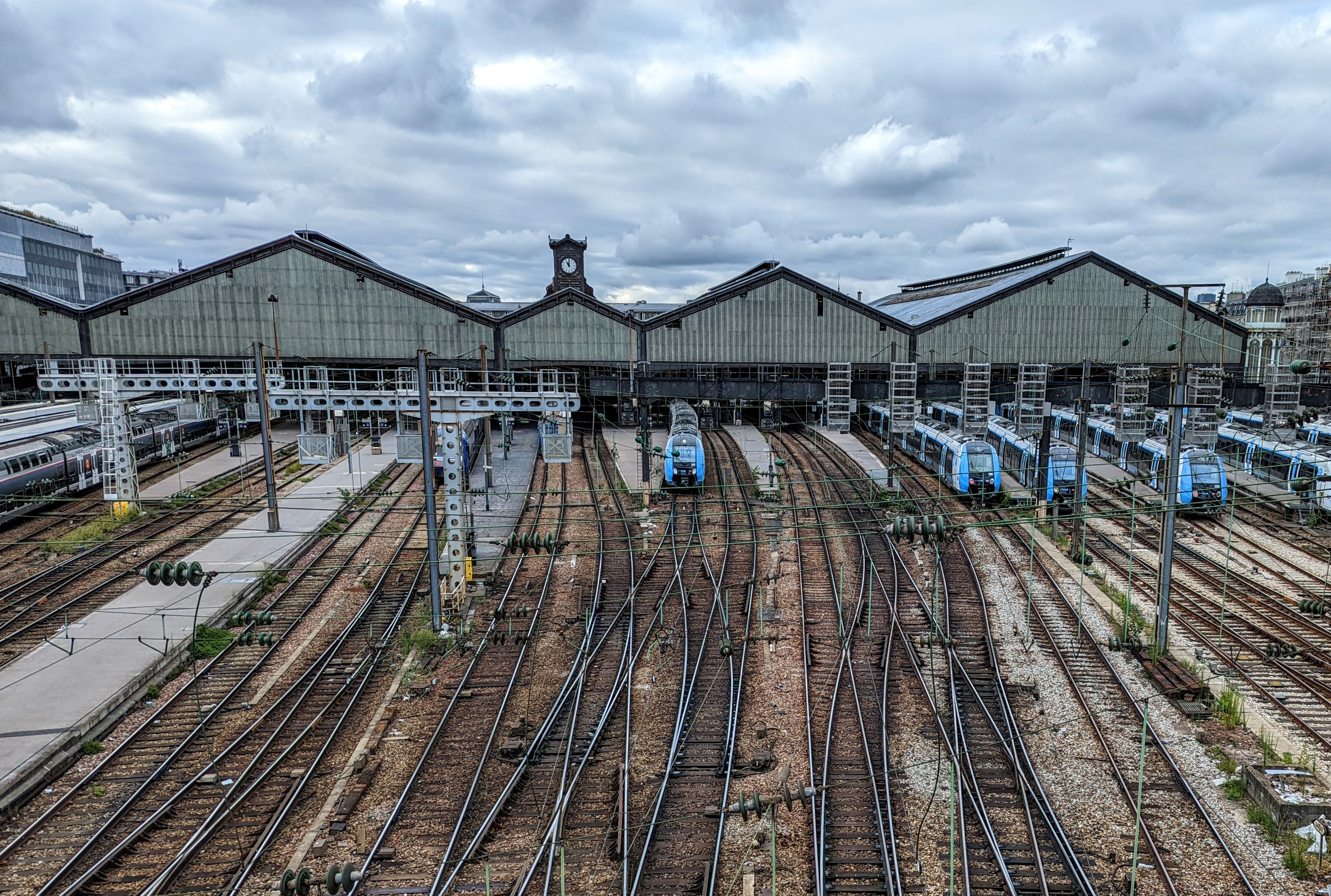
The station from Place de l'Europe

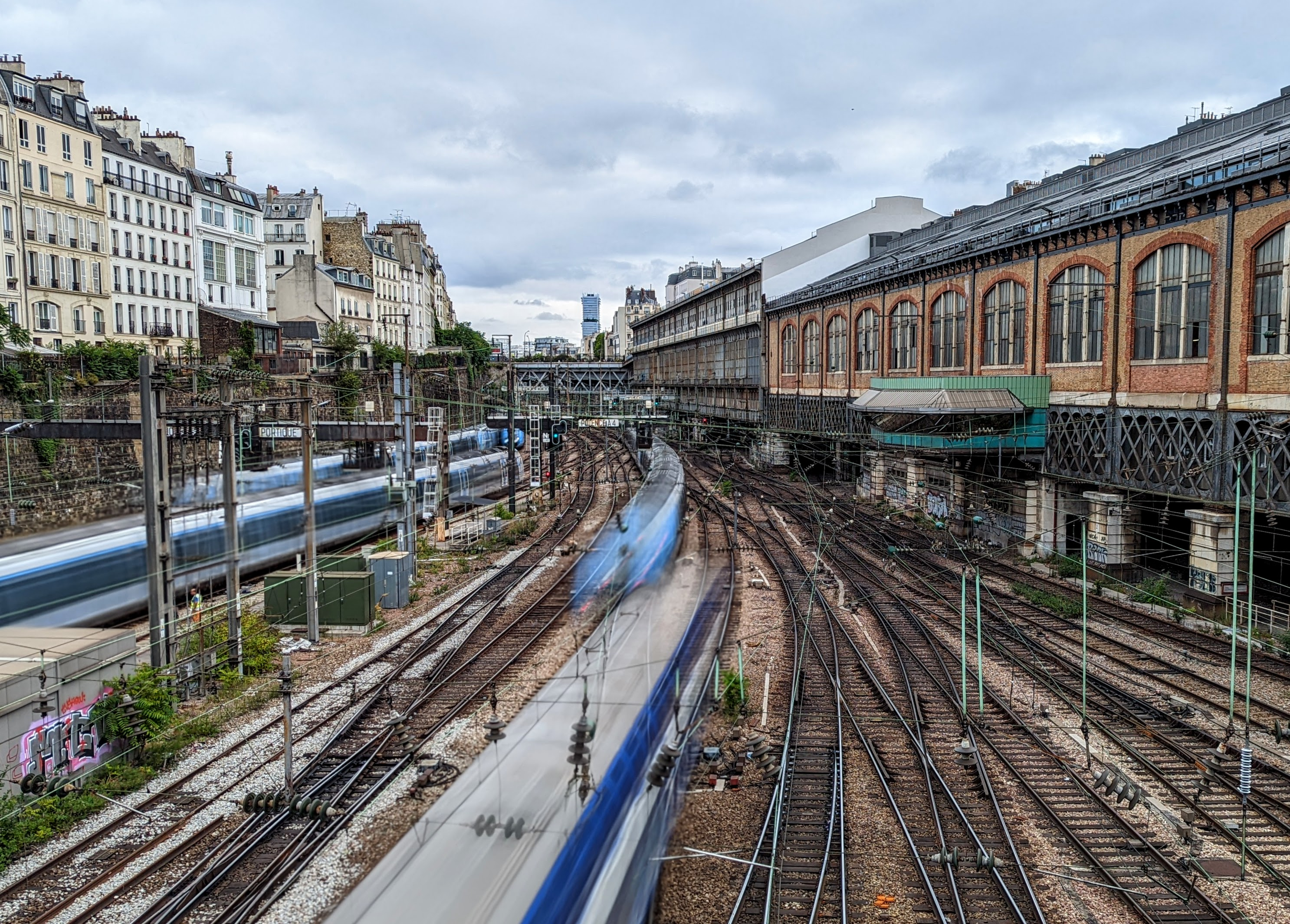
Trains coming and going, looking north from Place de l'Europe

In 1877, painter Claude Monet rented a studio near the Gare Saint Lazare. That same year he exhibited seven paintings of the railway station in an impressionist painting exhibition. He completed 12 paintings of this subject. Oscar-Claude Monet's series of the Gare Saint-Lazare train station was one of his most famous series in his lifetime. Monet was one of the most important and influential painters in the Impressionist movement in the 19th century. He was a strong proponent of plein-air landscape painting. Artists such as Gustave Caillebotte, Edgar Degas and Berthe Morisot, do this in order to accurately portray the scene in the moment instead of creating the painting from what they could remember. Monet and others who followed the Impressionism Movement were not accepted in the Salon de Paris, because of their rejection of the academies' teachings of form, style, subject matter etc., so instead they decided to open a new exhibition on their own Impressionist Exhibition in April 1874.

Claude Monet's depiction of this train station is an astonishing composition in which the hard-edged discs of the railroad signals hover above a rapidly scribbled swirl of blue and rose clouds of steam, with scrolled white edges, while the sketchy, angular drawing of the tracks and buildings provides contrast. The flat, opaque circle of the largest signal, placed dead center and thickly painted, is so insistent that it turns the picture into a near-abstraction. The Gare Saint-Lazare piece was shown at the Third Impressionist Exhibition. The Gare Saint-Lazare is very different from Monet's previous paintings of harbors, boats and oceans that viewers had seen before. The Gare Saint-Lazare series of paintings lead the viewers through a tour of the train station in different points of the day. "Monet exemplifies the modern life, in all its chaos and instability", The steam coming from the trains creates a way of dissolving the train and showing the impressionistic style of blending colors and light. Everything dissipates with the steam of the train and turns into a flurry of blended colors. As said by Émile Zola, "Monet is able to turn a normally dirty and gritty place into a peaceful and beautiful scene…You can hear the trains rumbling in, see the smoke billow up under the huge roofs…that is where painting is today…our artists have to find the poetry in train station, the way their fathers found the poetry in forests and rivers". "Monet’s work on the Gare Saint-Lazare is unparalleled in its evocation of steam and the smoke-filled station. In spite of the impressionist style, the work reproduces accurately the topography of the area, even allowing one to deduce the precise point where the artist was standing while painting. This is the first time an artist had showed a single theme through a series of variations."

The Gare Saint-Lazare itself, a monument to the last word in state-of-the-art transportation, the railroad. Le Quartier de l'Europe, where artists like Claude Monet and Gustave Caillebotte spent a lot of time and painted was, in short, a paradigm of modern Paris; the forward-looking young artists who called it home, and who had consciously dedicated themselves to the interpretation of modern life, included in their work recognizable references to their neighborhood as a sign of both their commitment to the present, with all its irregularities and "unaesthetic" components, and their rejection of the past, with its Academy-sanctioned conventions.

Lesser-known artists who depicted the Gare Saint Lazare were Jean Béraud, who painted The Place and Pont de l'Europe in 1876-78 and Norbert Goeneutte (1854–1894), with a studio providing a very good view of the Pont de l'Europe, who painted this scene many times in the late 1880s. One of these is The Pont de l'Europe and Gare Saint-Lazare from circa 1888 (in the Baltimore Museum).

An engraving showing the Place de l'Europe bridge at the time of its opening in 1868 was made by Auguste Lamy.

In 1932, the wasteland behind the station became the subject of one of the most celebrated photographs of all time, Henri Cartier-Bresson's Derrière la gare de Saint-Lazare. In Raymond Queneau's 1947 book Exercises in Style, the Gare Saint-Lazare serves as the backdrop to much of the story's action. In 1998 the Musée d'Orsay and the National Gallery of Art in Washington, D.C., put on an exhibition called "Manet, Monet, and the Gare Saint-Lazare".

The Gare Saint-Lazare is mentioned or plays a role in Émile Zola's La Bête humaine and Roland Sadaune's Terminus St-Lazare.

The Gare Saint-Lazare is seen in the 1995 film French Kiss with Kevin Kline and Meg Ryan. It is the last scene in Paris where Kevin Kline's character is being chased by Police Inspector Jean-Paul Cardon (Jean Reno) while trying to board a train south to Cannes (which is an inaccuracy since the Gare Saint-Lazare serves the North-West of France; trains for Cannes depart from the Gare de Lyon).

== Services ==
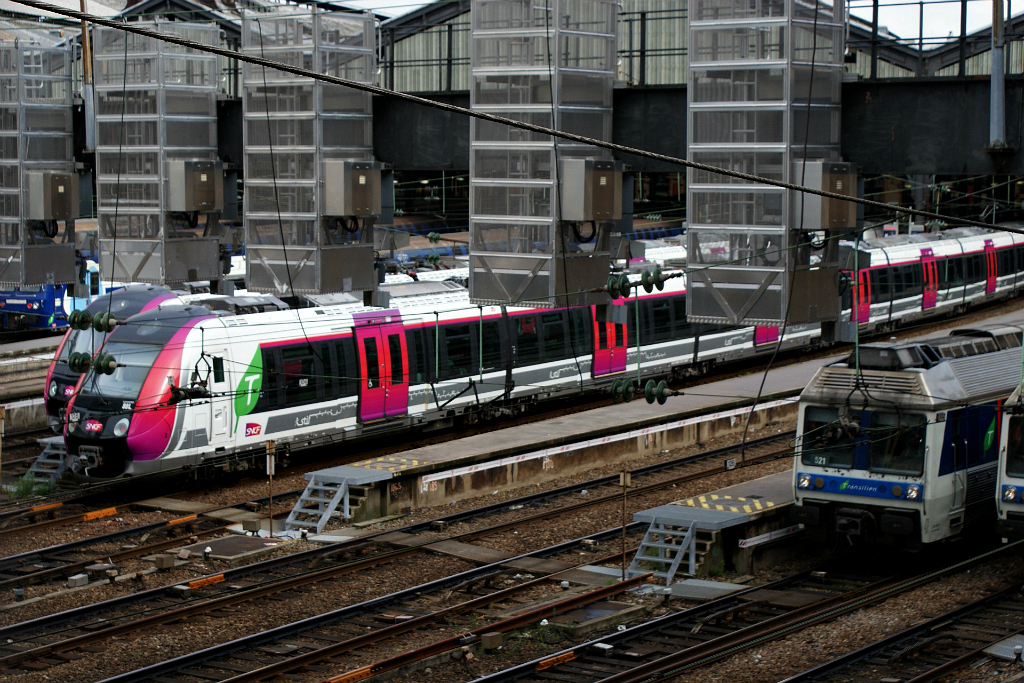
Commuter trains at Saint Lazare

The Gare Saint-Lazare is served by regional TER Normandie trains toward Normandy, as well as regional Transilien trains to the western suburbs of Paris.

1,600 trains serve Gare Saint-Lazare every day.

=== TER Normandie ===
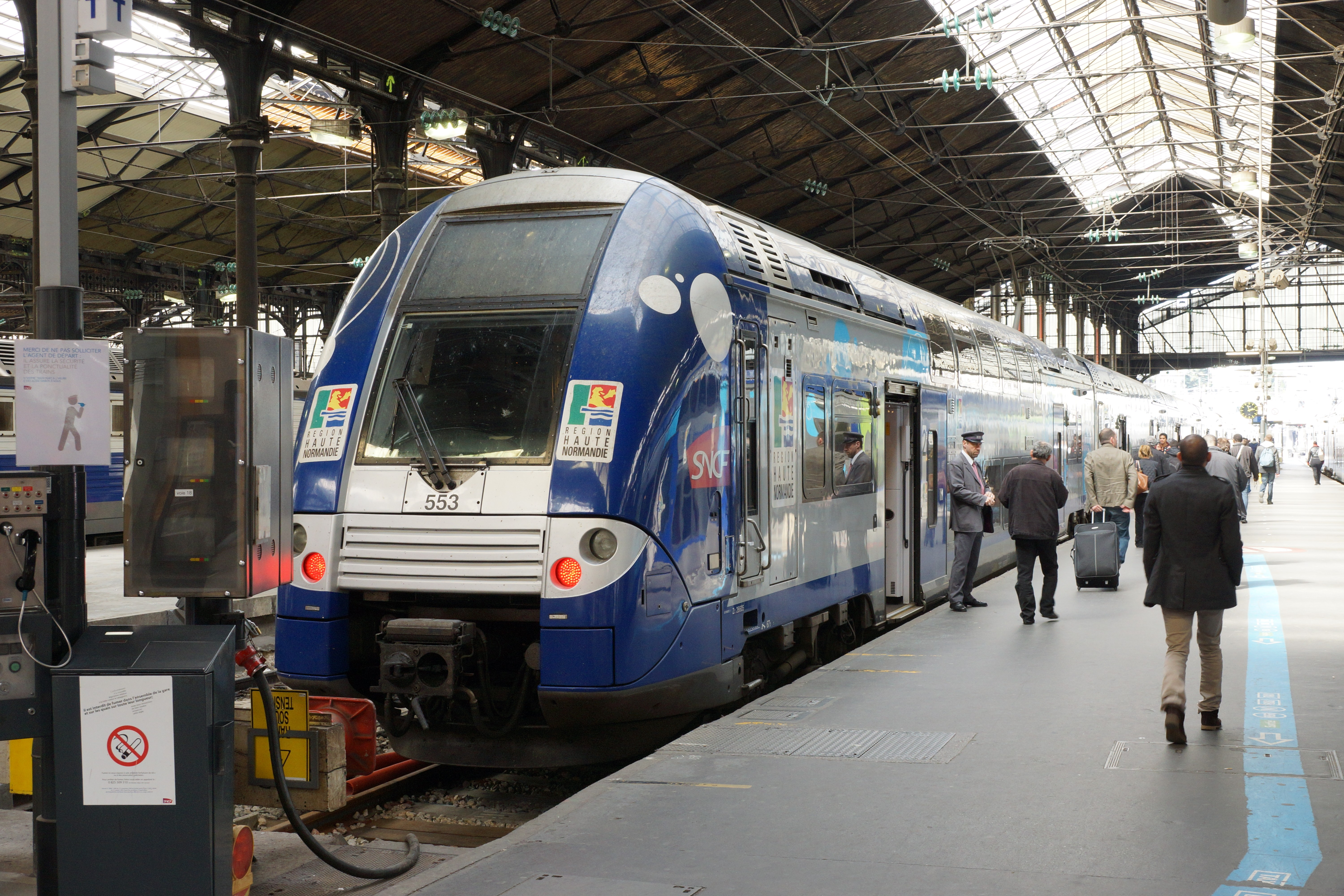
Intercity train at Saint Lazare

The following regional train services operate out of Saint-Lazare:

- Paris – Vernon – Rouen – Le Havre
- Paris – Évreux – Lisieux – Caen – Cherbourg
- Paris – Évreux – Lisieux – Trouville-Deauville

=== Suburban (Transilien) ===
The following Transilien lines depart from Saint-Lazare:

- J
  - Saint-Lazare – Conflans – Gisors
  - Saint-Lazare – Ermont-Eaubonne
  - Saint-Lazare – Conflans – Mantes-la-Jolie
  - Saint-Lazare – Poissy – Mantes-la-Jolie – Vernon
- L
  - Saint-Lazare – Cergy-le-Haut
  - Saint-Lazare – Saint-Nom-la-Bretèche
  - Saint-Lazare – Versailles-Rive-Droite

== See also ==
- List of Paris railway stations
- List of RER stations
- List of Paris Métro stations
