= Le Val d'Or station =

Railway station in Saint-Cloud, France

Le Val d'Or
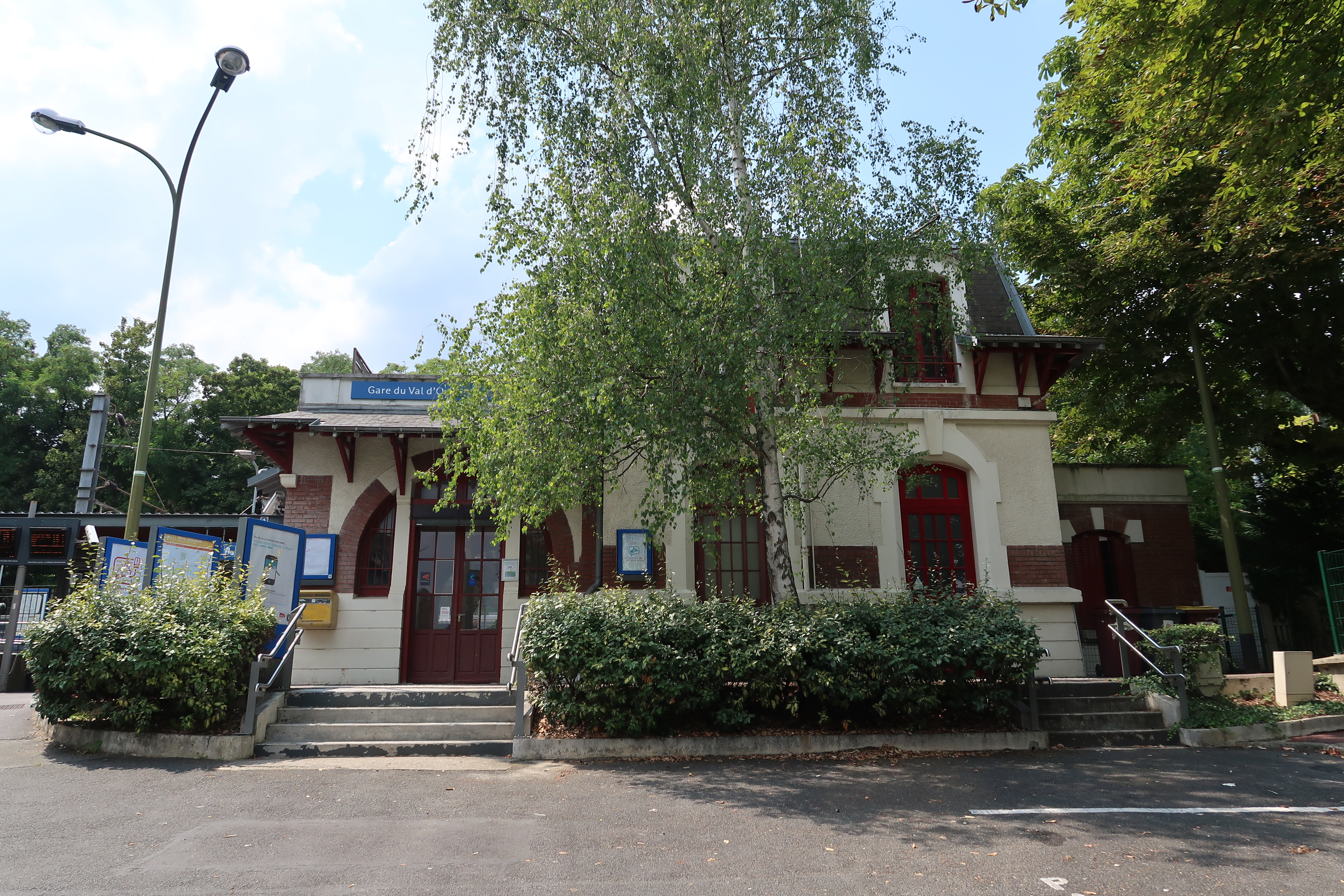
- Station building in 2018

General information
- Location: 33 Avenue Alfred-Belmontet; 92210 Saint-Cloud; France
- Coordinates: 48°51′25″N 2°13′00″E
- System: Transilien commuter rail station
- Owner: SNCF
- Operator: SNCF
- Line: Transilien Transilien Line L (Paris-Saint-Lazare)
- Platforms: 2 (1 central)
- Tracks: 3
- Connections: Bus

Other information
- Station code: 87382366
- Fare zone: 3

Passengers
- 2024: 1,983,495

Services
Preceding station	Transilien	Following station
Saint-Cloud towards Saint-Nom-la-Bretèche or Versailles–Rive Droite	Line L	Suresnes–Mont-Valérien towards Paris–Saint Lazare
Location

Le Val d'Or (French pronunciation: [val dɔʁ]; lit. 'The Vale of Gold'; French: Gare du Val d'Or) is a railway station on the line from Paris-Saint-Lazare to Versailles-Rive-Droite, in the commune of Saint-Cloud in the Hauts-de-Seine department, Île-de-France region, France.

In 1903 the Compagnie des chemins de fer de l'Ouest launched a halt to serve the Fouilleuse Racecourse (now the Saint-Cloud Racecourse). The halt took on its current name and configuration in 1911 when it became a station. From 1918 to 1952, it served companies in neighbouring Suresnes and Rueil-Malmaison, including a military arsenal. In the early 2000s, it was completely renovated, with a new footbridge and facilities that make it a model of accessibility for disabled passengers.

It is a Société nationale des chemins de fer français (SNCF) station, served by Transilien Line L. It is 12.8 km (7.9 mi) from Paris-Saint-Lazare station.

== Location ==
At an altitude of 78 m, Le Val d'Or station is located at kilometre point (PK) 12.769 on the Paris-Saint-Lazare to Versailles-Rive-Droite line, between Suresnes–Mont-Valérien and Saint-Cloud stations.

== Toponymy ==
Val d'Or was, at the time of the station's creation in 1903, the name of the path running from the Saint-Cloud racecourse to the boat station on the Seine, after crossing the tracks of the Paris-Saint-Lazare to Versailles line and the Moulineaux line. In 2013, it was included in the name of the "Hippodrome/Fouilleuse/Val d'Or" district, where the station is located.

The micro toponym Val d'Or is attested in various forms: Vaudor in 1606, Vaulx d'or in July 1607, Vaux d'or in November 1607 and Veau d'or in August 1811. It recalls the location of a "rich and fertile valley" between Saint-Cloud and Suresnes.

== History ==
=== 1903: Saint-Cloud racetrack stopover ===
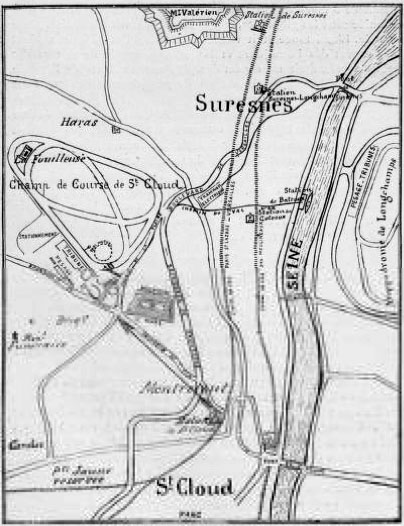
Site plan of the racecourse in 1901.

The line from Asnières to Versailles (Rive droite), officially opened on 4 August 1839, by the Société anonyme du chemin de Versailles (Rive droite), did not include a stop between the Saint-Cloud station and the Suresnes station opened a year later.

The need for a new stop arose with the creation of the Saint-Cloud racecourse on the Fouilleuse plain. Shortly before its inauguration on 15 March 1901, Le Sport universel illustré reported that several existing or planned means of spectator access were available, including creating a new station, 400 meters from the entrance via the Chemin du Val d'Or. This will be closer than the new station at Les Coteaux, on the Moulineaux line, or the boat dock at Les Coteaux de Saint-Cloud, access to which is blocked by the Paris-Saint-Lazare to Versailles-Rive-Droite line (see map opposite).

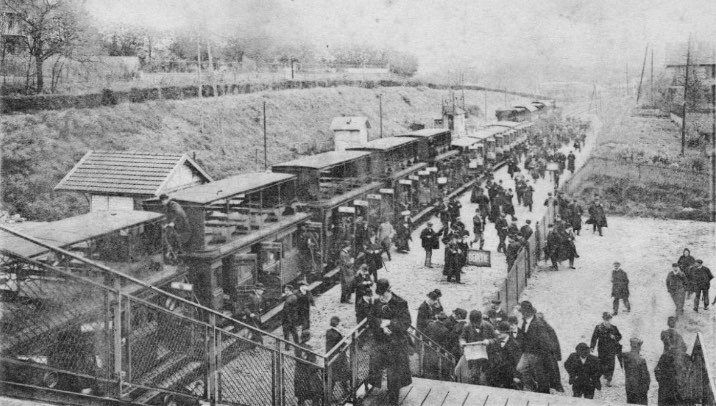
Arrival of a train on racetrack day.

As a result, and to facilitate access to the racecourse, the Société des Coteaux du Bois de Boulogne et de Longchamp requested the construction of a footbridge over the tracks at kilometre point (PK) 12.852. Authorization was obtained in September 1901, for a temporary footbridge two meters wide. The company agreed, at its own expense, to extend it and transform it into a metal footbridge, as soon as it was decided to build a rest area.

On 17 January 1902, the decision to build a stopover was communicated to the directors of the Compagnie des chemins de fer de l'Ouest. Work began in May at a point roughly equidistant between the Suresnes and Saint-Cloud stations. In 1903, the "Saint-Cloud racetrack" station went into service. It has two platforms, with a special track serving the up platform, established between the stop and Saint-Cloud. Its construction led to the widening to thirteen meters of the opening of the bridge on rue du Calvaire, known as the "Pont des Trois Pierrots". A four-meter-wide footbridge completed the project. When it opened, trains on the Paris to Versailles line served it only on race days at the Plaine de Fouilleuse racecourse.

=== 1911: Val d'Or station ===
The decree of 29 December 1909, authorized the commune of Saint-Cloud to borrow 40,000 Fr to pay a subsidy of 80,000 Fr, together with other resources, for work to transform the station into a rest area. The decree also authorized the Administration des chemins de fer de l'État to levy local surcharges on passengers using the new station (5 centimes per one-way ticket and 10 centimes per return ticket) for a maximum period of ten years.

In 1911, the State set up sidings at various stations on the line, notably at the Saint-Cloud racecourse stop known as "Val d'Or", for freight trains that were impeding passenger traffic. In the same year, the State carried out work to transform the former stopover into a passenger station, renaming it Le Val d'Or station. The passenger building was erected at the same time. On 7 October 1911, the Saint-Cloud town council expressed the wish that the station be renamed "Saint-Cloud – Val-d'Or", but this request was not acted upon.

The station before 1914

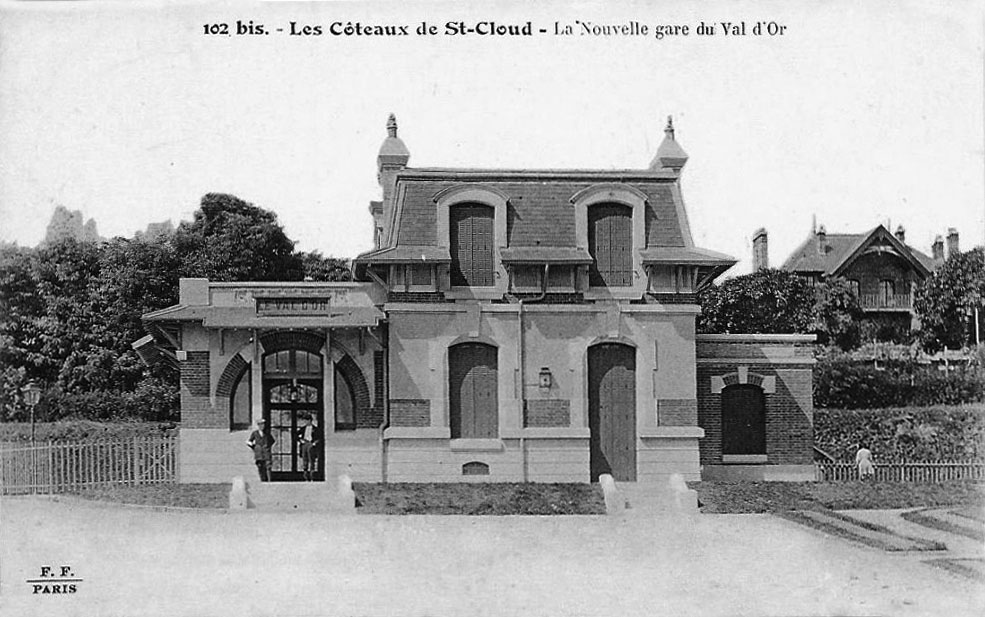
The passenger building.

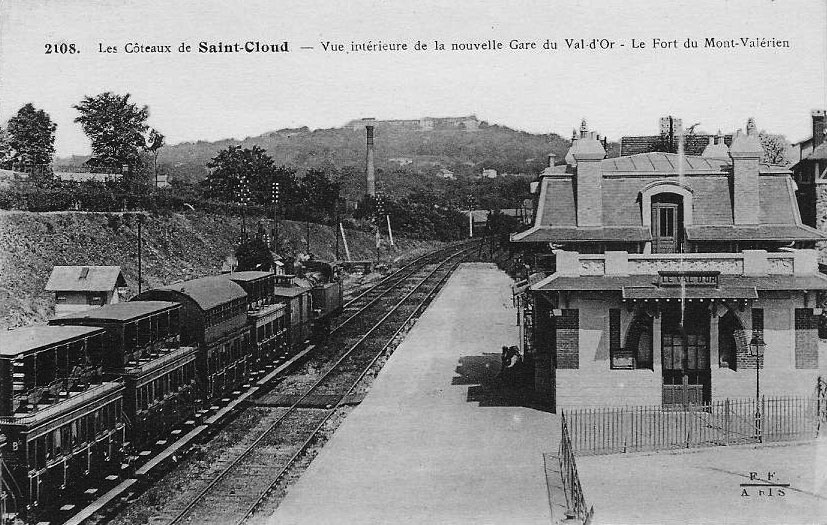
A train stopped in front of the passenger building.

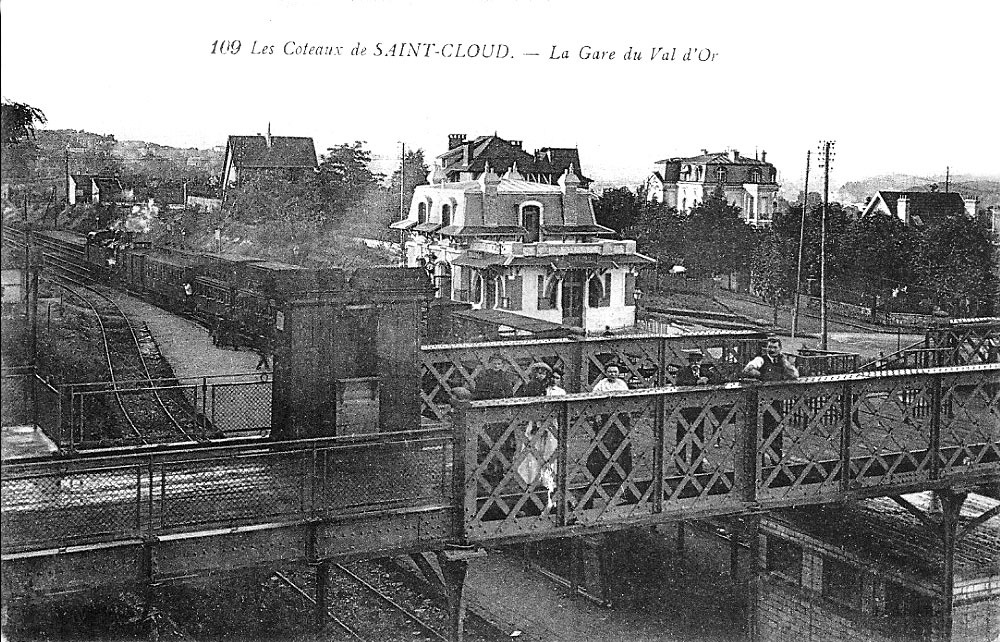
A general view of the station.

=== 1918–1952: station and dock spur ===
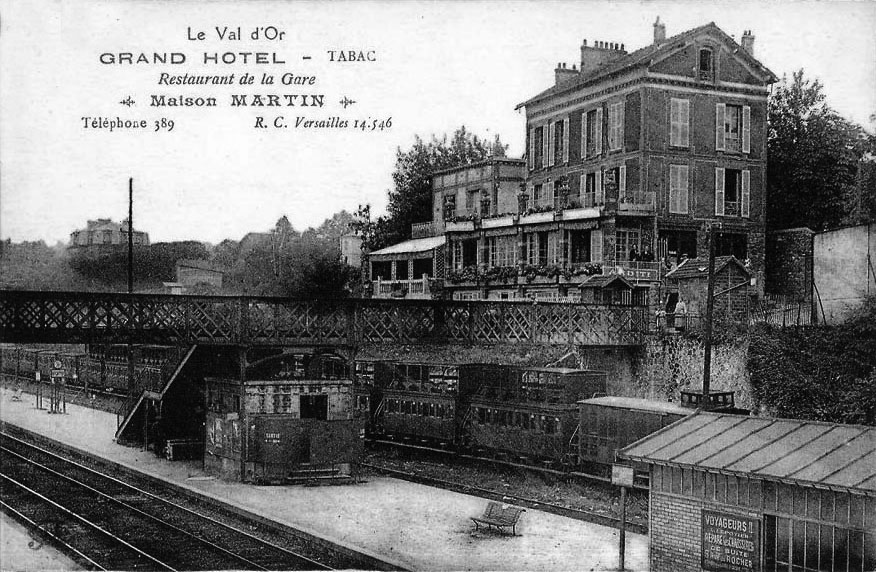
The station circa 1920, on the right: the sidings for the branch line.

In 1917, the Atelier de Construction de Puteaux, an arsenal lacking available space on its original site, decided to relocate part of its production to Rueil, and to connect the new workshop "to the Val d'Or railroad line".

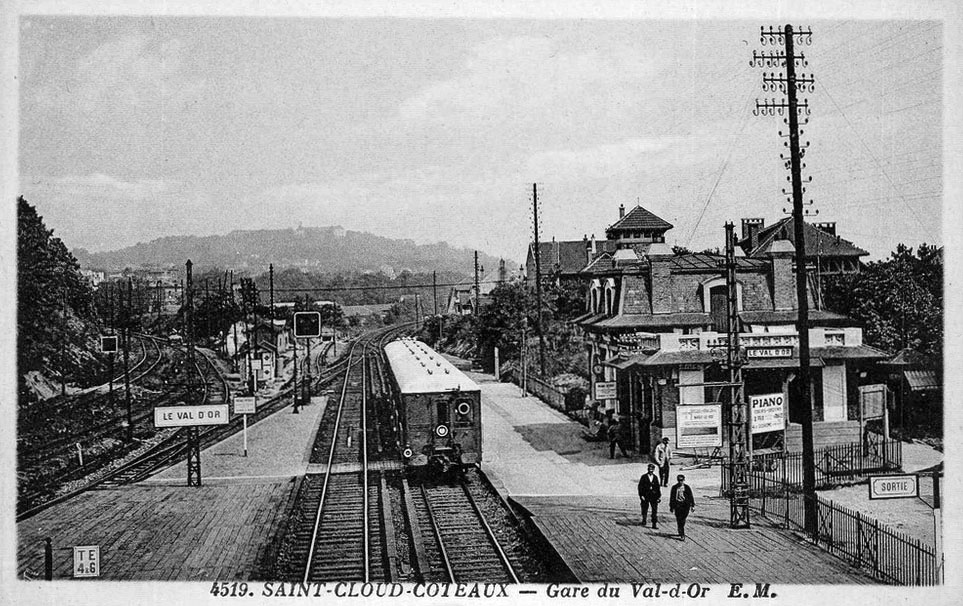
The station and branch line circa 1930.

At the end of the First World War, the station's facilities were modified when a special branch line was set up to serve "the docks and sand chambers to be built on the Fouilleuse plain [...] by the artillery department of the Puteaux arsenal". The docks line is a single-track branch line 2,500 meters long, crossing the territory of the three communes of Saint-Cloud, Suresnes, and Rueil-Malmaison. It branches off from the Versailles line north of the Val d'Or station, and heads north-west on a steep gradient for the first 250 meters, where a four-meter difference in level has to be overcome. At Val d'Or station, sidings are set up, connected to the special upward track.

In 1918, along the Boulevard de Versailles, the branch line was connected to the Chemin de fer du Bois de Boulogne (CFBB), Porte Maillot – Val d'Or – Saint-Cloud, which in 1921 became tramway line 44 of the Société des transports en commun de la région parisienne (STCRP). This junction enabled two daily runs between Porte Maillot and Rueil-Malmaison for staff. The section was electrified from the boulevard de Versailles to the Rueil factory.

In the early 1920s, the modest facilities at Rueil became the Rueil factory – or arsenal – part of the Atelier de Construction de Puteaux (APX), located along Boulevard National in Puteaux. In 1926–1927, the mayors of Rueil-Malmaison and Suresnes entered into discussions with the STCRP and the military authorities to introduce passenger traffic on the branch line. However, the project was abandoned: line 44 was withdrawn on 28 December 1936, during the great wave of tramway withdrawals in France, and replaced by a bus line bearing the same name. As early as 1927, the very poor condition of the spruce sleepers prompted the arsenal to consider transferring goods to the road.

Between 20 March and 17 April 1932, a detachment consisting of an officer, a warrant officer, three non-commissioned officers, and sixty corporals and sappers modified 650 meters of the "military track connecting the Puteaux arsenal to the Val d'Or station".

On 19 October 1945, at 12:45 pm, a serious accident occurred on the junction at the Croix du Roy crossroads, when a train carrying two thirty-tonne tanks to the arsenal collided with a bus from line 44: several people were killed and around fifteen injured. In 1953, a local street was named after Dr. Bombiger, in recognition of his dedication to helping the injured in this accident.

The operation of the branch line was the subject of an agreement with the French State Railways Administration, then the SNCF, which supplied the traction equipment; the last agreement was signed in July 1950. When the Rueil plant's activities were reoriented, with a sharp reduction in the transport of heavy equipment, the branch line was finally abandoned in 1959. That year, the SNCF received Fr. 445,000 for traction and Fr. 70,000 for weeding the branch line.

At the end of the 1960s, the army gradually handed over the Rueil factory site to Régie Renault. Today, part of the branch line site is occupied by the parking lot of the Parc du Val d'Or residence (the tall "S"-shaped building, in white in the photo opposite). Some traces of the railroad line are still visible on aerial views.

=== Service evolution from 1928 to 2004 ===
The station, served by electric commuter trains since the installation of a third power rail in 1928, was adapted for the installation of the new catenary power supply commissioned in 1976. It became a station on the tangential line, with the installation of a permanent counter-current facility (IPCS) between the station and the Suresnes-Mont-Valérien station in 1995. The line and the station were integrated into the new Transilien network in 1999 and then, in 2004, into the U line, the tangential line's new name (La Défense – La Verrière).

=== 2008–2013: renovation and accessibility ===
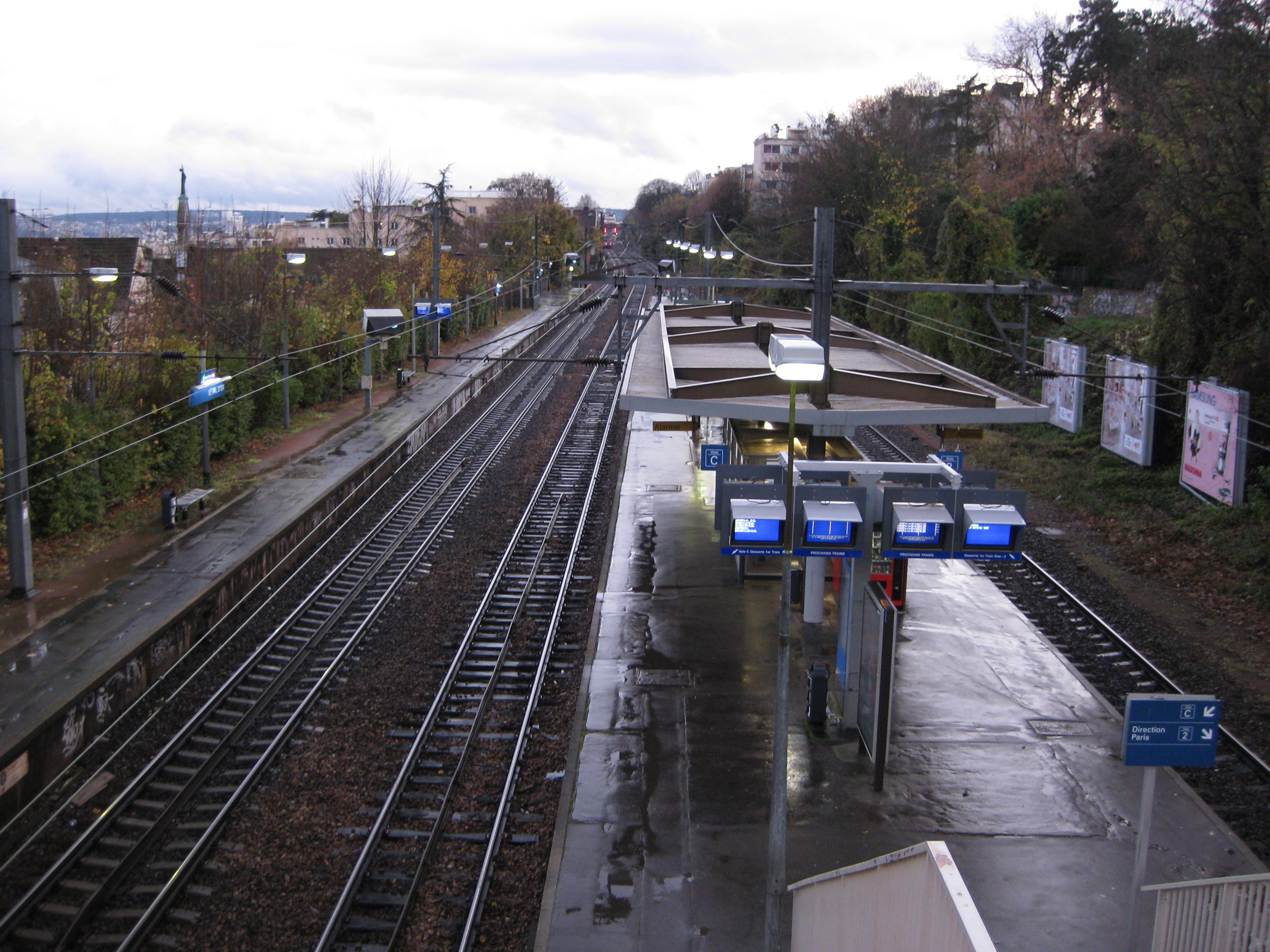
Central Pier in 2008.

In the early 2000s, the old footbridge, which overlooks the station and provides access to the platforms as well as a link between the upper and lower towns of Saint-Cloud, was tired after more than a century of use. Consideration was given to replacing it, taking into account the need for disabled access and the constraints imposed by its cramped site, its various functions and its aesthetic appeal, since it is located in the protected natural area of Mont Valérien. This project is being fine-tuned by its promoters, the SNCF, as part of its "Mobigare" reference system, and the Île-de-France region, with its "deployment of accessibility projects" program, in consultation with the town of Saint-Cloud and associations.

The focal point of this major project is the construction of a new public footbridge overhanging the railway line, with the commune's pathways between the top and bottom of the hillside. Its links with the railway site, in particular platforms A and B, comprise four elevators, two escalators, and four fixed staircases. The platforms and the old passenger building are also included in the project, with major renovations.

To make the site as accessible as possible, the work will involve replacing the furniture, removing any obstacles to movement, modifying the flooring, installing signage adapted to different types of disability, and upgrading the lighting. For ticket control, a wider walkway has been installed, and a new "Transilien fast machine" has been installed. All in all, the improvements cover all types of disability, whether physical or sensory.

In March 2011, before the project was completed, the Val d'Or station site was one of thirteen winners of the "competition to collect best practices and good practices in terms of accessibility".

Worksite in March 2011

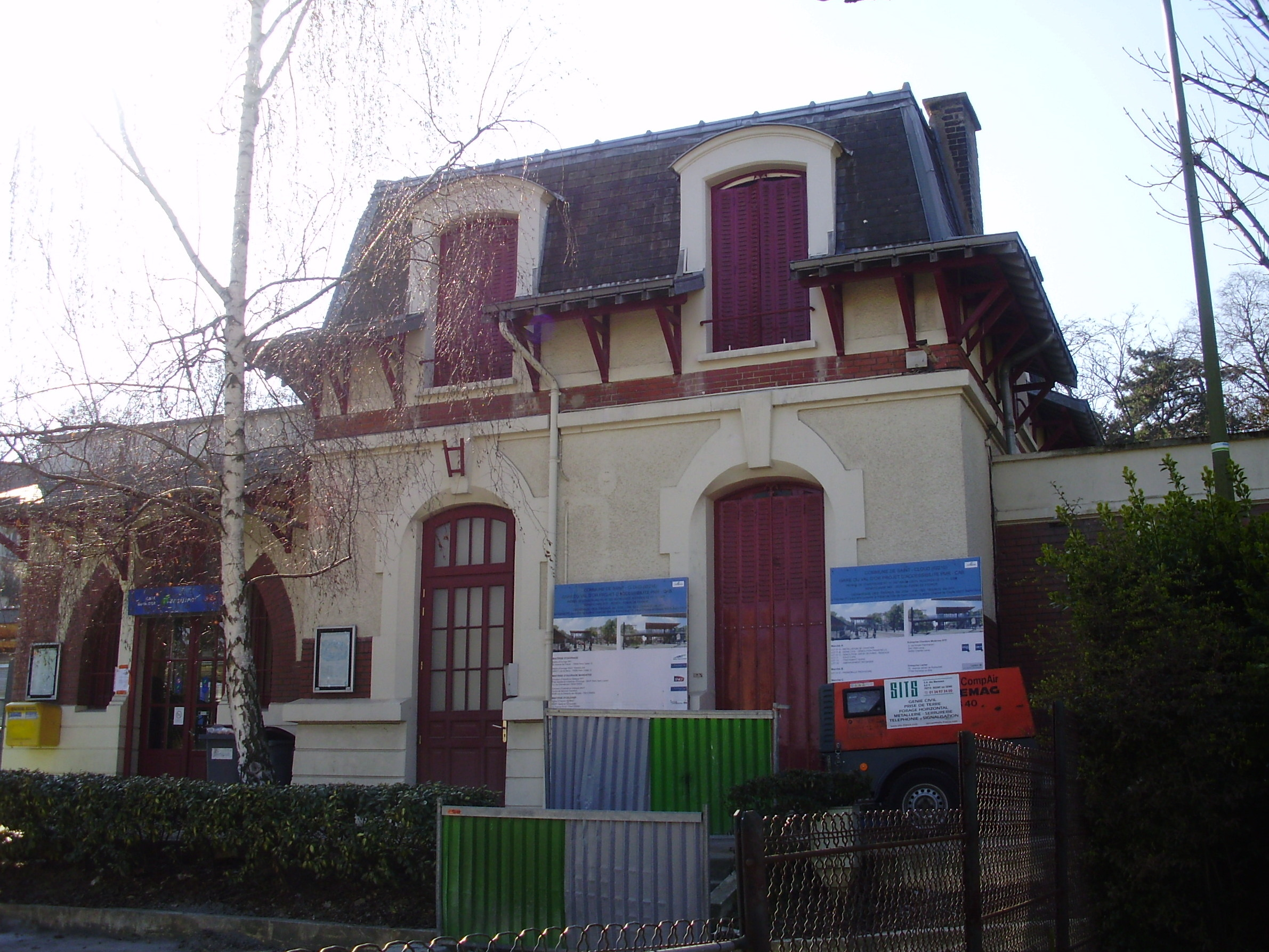
Passenger building.

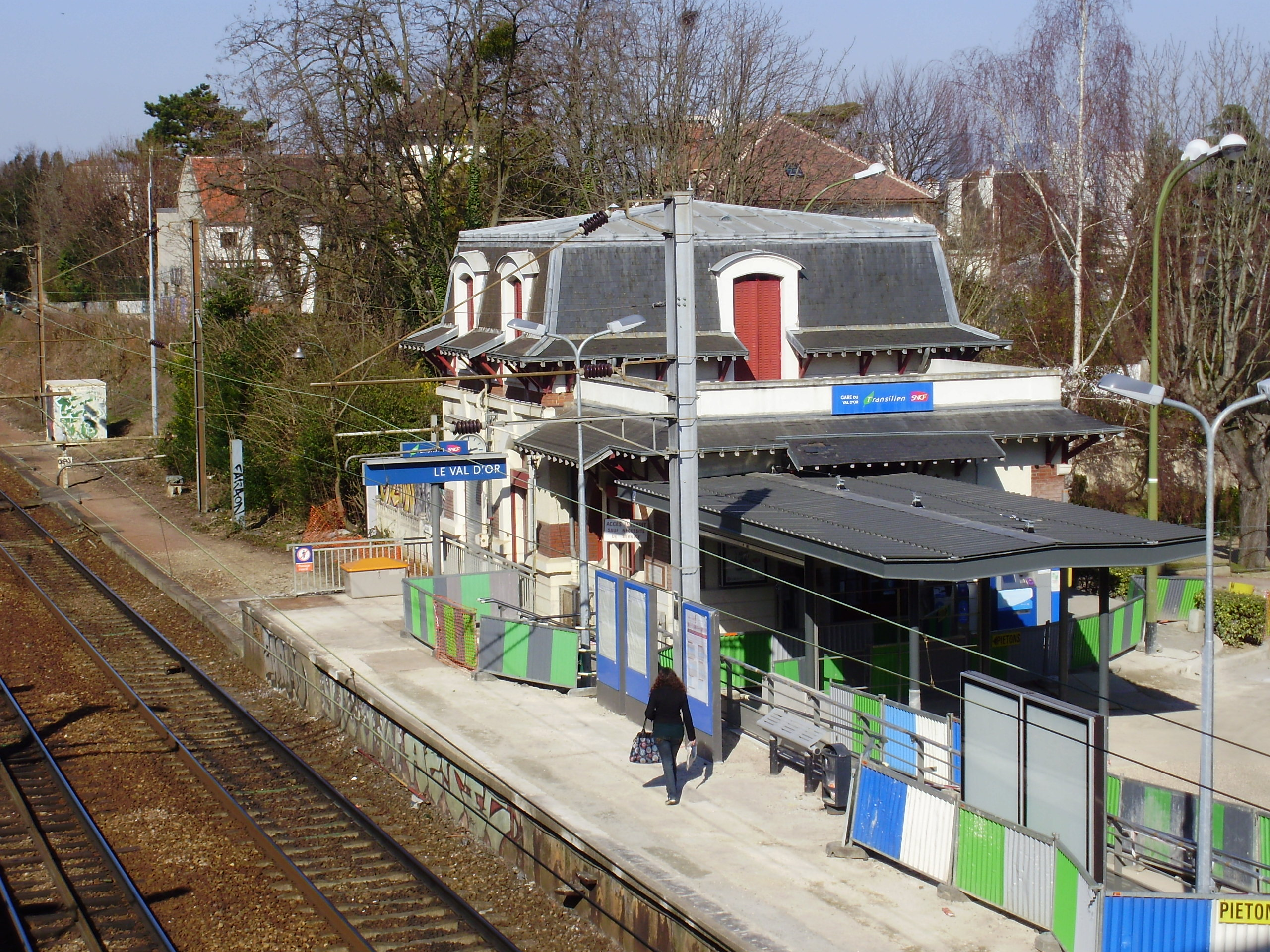
View from the footbridge.

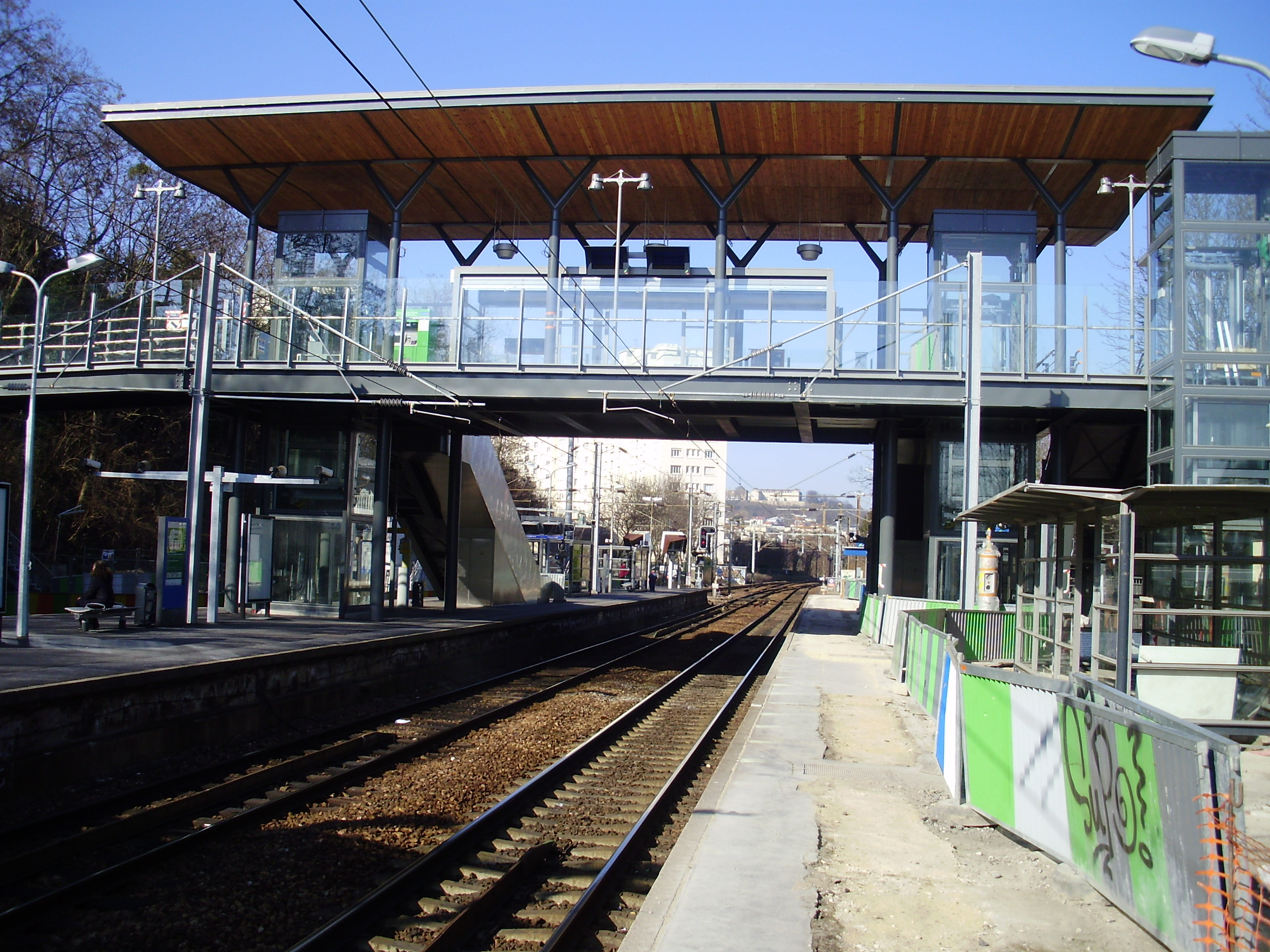
New footbridge.

The tracks are also being renovated. In January 2013, the SNCF set up a lightning strike involving some 200 workers. In just forty-eight hours, they replaced three switches and 850 m of track, including new ballast.

=== 2015–2016: service changes ===
==== End of Line U service ====
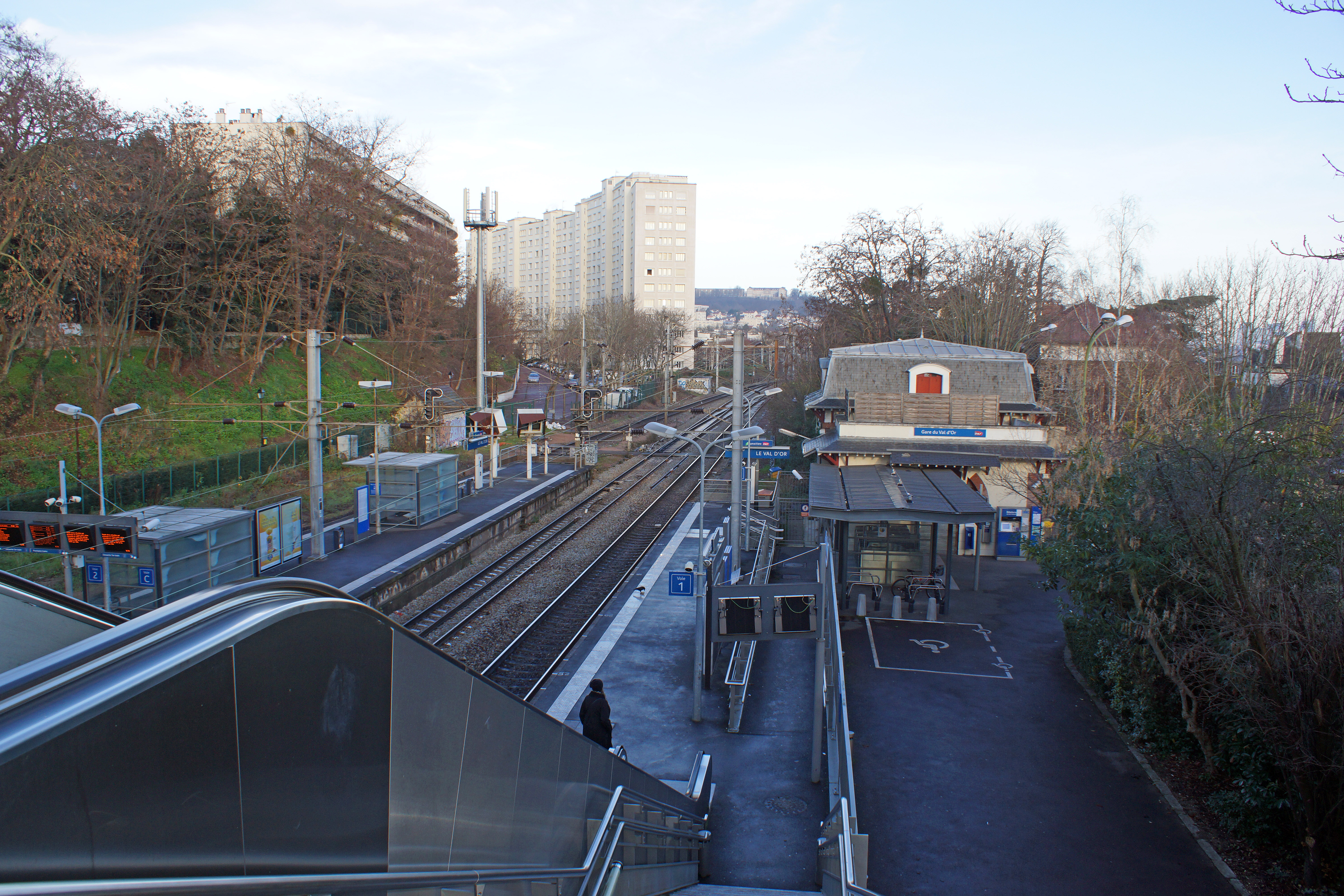
View from the bridge in 2015.

In 2013, users of line L, fed up with recurrent delays and trains that passed without stopping, set up the "Plus de trains pour la Défense" association. After winning over other users, the association organized itself with at least one representative for each station on the line. They take an interest in the entire line and its timetables. This enables them to open up a real dialogue with the SNCF. Two line committees have been set up, and have succeeded in moving the issue forward by making emergency proposals such as canceling a train, whether direct or not so that subsequent trains can stop at all stations without worrying about delays. The SNCF's executives are being shaken up; one of them admits: "For a long time, we were willing to sacrifice 1,000 passengers so that the next 50,000 would be right on time. We've changed".

As of the implementation of the 2016 annual service on 13 December 2015, the station is no longer served by Transilien Line U trains, which had all stopped there since the line's creation on 28 May 1995. This discontinuation of service to the station, as well as the change in the overall service offering, was justified because "the quality of service on line L Sud has deteriorated [...] does not meet emerging and future needs, mainly towards La Défense [...] has several intrinsic weaknesses".

==== Continued service on line L ====
On the same 13 December 2015, a new timetable altered the frequency of train service on Transilien Line L, when the 2016 annual service came into effect. The station's "500 users" "see themselves as sacrificed" when choices were made to improve traffic flow on lines L and U. Nevertheless, the most penalized in terms of travel time are those who are not heading for Paris but for other suburban towns, such as Suresnes for Dassault Aviation employees.

On 14 January 2016, there were fewer people on the trains, allowing them to board instead of waiting for the next one, and that there were also fewer train cancellations. Passengers are now waiting for the promises of major investment in rolling stock renewal and infrastructure improvements to be fulfilled.

== Station ridership ==
Daily upward traffic reached 1,153 passengers in 1938, 2,950 in 1973, and finally dropped to 2,200 passengers per day in 2003, following the introduction of tramway line 2 in 1997.

== Passenger services ==
=== Reception ===
A Transilien station, it has a passenger building open every day, equipped with automatic ticket machines for purchasing Transilien and mainline tickets. There are also vending machines for drinks, snacks, and newspapers. A footbridge, equipped with elevators and escalators, is accessible from rue du Pierrier and avenue Alfred-Belmontet and provides access across the tracks and to the platforms.

Near the footbridge, on the rue du Pierrier side, a Lions club – a service club – financed the installation of a "book box", which was inaugurated on 30 May 2018. These boxes, deployed in several French towns or stations, are designed to enable the circulation of books, similar to BookCrossing.

The footbridge in December 2015

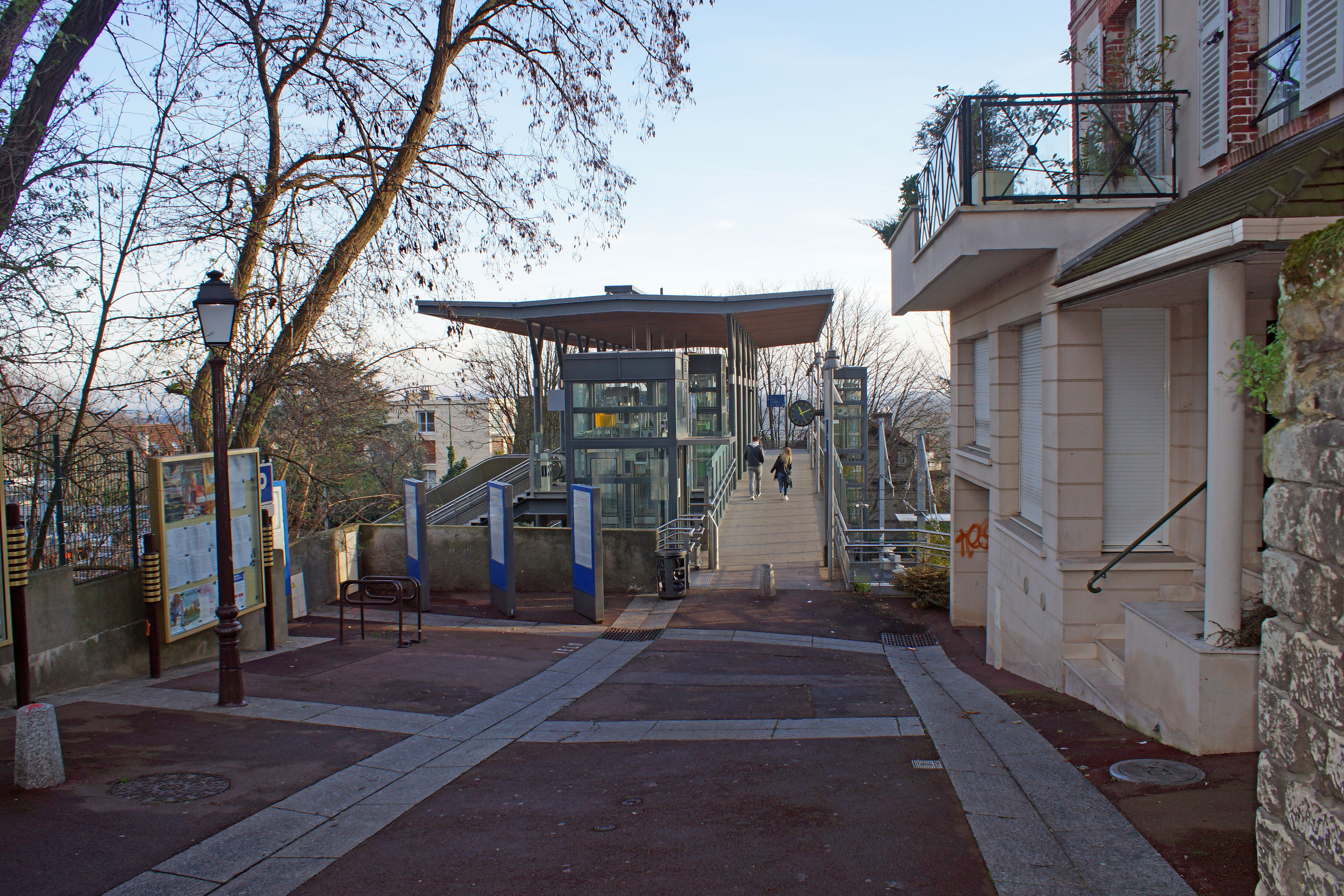
Access to the footbridge.

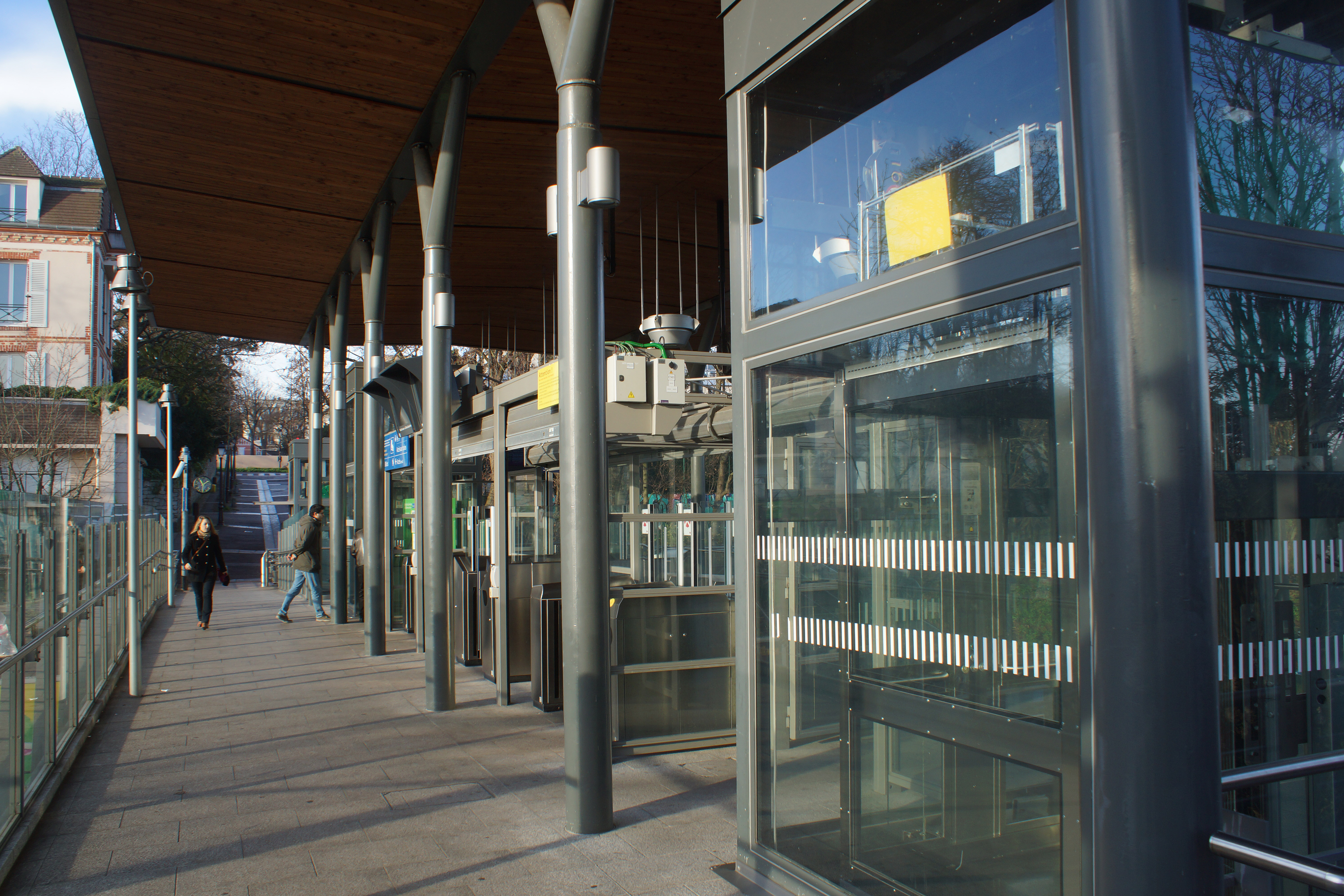
Footbridge and elevators.

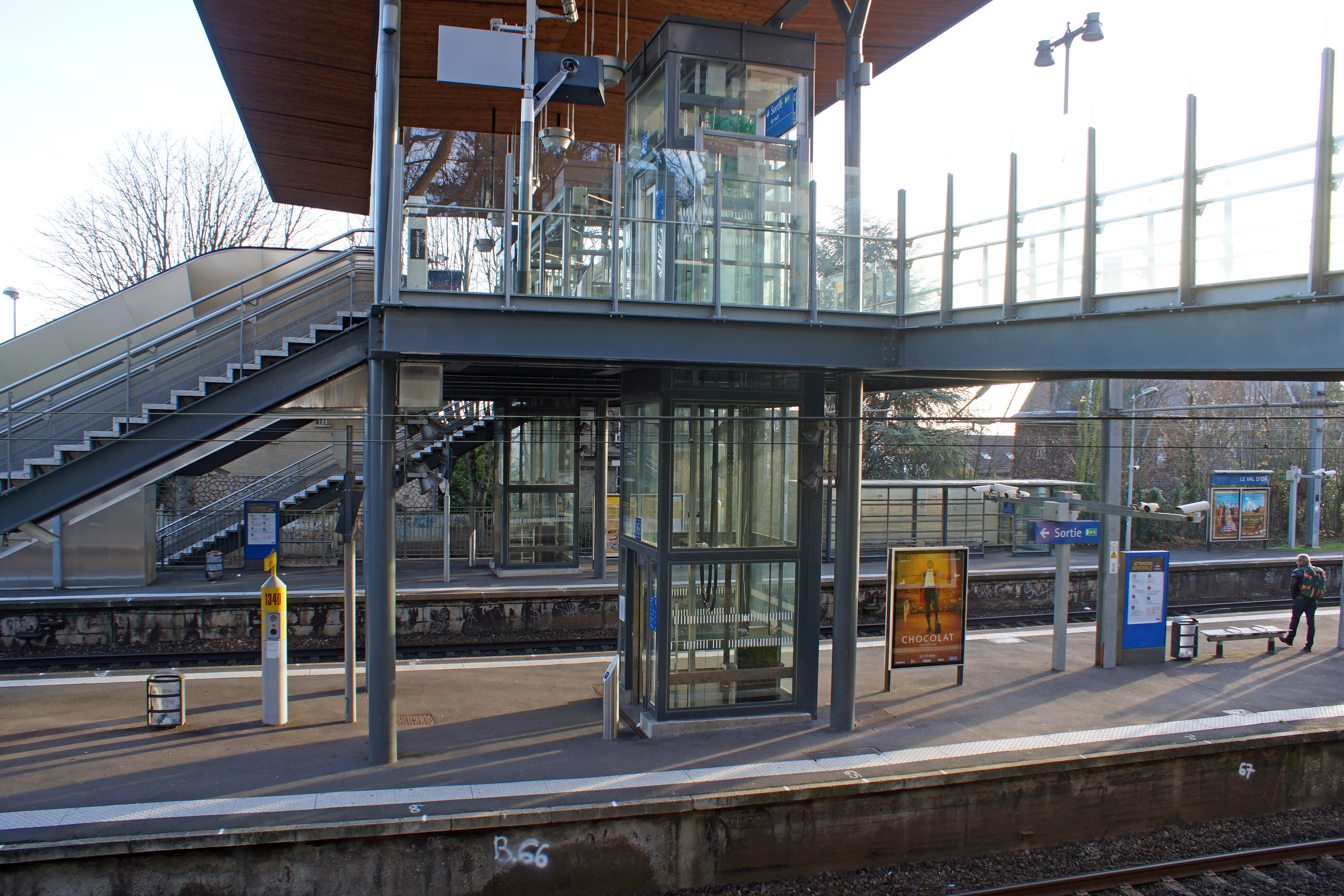
Platforms and elevators.

=== Service ===
The station is served by Transilien Paris Saint-Lazare "regional" L line trains to and from Saint-Nom-la-Bretêche (except in the early morning and late evening, when service is also provided by trains to and from Versailles-Rive-Droite), with a train every 10 minutes during rush hour and every 15 minutes during off-peak hours and in the evening.

Travel time from Paris-Saint-Lazare is 18 min, except for the first train of the day and the late evening trains from 9:41 p.m. when it is 21 min. For information, according to Google Maps estimates, the same journey by car takes 25 to 30 min, depending on the route taken.

Service in February 2019

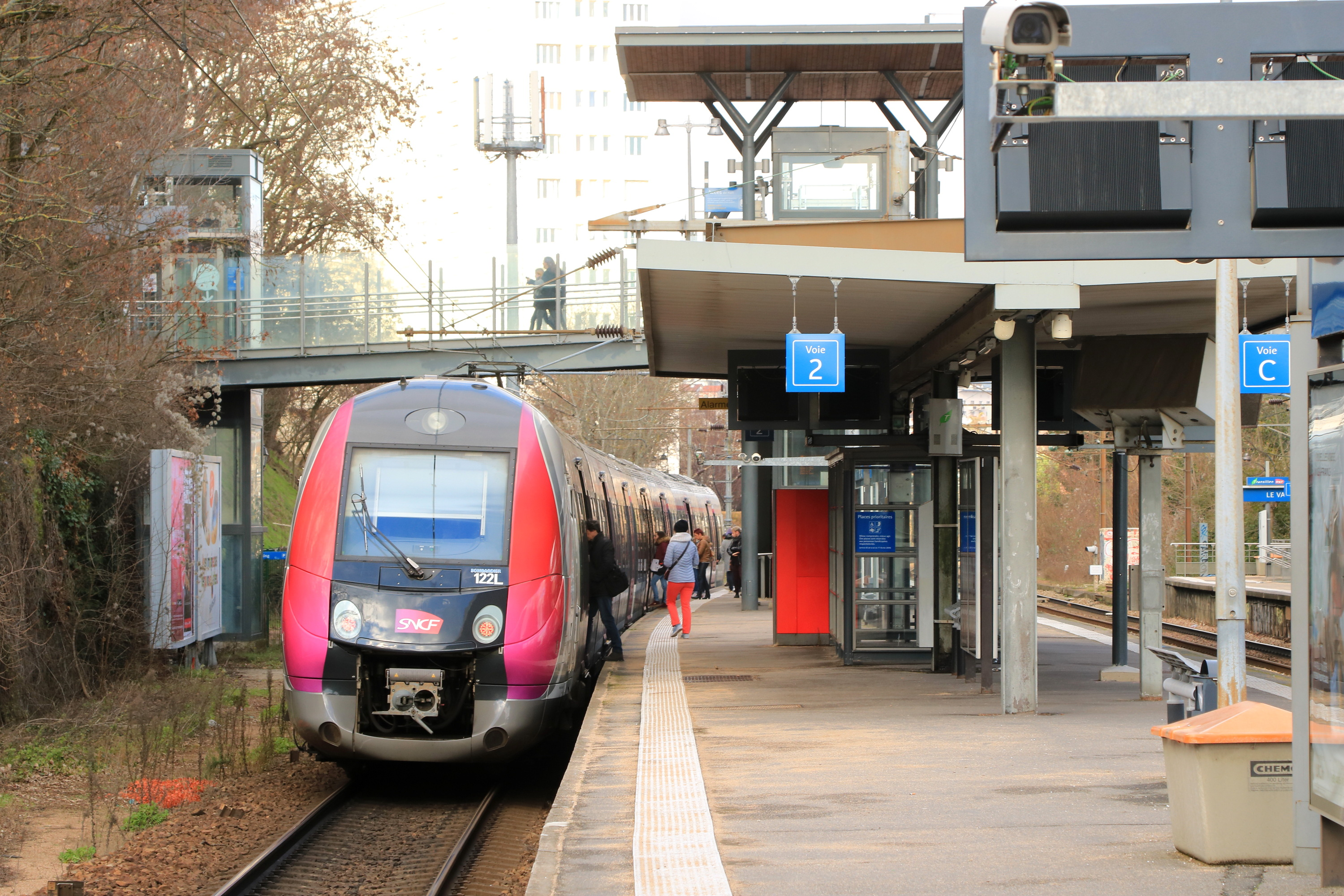
Z 50000 no 122L train to Paris-Saint-Lazare.

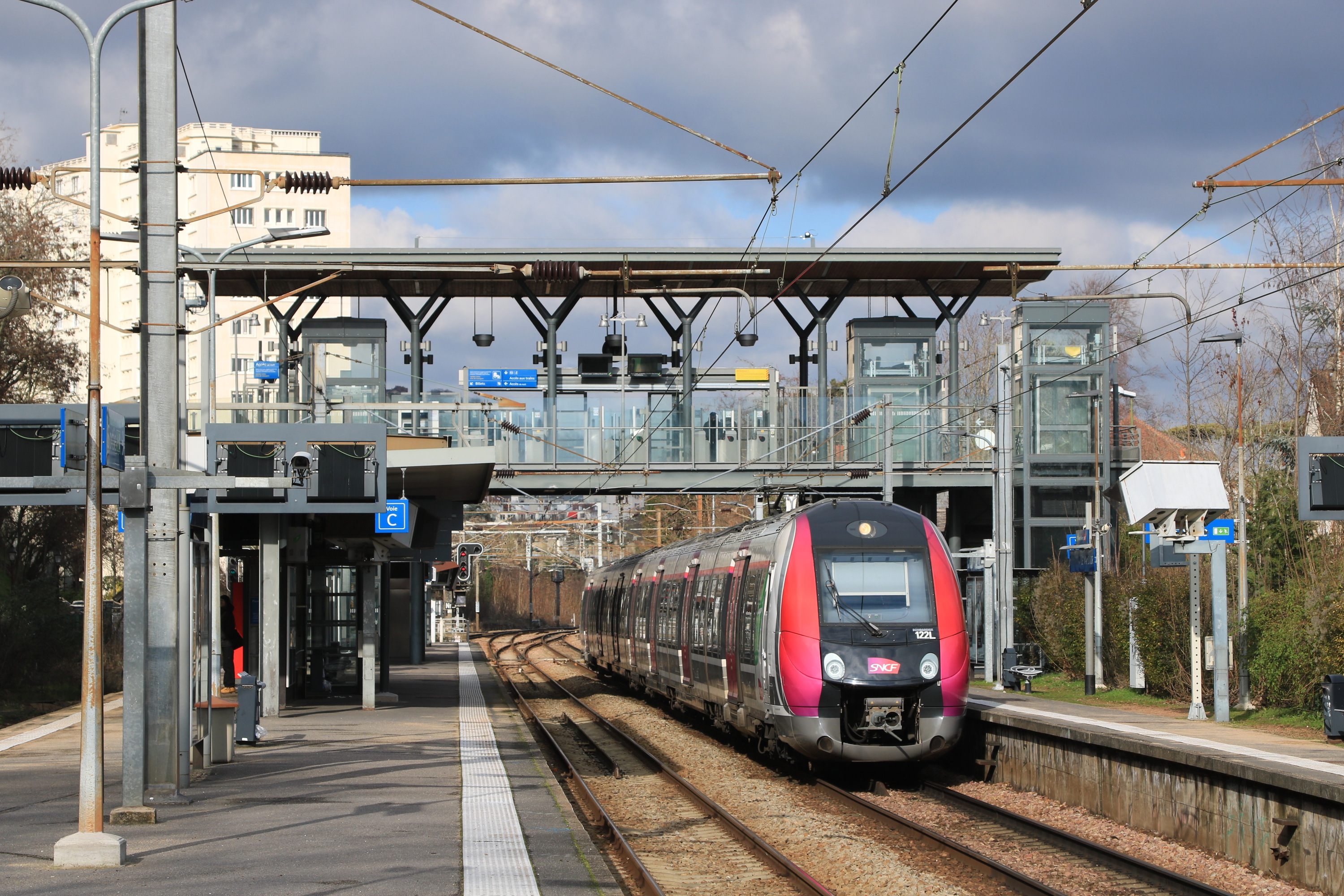
Train Z 50000 no 122L towards Saint-Cloud.

=== Intermodality ===
Passengers have access to a bicycle park and a paid parking lot with a capacity of 100 to 200 spaces. According to the Transilien L line diagram, a connection via the public highway (via avenue de Longchamp) is possible with the Les Coteaux station on the T2 tramway line.

The station is served by lines 144, 160, 244, 360, and 471 of the RATP bus network, by line 40 of the Argenteuil – Boucles de Seine bus network, and, at night, by line N53 of the Noctilien network.

== See also ==
- List of SNCF stations
- List of Transilien stations
- Chemins de fer de l'Ouest
- Saint-Cloud Racecourse

== Bibliography ==
- Baillère, Henri (1900). Autour d'une source: la fontaine des Vaux-d'Or, la sente de Saint-Cloud à Suresnes, la tourelle de la porte de Saint-Cloud (in French). J.-B. Baillière et fils.
- Bouchez, Pierre (2007). De Paris Saint-Lazare à Versailles et Saint-Nom la Bretèche : 1839–2007 (in French). Les Éditions La Vie du rail. ISBN 978-2-9150-3467-7.
- Caron, François (2005). Les Grandes Compagnies de chemin de fer en France 1823-1937. Publications d'histoire économique et sociale internationale; archives économiques du Crédit lyonnais (in French). Droz. ISBN 2-600-00942-6.
- Collardey, Bernard (1999). Les Trains de banlieue, vol. 2 : De 1938 à 1999 (in French). La Vie du rail et des transports. ISBN 2-9028-0876-3.
- Douté, Reinhard (2011). Profils de lignes du réseau ferré français (in French). Les Éditions La Vie du rail. ISBN 978-2-9187-5844-0.
- Palau, François; Palau, Maguy (2003). Le Rail en France : les 80 premières lignes 1828-1851 (in French). F. et M. Palau. ISBN 2-9509-4210-5.
