= Sèvres–Ville-d'Avray station =

Railway station in Sèvres, France

Sèvres Ville-d'Avray
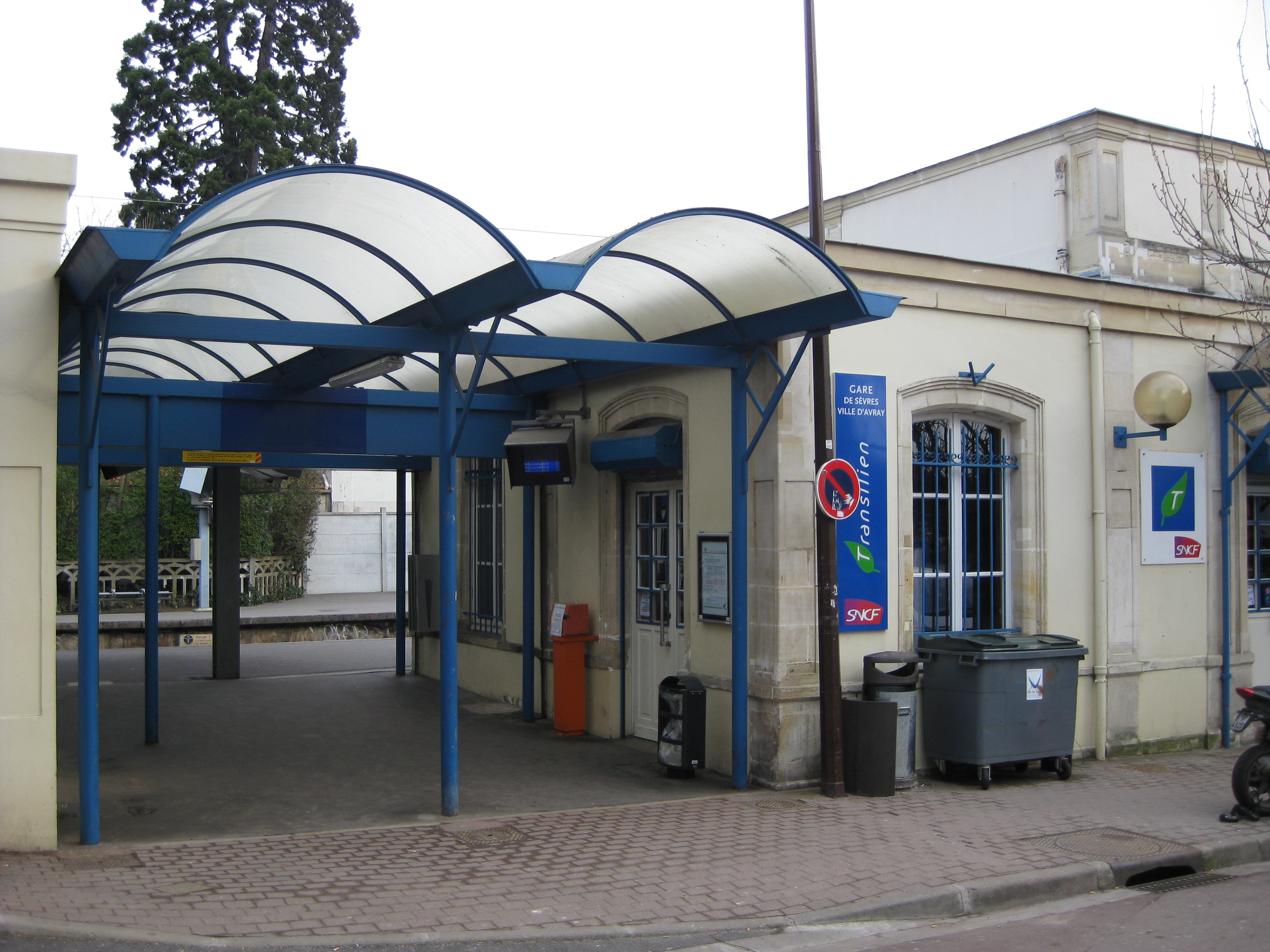

General information
- Coordinates: 48°49′40″N 2°12′5″E
- System: Transilien commuter rail station
- Owner: SNCF
- Line: Transilien Transilien Line L (Paris-Saint-Lazare)
- Platforms: 2
- Tracks: 2
- Connections: bus

Other information
- Station code: 87382341
- Fare zone: 3

Passengers
- 2024: 3,004,507

Services
| Preceding station | Transilien | Following station |
|---|---|---|
| Chaville-Rive-Droite towards Versailles-Rive Droite | Line L | Saint-Cloud towards Paris–Saint Lazare |
| Chaville-Rive-Droite towards La Verrière | Line U | Saint-Cloud towards La Défense |
Location

Sèvres–Ville-d'Avray is a railway station in the commune of Sèvres (department of Hauts-de-Seine). It is in the Île-de-France region of France and is part of the Transilien rail network.

== The station ==
The station is on line L trains of the Transilien Paris-Saint-Lazare network, as well as line U providing service between La Défense and La Verrière. There is a train in each direction every 15 minutes during the day, and every 30 minutes in the evening.
