= Suresnes–Mont-Valérien station =

Railway station in Suresnes, France

Suresnes Mont-Valérien
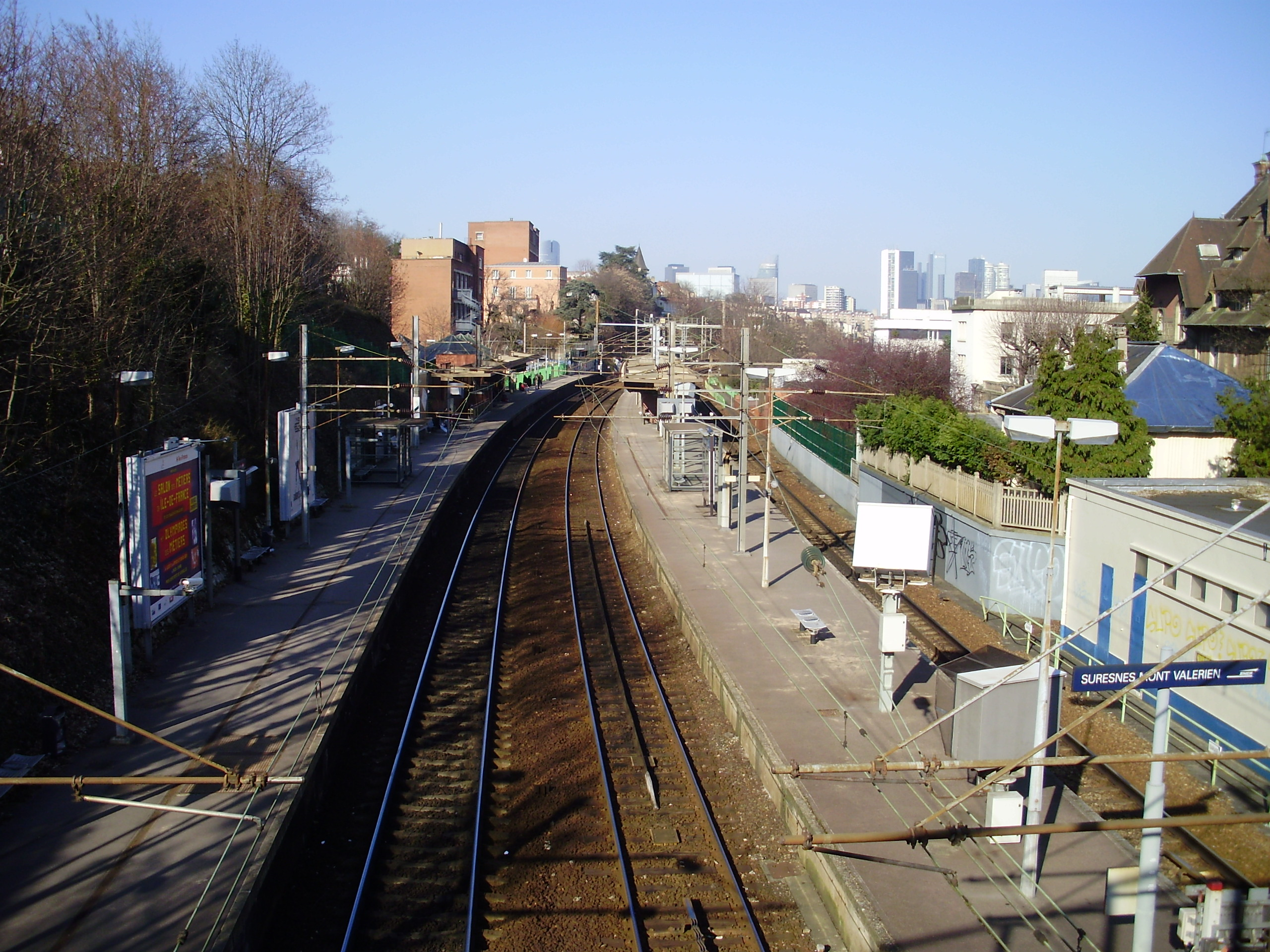

General information
- Location: Suresnes, Hauts-de-Seine, Île-de-France; France
- Coordinates: 48°52′18″N 2°13′16″E
- Line: Line L Line U
- Platforms: 2
- Tracks: 3

Other information
- Station code: 87382374
- Fare zone: 3

History
- Opened: 1840

Passengers
- 2024: 3,743,887

Services
Preceding station	Transilien	Following station
Le Val d'Or towards Saint-Nom-la-Bretèche or Versailles–Rive Droite	Line L	Puteaux towards Paris–Saint Lazare
Saint-Cloud towards La Verrière	Line U	Puteaux towards La Défense
Location

Suresnes–Mont-Valérien is a French railway station on the line from Paris-Saint-Lazare to Versailles-Rive-Droite, located in the territory of the commune of Suresnes, in the Hauts-de-Seine department, in the Île-de-France region. It notably serves the Foch Hospital, located opposite.

The station opened in 1840, is today a station of the Société nationale des chemins de fer français (SNCF) served by the trains of line L of the Transilien (Paris-Saint-Lazare network) as well as those of line U (La Défense - La Verrière). It is located at a distance of 11.0 km from Paris-Saint-Lazare train station.

== Bibliography ==
- René Sordes, Histoire de Suresnes : Des origines à 1945, Société historique de Suresnes, 1965
