= Saint-Cloud station =

Railway station in Greater Paris

Saint-Cloud
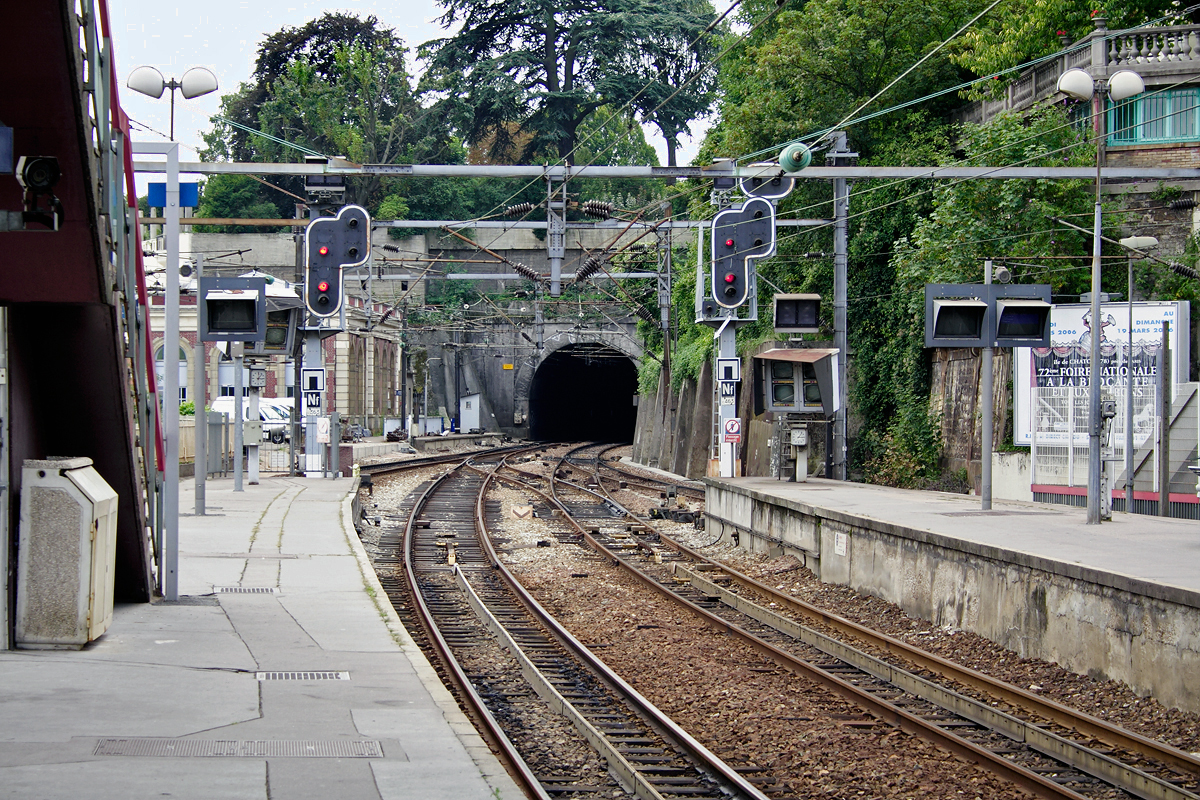

General information
- Location: 42 Rue Dailly; 92210 Saint-Cloud; France
- Coordinates: 48°50′44″N 2°13′02″E
- System: Transilien commuter rail station
- Owner: SNCF
- Operator: SNCF
- Lines: (future)
- Platforms: 2 central
- Tracks: 4 at platform + 3 siding
- Connections: Bus

Other information
- Station code: 87382358
- Fare zone: 3

History
- Opened: 2 August 1839; 187 years ago

Passengers
- 2024: 8,389,550

Services
Preceding station	Transilien	Following station
Sèvres–Ville-d'Avray towards Versailles-Rive Droite	Line L	Le Val d'Or towards Paris–Saint Lazare
Garches–Marnes-la-Coquette towards Saint-Nom-la-Bretèche	Line L	Le Val d'Or towards Paris–Saint Lazare
Sèvres–Ville-d'Avray towards La Verrière	Line U	Suresnes–Mont-Valérien towards La Défense
Location

Saint-Cloud ([sɛ̃ klu]; French: Gare de Saint-Cloud) is a railway station in the commune of Saint-Cloud, Hauts-de-Seine department, Île-de-France, France. It is part of the Transilien rail network. It will also be a station on Line 15 of the Paris Metro which is under construction.

== Situation ==
The station is on the L and U lines of the Transilien Paris–Saint Lazare network. It is at the junction of the Saint-Nom-la-Bretèche and Versailles–Rive Droite branches. Up until 1930, there was a branch about 160 m long providing service to the former Château de Saint-Cloud.
