= SNCF Class BB 1800 =

Class of French motor luggage vans

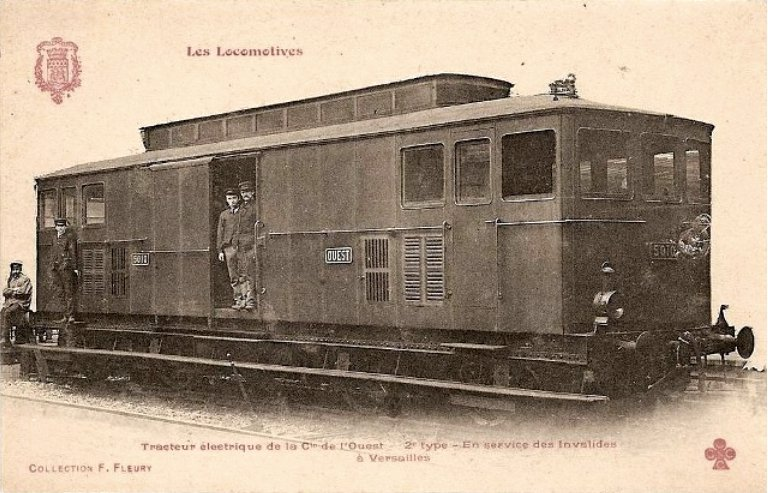
- Z 5010
Type and origin
- Builder: Thomson-Houston - Westinghouse
- Build date: 1900
- Total produced: 10
- Rebuild date: 1932
- Number rebuilt: 9
Specifications
- Configuration
  - AAR: Bo'Bo'
  - Commonwealth: Bo-Bo
- Gauge: 1,435 mm (4 ft 8 1/2 in)
- Wheel diameter: 1,375 mm (54.1 in)
- Wheelbase: 7 m (23 ft)
  - Bogie: 2.6 m (8 ft 6 in)
- Length
  - Over beams: 12.100 m (39.70 ft)
- Width: 2.813 m (9 ft 2.7 in)
- Loco weight: 51 t (50 long tons; 56 short tons)
- Power supply: 600 V DC
- Electric system/s: Third rail
- Current pickup: Contact shoe
- Traction motors: 4 x DK 80
Performance figures
- Maximum speed: 80 km/h (50 mph)
- Power output: 353 kW (473 hp)
Career
- Operators: Ouest; État; SNCF
- Class: Z 5000, Ouest; BB 001-10, État; BB 1800, SNCF
- Withdrawn: 1948–1956

The BB 1800 were motor luggage vans of SNCF. These were the so-called "first-series" Z 5000 locomotives ordered by the Chemins de fer de l'Ouest. They were put into service, with running numbers Z 5001 to Z 5010, on 12 April 1900, on the line from Paris-Invalides to Issy-Plaine, which was extended to Meudon on 1 July 1901 then to Versailles RG on 31 May 1902.

== Description ==
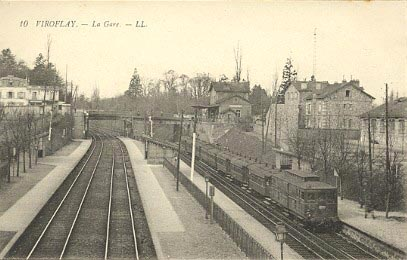
Suburban train hauled by a Z 5000 at Viroflay around 1900

The locomotives consisted of a wooden body covered with sheet metal and resting on a steel frame. Two large driving cabs, which also contained some of the electrical equipment, flanked a large baggage compartment. Two large sliding doors, one on each side, gave access to the baggage area.

All the locomotives had four traction motors, each with a continuous power rating of 92 kW (123 hp). Two transmission techniques were tried: five machines had Postel Vinay geared transmission and the other five had direct transmission by Brown-Boveri. Equipped with contact shoes for operation on 600 V DC third rail they were never converted for operation on 1,500 V DC catenary.

Z 5002, having been damaged by fire, was written off in 1907. From 1932, the nine remaining locomotives were modified: their motors were replaced by those recovered from État 1001 – 1018, withdrawn in 1927, they received Sprague-Thomson electrical equipment and their clerestory roofs and the long wooden steps were removed.

== Career and services ==
The line from Paris-Invalides to Versailles-Rive-Gauche was progressively electrified by a third rail supplied with direct current, initially at 550 V then later uprated to 600 V, between April 12, 1900, and 31 May 1902.

Assigned to Paris-Champ-de-Mars depot as soon as they were put into service in 1901, the Z 5000 class thus provided the first regular services on an electrified line in France and, as soon as they entered service, their performance far exceeded the requirements of the specifications.

In later years these locomotives hauled, amongst other things, short rakes of 4 OCEM Talbot cars, each rake consisting of three intermediate cars and a driving trailer, on the line from Puteaux to Issy-Plaine, from 1937 to, at least, 1942.

Initially classified as self-propelled luggage vans, Z 5001 to 5010, when they were put into service, they were renumbered as locomotives BB 001 to BB 010 in 1932 then BB 1801 to BB 1810 in 1950. At the end of their career, they were confined to shunting work inside the depot and were withdrawn by 1956. Their revenue services were taken over by Z 5100 multiple units.
