= Courbevoie station =

Railway station in Hauts-de-Seine department, France

Courbevoie
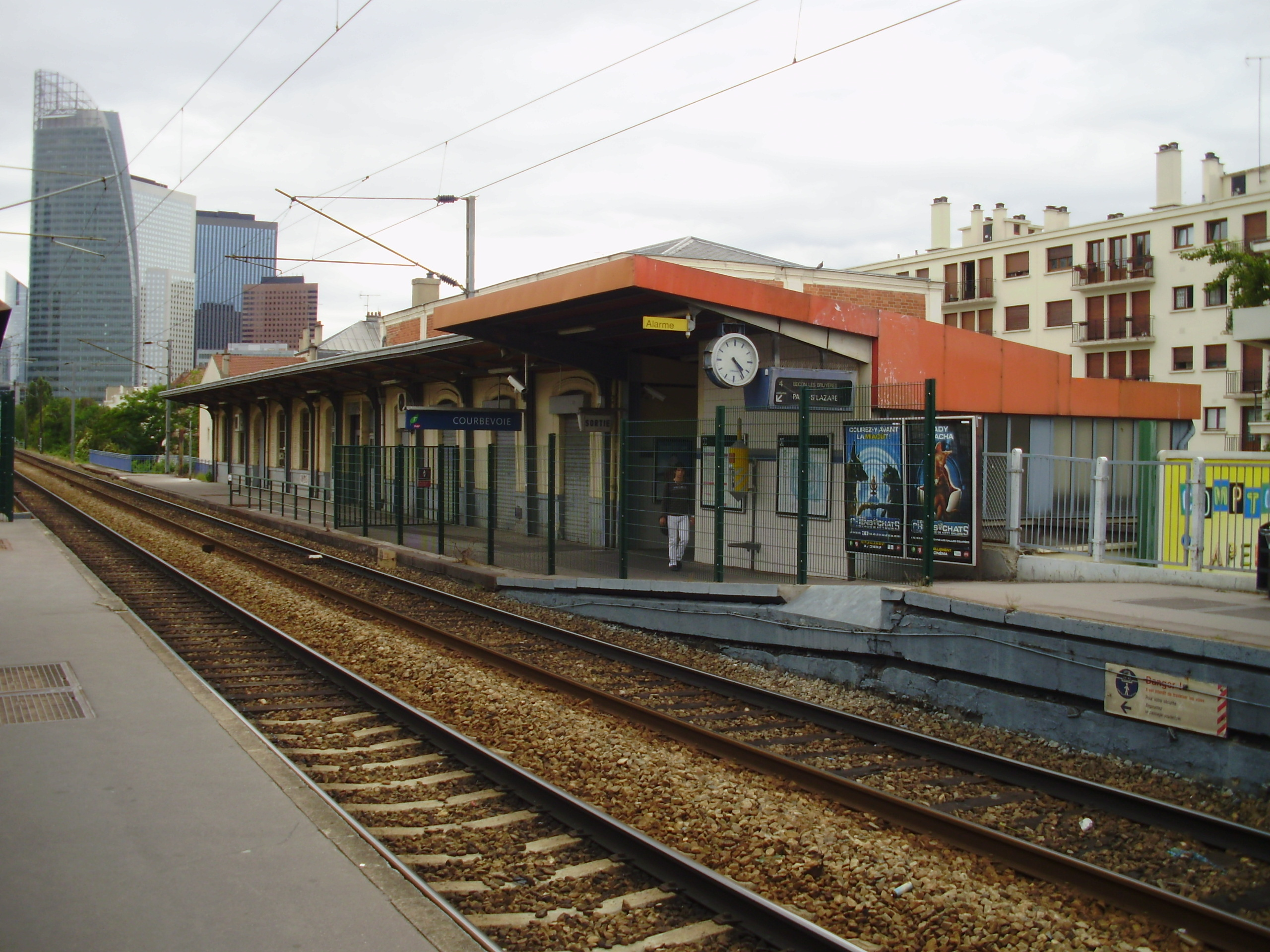

General information
- Location: Courbevoie, Hauts-de-Seine, Île-de-France; France
- Coordinates: 48°53′54″N 2°14′55″E
- Line: Line L
- Platforms: 2 side platforms
- Tracks: 2

Other information
- Station code: 87382200
- Fare zone: 3

History
- Opened: 1838

Passengers
- 2024: 4,647,654

Services
Preceding station	Transilien	Following station
La Défense towards Saint-Cloud	Line L	Bécon-les-Bruyères towards Paris–Saint Lazare
Location

Courbevoie is a railway station serving the town Courbevoie, Hauts-de-Seine department, in the western suburbs of Paris, France. It is served by Transilien Line L services between Paris Gare Saint-Lazare and Gare de Saint-Cloud.
