= Puteaux station =

Railway station in Puteaux, France

Puteaux
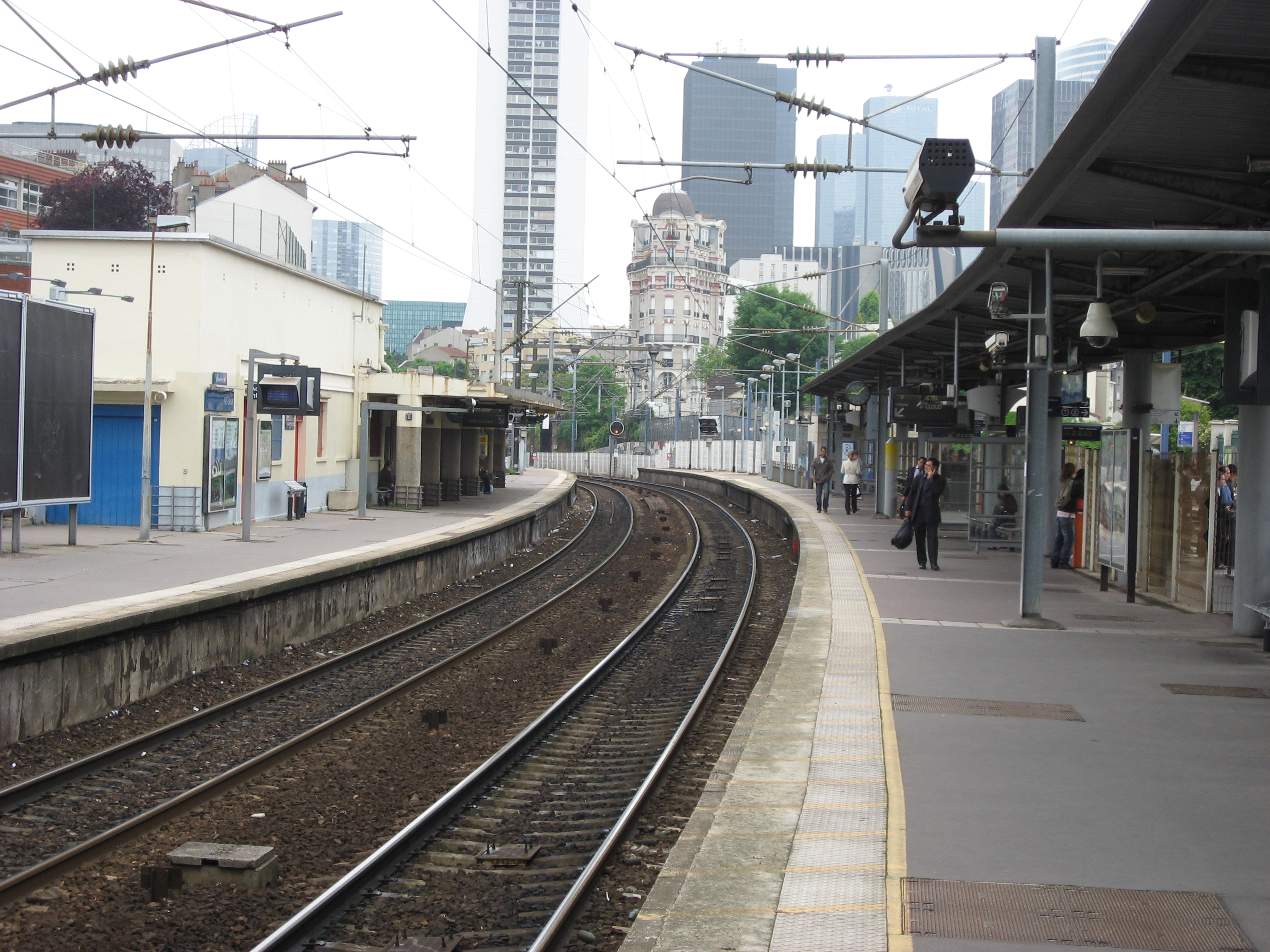

General information
- Location: Puteaux, Hauts-de-Seine, Île-de-France; France
- Coordinates: 48°53′1″N 2°14′1″E
- Line: Line L Line U
- Platforms: 2 (SNCF) / 2 (Tramway)
- Tracks: 2 (SNCF) / 2 (Tramway)

Other information
- Station code: 87382382
- Fare zone: 3

History
- Opened: 18 July 1840

Passengers
- 2024: 4,143,913

Services
| Preceding station | Transilien | Following station |
|---|---|---|
| Suresnes–Mont-Valérien towards Saint-Nom-la-Bretèche or Versailles–Rive Droite | Line L | La Défense towards Paris–Saint Lazare |
| Suresnes–Mont-Valérien towards La Verrière | Line U | La Défense Terminus |
| Preceding station | Tram | Following station |
| La Défense towards Pont de Bezons | T2 | Belvédère towards Porte de Versailles |
Location

Puteaux is a railway station in the town Puteaux, Hauts-de-Seine department, in the western suburbs of Paris, France.

The station originally opened on 18 July 1840, as part of the Paris to St Cloud and Versailles railway.
