= Transilien Line U =

Suburban rail service around Paris

Line U

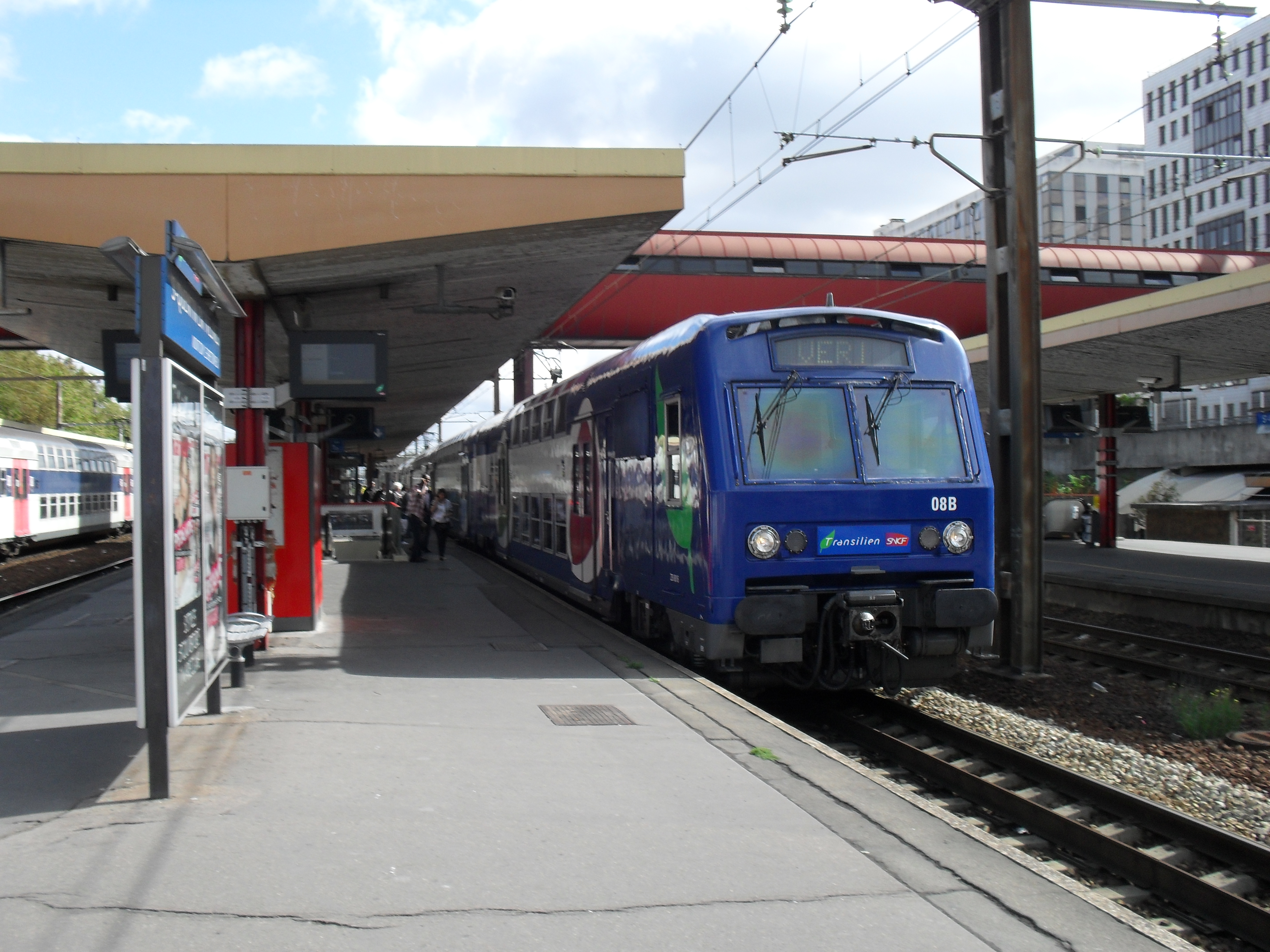
- A Z 8800 train at Saint-Quentin-en-Yvelines

Overview
- Other name: La Défense – La Verrière
- Termini: La Défense; La Verrière
- Stations: 11

Service
- Type: Commuter rail
- System: Transilien
- Operator: SNCF
- Depot: Trappes
- Rolling stock: Z8800
- Daily ridership: 55,000

History
- Opened: 1995

Technical
- Line length: 31 km (19 mi)
- Track gauge: 1,435 mm (4 ft 8 1/2 in)

Transilien Line U, also known as "La Défense - La Verrière" or more often simply "ligne U", is a tangential commuter train link, which serves the western Paris region from La Défense. It links the Paris's business district of La Défense to La Verrière station, in the south-west of Ile-de-France. It is one of the two commuter train lines in the Transilien network that does not originate from a large Parisian station, along with the V. The line has 55,000 passengers per weekday in 2014.

== Chronology ==
- 22 July 1988: A proposal is submitted to the Syndicat des transports parisiens for a suburb-to-suburb tangentielle line between Saint-Quentin-en-Yvelines and the business district of La Défense.
- July 1991: The proposal is approved by the Syndicat des transports parisiens, with the line reusing existing infrastructure from the Grande Ceinture line.
- 28 May 1995: The La Défense–Saint-Quentin-en-Yvelines line is opened to the public.
- end of 2004: The line is renamed Line U as part of a reworking of the Transilien network.

== History ==
On 2 August 1839 the current section linking La Défense to the Viroflay connection was put into service as part of the line from Paris-Saint-Lazare to Versailles-Rive-Droite. The latter is the second created in Île-de-France after the line from Paris-Saint-Lazare to Saint-Germain-en-Laye. It makes it possible to link Paris to Versailles in a shorter time, to bring many visitors to the castle, which is at the end of its restoration, and to bring economic development to the region.

The line is the result of the project of a bridge and road engineer, Desfontaines. He had proposed to join the line of Versailles right bank to that of Saint-Germain, which limited the costly expropriations, and also restricted the ramp to a value of 5 mm / m, at the cost of a slightly longer route.

On 12 July 1849 the section between the Viroflay connection and La Verrière station was opened in turn, as part of the line from Paris-Montparnasse to Brest.

In July 1852, the lines from Paris-Saint-Lazare to Versailles-Rive-Droite and from Paris-Montparnasse to Brest were linked together through the Viroflay connection.

On 22 July 1928 the section going from the current station of La Défense to the Viroflay connection (Line from Paris-Saint-Lazare to Versailles-Rive-Droite) was electrified, in direct current 650 V by 3rd rail. This electrification was accompanied by the installation of high platforms, the replacement of its ancient steam traction equipment, much criticized for its discomfort, by modern “Standard” trains, which remained emblematic of the Saint-Lazare suburb for more than fifty years .

In April 1959, a new stop was created on the line to La Défense. Its objective is to serve the Center for New Industries and Technologies or CNIT, but this stop is then considered temporary and is only open during events. The final station was only opened in 1968 with the aim of serving the business district which has been booming since the early 1960s.

== Infrastructure ==
=== Line ===
Line U connects La Défense station on the Saint-Lazare network to La Verrière station on the Montparnasse network. It is the result of the combined use of the following railway lines:

- Line from Paris-Saint-Lazare to Versailles-Rive-Droite, opened in 1839, between La Défense and the entrance to the Viroflay connection
- Line from Paris-Montparnasse to Brest, opened in 1849, between the exit of the Viroflay and La Verrière connection
- Viroflay connection, opened in 1852, between the two aforementioned lines.

=== Supply voltages ===
The line is divided into two parts for the power supply, a situation which stems from the history of the electrification of the national rail network and which requires the use of dual-current equipment.

The line from Paris-Saint-Lazare to Versailles-Rive Droite, like the entire Paris-Saint-Lazare network, is electrified at 25 kV AC single-phase. The line from Paris-Montparnasse to Brest is electrified in 1.5 kV DC to Le Mans, included. A neutral section is located on the Viroflay connection, where trains swap voltages.

=== Speed limits ===
The authorized speed limits, in 2011/2012, for suburban trains, on direct tracks are indicated below.

From (PK)	To (PK)	Limit kph (mph)
La Défense (PK 8,3)	Sèvres - Ville-d'Avray (PK 16,6)	90 (55.9)
Sèvres - Ville-d'Avray (PK 16,6)	Viroflay connection input (PK 19,3)	110 (68.3)
Viroflay connection input (PK 19,3)	Viroflay connection output (PK 14,3)	90 (55.9)
Viroflay connection output (PK 14,3)	Saint-Cyr (Granville junction) (PK 21,9)	130 (80.7)
Saint-Cyr (Granville junction) (PK 21,9)	La Verrière (PK 32,2)	140 (87)

PK is "Point Kilométrique" (kilometer point)

== List of Line U stations ==
- La Défense
- Puteaux
- Suresnes-Mont-Valérien
- Saint-Cloud
- Sèvres–Ville-d'Avray
- Chaville-Rive-Droite
- Versailles-Chantiers
- Saint-Cyr
- Saint-Quentin-en-Yvelines–Montigny-le-Bretonneux
- Trappes
- La Verrière

Major stations:

- La Défense

The eastern terminus of the line, La Défense station offers a connection with metro line 1, RER A, tram line T2 and line L of the Transilien Paris Saint-Lazare network. In the future, the tangential line U will correspond with the western extension of the RER E (Éole), to Mantes-la-Jolie, from its current terminus of Haussmann - Saint-Lazare. Line E of the RER will pass through La Défense.

- Versailles-Chantiers

At the center of a seven-branch railway star, the station offers a connection with the RER C, the Transilien line N, and the TER Center-Val de Loire and TER Basse-Normandie services. The Main Lines network serves Versailles-Chantiers station with the stopping of some Intercity or TGV trains.

- Saint-Quentin-en-Yvelines–Montigny-le-Bretonneux

This important station, in terms of attendance, is the main station of the agglomeration of Saint-Quentin-en-Yvelines. It connects with line N of the Transilien Paris-Montparnasse network (connecting Paris-Montparnasse to Rambouillet) and is the terminus of one of the western branches of the RER C

== Operation ==
Line U is a line operated by the SNCF, from La Défense to La Verrière, which operates from 5 am to midnight, using sixteen Z 8800 trains. These trains use the Viroflay connection which was, at this time, occasionally open to commercial traffic, in order to connect the extreme terminals in 43 minutes. In addition, during the week, the line provides 89 daily departures.

It does not work during the special night service set up on the occasion of important events such as the Music Festival and New Year's Eve, between 1 a.m. and 5 a.m.

A study, published in the newspaper 20 minutes presented this link as the penultimate of Île-de-France in terms of respect for timetables, because it is a transverse link directly influenced by traffic from Montparnasse and Saint-Lazare networks and to be part of saturated traffic between La Défense and Saint-Cloud, and between Versailles-Chantiers and Saint-Quentin-en-Yvelines.

=== Names of codes Missions ===
The mission codes for line U of the Transilien consist of four letters. By appearing on the display screens (Infogare) and on the nose of the trains, they make it easier to understand the various missions carried out:

1st letter: destination of the train

- D : La Défense
- V : La Verrière

2nd, 3rd and 4th letters

The last three letters make it possible to make the mission code pronounceable, since all the missions provide service to all the stations along the U line route.

Destinations	Mission Codes (regular only)
La Défense	DEFI
La Verrière	VERI

Since 14 December 2014, the service on line U has been organized as indicated below, for each direction.

From Monday to Friday, from 6.30 a.m. to 9 a.m. and from 4.30 p.m. to 8 p.m., there is a train every quarter of an hour during rush hour. On Sundays, from 6.30 a.m. to 11 a.m. and every day from 8.30 p.m. to approximately 1 a.m., the offer is one train per hour.

The rest of the time, i.e. 5:30 a.m. to 6:30 a.m. and 9 a.m. to 4:30 p.m. Monday to Friday, 5:30 a.m. to 8:30 p.m. Saturday and 11 a.m. to 8 p.m. 30 on Sunday, a train every half hour is offered.

All the stations on the line are equipped with the "Infogare" information system, funded by the Île-de-France region and the Île-de-France transport union: screens located on the platforms and in the stations provide timely information travelers of the waiting time train as well as disruptions that may occur on the line.

On board the trains, a passenger information system indicates, in an audible and luminous manner, the stations served and the train's progress in real time on the line through the on-board passenger information system (SIVSE).

=== Trainset ===
Currently, 22 in number, the Z 8800s are coupled in pairs (UM2) during peak hours, in order to be able to double the capacity. Since July 2015, four Z 8800 trainsets coming from the RER C have joined the staff of line U (i.e. 24 trainsets).

All the trains on this U line have the possibility of traveling on the N line (in particular to carry out the SOPI-POSI mission trains), the equipment being provided with the plans of the two lines.

=== Workshops ===
Line U rolling stock is maintained in the Trappes workshop, in Yvelines.

In March 2005, a new equipment maintenance workshop opened along the tracks of the Trappes yard in Yvelines, replacing an existing workshop, at a cost of close to twelve million euros, entirely financed by SNCF.

It is equipped with three tracks (two electrified and one non-electrified) with an inspection pit, one of which has a switchable 1,500/25,000 volts catenary. Elevating cradles allow work at height.

It also takes care of the maintenance of the twenty Z 5600 6 cars trainsets “Evolys”, on line C of the RER and around sixty Corail cars. It also provides level 3 maintenance of TER 2N Center and Normandy. In addition, it has nearby a washing machine, a pit tower and a preparation site for cleaning and small maintenance operations.

=== Traffic ===
At the start of 2017, according to SNCF estimates, the number of passengers going up daily in the line's stations was 52,000 on a basic working day (Tuesday or Thursday), 16,000 on Saturday and 10,000 on Sunday.

== See also ==
- List of Transilien stations
