= La Défense station =

Railway station in France

La Défense Grande Arche
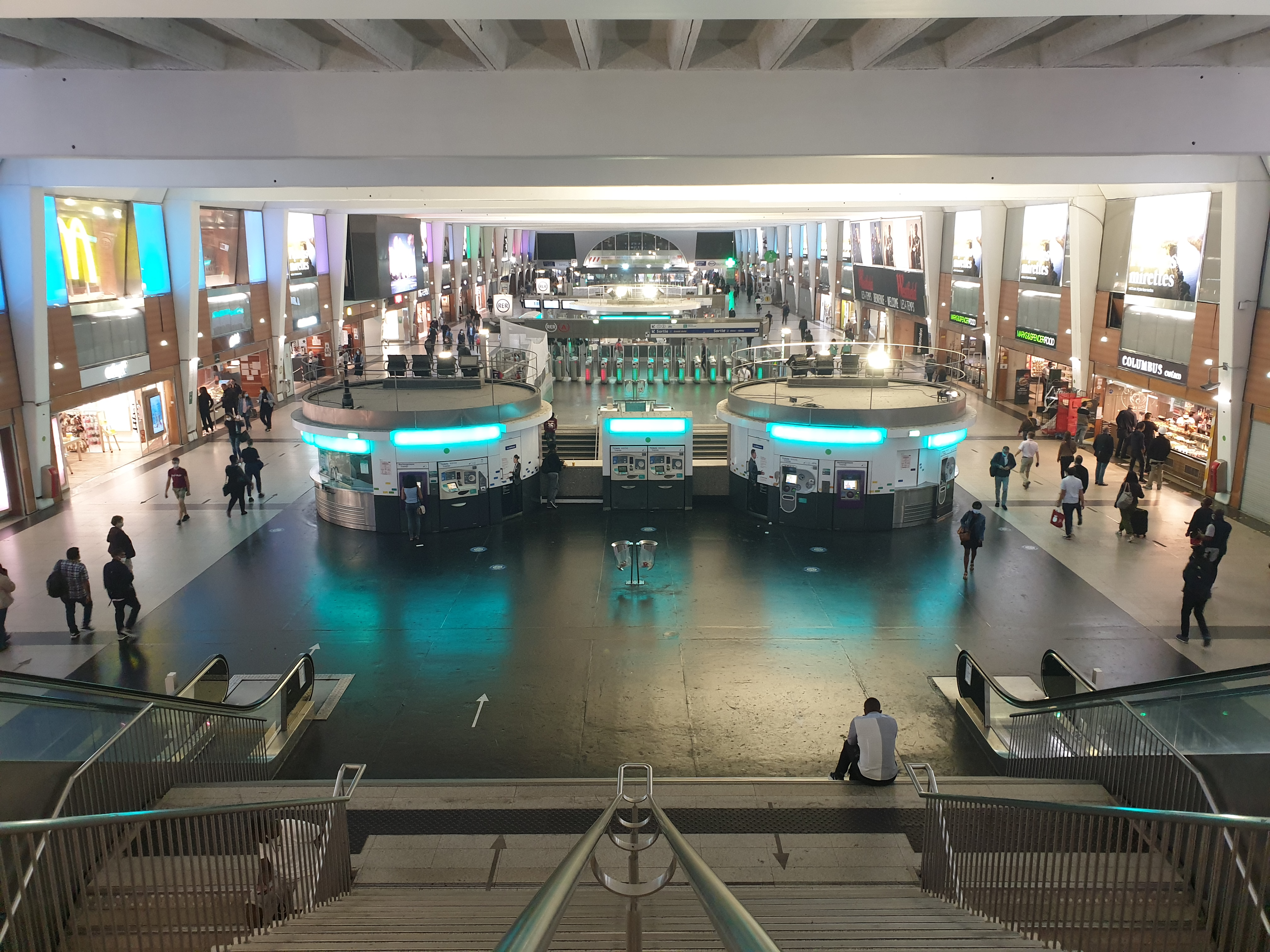
- RER A station view in August 2020

General information
- Location: La Défense; Puteaux; France
- Coordinates: 48°53′31″N 2°14′19″E
- Operator: SNCF & RATP Group
- Platforms: Métro: 2 side platforms; RER: 2 island platforms; Tramway: 1 island platform; Transilien: 2 island platforms
- Tracks: Métro: 2; RER: 4; Tramway: 2; Transilien: 4

Construction
- Accessible: Metro: Yes; RER A: Yes, by request to staff; RER E: Yes, by prior reservation; Tramway: Yes; Transilien: Yes, by prior reservation

Other information
- Station code: 87758011 / 87731430; 87382218
- Fare zone: 3

History
- Opened: April 1959; 67 years ago

Passengers
- 2024: 31,729,688
- Rank: 11th in France

Services
| Preceding station | Paris Metro | Following station |
|---|---|---|
| Terminus | Line 1 | Esplanade de La Défense towards Château de Vincennes |
| Preceding station | RER | Following station |
| Nanterre-Préfecture towards Saint-Germain-en-Laye, Cergy-le-Haut or Poissy | RER A | Charles de Gaulle–Étoile towards Boissy-Saint-Léger or Marne-la-Vallée–Chessy |
| Nanterre–La Folie Terminus | RER E | Neuilly–Porte Maillot towards Chelles–Gournay or Tournan |
| Preceding station | Transilien | Following station |
| Puteaux towards Saint-Nom-la-Bretèche or Versailles–Rive Droite | Line L | Courbevoie towards Paris–Saint Lazare |
| Puteaux towards La Verrière | Line U | Terminus |
| Preceding station | Tram | Following station |
| Faubourg de l'Arche towards Pont de Bezons | T2 | Puteaux towards Porte de Versailles |
Route map
Line 1
RER A
RER E
Location

La Défense station (French pronunciation: [la defɑ̃s]) is a station of the Transilien (Réseau Saint-Lazare) suburban rail lines, the RER A and RER E commuter rail lines, and Line 1 of the Paris Métro, as well as a stop on the Île-de-France tramway Line 2. In the future, the station will also be served by Paris Metro Line 15, part of the Grand Paris Express transit project. It is located underneath the Grande Arche in La Défense, the business district located to the west of Paris.

A temporary station on the site was first completed in April 1959 in order to serve the newly-built Centre of New Industries and Technologies (CNIT); initially, the station was served solely by a special event-only SNCF service before the opening of the RER A link on 19 January 1970. Paris Metro services came to the station with the opening of the Line 1 extension to Pont de Neuilly on 1 April 1992, while RER E services commenced with the opening of the line's extension to Nanterre–La Folie on 6 May 2024.

Highlights on the surface nearby include the monumental Grande Arche, skyscrapers that host the headquarters of several major French and foreign companies, and works of urban art such as Le Pouce by César Baldaccini. From the central esplanade, the Arc de Triomphe can be viewed down the Axe historique. Like the district it serves, the station takes its name from the 19th-century statue La Défense de Paris, commemorating the Franco-Prussian War.

== Passenger services ==
=== Access ===
The station is built around the Cœur Transport interchange complex, a multimodal hub containing the RER A station, the Transilien station, the station of line 1 of the Paris metro, the station of the T2 tramway and a bus station. The central area consists of a large passenger hall with an SNCF ticket office, numerous RATP ticket offices, and various retail concessions. The complex is directly connected to the Les Quatre Temps shopping center and the Centre of New Industries and Technologies (CNIT). The other primary structure of the station is the salle des colonnes (lit. 'column room'), which provides direct access to the Transilien platforms.

While most of the entrances lead to the interchange complex, there are several entrances to individual platforms; an entrance located on Place Carpeaux leads directly to the tram station (as well as, indirectly, to the Transilien station via an underpass). The RER E station has three external accesses: from the forecourt of the Grande Arche, in the CNIT (called La faille) and on Avenue Gambetta in Courbevoie. It is connected from its mezzanine to the Cœur Transport via the CNIT. Direct access is also available to the RER A station and to the Transilien/tramway station thanks to two separate underground corridors. Lifts allow access to the various stations for people with reduced mobility.

Internet access via Wi-Fi is available throughout the station.

=== Station layout ===
| 0 | Street level | Entrances/exits |
| -1 | Platforms | Tramways in Île-de-France Île-de-France tramway Line 2 Transilien Transilien Line L (Paris-Saint-Lazare) Transilien Line U |
| -2 | Mezzanine | to entrances/exits passageway to RER/Transilien lines |
| -3 | Platform 1 | ← termination platform |
| -3 | Side platform with PSDs, doors will open on the left |
| -3 | Side platform with PSDs, doors will open on the left |
| -3 | Platform 2 | toward Château de Vincennes (Esplanade de La Défense) → |
| -4 | Platform 1 | toward Boissy-Saint-Léger or Marne-la-Vallée–Chessy (Charles de Gaulle–Étoile) → |
| -4 | Island platform, doors will open on the left, right |
| -4 | Platform A | toward Boissy-Saint-Léger or Marne-la-Vallée–Chessy (Charles de Gaulle–Étoile) → |
| -4 | Platform B | ← toward Saint Germain-en-Laye, Cergy-le-Haut or Poissy (Nanterre-Préfecture) |
| -4 | Island platform, doors will open on the left, right |
| -4 | Platform 2 | ← toward Saint Germain-en-Laye, Cergy-le-Haut or Poissy (Nanterre-Préfecture) |
| -5 | Platform 1 | toward Chelles–Gournay or Tournan (Neuilly–Porte Maillot) → |
| -5 | Island platform, doors will open on the right |
| -5 | Platform 2 | ← toward Nanterre–La Folie (Terminus) |

- Note: The two side platforms for Metro Line 1 are located some distance apart, as opposed to one island platform.

=== Services ===
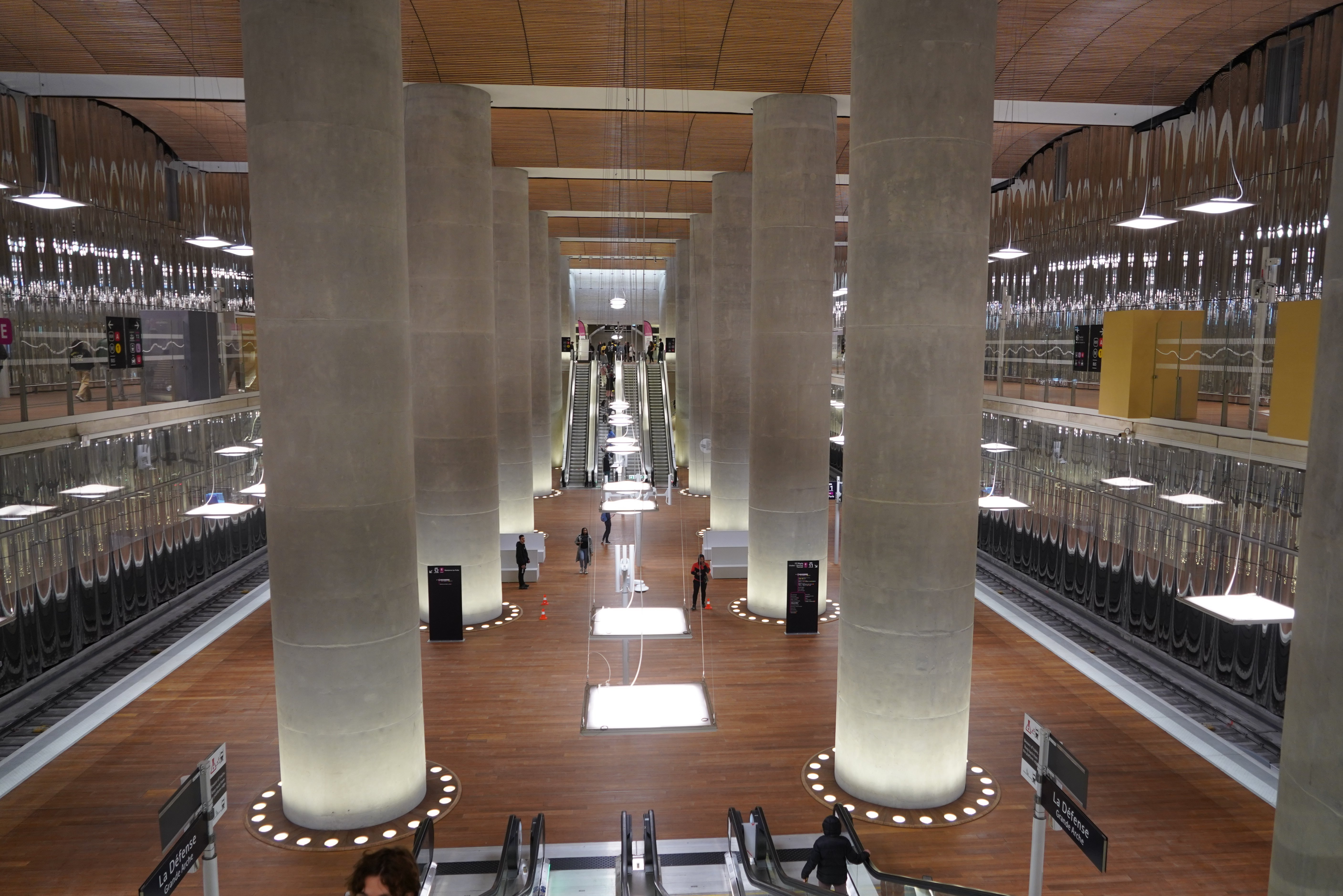
RER E station

- RER Line A and Line E
- Paris St Lazare Group III :
  - SNCF Gare Saint-Lazare – St Nom la Breteche–Forêt de Marly
  - SNCF Gare Saint-Lazare – Versailles Rive Droite
- SNCF La Défense – La Verrière
- Île-de-France tramway Line 2

There are four platforms in the Transilien station :

In the morning:

- Platforms 1 and 3 are used for PSL Group III lines to Paris
- Platform 2 is used for PSL Group III lines to Versailles Rive Droite / St Nom la Breteche – Forêt de Marly
- Platform 4 is used for La Défense – La Verrière line

In the afternoon:

- Platform 1 is used for PSL Group III lines to Paris
- Platforms 2 and 4 are used for PSL Group III lines to Versailles Rive Droite / St Nom la Breteche – Forêt de Marly
- Platform 3 is used for La Défense – La Verrière line

The RATP bus station has a particularity: passengers wait in a long hall in front of automatic doors that open when the buses arrive. The bus station and the Jules-Verne Terminal are served by :

- lines 73, 141, 144, 159, 174, 178, 258, 275, 276, 278 and 360 of the RATP bus network;
- lines 5432, 7820, 7823, 7825 of the Mantois bus network;
- lines 7821, 7822 of the Poissy - Les Mureaux bus network;
- the A14 Chambourcy line of the Saint-Germain Boucles de Seine bus network;
- the N24 line of the Noctilien network.

Since May 2024, "aerobus" shuttles have been in service to reach Paris-Beauvais airport

== Gallery ==
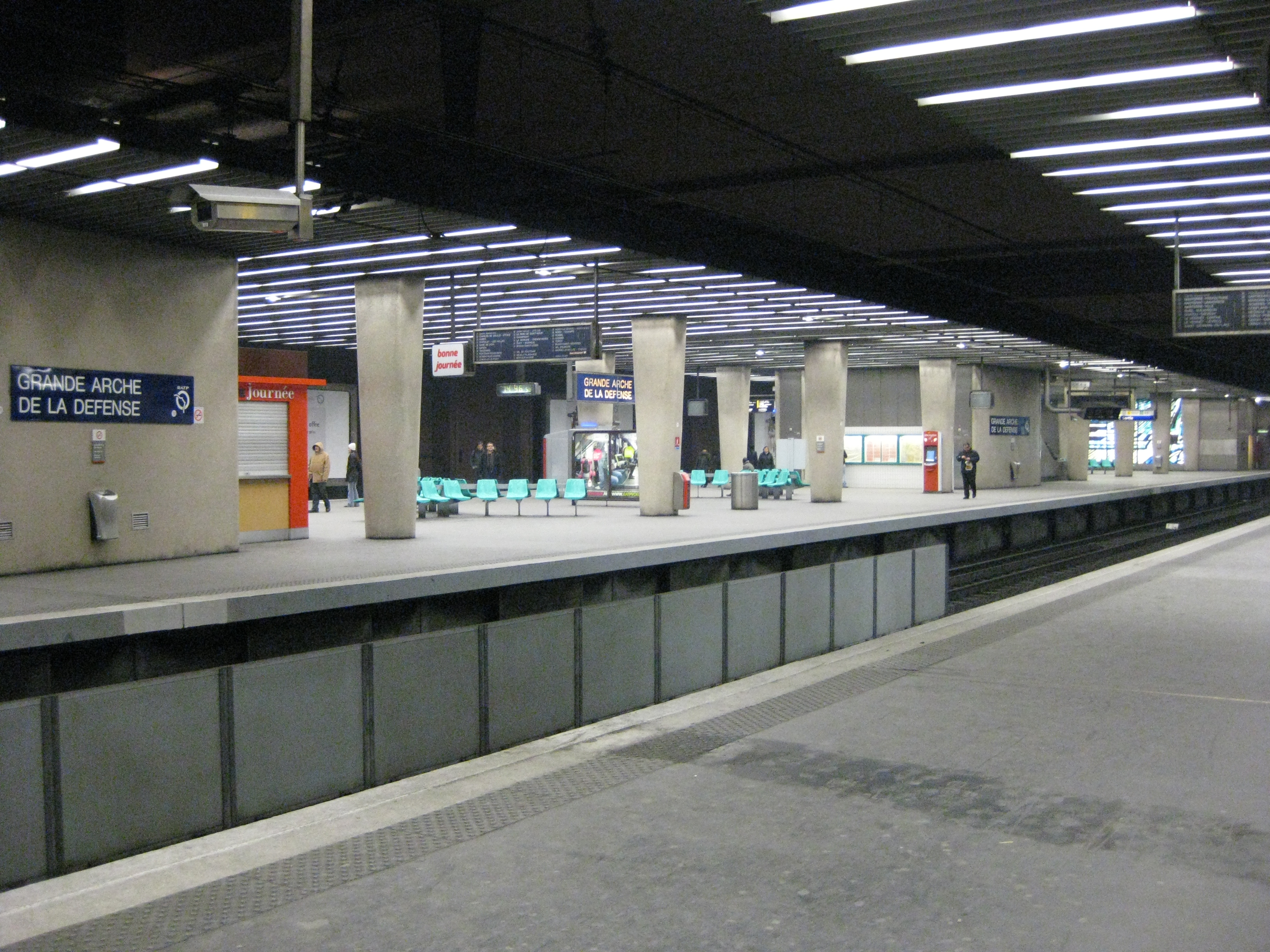
RER A platforms

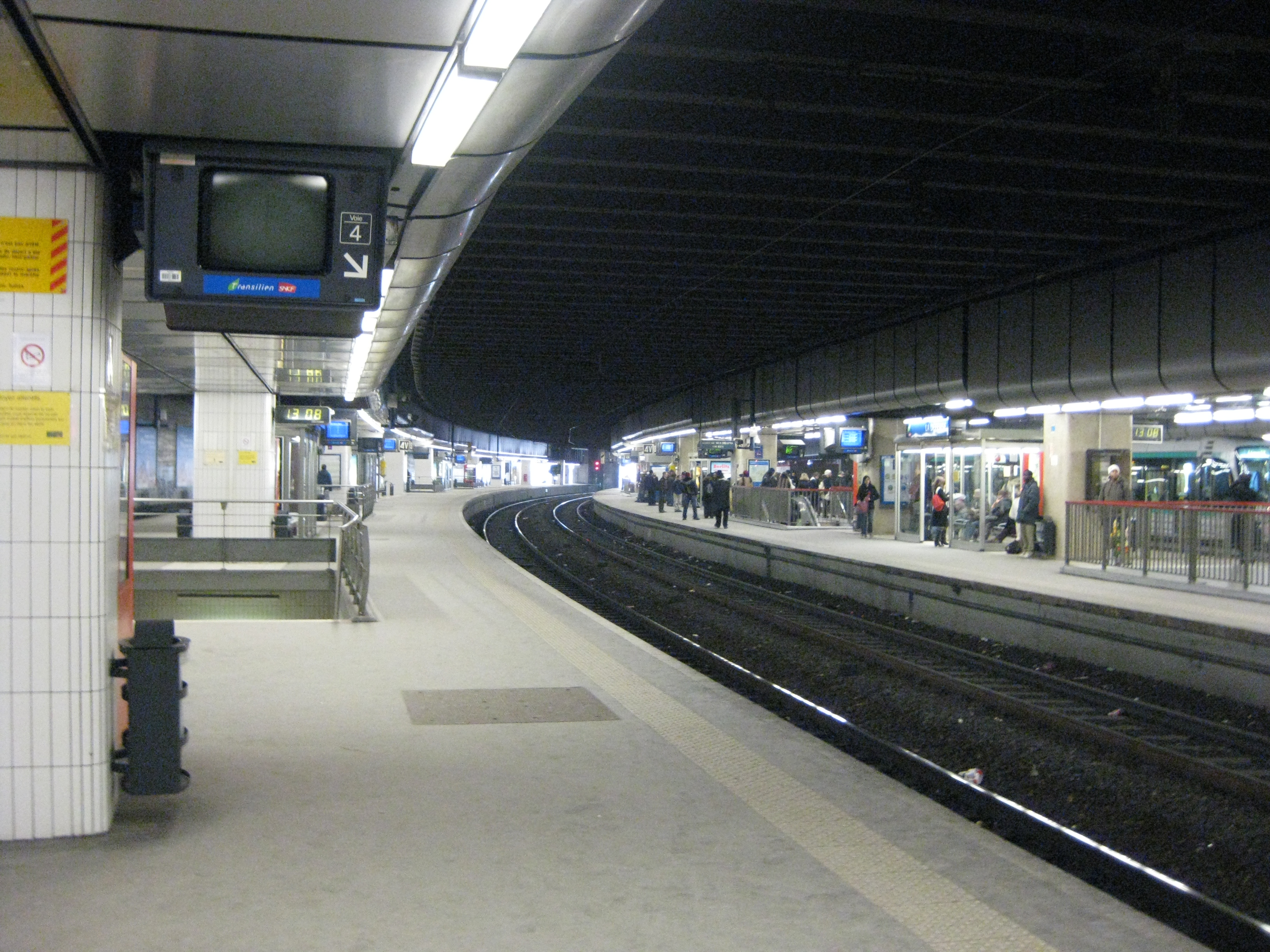
Transilien platforms

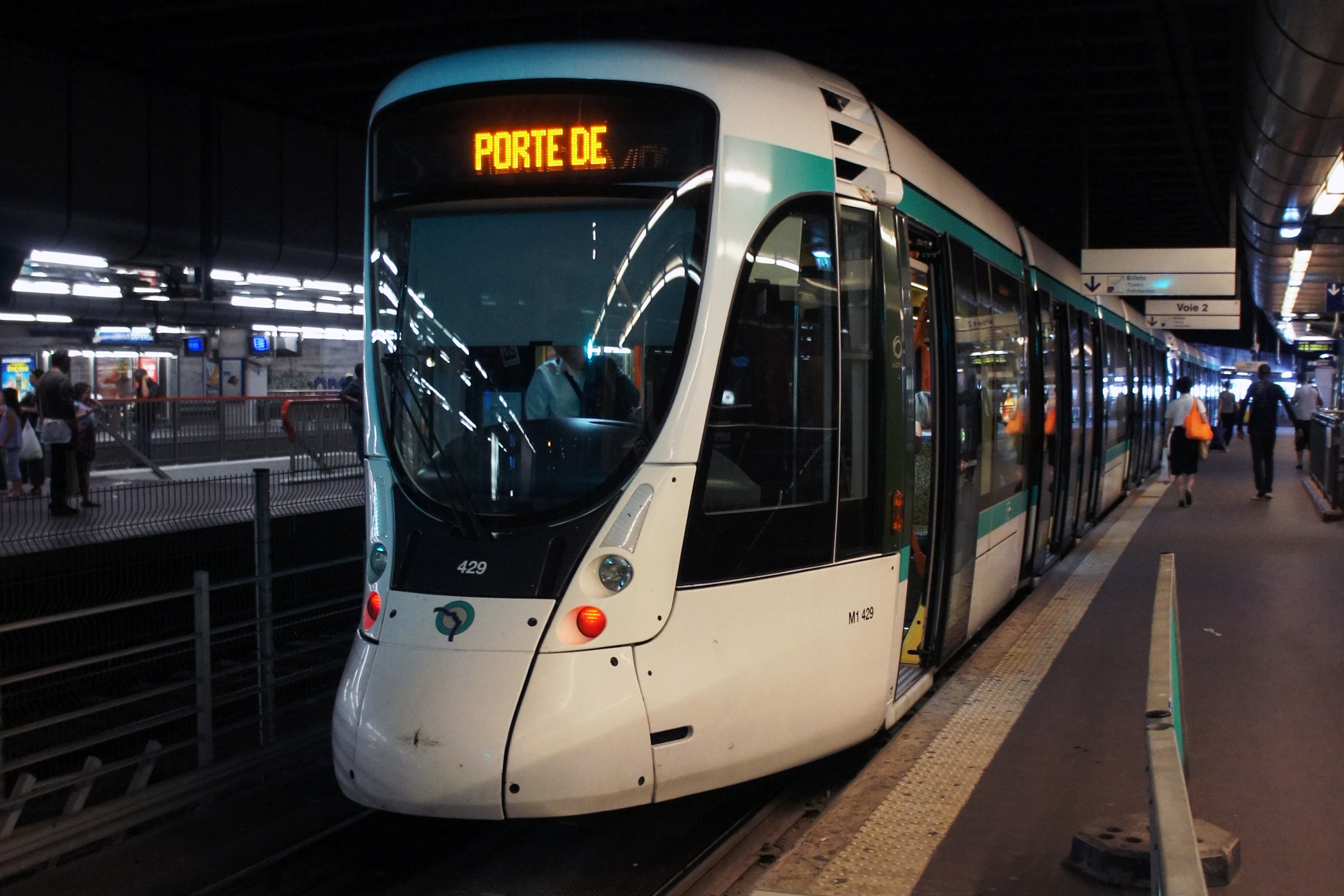
Paris Tramway Line 2 platform

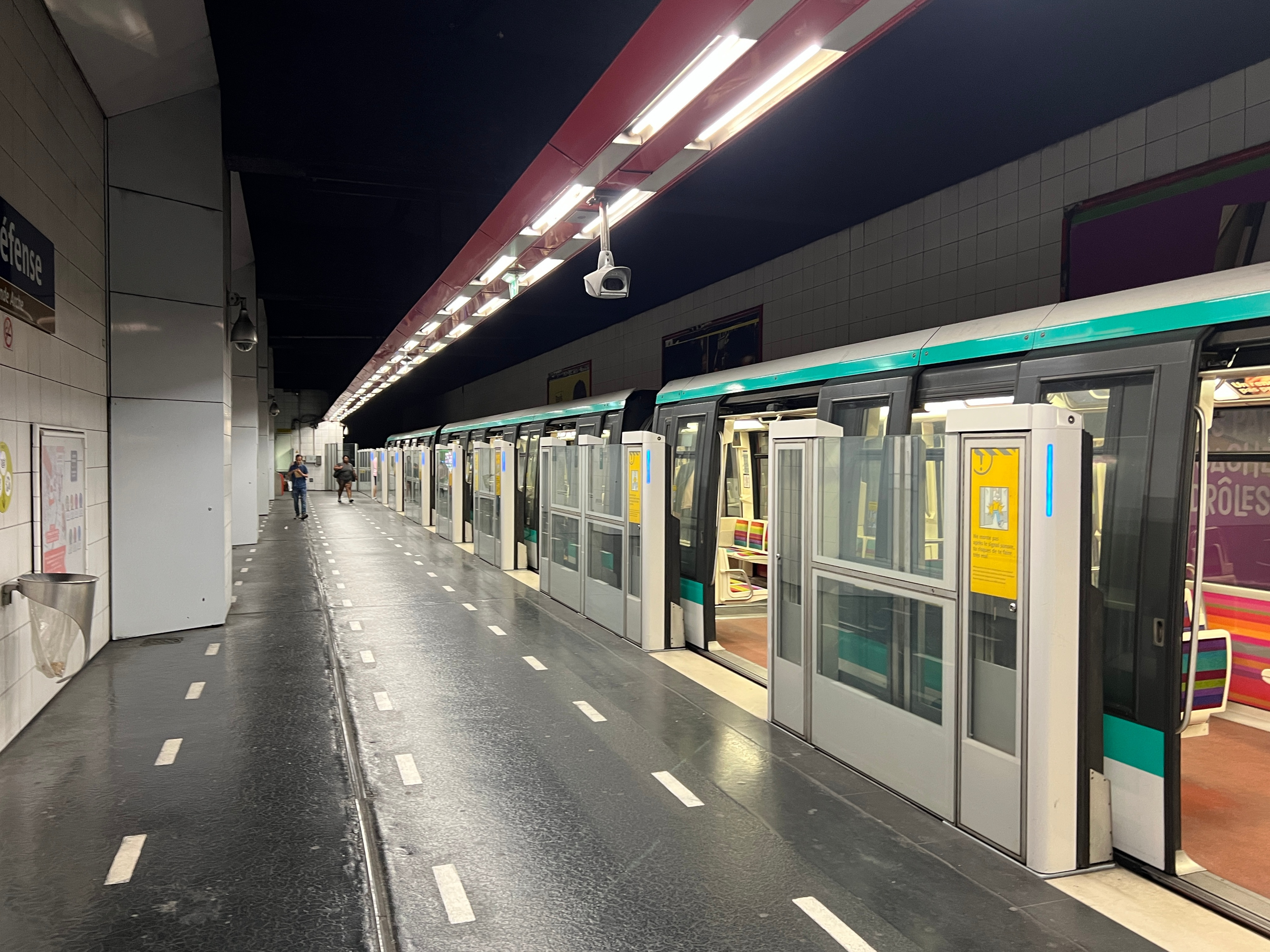
MP 05 on Line 1

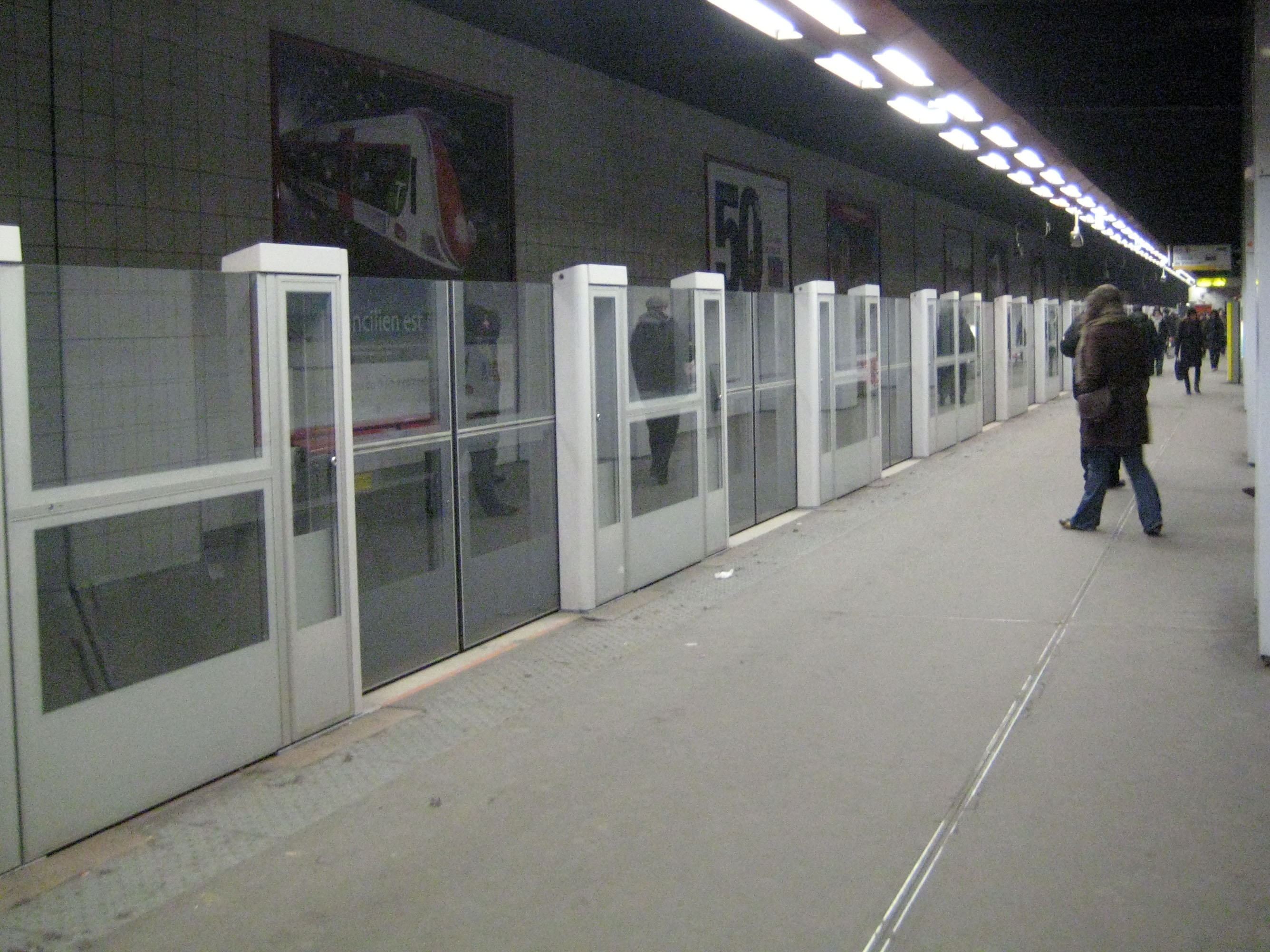
New automatic platform gates on eastbound platform
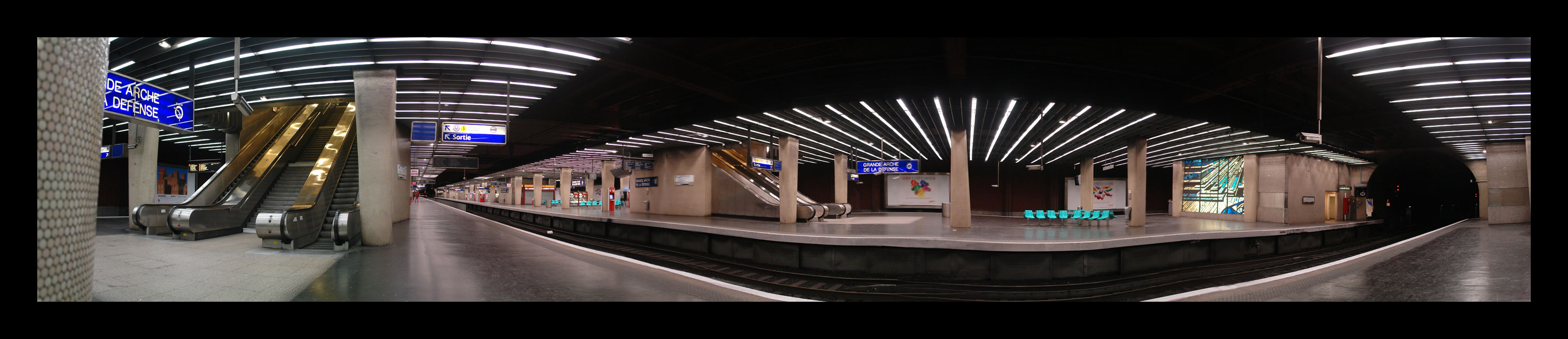
La Défense RER platform panorama

== In popular culture ==
The 1979 French film Buffet froid begins at La Défense station.

== See also ==
- List of stations of the Paris Métro
- List of stations of the Paris RER

== Bibliography ==
- Roland, Gérard (2003). Stations de métro. D’Abbesses à Wagram. Éditions Bonneton.
