= Versailles Rive Droite station =

Railway station in Versailles, France

Versailles Rive Droite
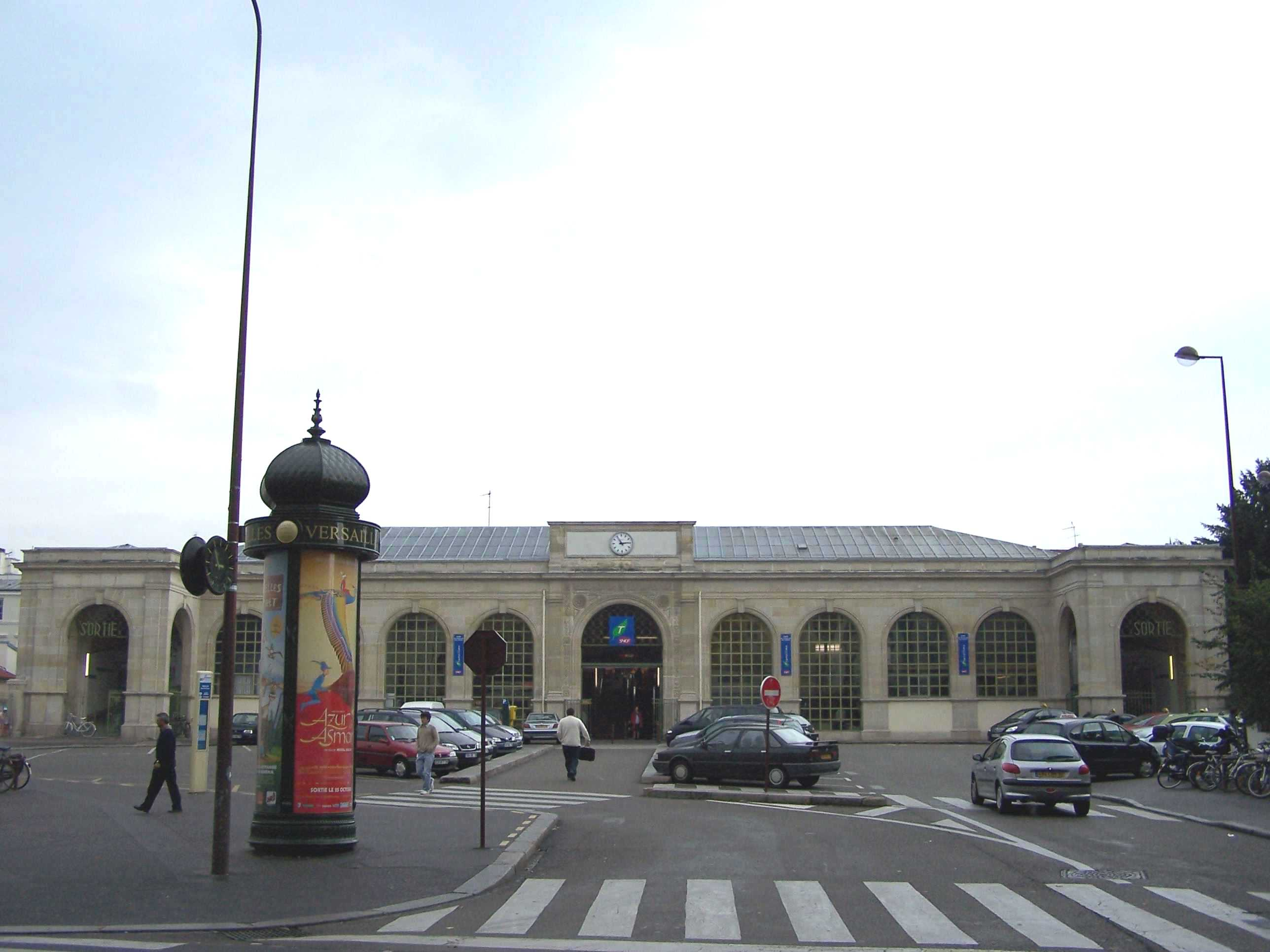
- Versailles Rive Droite station entrance

General information
- Location: 40 Rue du Maréchal Foch; Versailles; France
- Coordinates: 48°48′35″N 2°8′5″E
- Operator: SNCF
- Platforms: 1 island platform
- Tracks: 2 + 9 siding

Construction
- Structure type: At-grade
- Accessible: Yes, by prior reservation

Other information
- Station code: 87382861
- Fare zone: 4

History
- Opened: 4 August 1839

Passengers
- 2024: 5,967,149

Services
Preceding station	Transilien	Following station
Terminus	Line L	Montreuil towards Paris–Saint Lazare
Location

Versailles Rive Droite station (French pronunciation: [veʁsaij ʁiv dʁwat]) is a terminal railway station serving the city of Versailles, a wealthy suburb located west of Paris, France. The "Rive Droite" (English: Right Bank) in the station's name refers to the trains' destination of Paris–Saint Lazare station being on the right bank of the Seine river.

The station is operated by SNCF, the French national railway. It is served by Line L of the Paris Region's commuter rail system, the Transilien.

The station is one of several in Versailles, but sees fewer trains than the main Versailles Chantiers station, and is not located as close to the Palace of Versailles as Versailles Château Rive Gauche station.

== History ==
James Mayer de Rothschild received the concession to build a rail line from Paris to Versailles. Designed by state engineers, the line shared a common trunk from Gare Saint-Lazare to Asnières-sur-Seine. The line was opened by the sons of Louis-Philippe on 2 August 1839.

The station was designed by the architect Alfred Armand.

== Services ==
The station is served by line L trains of the Transilien Paris – Saint Lazare network. It is the terminus of the eponymous branch of the Transilien L South network.

It is one of five stations in Versailles. It is a terminal station with two tracks at platform, as well as six siding tracks and two yard leads, and it serves as a coach yard for line L South.

== See also ==
- Other train stations in Versailles:
  - Versailles Chantiers station (main station)
  - Versailles Château Rive Gauche station (terminal station, closest to Palace of Versailles)
  - Montreuil station
  - Porchefontaine station
