= Notre-Dame International High School =

Notre Dame International High School
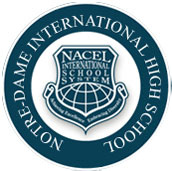

Location
- 106, Grande Rue; 78480 Verneuil-sur-Seine; France; 48.9827°N 1.9737°E

Information
- Type: Bilingual school, International school, Boarding school
- Motto: "Grow up together"
- Established: 2010
- Dean: Guillaume LESAGE, Principal
- Headmistress: Emilie CHAMPEIX
- Grades: 10 - 12
- Enrollment: 50 international students on a campus of 3000 students
- Affiliation: COGNIA
- Website: https://www.ndihs.com/

Notre-Dame International High School (NDIHS) in Verneuil-sur-Seine, a residential area west of Paris, France, is a private bilingual international school. The school is part of the Notre-Dame Les Oiseaux École Notre-Dame les Oiseaux campus and operates within a bilingual and multicultural educational environment. Notre-Dame Les Oiseaux school was established in 1929 on the site of the 16th-century Château de Verneuil Château de Verneuil-sur-Seine. This is one of the American schools in Paris metropolitan area. The school welcomes students aged approximately 15 to 18 (Grades 10 to 12) from around the world. It delivers an American-style college preparatory curriculum taught in English, leading to the US High School Diploma. Students also benefit from French language instruction and cultural immersion as part of their academic experience.

Notre-Dame International High School also provides boarding facilities on campus, including both 5-day and 7-day boarding options.

Students who come from many different countries receive an American-based curriculum leading to the American High School diploma. The school offers Advanced Placement (AP) courses with College Board.

The school is COGNIA accredited.

== Location ==
Notre-Dame International High School is located on the campus of Notre-Dame Les Oiseaux in the residential town of Verneuil-sur-Seine in the West of Paris.

== History ==
Notre-Dame International High School was founded in 2010 thanks to a partnership between Notre-Dame Les Oiseaux and Nacel in France.

== Campus ==
The Château de Verneuil Château de Verneuil-sur-Seine is located in the heart of an historical park covering an area of 13 hectares with centuries-old trees and gardens.

== Education ==
This French-American school of the Paris metropolitan area teaches an American secondary school curriculum developed at Nacel Open Door and leads to an American High School diploma in the French-speaking environment of Notre-Dame Les Oiseaux.

AP program The school offers the following AP courses: AP Seminar AP Human Geography AP Biology AP Calculus AB AP World History AP Business and Personal Finance AP Comparative Government AP English Language and Literature AP French

In addition to the American curriculum taught by American teachers (ESL, Math, English, Social Studies, Science), the school offers French language and culture programs as well as enrichment courses taught by French teachers (Art and Physical Education).

== Connections ==
=== Train service ===
The school is remotely connected with the train station, served by trains of Transilien J towars Paris-Saint-Lazare and Mantes-la-Jolie or Vernon–Giverny.

=== Bus connections ===
The school is also connected with these bus lines:

- Mantois: 5409, 5484
- Poissy - Les Mureaux: 6518 6524 6566 6569 6572 6575 6576 6578 6579

== Gallery ==
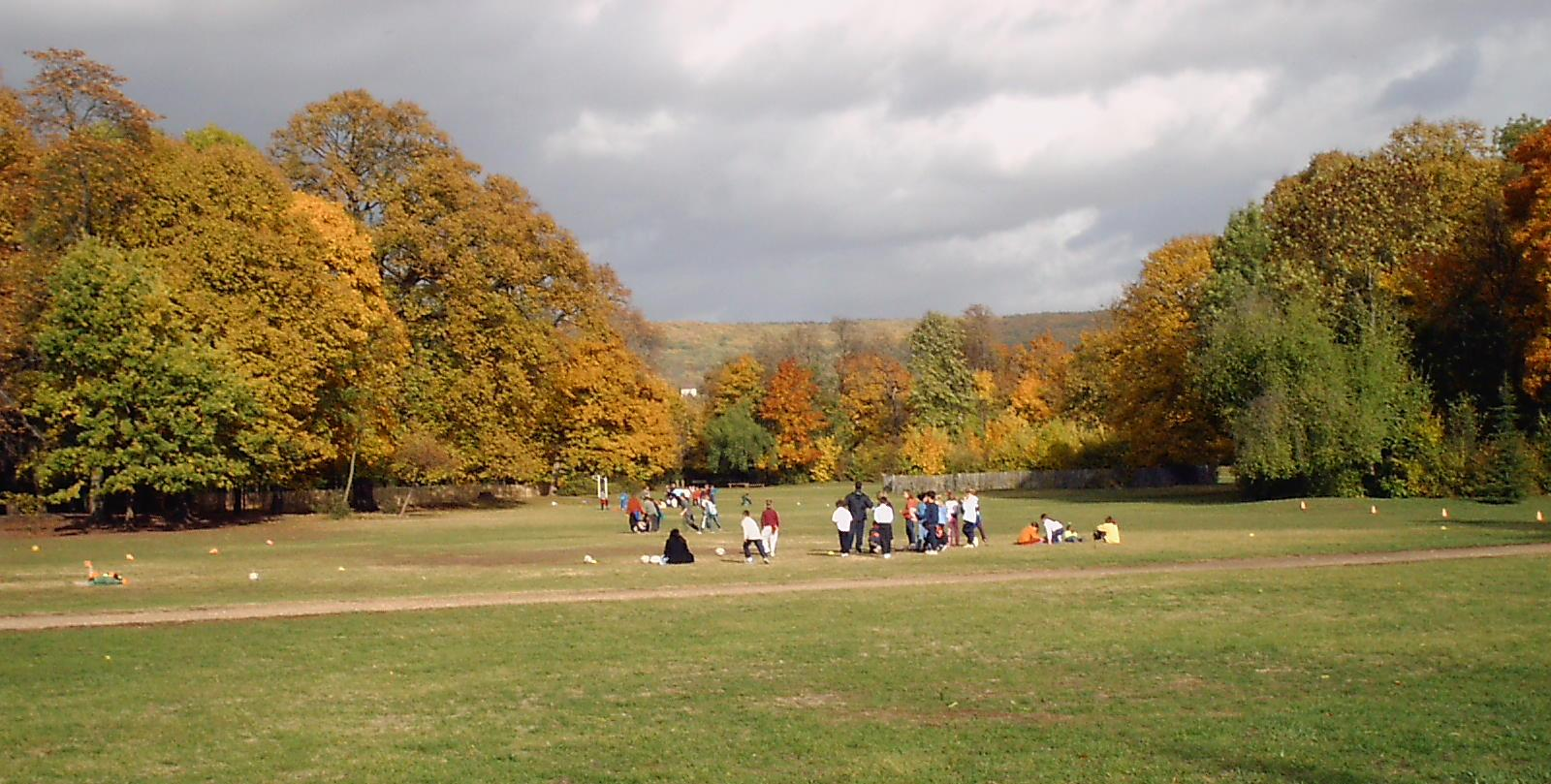
Notre-Dame International High School campus

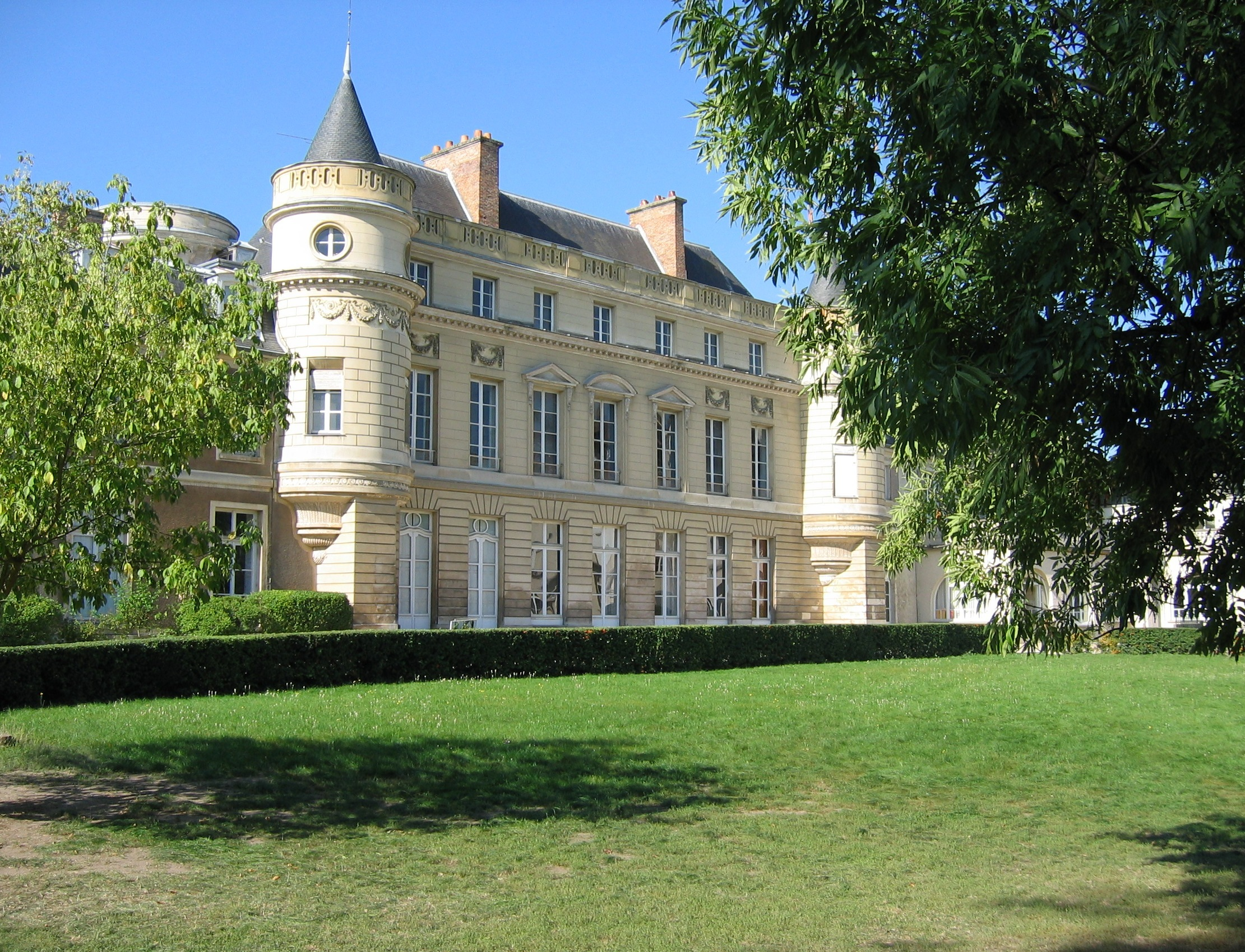
Notre-Dame International High School
