= Poissy – Les Mureaux bus network =

Public bus network in France

Poissy – Les Mureaux
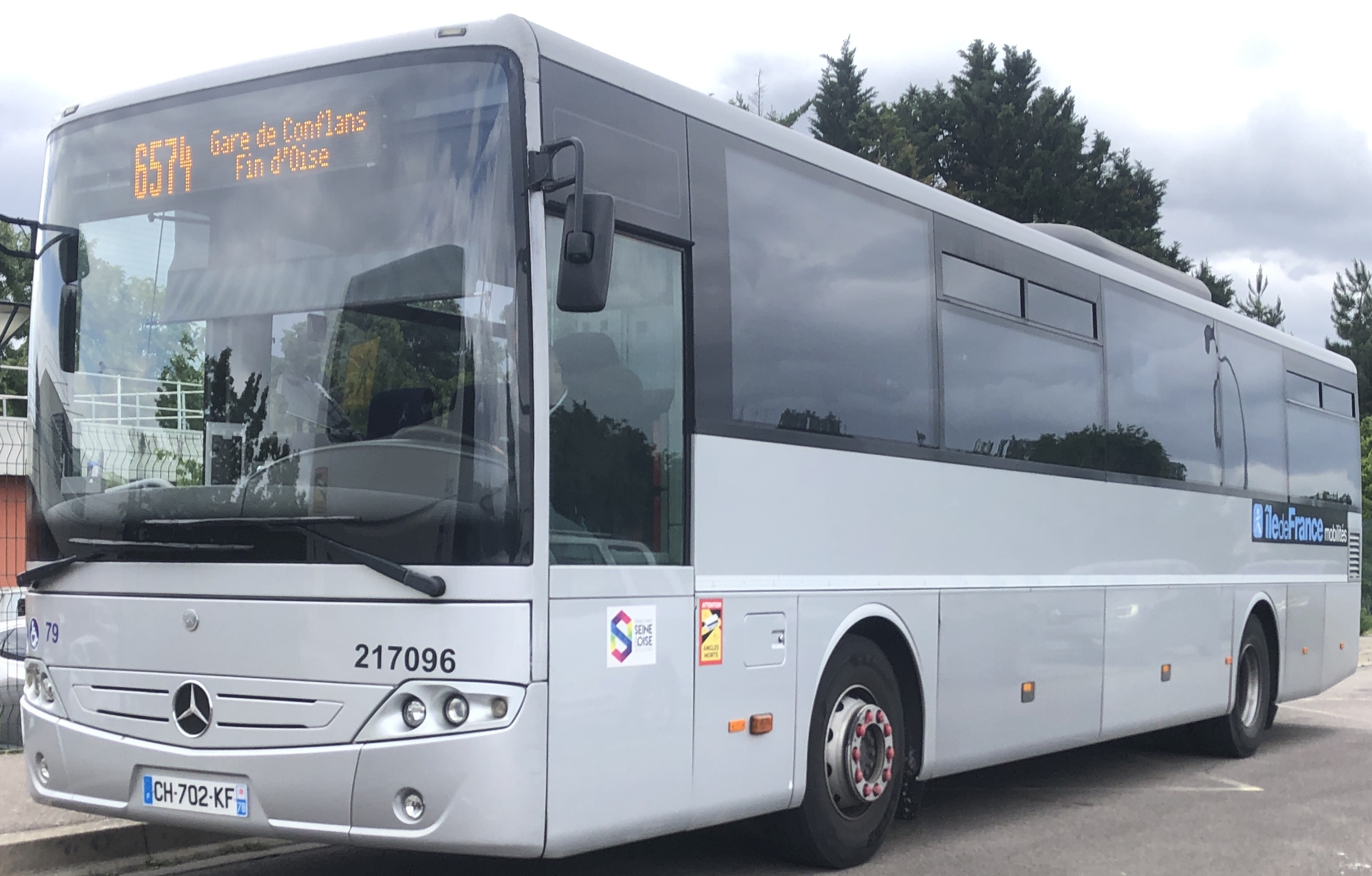
- Mercedes-Benz Intouro II E n°217096 on line 6574 at Collège Saint-Exupéry, Andrésy.
- Parent: Île-de-France Mobilités
- Founded: August 1, 2021
- Service area: Yvelines: (Achères, Aigremont, Andrésy, Aubergenville, Bouafle, Carrières-sous-Poissy, Chambourcy, Chanteloup-les-Vignes, Chapet, Le Chesnay-Rocquencourt, Conflans-Sainte-Honorine, Ecquevilly, Élancourt, Épône, Evecquemont, La Falaise, Flins-sur-Seine, Gaillon-sur-Montcient, Hardricourt, Maurecourt, Médan, Meulan-en-Yvelines, Mézières-sur-Seine, Mézy-sur-Seine, Montigny-le-Bretonneux, Morainvilliers, Les Mureaux, Nézel, Orgeval, Plaisir, Poissy, Puteaux, Saint-Germain-en-Laye, Tessancourt-sur-Aubette, Thiverval-Grignon, Trappes, Triel-sur-Seine, Vaux-sur-Seine, Verneuil-sur-Seine, Vernouillet, Versailles, Villennes-sur-Seine); Val-d'Oise: (Cergy, Condécourt, Jouy-le-Moutier, Sagy, Seraincourt, Vauréal)
- Routes: 6501 6502 6503 6504 6505; 6506 6507 6510 6511 6512; 6513 6514 6515 6516 6517; 6518 6519 6521 6522 6523; 6524 6525 6526 6527 6528; 6529 6531 6532 6533 6534; 6535 6536 6537 6538 6540; 6541 6542 6543 6550 6551; 6552 6553 6554 6555 6556; 6557 6558 6559 6560 6561; 6562 6563 6564 6565 6566; 6567 6568 6569 6570 6571; 6572 6573 6574 6575 6576; 6577 6578 6579 6580 6581; 6582 6590 6591 6592 6593; 6594 6595 7801 7809 7819; 7821 7822
- Operator: Keolis (Keolis Seine et Oise Est)

Poissy – Les Mureaux is a French bus network run by Île-de-France Mobilités and Grand Paris Seine et Oise, operated by Keolis through his subsidiary Keolis Seine et Oise Est from August 1, 2021.

It consists of 81 lines serving the bassins of Poissy and Les Mureaux. The network is also completed with four night lines, a demand-responsive transport and the Noctilien line N155.

== History ==
The first lines appeared during the 1950s with different names of previous networks Poissy Aval, Deux Rives de Seine, Les Mureaux et Val de Seine.

=== Network development ===
==== Development of lines operated by Transdev Autocars Tourneux ====
On January 1, 2009, lines 3, 12, 22, 26, 30, 31, 32, 33, 35, 37 and 39 were transferred to Autocars Tourneux.

On January 4, 2016, a restructuring of the Carrières-sous-Poissy lines was implemented, resulting in the creation of line 1, the implementation of a new route on line 2, and the renaming of the old line 1 under the line 6. A new line linking the different districts of Carrières-sous-Poissy to the Peugeot factory of Poissy was created on the same date under the line 6P.

On January 6, 2017, the urban network of Poissy was modified, the line 53 ceased to exist and the line 50 were restructured due of his service to Peugeot factory of Poissy and renamed line 50P.

==== Development of lines operated by Transdev CSO ====
On January 10, 2011, the line 502 abandons its route between Saint-Quentin-en-Yvelines station and the Renault technocentre of Guyancourt, the route is transferred to new line 466 of the Sqybus network.

On January 4, 2016, the line 12 is limited between Vernouillet-Verneuil station and Cergy-Préfecture station, his school services were transferred to new line 13 between Verneuil-sur-Seine and Achères.

On September 3, 2018, the line 26 is restructured, his school services were transferred to new line 29.

==== Development of lines operated by Transdev Ecquevilly ====
Before the opening of the competition, the lines 2, 5, 12, 18, 19, 13, 21, 32 and 33 were operated by Transdev through their subsidiary Transdev Ecquevilly.

==== Development of Les Mureaux bus network ====
On September 1, 2007, the network of Les Mureaux consisted of five lines, their names were indicated with a color.

On September 1, 2008, the network is restructured with six lines (N1, 2, 3, 4, 5, 6) who commenced their services two weeks later with a partnership with Les Mureaux, the operator Veolia Transport and STIF.

The operating cost of the new network is €2.7 million per year, almost entirely covered by STIF, including €600,000 under its urban policy scheme, with the municipality of Les Mureaux contributing €100,000.

On September 1, 2014, following the opening of Pôle Molière in Les Mureaux. The lines 1, 4, 5 and 6 were restructured and a new line 7 was created.

=== Opening to the competition ===
Due to the opening to the compeititon of public transport in Île-de-France, Poissy – Les Mureaux was founded on August 1, 2021, corresponding to public service delegation number 14 established by Île-de-France Mobilités. A call for tenders was therefore launched by the organizing authority to designate a company that will operate the network for a period of eight years. It was finally Keolis who gain the operation, through his subsidiary Keolis Seine et Oise Est, which was designated during the board of directors on February 11, 2021.

At the time of its opening to the competition, the network consisted of the lines shown in the table below:

List of the lines of Poissy – Les Mureaux
Oldest network	Lines
Autocars Tourneux	1, 2, 3, 12, 22, 26, 29, 30, 31, 32, 33, 35, 37, 39, 502
Bus O'Mureaux	N1, 2, 3, 4, 5, 6, 7
Cars Lacroix	30–27
RATP Dev Stile	A14 Verneuil, A14 Mureaux, 100
Transdev CSO	1, 2, 6, 9, 10, 11, 14, 16, 20, 21, 24, 25, 28, 50, 51, 52, 54, 98
Transdev Ecquevilly	2, 5, 12, 18, 19, 13, 21, 32, 33

On August 1, 2021, the line 18 was restructured in three new lines:

- The line 18 between Les Mureaux and Aubergenville
- The line 28 between Les Mureaux, Maule and Villiers-Saint-Frédéric
- The line 38 between Aubergenville, Maule and Andelu

On August 16, 2022, following its summer service interruption, the line 21 (Aubergenville-Poissy) is restructured in two new lines, 21a and 21b.

On January 2, 2023, a new stop is created to serve the medicalized care home of Bécheville.

==== First renaming ====
On May 9, 2023, the network is being restructured with a first renaming of all lines of the network:

Network renaming
Old	New
2P; 24	1
10; 25; 51; 52	2
50	3
N1; 7M	4
51; 52	5
2M; 5M; 7M	6
3M; 6M	7
98	10
13HE	11
20	12
30	13
31; 32; 37	14; 15
32V; 33VM	16
35	17
39	18
11	19
16	20
2MC	21
5SM	22
18	23
54	24
32M	25
33M	26
1V	27
2VM	28
25	29
1CP	30
6CP	31
28	32
32MY	33
55	34
11	40
12VC	41
3MSG	42
26	43
502	44
24S	50
2CS (school services)	51
10 (school services)	52
25 (school services)	53
50A	54
50B	55
52A	56
50B	57
7 (school services)	58
14	59
311	60
312	61
313	62
29	63
98S	64
3S1	65
3S2	66
26 (school services)	67; 68; 69
21	70
22	71
13VC	72
12AM	73
11 (school services)	74
32V	75
30-27	76
50P	90
14P	91
26P	92
21A	93
6P	94
21B	95
Express 9	X409
Express 19	X419
100; Express A14; Soirée	Unchanged

==== Subsequent changes and integration of the lines operated by the Stile ====
On November 6, 2023, the line 50 was merged into the line 59.

On January 1, 2024, the three lines operated by the Stile were taken over by Keolis Seine et Oise Est and officially integrated into the network, the lines 44 and 100 has been merged into a unique line, Express 100.

On March 3, 2025, the lines 14 and 15 were restructured with new services, abandonning their circular services.

==== Second renaming ====
From August 25, 2025, the lines of Poissy – Les Mureaux were renamed, in accordance with the single regional numbering system planned by Île-de-France Mobilités in order to remove duplicated lines. The new lines will all begin with the prefix "65", followed by the last two digits of the old number, as soon as possible. For Express lines, the number will include the department number (in this case, Yvelines, therefore "78") and the last two digits of the line number.

The correspondence between old and new numbers is as follows:

Network renaming
Old	New
1	6501
2	6502
3	6503
4	6504
5	6505
6	6506
7	6507
10	6510
11	6511
12	6512
13	6513
14	6514
15	6515
30	6516
20	6517
18	6518
19	6519
21	6521
22	6522
23	6523
16	6524
25	6525
26	6526
27	6527
28	6528
29	6529
31	6531
32	6532
33	6533; 6535
34	6534
24	6536
17	6537
40	6540
41	6541
42	6542
43	6543
63	6550; 6563
51	6551
52	6552
53	6553
54	6554
55	6555
56	6556
57	6557
58	6558
59	6559
60	6560
61	6561; 6581
62	6562
64	6564
65	6565
66	6566
67	6567; 6577
68	6568
69	6569
70	6570; 6582
71	6571
72	6572
73	6573; 6580
74	6574
75	6575
76a	6576
76b	6578
76c	6579
90	6590
91	6591
92	6592
93	6593
94	6594
95	6595
100	7801
X409	7809
X419	7819
A14 Les Mureaux	7821
A14 Verneuil	7822

==== Subsequent changes following the restructuring of the network ====
Following the restructuring of the network, some lines are modified:

- The line 33 is split into two separate lines:
  - The line 6533 between "Arquebuse" and "Maison des Associations", at Meulan-en-Yvelines
  - The line 6535 as a circular line of Meulan-en-Yvelines, serving Thun-le-Paradis station
- The line 61 is split into two separate lines:
  - The line 6561 between Vaux-sur-Seine and Les Mureaux (Lycée François Villon)
  - The line 6581 between Mézy-sur-Seine and Les Mureaux (Lycée François Villon)
- The line 63 is split into two separate lines:
  - The line 6550 between Vernouillet (Avenue de Triel) or Verneuil-sur-Seine (Hôtel de Ville) and Poissy (Institut Notre-Dame)
  - The line 6563 between Verneuil-sur-Seine (Allée des Clairières) and Poissy (Institut Notre-Dame)
- The line 67 is split into two separate lines:
  - The line 6567 between Gare des Mureaux and Saint-Germain-en-Laye (Nicot)
  - The line 6577 between Verneuil-sur-Seine (Allée des Clairières) and Saint-Germain-en-Laye (Allée Royale)
- The line 70 is split into two separate routes:
  - The line 6570 between Gare des Mureaux and Gare de Saint-Germain-en-Laye
  - The line 6582 between Morainvilliers and Chambourcy (Collège André Derain)
- The line 73 is split into two separate routes:
  - The line 6573 serving Ecquevilly (Collège Léonard de Vinci)
  - The line 6580 serving Les Mureaux (Lycée François Villon) and Aubergenville (Lycée Van Gogh)
- The lines 76a, 76b and 78c are modified:
  - The line 6576 (formerly 76a) between Menucourt (Pasteur) and Verneuil-sur-Seine (Notre-Dame Chemin Vert)
  - The liine 6578 (formerly 76b) between Vauréal (Les Valanchards) and Verneuil-sur-Seine (Notre-Dame Chemin Vert)
  - The line 6579 (formerly 76c) between Jouy-le-Moutier (Le Noyer) and Verneuil-sur-Seine (Notre-Dame Chemin Vert)

==== Later changes ====
===== 2026 =====
In July 2026, a new line 6538 is created to serve the Île de Loisirs du Val-de-Seine in Verneuil-sur-Seine from Gare des Clairières de Verneuil. However, this line is only running during the summer break.

== Routes ==
=== Main routes ===
Image	Line	First direction	Second direction
	6501	Gare de Saint-Germain-en-Laye	Carrières-sous-Poissy — Maison des Insectes
	6502	Chanteloup-les-Vignes — Les Ouches	Chambourcy — Collège André Derain
	6503	Poissy — Saint-Exupéry	Poissy — La Coudraie; Orgeval — Maison Blanche
	6504	Gare des Mureaux	Les Mureaux — Les Musiciens
	6505	Gare de Poissy	Poissy — La Bruyère
	6506	Les Mureaux — Paul Éluard	Les Mureaux — Nouvelle France
	6507	Les Mureaux — Descartes	Aubergenville — Family Village Shopping; Les Mureaux — FAM de Bécheville
	6510	Gare de Poissy	Gare de Triel-sur-Seine
	6511	Hardricourt — Rue de Verdun	Ecquevilly — Collège Léonard de Vinci
	6512	Gare de Poissy (circular line)	
	6513	Gare de Vernouillet - Verneuil; Vernouillet — Centre Commercial Grosse Pierre	Verneuil-sur-Seine — Piscine
	6514	Gare de Vernouillet - Verneuil	Vernouillet — Collège Émile Zola
	6515	Gare de Vernouillet - Verneuil	Vernouillet — Collège Émile Zola
	6516	Gare de Poissy	Carrières-sous-Poissy — Les Oiseaux
	6517	Gare de Conflans-Fin-d'Oise (circular line)	
	6518	Gare de Vernouillet - Verneuil (circular line)	
	6519	Gare de Conflans-Fin-d'Oise (circular line)	
	6521	Gare des Mureaux	Gare de Cergy-le-Haut
	6522	Gare des Mureaux; Les Mureaux — Lycée François Villon	Gaillon-sur-Montcient — Mairie; Seraincourt — Rue de l'Aulnaie
	6523	Gare des Mureaux	Nézel — D113; Meulan-en-Yvelines — Arquebuse; Mézières-sur-Seine — Libération
	6524	Gare de Vernouillet - Verneuil; Verneuil-sur-Seine — Notre-Dame Chemin Vert	Morainvilliers — Épinettes
	6525	Gare des Mureaux (circular line)	
	6526	Gare des Mureaux	Gare de Meulan - Hardricourt
	6527	Gare de Villennes-sur-Seine (circular line)	
	6528	Gare de Villennes-sur-Seine (circular line)	
	6529	Gare de Poissy	Chanteloup-les-Vignes — Hautes Garennes
	6531	Carrières-sous-Poissy — Ronceray (circular line)	
	6532	Gare de Chanteloup-les-Vignes (circular line)	
	6533	Meulan-en-Yvelines — Arquebuse (circular line)	
	6534	Gare de Poissy (circular line)	
	6535	Gare de Thun-le-Paradis (circular line)	
	6536	Gare de Poissy (circular line)	
	6537	Gare des Clairières de Verneuil (circular line)	
	6538	Gare des Clairières de Verneuil	Verneuil-sur-Seine — Île de Loisirs du Val-de-Seine
	6540	Gare de Poissy	Gare de Conflans-Fin-d'Oise
	6541	Gare de Vernouillet - Verneuil	Gare de Cergy-Préfecture
	6542	Gare de Poissy; Gare de Saint-Germain-en-Laye	Meulan-en-Yvelines — Arquebuse
	6543	Gare des Mureaux	Gare de Poissy
	6550	Poissy — Institution Notre-Dame; Poissy — Lycée Le Corbusier	Vernouillet — Avenue de Triel
	6551	Poissy — Lycée Le Corbusier	Carrières-sous-Poissy — Les Fleurs; Carrières-sous-Poissy — Frères Tissier
	6552	Poissy — Lycée Le Corbusier	Carrières-sous-Poissy — Pont Neuf
	6553	Poissy — Lycée Le Corbusier	Triel-sur-Seine — La Chapelle
	6554	Poissy — Collège Les Grands Champs	Poissy — La Coudraie
	6555	Poissy — Lycée Le Corbusier	Poissy — Saint-Exupéry
	6556	Poissy — Lycée Le Corbusier	Poissy — Rond-Point de l'Île
	6557	Poissy — Lycée Le Corbusier	Poissy — La Bruyère
	6558	Les Mureaux — Lycée François Villon	Gare des Mureaux
	6559	Saint-Germain-en-Laye — Nicot	Gare de Cergy-Saint-Christophe
	6560	Meulan-en-Yvelines — Collège Henri IV	Gare des Mureaux
	6561	Les Mureaux — Lycée François Villon	Vaux-sur-Seine — Port Maron; Vaux-sur-Seine — Le Lion Vert
	6562	Les Mureaux — Lycée François Villon	Gare de Vaux-sur-Seine; Vaux-sur-Seine — Port Maron; Tessancourt-sur-Aubette — Mairie
	6563	Poissy — Institution Notre-Dame; Poissy — Lycée Le Corbusier	Verneuil-sur-Seine — Allée des Clairières
	6564	Triel-sur-Seine — Collège Les Châtelaines	Gare de Vaux-sur-Seine
	6565	Poissy — Lycée Le Corbusier	Meulan-en-Yvelines — Arquebuse
	6566	Verneuil-sur-Seine — Collège Jean Zay; Verneuil-sur-Seine — Notre-Dame Chemin Vert	Triel-sur-Seine — Senet
	6567	Saint-Germain-en-Laye — Nicot	Gare des Mureaux
	6568	Poissy — Lycée Le Corbusier	Gare des Mureaux
	6569	Verneuil-sur-Seine — Notre-Dame Chemin Vert	Gare de Poissy
	6570	Gare de Saint-Germain-en-Laye; Saint-Germain-en-Laye — Nicot	Gare des Mureaux
	6571	Gare de Poissy	Ecquevilly — Les Sablons; Ecquevilly — Clos des Bois
	6572	Gare de Conflans-Fin-d'Oise; Achères — Lycée Louise Weiss	Gare de Vernouillet - Verneuil; Verneuil-sur-Seine — Notre-Dame Chemin Vert
	6573	Ecquevilly — Collège Léonard de Vinci	Aubergenville — Bois Bodin Centre Commercial; Bouafle — Le Beauce; Chapet — Le Petit Moulin
	6574	Andrésy — Collège Saint-Exupery	Gare de Conflans-Fin-d'Oise
	6575	Gare de Vernouillet - Verneuil (circular line)	
	6576	Verneuil-sur-Seine — Notre-Dame Chemin Vert	Menucourt — Pasteur; Menucourt — Bas Rucourt; Vaux-sur-Seine — Cimetière
	6577	Gare de Saint-Germain-en-Laye; Saint-Germain-en-Laye — Place Royale	Verneuil-sur-Seine — Allée des Clairières
	6578	Verneuil-sur-Seine — Notre-Dame Chemin Vert	Vauréal — Les Valanchards
	6579	Verneuil-sur-Seine — Notre-Dame Chemin Vert	Jouy-le-Moutier — Le Noyer; Jouy-le-Moutier — Gabriel Fauré
	6580	Aubergenville — Lycée Van Gogh; Les Mureaux — Lycée François Villon	Chapet — Le Petit Moulin; Chapet — Mairie; Les Mureaux — Comtesse RD43
	6581	Les Mureaux — Lycée François Villon	Mézy-sur-Seine — Place du Tilleul; Mézy-sur-Seine — Mairie
	6582	Chambourcy — Collège André Derain	Morainvilliers — Église; Orgeval — Four à Chaux; Orgeval — Auberge sans nom
	6590	Poissy — Stellantis	Poissy — La Coudraie
	6591	Poissy — Stellantis	Cergy — Martelet
	6592	Poissy — Stellantis	Gare des Mureaux
	6593	Poissy — Stellantis	Gare d'Aubergenville-Élisabethville
	6594	Poissy — Stellantis	Carrières-sous-Poissy — Pont Neuf
	6595	Poissy — Stellantis	Ecquevilly — Clos des Bois
	7801	Gare de Saint-Quentin-en-Yvelines	Gare des Mureaux
	7809	Gare de Poissy	Versailles — Europe
	7819	Gare des Mureaux; Les Mureaux — Aérospatiale	Versailles — Europe
	7821	Gare des Mureaux	La Défense — Terminal Jules Verne
	7822	Gare de Vernouillet - Verneuil	La Défense — Terminal Jules Verne

=== Noctilien ===
From January 2, 2023, the Noctilien line N155 is operated by Keolis through their subsidiary Keolis Seine et Oise Est, and integrated to the network.

Image	Line	First direction	Second direction
	N155	Paris-Saint-Lazare	Gare de Poissy

=== Night routes ===
The network is also completed with four night lines named Soirée Carrières-sous-Poissy, Soirée Les Mureaux, Soirée Poissy and Soirée Vernouillet-Verneuil.

Image	Line
	Soirée Carrières-sous-Poissy
	Soirée Les Mureaux
	Soirée Poissy
	Soirée Vernouillet-Verneuil

=== Demand-responsive transport ===
The network also operates a demand-responsive transport named TàD Meulan - Les Mureaux.

Image	Line
	TàD Meulan - Les Mureaux

== Gallery ==
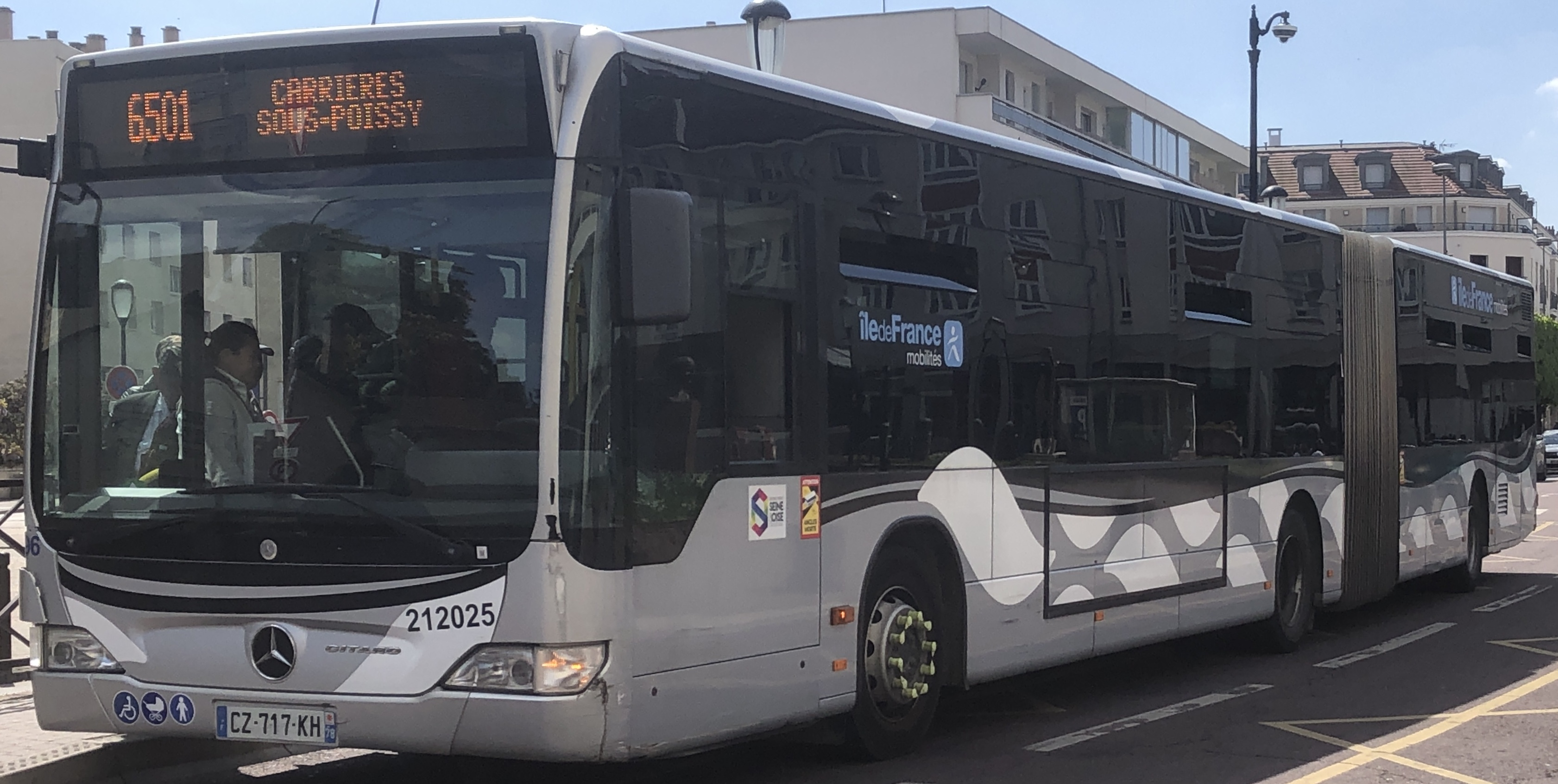
Mercedes-Benz Citaro G Facelift n°212025 on line 6501, at Gare de Poissy.

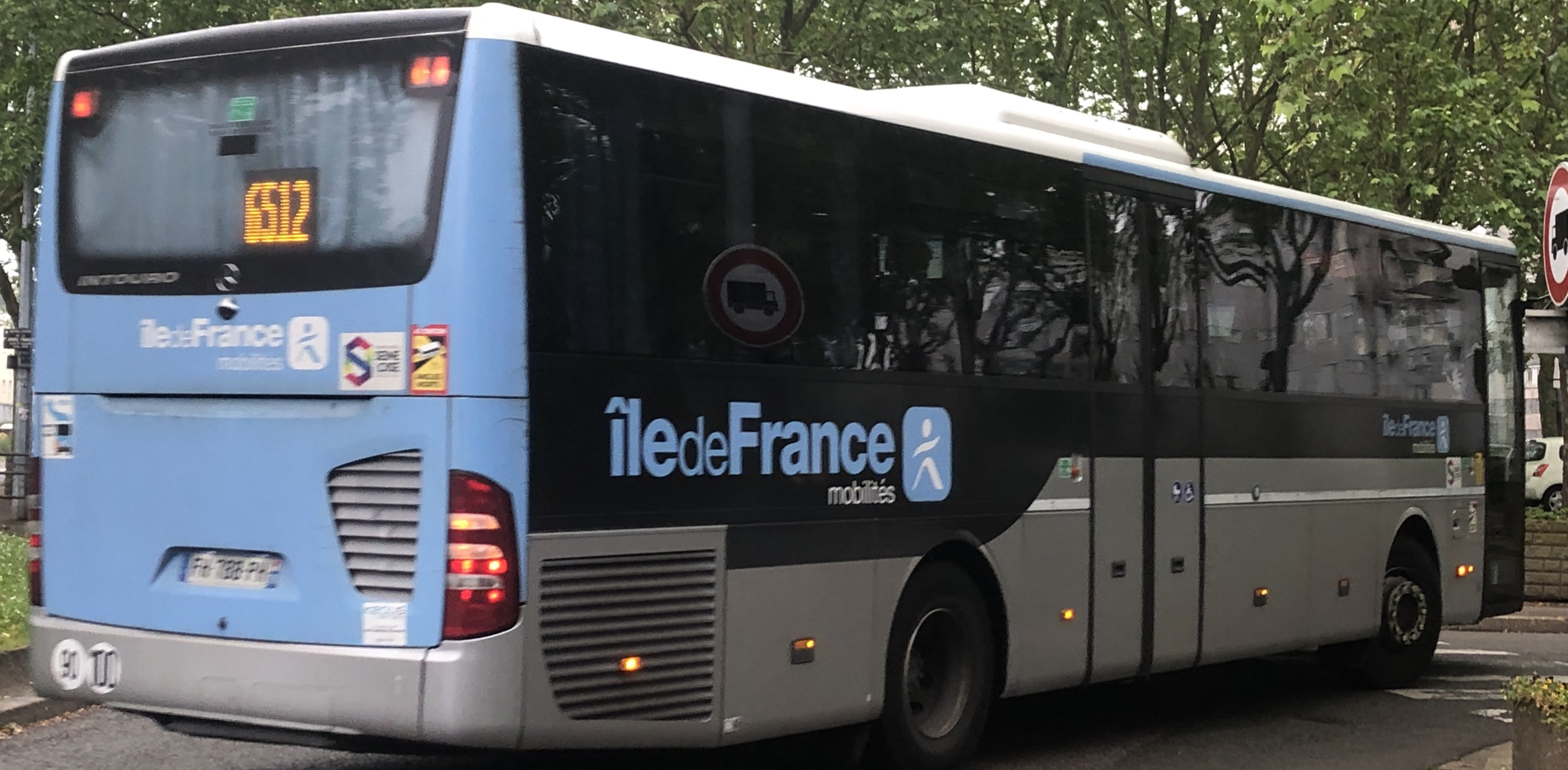
Mercedes-Benz Intouro II n°217135 on line 6512, in Poissy.

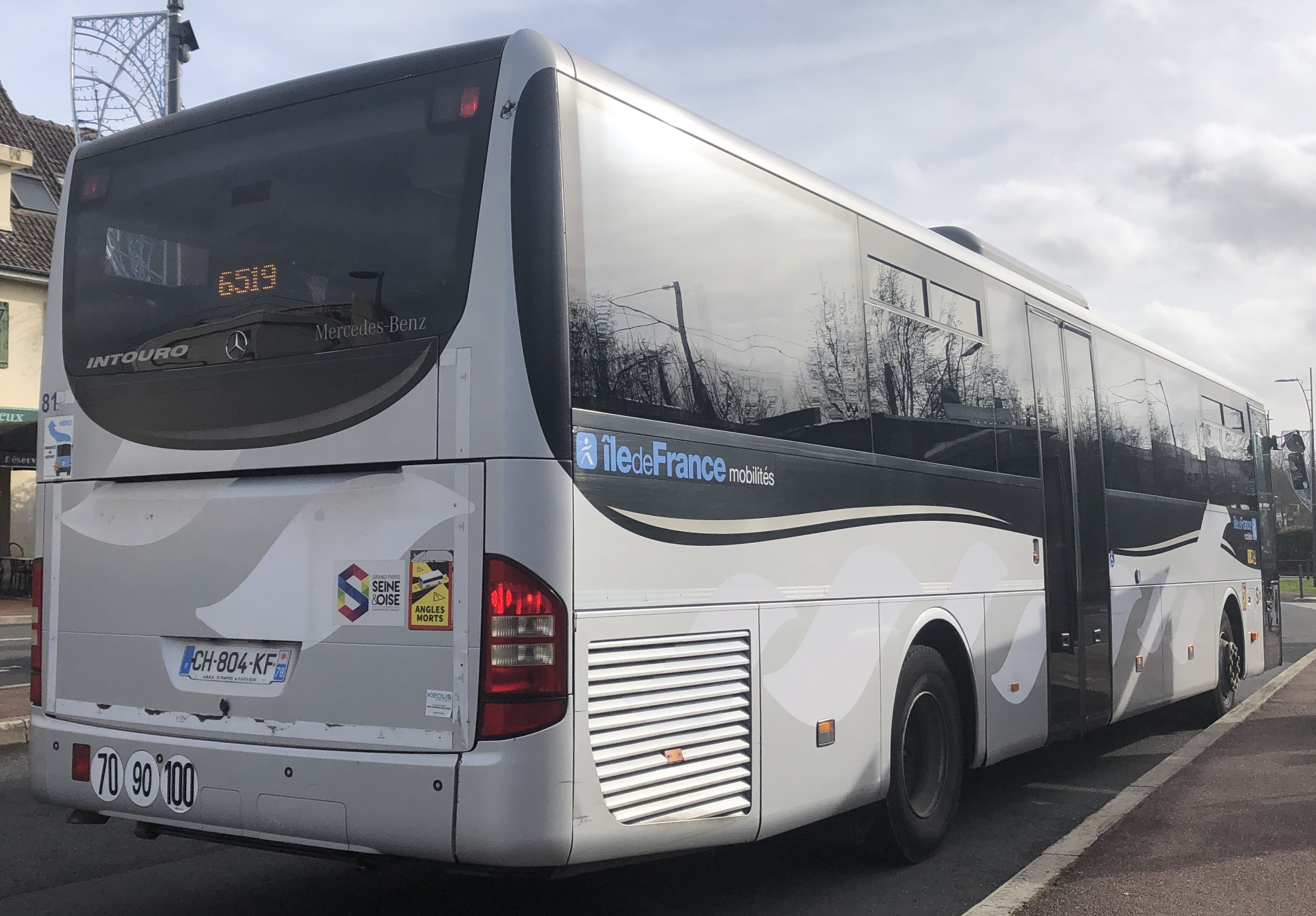
Mercedes-Benz Intouro II ME n°217098 on line 6519, at Gare de Conflans-Fin-d'Oise, in Conflans-Sainte-Honorine.

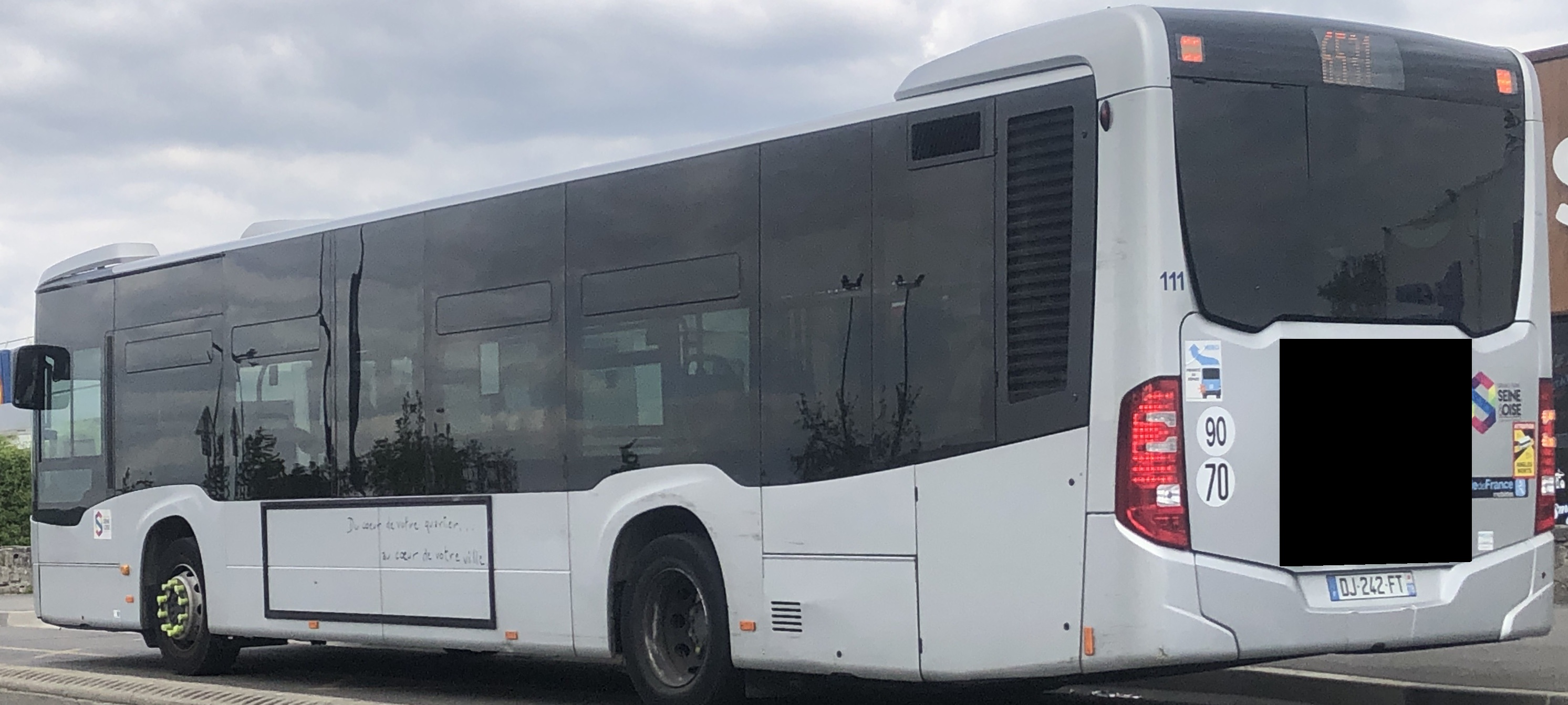
Mercedes-Benz Citaro C2 n°211241 on line 6531, at Ronceray, in Carrières-sous-Poissy.

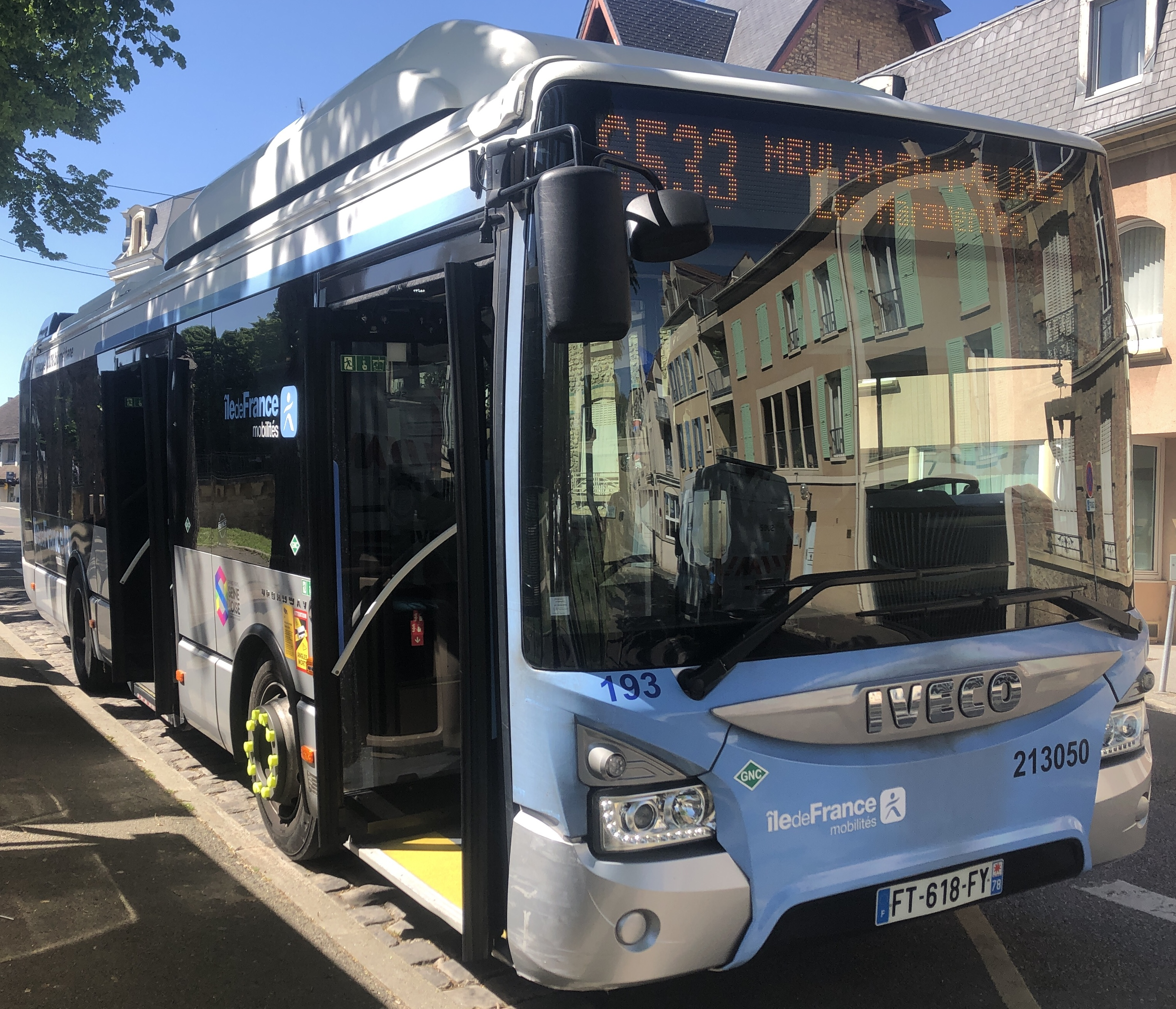
Iveco Urbanway 10 GNV n°213050 on line 6533, at Arquebruse, in Meulan-en-Yvelines.

== See also ==
- Île-de-France Mobilités
- Grand Paris Seine et Oise
