= Aubergenville-Élisabethville station =

Railway station in Aubergenville, France

Aubergenville-Élisabethville
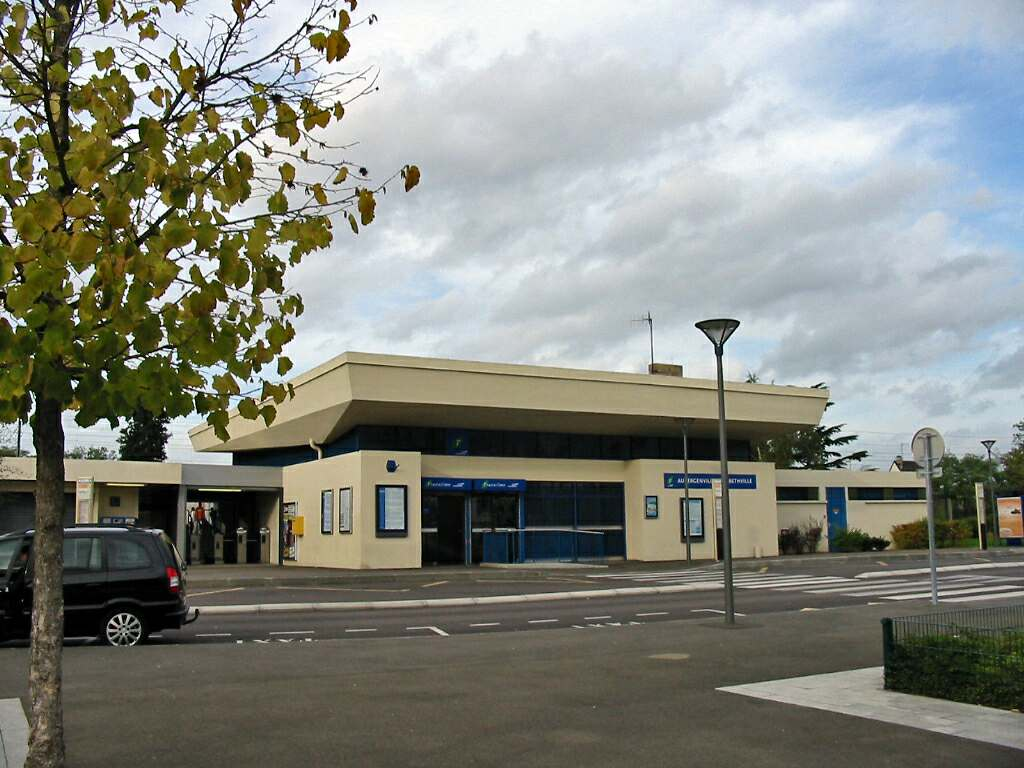

General information
- Location: Rue de la Gare; 78410 Aubergenville; France
- Coordinates: 48°58′19″N 1°50′54″E
- Owner: SNCF
- Operator: SNCF
- Platforms: 2
- Tracks: 3

Construction
- Accessible: Yes, by prior reservation

Other information
- Station code: 87386730
- Fare zone: 5

History
- Opened: 1891

Passengers
- 2023: 1,683,413

Services
Preceding station	Transilien	Following station
Les Mureaux towards Paris-St.-Lazare	Line J	Épône–Mézières towards Ermont–Eaubonne, Gisors, Mantes-la-Jolie or Vernon
Location

Aubergenville-Élisabethville is a French rail station of the Paris-Saint-Lazare–Le Havre line located in Aubergenville, in the departement of the Yvelines, in Île-de-France.

The station is operated by the SNCF (Société nationale des chemins de fer français) and served by trains of the Transilien Line J.

== Location ==
The station is established at an altitude of 25 meters, and located at kilometric point (PK) 45.585 of Paris–Le Havre line, between the stations Épône - Mézières and Les Mureaux.

== History ==
=== Halt of Aubergenville ===
The halt of Aubergenville opened in 1891 by the Compagnie des chemins de fer de l'Ouest.

On July 1, 1893, the halt was opened to "passengers, luggages, courier items, high-speed freights and dogs to or from all points on the network".

On July 1, 1897, the stop was opened to "slow-speed freights shipped by full wagonload, handled in the open and overhanging sections by the trade".

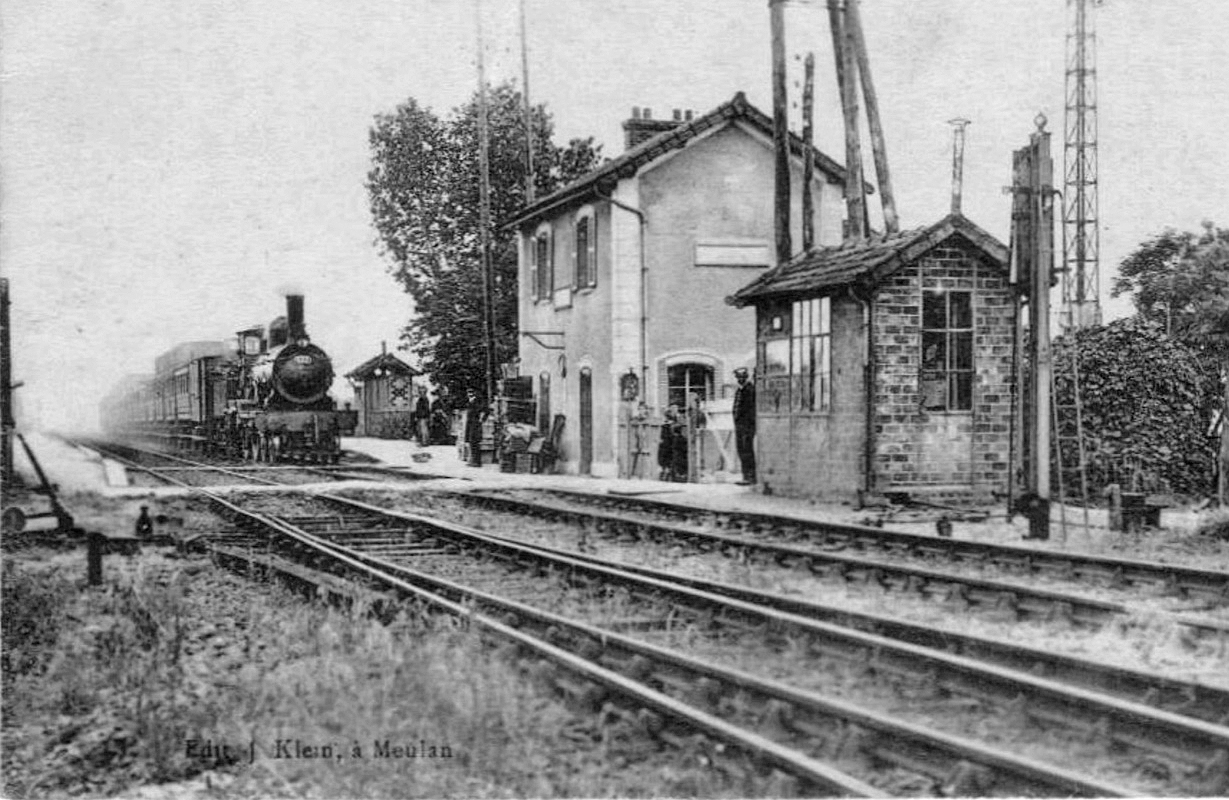
The station in 1920

In 1921, the golden-city of Élisabethville was founded.

On December 14, 1929, the Aubergenville municipal council deliberated on a request for authorization to borrow 14,500 French francs to pay a subsidy to the Administration des chemins de fer de l'État for the installation of electric lighting at the halt. A decree from the President of the Republic on November 22, 1930, authorized this operation and specified the terms.

=== Train station ===
In an unknown date, the halt of Aubergenville was transformed into a train station and renamed Aubergenville-Élisabethville, this change is due to the development of the Élisabethville district and associated tourist activities.

In 1935, the Administration des chemins de fer de l'État put on sale "special return tickets at very reduced prices" for Sundays and holidays; in this context, one could notably travel for 10 francs return, in 3rd class, from the Paris-Saint-Lazare station to the "Aubergenville-Élisabethville station" and vice versa.

From 1950 to 1952, the Renault site of Flins was built nearby the station.

In 1968, many plans scheduled to expand the station.

== Attendance ==
From 2015 to 2023, according to SNCF estimates, the annual passenger traffic at the station amounted to the figures indicated in the table below:

Year	2015	2016	2017	2018	2019	2020	2021	2022	2023
Passengers	1,502,962	1,612,926	1,723,706	1,801,226	1,900,062	988,132	1,266,548	1,580,464	1,683,413

== Service ==
=== Train service ===
The station is served by trains of the Transilien Line J.

=== Connections ===
The station is served by the following bus lines:

- Centre et Sud Yvelines: 5328
- Mantois: 5410, 5411, 5442, 5443
- Poissy - Les Mureaux: 6593

== Future ==
=== Extension of the RER E ===
In 2028 or 2029, the station is scheduled to be connected with the RER E due of his extension to Mantes-la-Jolie, replacing the branch Paris-Saint-Lazare – Mantes-la-Jolie (via Poissy).

== Bibliography ==
- Dominique Hervier; Hélène Bocard; Jean-François Belhoste; Claire Étienne (2005). Inventaire général du patrimoine culturel de la France, régions Île-de-France et Haute-Normandie - De Paris à la mer, la ligne de chemin de fer Paris-Rouen-Le Havre. Paris: Association pour le patrimoine d'Île-de-France (APPIF). p. 152. ISBN 2-905913-46-0.

== See also ==
- List of Transilien stations
