= Meulan–Hardricourt station =

Railway station in Hardricourt, France

Meulan–Hardricourt
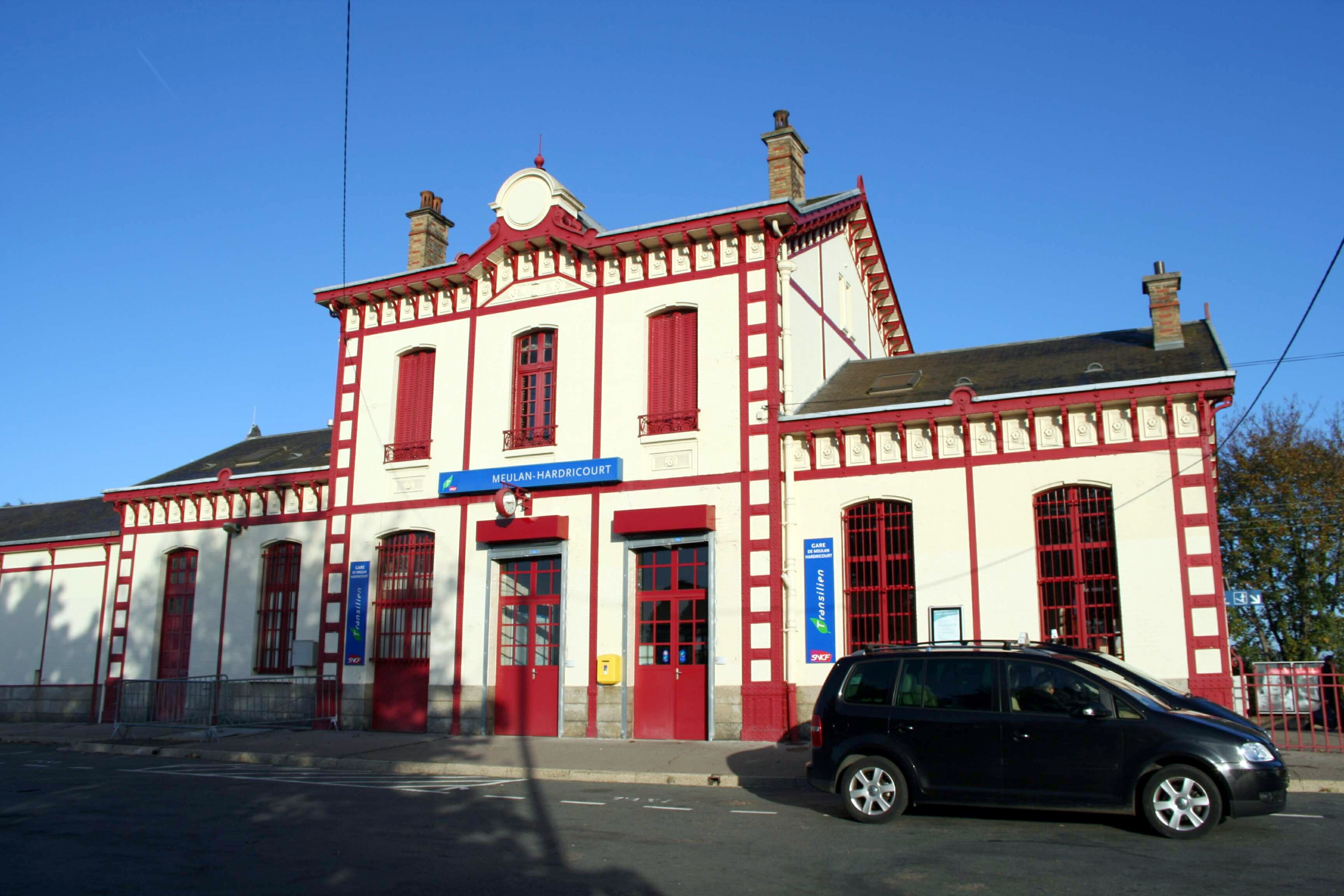
- Entrance of the station

General information
- Location: Avenue de la Gare; 78250 Hardricourt; France
- Coordinates: 49°00′20″N 1°54′07″E
- Owner: SNCF
- Operator: SNCF
- Platforms: 2 platforms
- Tracks: 2

Construction
- Accessible: Yes, by prior reservation

Other information
- Station code: 87381830
- Fare zone: 5

History
- Opened: 1 June 1892

Passengers
- 2023: 740,572

Services
Preceding station	Transilien	Following station
Thun-le-Paradis towards Paris-St.-Lazare	Line J	Juziers towards Ermont–Eaubonne, Gisors, Mantes-la-Jolie or Vernon
Location

Meulan–Hardricourt is a French rail station of the Paris-Saint-Lazare–Mantes-Station line (via Conflans-Sainte-Honorine) located in Hardricourt, in the departement of the Yvelines, in Île-de-France.

The station is operated by the SNCF (Société nationale des chemins de fer français) and served by trains from the Transilien Line J.

== Location ==
The station is at kilometric point (PK) 42.156 of Paris–Mantes-Station line (via Conflans-Sainte-Honorine).

== History ==
The station opened on June 1, 1892.

On March 27, 1967, the line was electrified end-to-end at 25 kV–50 Hz.

== Station ==
Due to the nature of the soil—unconsolidated, alluvium approximately ten meters thick, the station building has a distinctive style. The framework is wrought iron with brick infill, and the building rests on 12-meter-high masonry pillars and arches. Between the building and the stone foundations is a metal lattice on which the structure rests, which can be raised by means of jacks in case of ground settlement. This design had already been successfully employed during the construction of the Saint-Étienne-Châteaucreux station between 1882 and 1884. In Meulan, the height of the foundations exceeds that of the rest of the building.

It has been repainted red, like many other shelters along the line.

== Attendance ==
From 2015 to 2023, according to SNCF estimates, the annual passenger traffic at the station amounted to the figures indicated in the table below:

Year	2015	2016	2017	2018	2019	2020	2021	2022	2023
Passengers	464,652	452,944	488,974	515,702	544,247	279,314	608,191	734,198	740,542

== Service ==
=== Train service ===
The station is served by trains of the Transilien Line J.

=== Connections ===
The station is served by the following bus lines:

- Lignes Île-de-France: 7808
- Mantois: 5409, 5437, 5441, 5447
- Poissy - Les Mureaux: 6511 6521 6522 6526 6581

== See also ==
- List of Transilien stations
