= Vaux-sur-Seine station =

Railway station in Vaux-sur-Seine, France

Vaux-sur-Seine
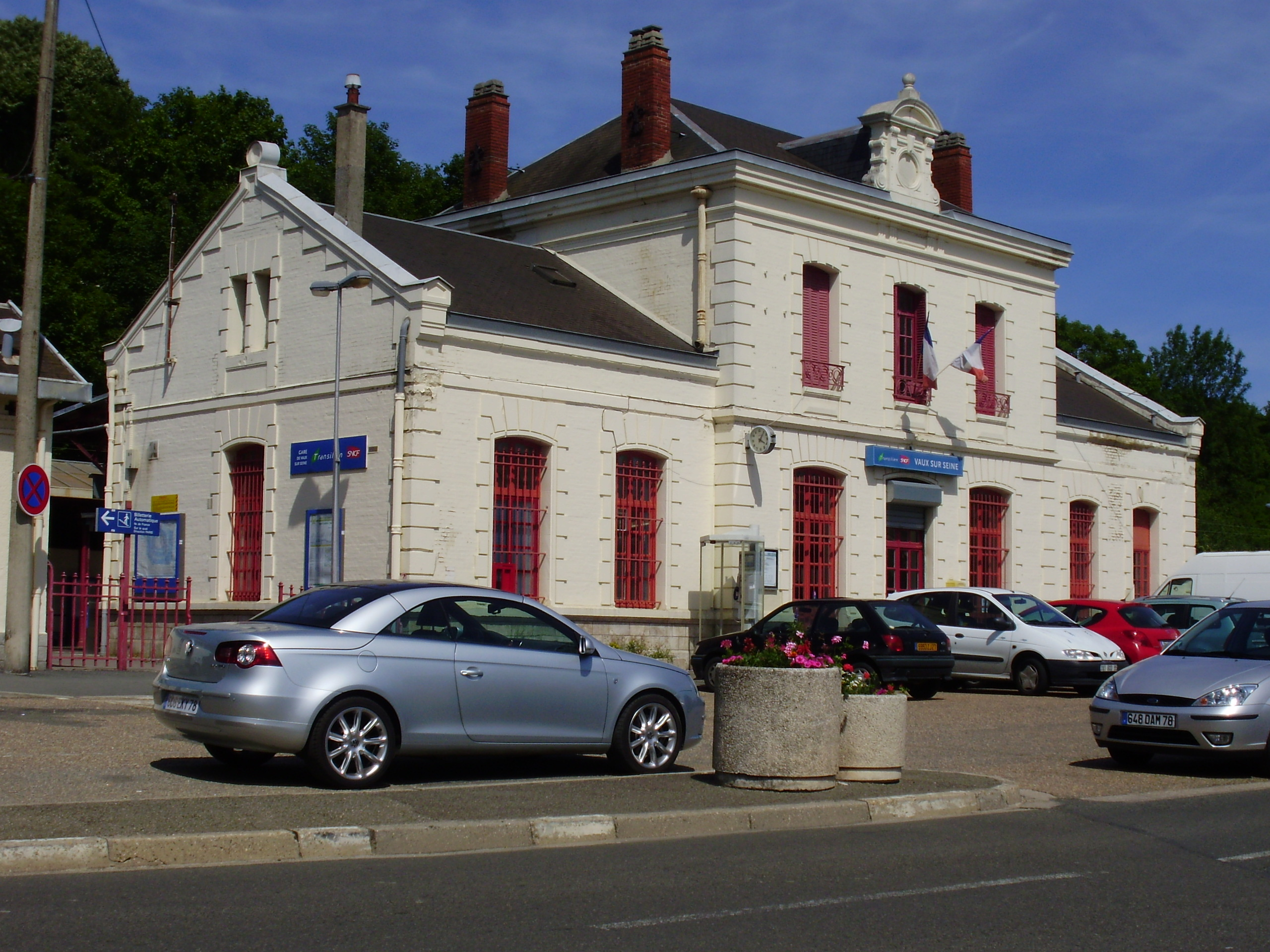
- Entrance to the station

General information
- Location: Avenue de la Gare; 78740 Vaux-sur-Seine; France
- Coordinates: 49°00′25″N 1°57′48″E
- Owner: SNCF
- Operator: SNCF
- Platforms: 2 platforms
- Tracks: 2

Construction
- Accessible: Yes, by prior reservation

Other information
- Station code: 87381814
- Fare zone: 5

History
- Opened: 1 June 1892

Passengers
- 2023: 431,154

Services
Preceding station	Transilien	Following station
Triel-sur-Seine towards Paris-St.-Lazare	Line J	Thun-le-Paradis towards Ermont–Eaubonne, Gisors, Mantes-la-Jolie or Vernon
Location

Vaux-sur-Seine is a French rail station of the Paris-Saint-Lazare–Mantes-Station line (via Conflans-Sainte-Honorine) located in Vaux-sur-Seine, in the departement of the Yvelines, in Île-de-France.

The station is operated by the SNCF (Société nationale des chemins de fer français) and served by trains of the Transilien Line J.

== Location ==
The station is established at an altitude of 42 meters and located at kilometric point (PK) 37.550 of Paris–Mantes-Station line (via Conflans-Sainte-Honorine).

== History ==
The station opened on June 1, 1892.

== Attendance ==
From 2015 to 2023, according to SNCF estimates, the annual passenger traffic at the station amounted to the figures indicated in the table below:

Year	2015	2016	2017	2018	2019	2020	2021	2022	2023
Passengers	371,139	385,904	353,446	317,047	286,181	154,770	359,744	419,617	431,154

== Service ==
=== Train service ===
The station is served by trains of the Transilien Line J.

=== Connections ===
The station is served by the following bus lines:

- Poissy - Les Mureaux: 6560 6562 6564 6576

== See also ==
- List of Transilien stations
