= Vernouillet–Verneuil station =

Railway station in Verneuil-sur-Seine, France

Vernouillet - Verneuil
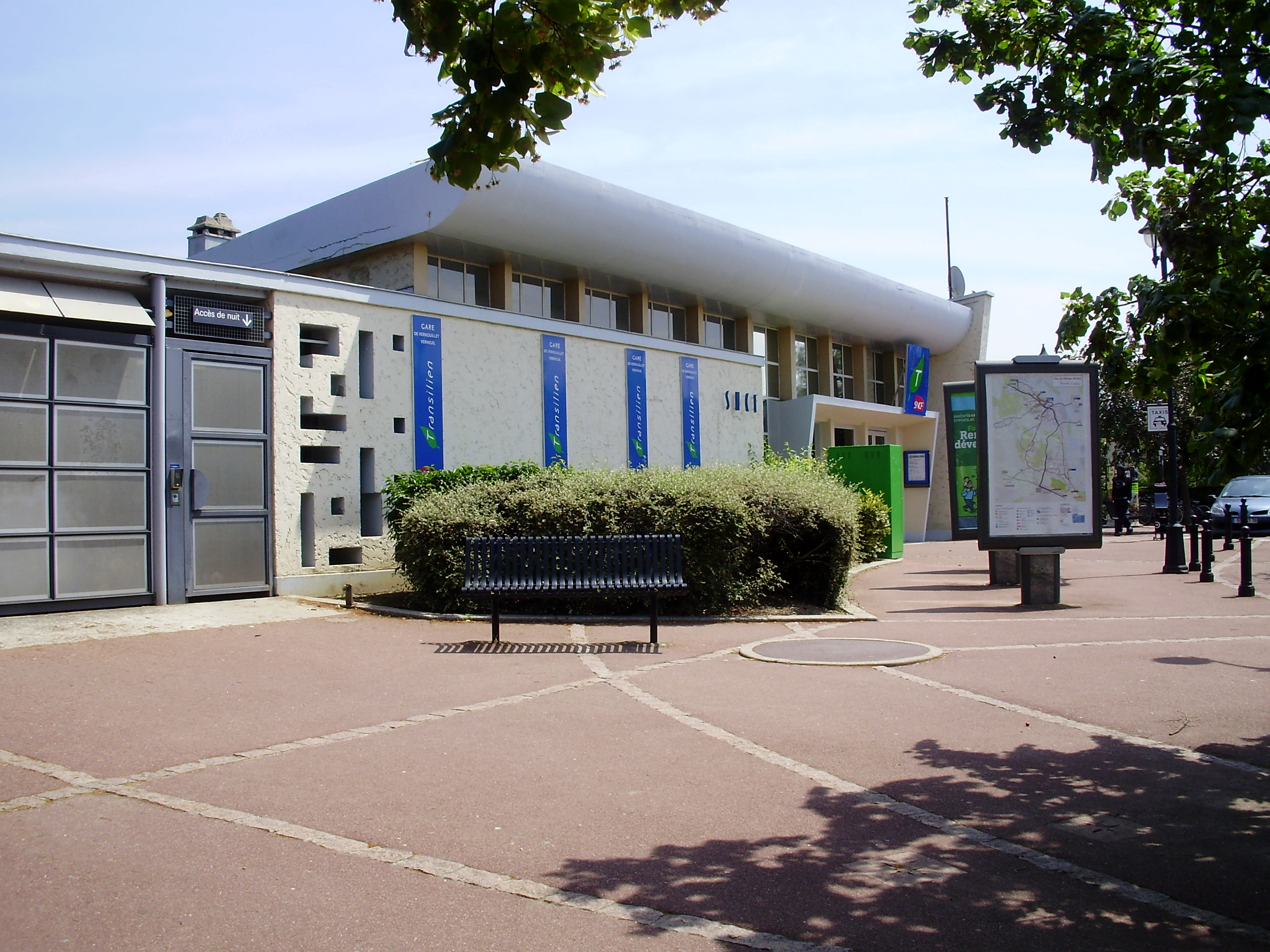
- Entrance of the station

General information
- Location: Place Charles-de-Gaulle; 78480 Verneuil-sur-Seine; France
- Coordinates: 48°58′53″N 1°58′58″E
- Owner: SNCF
- Operator: SNCF
- Platforms: 3 platforms
- Tracks: 4

Construction
- Accessible: Yes, by prior reservation

Other information
- Station code: 87386656
- Fare zone: 5

History
- Opened: 1843

Passengers
- 2023: 2,811,279

Services
Preceding station	Transilien	Following station
Villennes-sur-Seine towards Paris-St.-Lazare	Line J	Les Clairières de Verneuil towards Ermont–Eaubonne, Gisors, Mantes-la-Jolie or Vernon
Location

Vernouillet–Verneuil is a French rail station of the Paris-Saint-Lazare–Le Havre line located in Verneuil-sur-Seine, in the departement of the Yvelines, in Île-de-France.

The station is operated by the SNCF (Société nationale des chemins de fer français) and served by trains of the Transilien Line J.

== Location ==
The station is established at an altitude of 24 meters, and located at kilometric point (PK) 34.623 of Paris–Le Havre line, between the stations Les Clairières de Verneuil and Villennes-sur-Seine.

== Attendance ==
From 2015 to 2023, according to SNCF estimates, the annual passenger traffic at the station amounted to the figures indicated in the table below:

Year	2015	2016	2017	2018	2019	2020	2021	2022	2023
Passengers	2,613,809	2,656,414	2,684,922	2,666,461	2,651,189	1,192,386	2,116,733	2,641,905	2,811,279

== Service ==
=== Train service ===
The station is served by trains of the Transilien Line J.

=== Connections ===
The station is served by the following bus lines:

- Poissy - Les Mureaux: 6513 6514 6515 6518 6524 6541 6543 6567 6568 6572 6575 6577 6592 7822
- Noctilien: N151

== Projects ==
=== Extension of the RER E ===
In 2028 or 2029, the station is scheduled to be connected with the RER E due to the extension to Mantes-la-Jolie, replacing the branch Paris-Saint-Lazare – Mantes-la-Jolie (via Poissy).

== Nearby ==
- École Notre-Dame les Oiseaux

== See also ==
- List of Transilien stations
