= Les Mureaux station =

French railway station

Les Mureaux

General information
- Location: Place du 8-Mai-1945; 78130 Les Mureaux; Les Mureaux, Yvelines, Île-de-France; France
- Coordinates: 48°59′33″N 1°54′48″E
- Line: Paris–Le Havre railway
- Platforms: 2 central platforms
- Tracks: 3

Other information
- Station code: 87386680
- Fare zone: 4

History
- Opened: 9 May 1843; 183 years ago

Passengers
- 2024: 5,383,889

Services
| Preceding station | Transilien | Following station |
|---|---|---|
| Les Clairières de Verneuil towards Paris-St.-Lazare | Line J | Aubergenville-Élisabethville towards Mantes-la-Jolie or Vernon |
Location

Les Mureaux is a railway station in Les Mureaux, in the department of Yvelines, France. It is served by trains of the Transilien Line J.

== Location ==
The station is established at an altitude of 28 meters and situated at kilometric point 40.289 of the Paris-Saint-Lazare–Le Havre line, between Les Clairières de Verneuil and Aubergenville–Élisabethville stations.

== History ==
Les Mureaux (Meulan) is a station from company Compagnies de chemin de fer de Paris à Rouen, opened on May 9, 1843.

The station is transferred along with the line to Compagnie des chemins de fer de l'Ouest (1855–1909), and later to Administration des chemins de fer de l'État (1909–1938), before being transferred to the SNCF.

The station was also connected with the Bouafle–Meulan line, operated by the Compagnie des Chemins de Fer de Grande Banlieue (1912–1948).

== Attendance ==
From 2015 to 2023, according to SNCF estimates, the annual passenger traffic at the station amounted to the figures indicated in the table below:

| Year | 2015 | 2016 | 2017 | 2018 | 2019 | 2020 | 2021 | 2022 | 2023 |
|---|---|---|---|---|---|---|---|---|---|
| Passengers | 3,943,190 | 4,054,618 | 4,152,039 | 4,169,211 | 4,212,499 | 1,739,778 | 3,678,320 | 4,588,884 | 4,883,031 |

== Service ==
The station is served by trains from the Transilien Line J (Transilien Paris-Saint-Lazare), It serves as the origin (PILA missions) during the morning peak hours, and (LOLA missions) during the evening peak hours for some trains going to or coming from Paris-Saint-Lazare.

== Connections ==
The station is served by the following bus lines:

- Lignes Île-de-France Ouest bus network: 7808
- Centre et Sud Yvelines: 5237, 5328, 5341
- Mantois: 5441, 5447
- Poissy - Les Mureaux: 6504 6506 6507 6511 6521 6522 6523 6525 6526 6543 6558 6560 6561 6562 6566 6567 6568 6570 6577
  6581 6592 6593 7801 7819 7821

== Projects ==
=== Extension of the RER E ===
In 2028 or 2029, the station is scheduled to be connected with the RER E due to the extension to Mantes-la-Jolie, replacing the branch Paris-Saint-Lazare – Mantes-la-Jolie (via Poissy).
