= Chanteloup-les-Vignes station =

Railway station in Chanteloup-les-Vignes, France

Chanteloup-les-Vignes
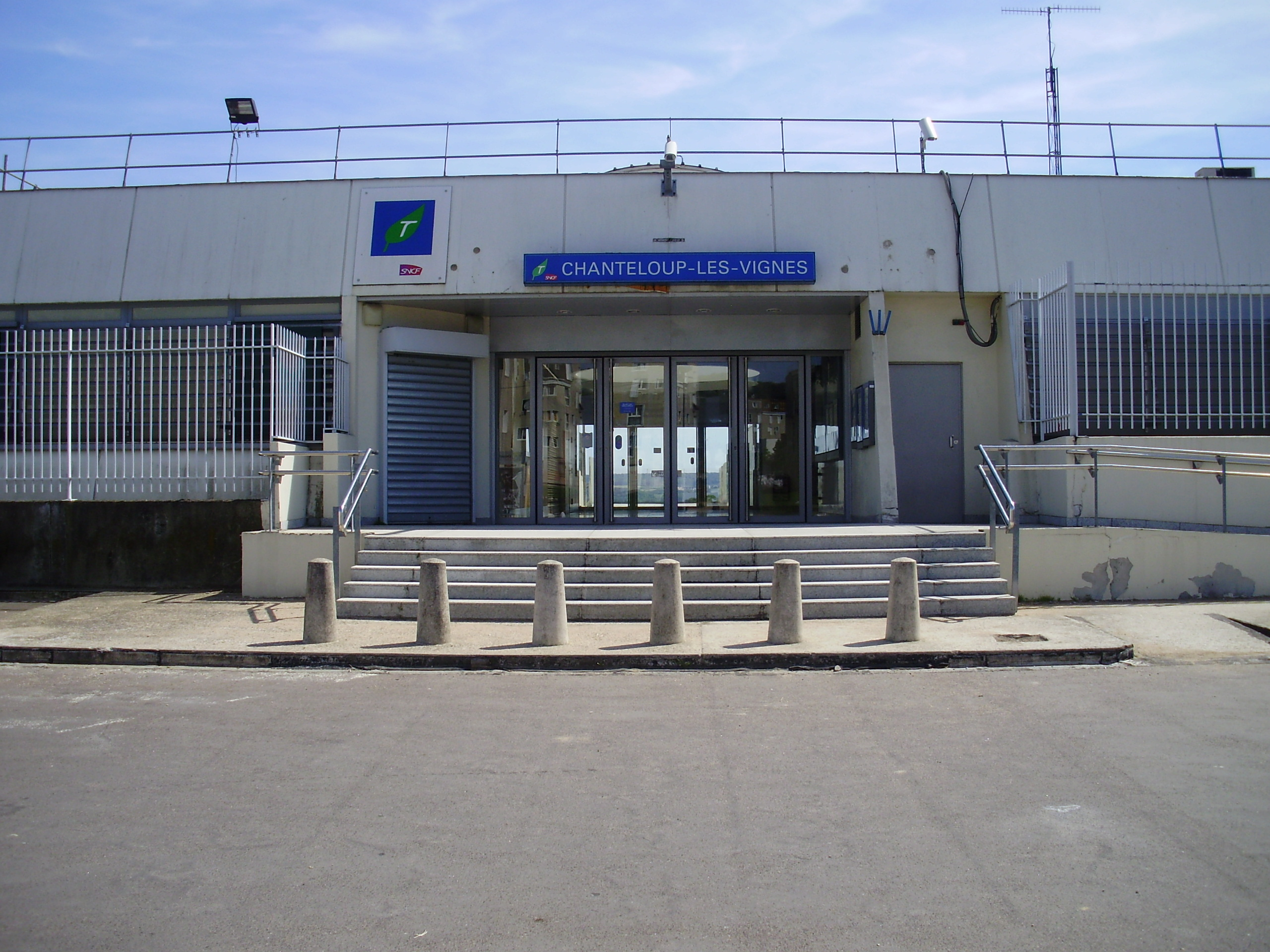
- Entrance to Chanteloup-les-Vignes station

General information
- Location: Avenue Charles-de-Gaulle; 78570 Chanteloup-les-Vignes; France
- Coordinates: 48°58′13″N 2°01′39″E
- Owner: SNCF
- Operator: SNCF
- Platforms: 2 platforms
- Tracks: 2

Construction
- Accessible: Yes, by prior reservation

Other information
- Station code: 87381475
- Fare zone: 5

History
- Opened: 1 June 1892

Passengers
- 2023: 931,600

Services
Preceding station	Transilien	Following station
Andrésy towards Paris-St.-Lazare	Line J	Triel-sur-Seine towards Ermont–Eaubonne, Gisors, Mantes-la-Jolie or Vernon
Location

Chanteloup-les-Vignes is a French rail station of the Paris-Saint-Lazare–Mantes-Station line (via Conflans-Sainte-Honorine) located in Chanteloup-les-Vignes, in the departement of the Yvelines, in Île-de-France.

The station is operated by the SNCF (Société nationale des chemins de fer français) and served by trains from the Transilien Line J.

== Location ==
The station is at kilometric point (PK) 31.085 of Paris–Mantes-Station line (via Conflans-Sainte-Honorine).

== History ==
The station opened on June 1, 1892.

On February 2022, the station has been closed for safety reasons after a suspicion of the detection of dangerous devices in a luggage of a passenger, the station reopened shortly later.

== Attendance ==
From 2015 to 2024, according to SNCF estimates, the annual passenger traffic at the station amounted to the figures indicated in the table below:

Year	2015	2016	2017	2018	2019	2020	2021	2022	2023	2024
Passengers	838,046	823,290	796,777	757,040	719,119	331,726	826,353	948,491	931,600	1,026,972

== Service ==
=== Train service ===
The station is served by trains of the Transilien Line J.

=== Connections ===
The station is served by the following bus lines:

- Mantois: 5441
- Poissy - Les Mureaux: 6532 6541

== See also ==
- List of Transilien stations
