= Triel-sur-Seine station =

Railway station in Triel-sur-Seine, France

Triel-sur-Seine
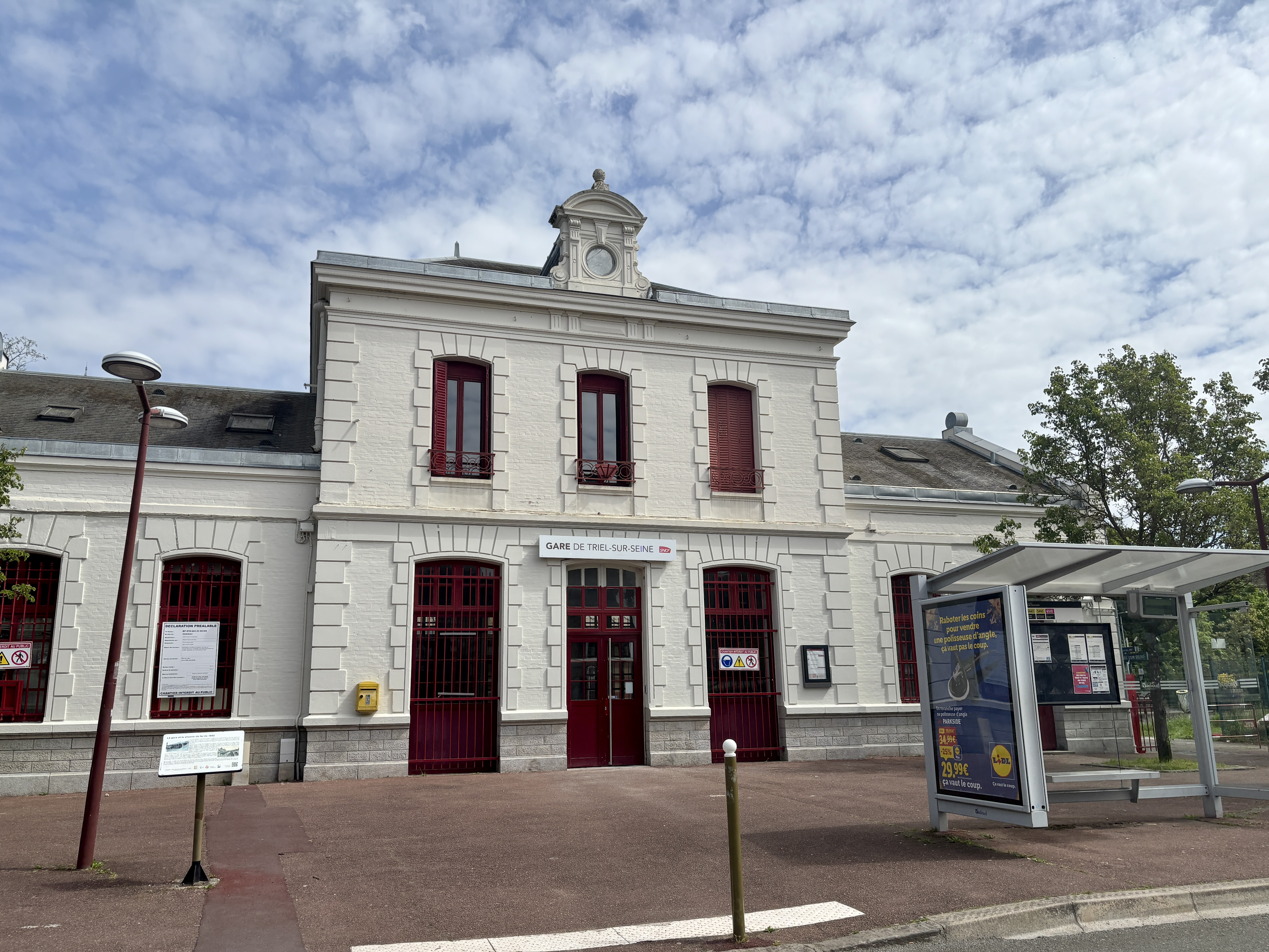
- Entrance to Triel-sur-Seine station

General information
- Location: Place de la Gare; 78510 Triel-sur-Seine; France
- Coordinates: 48°58′52″N 2°00′21″E
- Owner: SNCF
- Operator: SNCF
- Platforms: 2 platforms
- Tracks: 2

Construction
- Accessible: Yes, by prior reservation

Other information
- Station code: 87381806
- Fare zone: 5

History
- Opened: 1 June 1892

Passengers
- 2023: 724,079

Services
Preceding station	Transilien	Following station
Chanteloup-les-Vignes towards Paris-St.-Lazare	Line J	Vaux-sur-Seine towards Ermont–Eaubonne, Gisors, Mantes-la-Jolie or Vernon
Location

Triel-sur-Seine is a French rail station of the Paris-Saint-Lazare–Mantes-Station line (via Conflans-Sainte-Honorine) located in Triel-sur-Seine, in the departement of the Yvelines, in Île-de-France.

The station is operated by the SNCF (Société nationale des chemins de fer français) and served by trains of the Transilien Line J.

== Location ==
The station is at kilometric point (PK) 33.238 of Paris–Mantes-Station line (via Conflans-Sainte-Honorine).

== History ==
The station opened on June 1, 1892.

During the summer of 2005, major renovations were carried out on the platforms, including raising them to accommodate the higher door thresholds of modern trains.

In 2006, the area surrounding the station was also redeveloped: a bus station and a drop-off zone were created in front of the station.

== Attendance ==
From 2015 to 2023, according to SNCF estimates, the annual passenger traffic at the station amounted to the figures indicated in the table below:

Year	2015	2016	2017	2018	2019	2020	2021	2022	2023
Passengers	585,208	594,291	553,796	505,248	463,897	236,971	687,786	771,326	724,079

== Service ==
=== Train service ===
The station is served by trains of the Transilien Line J.

=== Connections ===
The station is served by the following bus lines:

- Mantois: 5441
- Poissy - Les Mureaux: 6510 6564
- Noctilien: N151

== See also ==
- List of Transilien stations
