= Thun-le-Paradis station =

Railway station in Meulan-en-Yvelines, France

Thun-le-Paradis
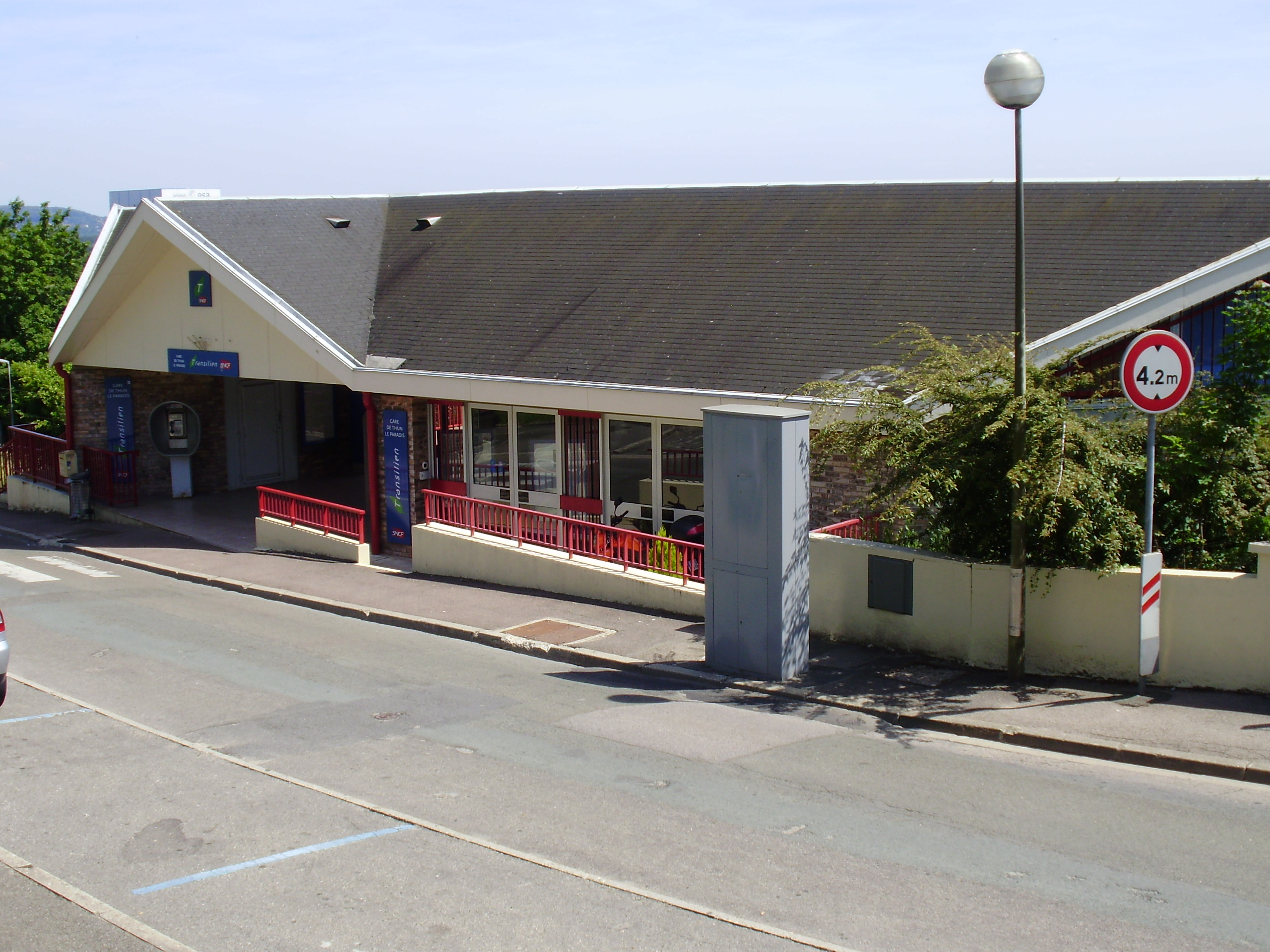
- Entrance to Thun-le-Paradis station

General information
- Location: Rue des Annonciades; 78250 Meulan-en-Yvelines; France
- Coordinates: 49°00′24″N 1°55′09″E
- Owner: SNCF
- Operator: SNCF
- Platforms: 2 platforms
- Tracks: 2

Construction
- Accessible: Yes, by prior reservation

Other information
- Station code: 87381822
- Fare zone: 5

History
- Opened: 1 June 1892

Passengers
- 2023: 476,983

Services
Preceding station	Transilien	Following station
Vaux-sur-Seine towards Paris-St.-Lazare	Line J	Meulan–Hardricourt towards Ermont–Eaubonne, Gisors, Mantes-la-Jolie or Vernon
Location

Thun-le-Paradis is a French rail station of the Paris-Saint-Lazare–Mantes-Station line (via Conflans-Sainte-Honorine) located in Meulan-en-Yvelines, in the departement of the Yvelines, in Île-de-France.

The station is operated by the SNCF (Société nationale des chemins de fer français) and served by trains from the Transilien Line J.

== Location ==
The station is at kilometric point (PK) 801 of Paris–Mantes-Station line (via Conflans-Sainte-Honorine).

== History ==
The station opened on June 1, 1892.

On April 8, 2023, a 43-year old women has been killed after being hit by a train, reports indicated the option of "suicide" has been eliminated.

On July 27, 2025, safety was called into question after a father and his daughter were assaulted by a couple. The perpetrators will be sentenced to prison few months later. Their sentence will be confirmed in appeal.

== Attendance ==
From 2015 to 2023, according to SNCF estimates, the annual passenger traffic at the station amounted to the figures indicated in the table below:

Year	2015	2016	2017	2018	2019	2020	2021	2022	2023
Passengers	345,491	348,143	366,370	377,907	391,728	198,768	432,673	471,681	476,983

== Service ==
=== Train service ===
The station is served by trains of the Transilien Line J.

=== Connections ===
The station is served by the following bus lines:

- Mantois: 5437, 5441
- Poissy - Les Mureaux: 6525 6533 6535 6542 6560 6561 6562 6565 6566

== See also ==
- List of Transilien stations
