= École Notre-Dame les Oiseaux =

Catholic private school

Coordinates: 48.9823°N 1.9752°E

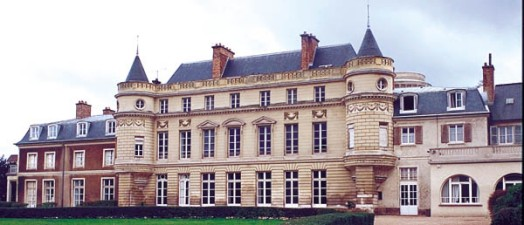

Location
- 106 Grande Rue; 78480 Verneuil-sur-Seine; France

Information
- Type: Private
- Religious affiliation: Catholicism
- Established: 1929
- Director: Guillaume Lesage; Béatrice Parisot
- Website: http://www.ndoverneuil.com/

École Notre-Dame les Oiseaux is a Catholic private school in Verneuil sur Seine, France. It serves levels primaire (primary) through lycée (senior high school/sixth form college).

Notre-Dame International High School is the international school on the same property.

== History ==
=== Château de Romé ===
The school is established to a castle (Château de Romé), in Verneuil-sur-Seine, built in the 12th century by the Montmorency family and modified since, the castle retains its pre-16th century cellars, dovecote and vaulted outbuildings.

Several of its lords are notable: Louis Aleaume (a lawyer who versified in Latin and frequented the poets of the Pléiade), Jean-Jacques Olier (who created the first seminaries and founded the Sulpicians), Ms. Senozan (daughter of Louis V Le Peletier de Rosanbo, granddaughter of Malesherbes, who was lawyer to Louis XVI, and mother of Alexis de Tocqueville), Hervé de Tocqueville, father of Alexis (who resided there during his childhood) and mayor of Verneuil-sur-Seine (he regularly received Chateaubriand), Ms. Mortefontaine (whom the Convention adopted as a daughter), and finally, Mélanie, Princess de Ligne, who subdivided her vast estate in 1925 and thus gave the start to the accelerated development of Verneuil.

The castle was bought in the summer of 1929 by nuns from the Notre-Dame congregation, who founded the school of Notre Dame "Les Oiseaux".

The facades, the roofs of the castle and the chapel have been listed as historical monuments since March 2011.

== Connections ==
=== Train service ===
The school along with Notre-Dame International High School are remotely connected with the train station served by trains of Transilien J.

=== Bus connections ===
The school along with Notre-Dame International High School are connected with these bus lines:

- Mantois: 5409, 5484
- Poissy - Les Mureaux: 6518 6524 6566 6569 6572 6575 6576 6578 6579

== Notable students ==
- Julie Chapon (co-founder of Yuka)
- Kyo members
- Claire Gallois
- Marie-Claude Pietragalla (performer)
