= Hardricourt =

- Commune
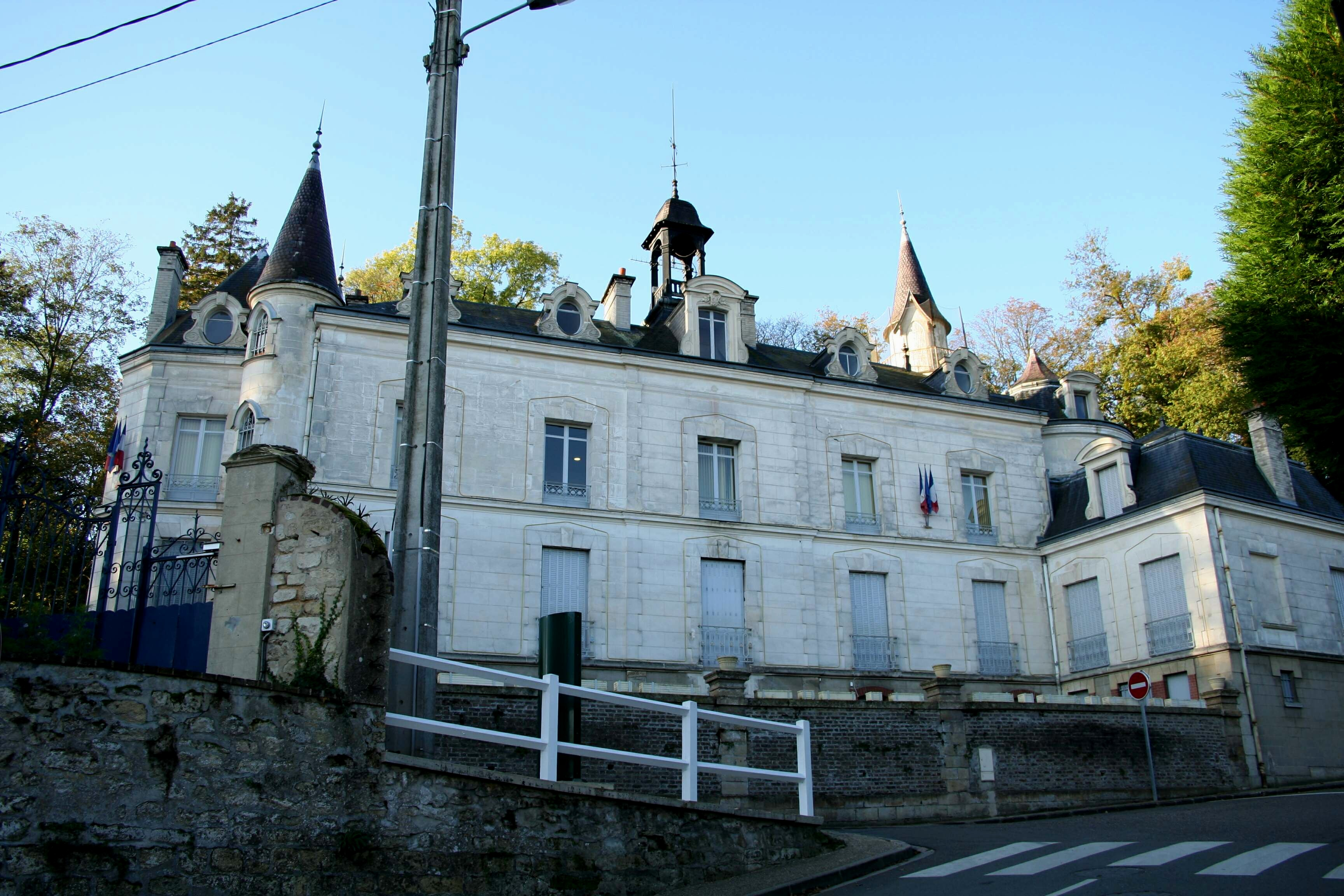
- Town hall

- Coat of arms
- Location of Hardricourt
- Location within France Location within Île-de-France (region)
- Coordinates: 49°00′32″N 1°53′40″E
- Country: France
- Region: Île-de-France
- Department: Yvelines
- Arrondissement: Mantes-la-Jolie
- Canton: Les Mureaux
- Intercommunality: CU Grand Paris Seine et Oise

Government
  - Mayor (2020–2026): Yann Scotte
- Area^{1}: 3.28 km^{2} (1.27 sq mi)
- Elevation: 58 m (190 ft)
- Highest elevation: 118 m (387 ft)
- Lowest elevation: 18 m (59 ft)
- Population (2023): 2,599
  - Density: 792/km^{2} (2,050/sq mi)
- Time zone: UTC+01:00 (CET)
  - Summer (DST): UTC+02:00 (CEST)
- INSEE/Postal code: 78299 /78250
- ^{1} French Land Register data, which excludes lakes, ponds, glaciers > 1 km^{2} (0.386 sq mi or 247 acres) and river estuaries.

Hardricourt (French pronunciation: [aʁdʁikuʁ]) is a commune in the Yvelines department in the Île-de-France region in north-central France.

The castle of Hardricourt was between 1970 and 2011 the property of Jean-Bedel Bokassa, from 1966 dictator and between 1977 and 1979 self-appointed emperor of the Central African Republic. He was overthrown in 1977 and, after a period in the Ivory Coast, lived in the castle in exile from c. 1983 to 1986.

== Population ==
Historical population
Year	Pop.	±% p.a.
1968	1,431	—
1975	1,636	+1.93%
1982	1,568	−0.60%
1990	1,989	+3.02%
1999	1,918	−0.40%
2007	1,978	+0.39%
2012	2,070	+0.91%
2017	2,289	+2.03%
2023	2,599	+2.14%
Source: INSEE

== See also ==
- Communes of the Yvelines department
