= Poissy station =

Railway station in Poissy, France

Poissy
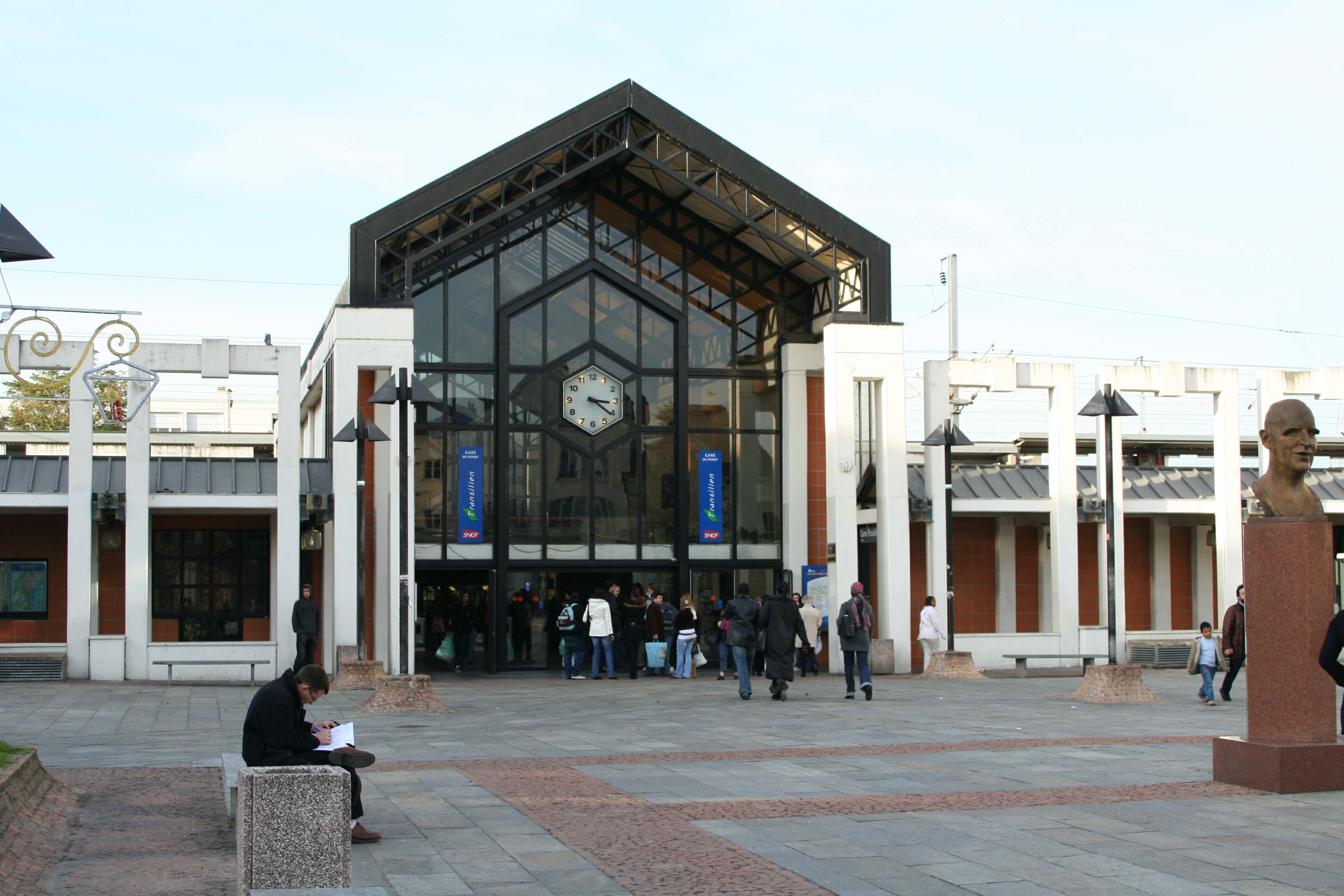
- Entrance to Poissy station

General information
- Location: 14, place Georges-Pompidou; Poissy; France
- Coordinates: 48°55′59″N 2°02′24″E
- Owner: RATP; SNCF
- Operator: RATP Group
- Platforms: 3 island platforms
- Tracks: 5

Construction
- Accessible: Yes, by prior reservation

Other information
- Station code: 87386573
- Fare zone: 5

History
- Opened: 9 May 1843

Passengers
- 2024: 13,098,813

Services
Preceding station	RER	Following station
Terminus	RER A	Achères–Grand-Cormier towards Boissy-Saint-Léger or Marne-la-Vallée–Chessy
Preceding station	Transilien	Following station
Houilles–Carrières-sur-Seine towards Paris-St.-Lazare	Line J	Villennes-sur-Seine towards Vernon–Giverny
Location

Poissy is a rail station of the Paris-Saint-Lazare–Le Havre line located in Poissy, Île-de-France, France.

The station opened in 1843 and operated by the compagnie du chemin de fer de Paris à Rouen.

The station is operated by the SNCF (Société nationale des chemins de fer français) and served by trains from the RER A and the Transilien Line J.

== Location ==
The station is at kilometric point 25.835 of Paris–Le Havre railway.

== History ==
The station was inaugurated on 9 May 1843, then rebuilt in the 1870s. The building was dismantled in 1987 to make room for the current station. From 29 May 1989, the station has been a terminus of one of the three western branches of RER A.

=== Éole ===
A experimentarion took place between June 12, 2017 and July 13, 2017 regarding the redevelopment of the station and its surroundings; three scenarios were proposed: "basic", "intermediate" and "maximum", with estimated budgets of €13.5 million, €18 million and €23.5 million respectively. This redevelopment includes in all cases a pedestrian connection with the future station of the Tramway Line 13.

On August 18, 2018, a new 21-meter-long, 57-tonne railway bridge was installed over the D30.

== Attendance ==
From 2015 to 2024, according to SNCF estimates, the annual passenger traffic at the station amounted to the figures indicated in the table below:

Année	2015	2016	2017	2018	2019	2020	2021	2022	2023	2023
Fréquentation	10,598,535	10,764,545	10,895,097	10,810,112	10,787,497	5,232,942	7,308,400	11,163,637	11,878,444	13,098,813

== Service ==
=== Train service ===
Poissy is served by RER A trains running on branch A5. It is its terminus. Service frequency is three trains an hour at off-peak time, six trains an hour during peak hours and two trains an hour at evenings. Journey time to La Défense is around 20 minutes, and around 30 minutes to Châtelet–Les Halles.

The station is also served by Transilien line J. Service frequency is two trains an hour at off-peak times and at evenings, and two or three trains an hour during peak hours. Journey time to Paris Saint-Lazare is around 20 minutes.

=== Connections ===
The station is served by the following bus lines:

- Cergy-Pontoise Confluence: 1205
- Lignes Île-de-France Ouest: 7804, 7816
- Centre et Sud Yvelines: 5314
- Mantois: 5433, 5437, 5438, 5448, 5458
- Saint-Germain - Boucles de Seine: 6308
- Poissy - Les Mureaux: 6501 6502 6503 6505 6510 6512 6516 6529 6534 6536 6540 6542 6543 6551 6552 6553 6555 6559 6568
  6571 6591 6592 6594 7809
- Noctilien: N151 N155

== Projects ==
=== Extension of the Tramway Line 13 ===
The project of the entension of the Tramway Line 13 by 10.5 km, inaugurated in July 2022, is planned between Saint-Germain-en-Laye and Achères-Ville by 2028. This extension will include four stations: Poissy Gambetta, Poissy (pedestrian connection), Poissy ZAC, and Achères-Ville.

=== Extension of the RER E ===
In 2028 or 2029, the station is schedulded to be connected with the RER E due of his extension to Mantes-la-Jolie, replacing the branch Paris-Saint-Lazare – Mantes-la-Jolie (via Poissy).

== See also ==
- List of stations of the Paris RER
