= Aubergenville =

- Commune
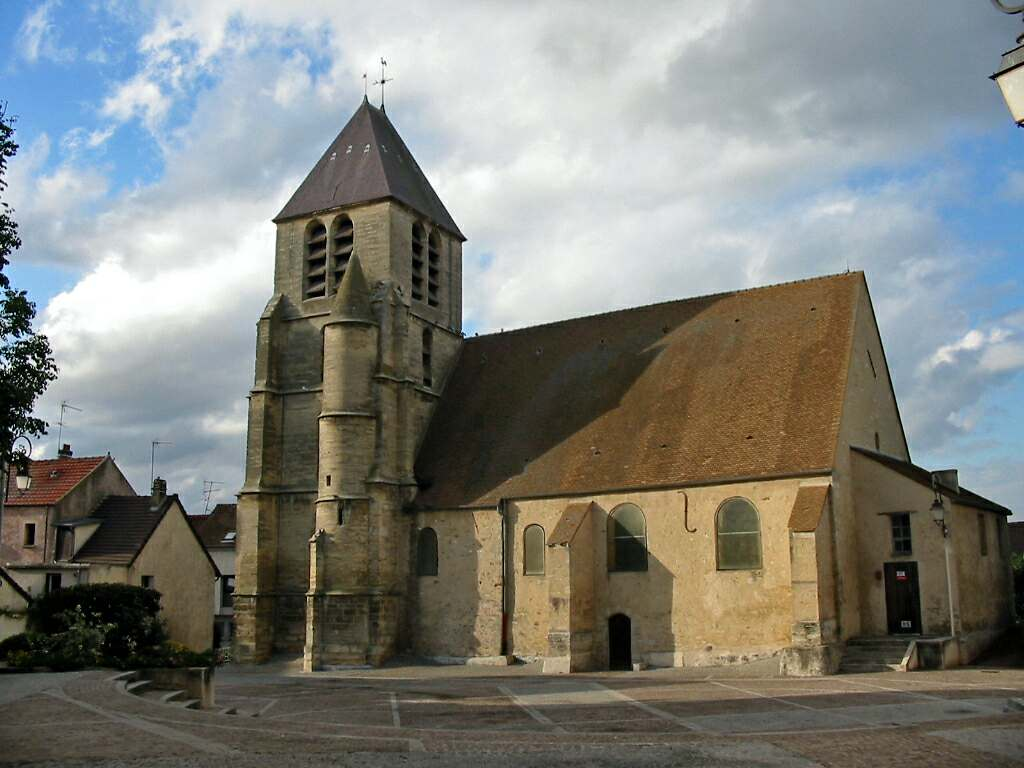
- The church in Aubergenville

- Coat of arms
- Location of Aubergenville
- Location within France Location within Île-de-France (region)
- Coordinates: 48°57′32″N 1°51′18″E
- Country: France
- Region: Île-de-France
- Department: Yvelines
- Arrondissement: Mantes-la-Jolie
- Canton: Aubergenville
- Intercommunality: CU Grand Paris Seine Oise

Government
  - Mayor (2020–2026): Gilles Lécole
- Area^{1}: 8.83 km^{2} (3.41 sq mi)
- Elevation: 57 m (187 ft)
- Highest elevation: 142 m (466 ft)
- Lowest elevation: 47 m (154 ft)
- Population (2023): 12,723
  - Density: 1,440/km^{2} (3,730/sq mi)
- Time zone: UTC+01:00 (CET)
  - Summer (DST): UTC+02:00 (CEST)
- INSEE/Postal code: 78029 /78410
- ^{1} French Land Register data, which excludes lakes, ponds, glaciers > 1 km^{2} (0.386 sq mi or 247 acres) and river estuaries.

Aubergenville (French pronunciation: [obɛʁʒɑ̃vil]) is a commune in the Yvelines department in north-central France. It is located between Mantes-la-Jolie and Saint-Germain-en-Laye, in the valley of the Seine. This city is located near the Côteau de Montgardé on the road to Normandy.

== Founding ==
At the time tradition, marked by the installation in Versailles of Monarchy (1672), three fields structured the commune: The field of Acosta, in 1661, was acquired by Mr. de Mannevillette, who built the castle as well as the two houses located on both sides of the town. In 1671, a great number of trees were planted in the park of the castle: charms, birches, elms, wild cherry trees, chestnuts and 400 fir trees. It is into 1758 that the property was acquired by Such of Acosta, which left the ground its name. The field of Garenne which extends close to the river was in the beginning a vast flanked middle-class house of an important farmer. Around 1766, it was transformed into a castle. Its new owner acquires a great number of pieces of historical information and items, unique to the field. The field of Montgardé of which, in 1416, was purchased by the chapter of Notre Dame de Paris. In the 15th century, the old farm was converted into a middle-class house and became the residence of the lords of Nézel after the destruction of their castle.

== Demographics ==
Historical population

Year	Pop.	±% p.a.
1793	574	—
1800	655	+1.90%
1806	659	+0.10%
1821	620	−0.41%
1831	571	−0.82%
1836	495	−2.82%
1841	504	+0.36%
1846	545	+1.58%
1851	494	−1.95%
1856	466	−1.16%
1861	450	−0.70%
1866	481	+1.34%
1872	479	−0.07%
1876	483	+0.21%
1881	474	−0.38%
1886	527	+2.14%
1891	523	−0.15%
1896	472	−2.03%
1901	468	−0.17%

Year	Pop.	±% p.a.
1906	488	+0.84%
1911	506	+0.73%
1921	560	+1.02%
1926	840	+8.45%
1931	1,118	+5.88%
1936	1,089	−0.52%
1946	1,102	+0.12%
1954	1,942	+7.34%
1962	2,729	+4.34%
1968	7,513	+18.39%
1975	10,242	+4.53%
1982	10,010	−0.33%
1990	11,776	+2.05%
1999	11,667	−0.10%
2007	12,189	+0.55%
2012	11,622	−0.95%
2017	11,817	+0.33%
2023	12,723	+1.24%

Source: EHESS and INSEE (1968-2023)

== History ==
The destiny of Aubergenville was marked by the French Revolution by law of 2 November 1789, which removes the monastic orders and declares property national all the goods of the clergy. With the passing of years, constructions became more consequent until the residents were able to build larger houses, suitable for starting larger families.

A rural world settled gradually and their life was changed by the great events which marked France from around 1400 AD to 1900 AD (Epidemic of Cholera, Wars, other disease outbreaks) and of the more pleasant events at the local level.

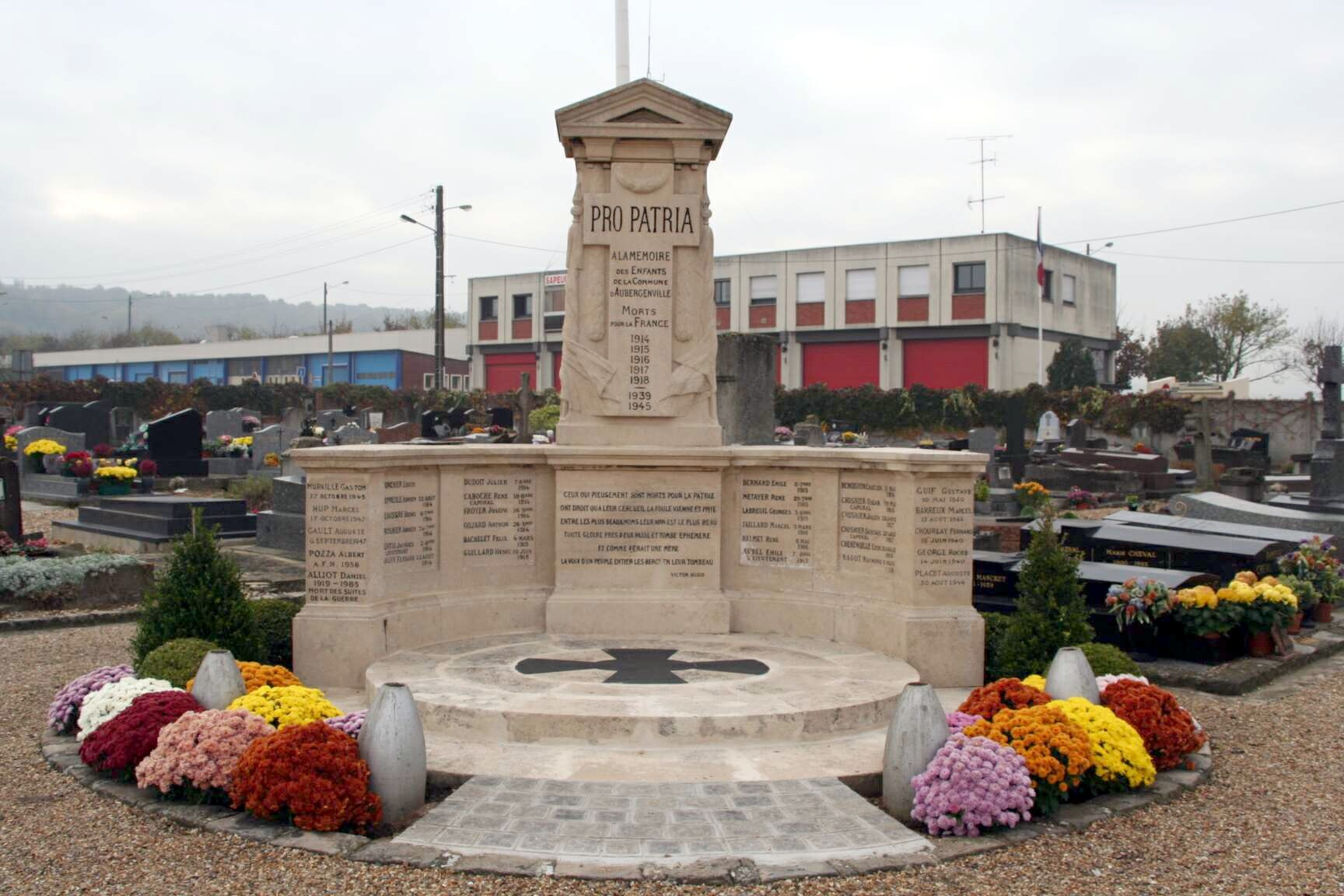

In 1780, the construction of the royal road between Mantes and Saint-Germain introduced the first and strongest lines to other villages, towns and cities. The removal of certain grounds to the profit of roads pushed the inhabitants to find a solution to reduce the damage. They proposed a modification of the layout and its recovery by complaining to the council. This would have had the advantage of generating an increase of people to the town. Instead of that, the village tended to move away from the road to avoid this happening.

In 1843, the railway from Paris to Rouen was constructed. With the origin, the station of Aubergenville was equipped only with one stop for travellers. Following these evolutions, the council then built a number of industrial buildings and houses to accommodate the great number of very varied industrial activities.

On 10 May 1944, a Royal Air Force Lancaster airplane crashed in Aubergenville. Seven airmen died in the crash and are buried in Aubergenville cemetery.

After the war, there was an important transformation in the landscape and the local ways of life. Then the Renault factory was established in Flins in 1952 and Aubergenville saw its population multiplied by 5 in almost 20 years. Aubergenville then passed from the stage of borough to that of city. Located at 80% on the territory of Aubergenville, the factory bears the name of Flins all the same. The site was retained to share the ideal situation for the time. The barges could bring weighty materials, and later the motorway of the west was born and allowed faster connections with the head office of Boulogne-Billancourt. The colossal size of the Renault factory and the brief history which precedes made it possible to appreciate the extent of the repercussions which appear on the territory. It is necessary to place and build all the equipment necessary to the employees and their families. (employees' houses, etc.)

== Personalities ==
- Kévin Afougou, footballer
- Tony Diagne, footballer
- Sébastien Schuller, Musician

== International relations ==
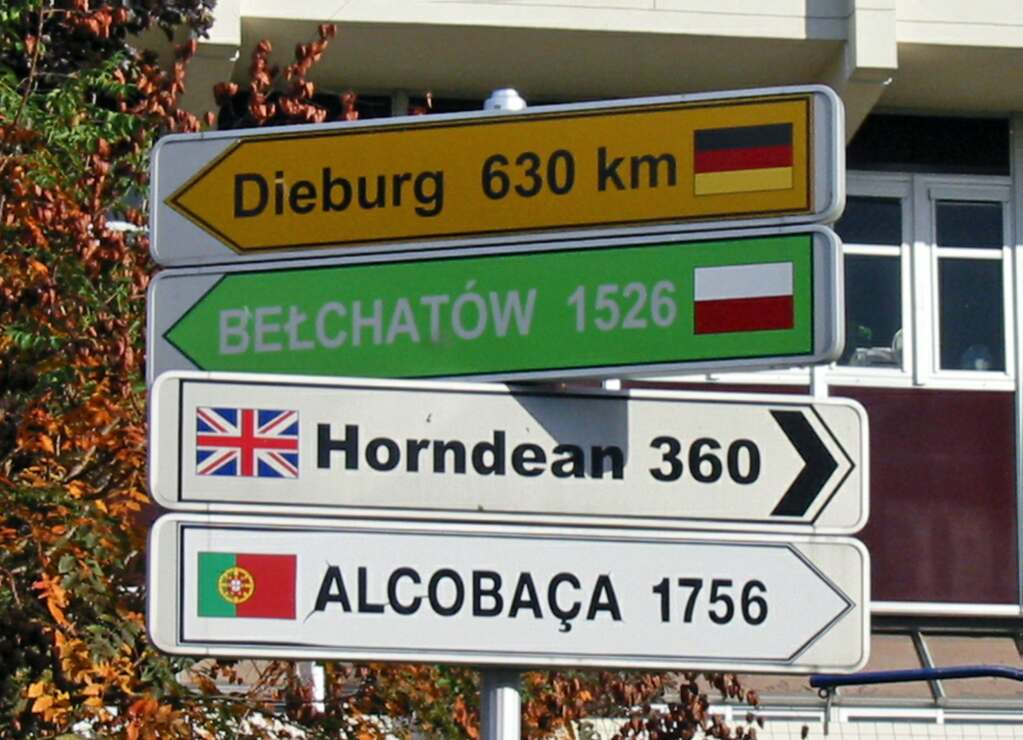
Aubergenville Villes jumelées (town twinnings)

Aubergenville is twinned with:

- Bełchatów in Poland
- Alcobaça in Portugal
- Dieburg in Germany
- Horndean in England

== See also ==
- Communes of the Yvelines department
