= Verneuil-sur-Seine =

- Commune
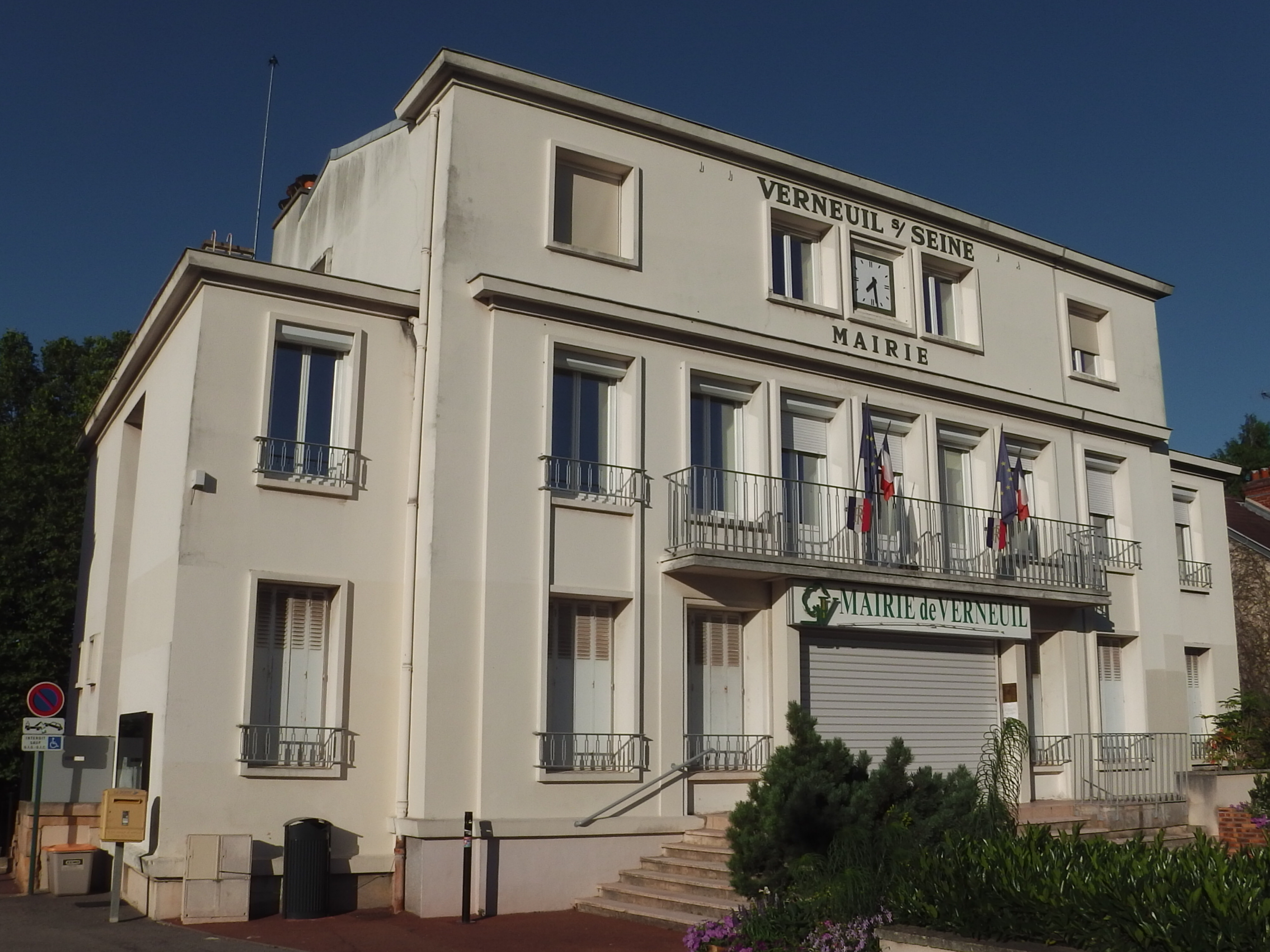
- Town hall

- Coat of arms
- Location of Verneuil-sur-Seine
- Location within France Location within Île-de-France (region)
- Coordinates: 48°58′50″N 1°58′29″E
- Country: France
- Region: Île-de-France
- Department: Yvelines
- Arrondissement: Saint-Germain-en-Laye
- Canton: Verneuil-sur-Seine
- Intercommunality: CU Grand Paris Seine et Oise

Government
  - Mayor (2020–2026): Fabien Aufrechter
- Area^{1}: 9.43 km^{2} (3.64 sq mi)
- Highest elevation: 69 m (226 ft)
- Lowest elevation: 17 m (56 ft)
- Population (2023): 16,280
  - Density: 1,730/km^{2} (4,470/sq mi)
- Time zone: UTC+01:00 (CET)
  - Summer (DST): UTC+02:00 (CEST)
- INSEE/Postal code: 78642 /78480
- ^{1} French Land Register data, which excludes lakes, ponds, glaciers > 1 km^{2} (0.386 sq mi or 247 acres) and river estuaries.

Verneuil-sur-Seine (French pronunciation: [vɛʁnœj syʁ sɛn], literally Verneuil on Seine) is a commune in the Yvelines department in the Île-de-France in north-central France.

== Population ==
Historical population
Year	Pop.	±% p.a.
1968	7,405	—
1975	9,988	+4.37%
1982	11,303	+1.78%
1990	12,499	+1.27%
1999	14,538	+1.69%
2007	15,524	+0.82%
2012	15,290	−0.30%
2017	15,577	+0.37%
2023	16,280	+0.74%
Source: INSEE

== Education ==
Schools include:

Preschools:

- École La Garenne
- École du Chemin Vert
- École Joseph-Kosma
- École Jean-Jaurès
- École Françoise-Dolto
- École Jacques-Prévert

Elementary schools:

- École Jean-Jaurès
- École La Garenne
- École La Source

Public junior high schools:

- Collège Jean-Zay

Private:

- École Notre-Dame les Oiseaux (preschool/nursery through senior high school/sixth form college)
  - Notre-Dame International High School is a part of this institution

== Twin towns – sister cities ==
Verneuil-sur-Seine is twinned with:

- Aguilar de la Frontera, Spain
- Weiterstadt, Germany

== See also ==
- Communes of the Yvelines department
