= Vaux-sur-Seine =

- Commune
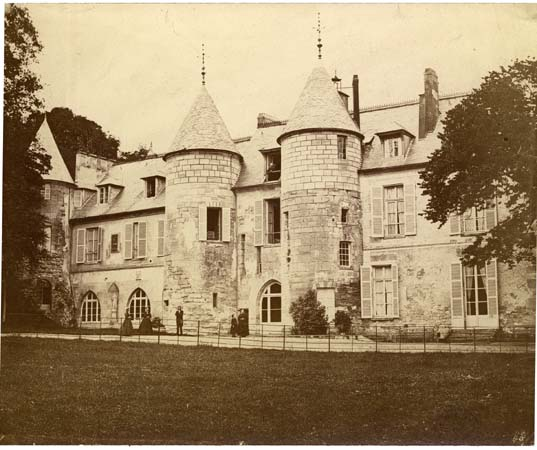
- The Chateau de Vaux, in 1887

- Coat of arms
- Location of Vaux-sur-Seine
- Location within France Location within Île-de-France (region)
- Coordinates: 49°00′30″N 1°57′50″E
- Country: France
- Region: Île-de-France
- Department: Yvelines
- Arrondissement: Mantes-la-Jolie
- Canton: Les Mureaux
- Intercommunality: CU Grand Paris Seine et Oise

Government
  - Mayor (2020–2026): Jean-Claude Bréard
- Area^{1}: 8.45 km^{2} (3.26 sq mi)
- Elevation: 25 m (82 ft)
- Highest elevation: 191 m (627 ft)
- Lowest elevation: 18 m (59 ft)
- Population (2023): 5,202
  - Density: 616/km^{2} (1,590/sq mi)
- Time zone: UTC+01:00 (CET)
  - Summer (DST): UTC+02:00 (CEST)
- INSEE/Postal code: 78638 /78740
- ^{1} French Land Register data, which excludes lakes, ponds, glaciers > 1 km^{2} (0.386 sq mi or 247 acres) and river estuaries.

Vaux-sur-Seine (French pronunciation: [vo syʁ sɛn], literally Vaux on Seine) is a commune in the Yvelines department in the Île-de-France in north-central France.

== Population ==
Historical population
Year	Pop.	±% p.a.
1968	2,736	—
1975	2,851	+0.59%
1982	3,105	+1.23%
1990	3,790	+2.52%
1999	4,369	+1.59%
2007	4,800	+1.18%
2012	4,782	−0.08%
2017	4,927	+0.60%
2023	5,202	+0.91%
Source: INSEE

== See also ==
- Communes of the Yvelines department
