= Mantes-la-Jolie station =

Railway station in Mantes-la-Jolie, France

Coordinates: 48°59′24″N 1°42′10″E

Mantes-la-Jolie
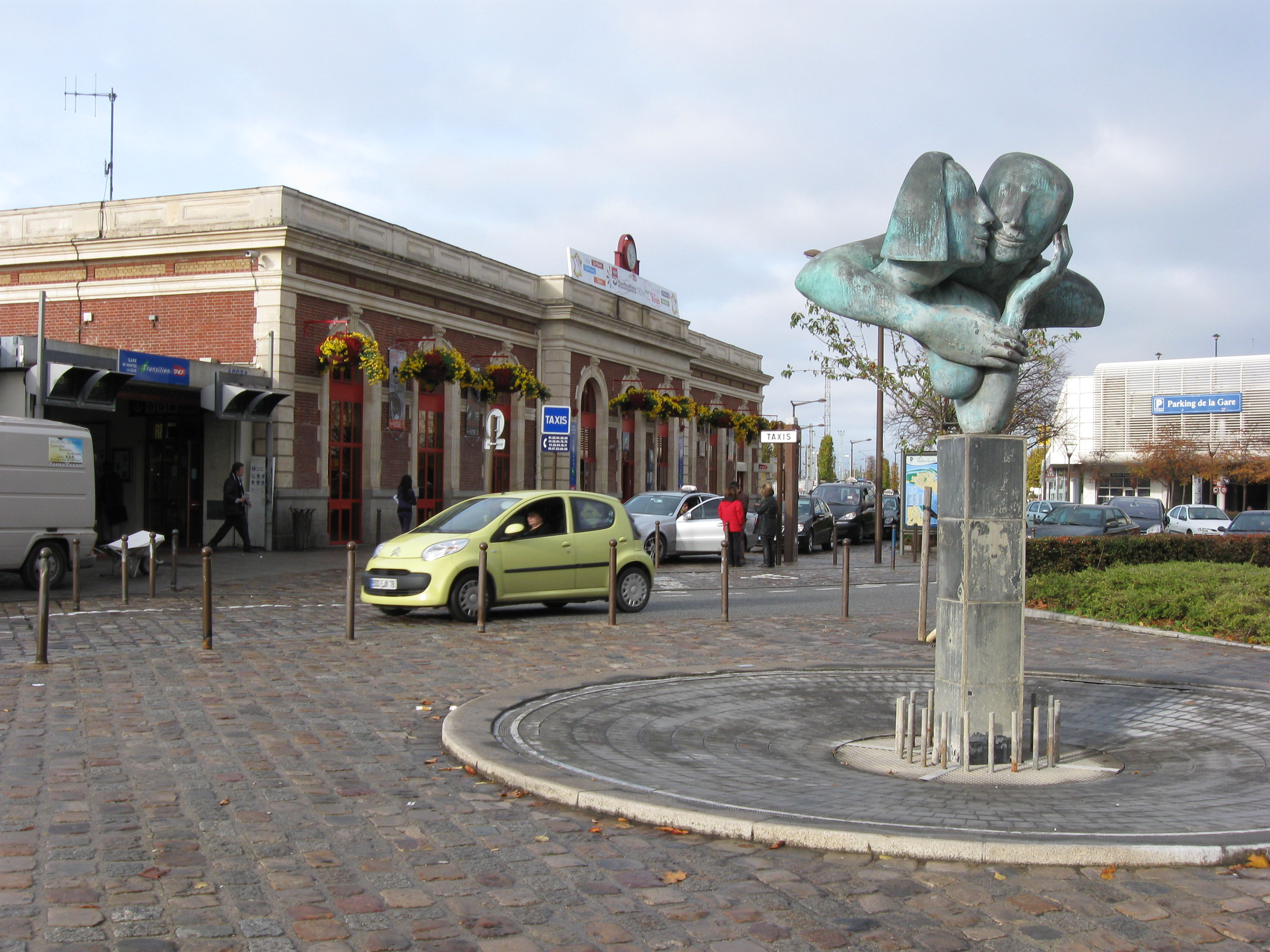

General information
- Location: Place du 8 mai 1945; 78200 Mantes-la-Jolie; Yvelines; France
- Lines: TGV Intercités; TER Normandie; Transilien Future: RER E

Other information
- Station code: 87381509

History
- Opened: 9 May 1843; 183 years ago

Passengers
- 2024: 9,911,587
Services
Preceding station	TER Normandie	Following station
Rosny-sur-Seine towards Rouen-RD	Citi	Paris-Saint-Lazare Terminus
Bréval towards Serquigny	Citi	Paris-Saint-Lazare Terminus
Preceding station	SNCF	Following station
Rouen-Rive-Droite towards Le Havre	TGV	Versailles-Chantiers towards Marseille
Preceding station	Transilien	Following station
Mantes-Station towards Paris-St.-Lazare	Line J	Terminus
Mantes-Station towards Paris-St.-Lazare	Line J	Rosny-sur-Seine towards Vernon–Giverny
Épône-Mézières towards Paris-Montparnasse	Line N	Terminus
Location

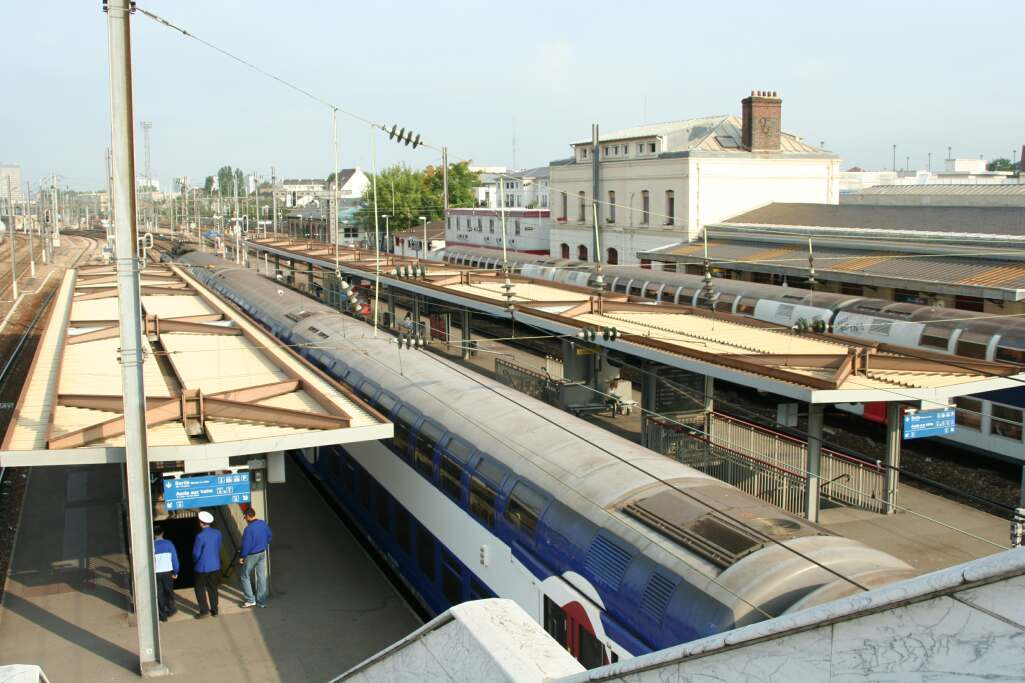
The station platforms

Mantes-la-Jolie is a railway station in the town Mantes-la-Jolie, Yvelines department, northwestern France. It is on the Paris to Le Havre railway at the point where the line to Caen and Cherbourg diverges. The station is planned to be the future terminus of the line E of the Réseau Express Régional (RER), on an extension from Nanterre–La Folie station in Paris.

== History ==
The station opened on 9 May 1843, with the opening, by the Compagnie du chemin de fer de Paris à Rouen, of the line between La Garenne-Colombes station and Rouen-Rive Gauche station. The line was extended in 1847, to form the Paris to Le Havre railway. The Mantes-la-Jolie to Cherbourg railway opened in stages between 1855 and 1858. Also in 1855, both lines became part of the Chemins de fer de l'Ouest.

In preparation for the extension of RER line E, the station has been modernised and expanded, and the revamped station opened on 4 April 2023. The rebuilt facilities are intended to handle 10,000 passengers a day instead of the current 6,000, and include an accessibility upgrade. The work cost €35m.

== Services ==
The station is served by several TGV trains from Le Havre and Cherbourg to Paris and further (Lyon, Marseille). Besides regional Transilien trains, TER Normandie trains to Rouen and Évreux also call here.

== Future ==
The extension of RER line E to Mantes-La-Jolie is planned for December 2026. It is planned that it will be served by 6 trains per hour, which will run through to Rosa Parks station in the centre of Paris.
