= Cergy-Pontoise Confluence bus network =

Bus network in France

Cergy-Pontoise Confluence
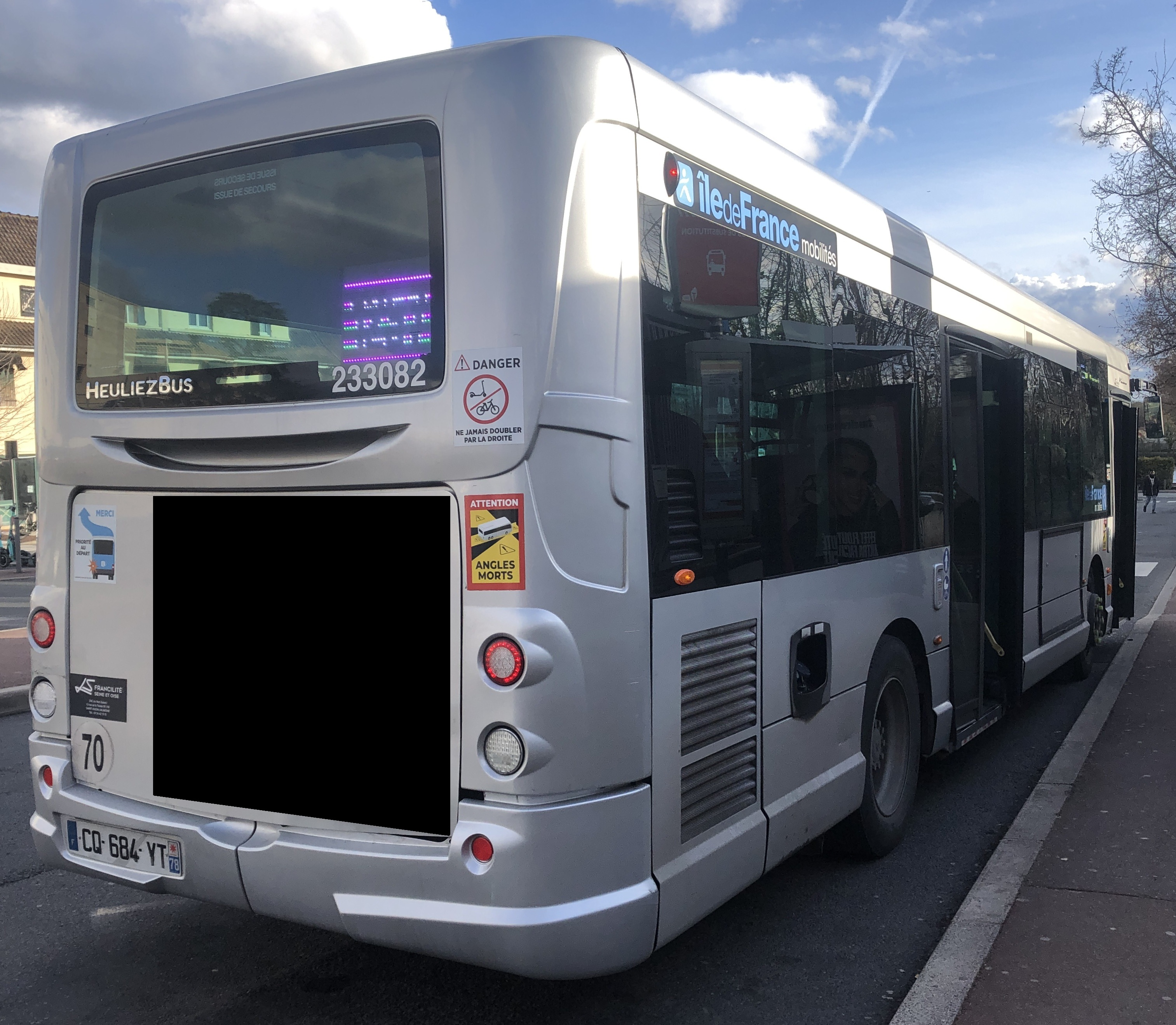
- Heuliez GX 127 L n°233082 at Conflans-Fin-d'Oise station, Conflans-Sainte-Honorine.
- Parent: Île-de-France Mobilités
- Founded: 1974 (STIVO); January 1, 2024 (CPC)
- Service area: Yvelines: Achères, Conflans-Sainte-Honorine, Poissy, Saint-Germain-en-Laye; Val-d'Oise: Boisemont, Cergy, Courdimanche, Éragny, Herblay-sur-Seine, Jouy-le-Moutier, Menucourt, Méry-sur-Oise, Neuville-sur-Oise, Osny, Pontoise, Saint-Ouen-l'Aumône, Vauréal
- Routes: 1201 1202 1203 1204 1205; 1206 1207 1208 1221 1222; 1223 1224 1225 1226 1227; 1228 1229 1230 1231 1232; 1233 1234 1235 1236 1237; 1238 1239 1240 1241 1242; 1255 1257
- Operator: CFTR (Francilité Seine et Oise)
- Website: Cergy-Pontoise Confluence website

Cergy-Pontoise Confluence is a French bus network run by Île-de-France Mobilités, operated by Compagnie française des transports régionaux (CFTR) via his subsidiary Francilité Seine et Oise from January 1, 2024. The network was created thanks of a merging of SAVAC and Cars Lacroix.

It consists of 32 lines which mainly serve the Communauté d'agglomération de Cergy-Pontoise in the Val-d'Oise, as well of Conflans-Sainte-Honorine and Achères in the Yvelines.

== History ==
=== Cergy-Pontoise Confluence network ===
==== Opening to the competition ====
Due to the opening up of public transport to competition in Île-de-France, the Cergy-Pontoise Confluence bus network will be created on January 1, 2024, corresponding to public service delegation number 2 established by Île-de-France Mobilités. An invitation to tender was therefore opened by the organizing authority in order to designate a company which will operate the network for a period of six years. It is finally the group Compagnie française des transports régionaux (CFTR) via his society Francilité Seine et Oise, who was designated during the board of directors on June 28, 2023.

At the date of its opening to competition, the network consisted of the lines 29, 30, 33, 34, 35, 36, 38, 39, 40, 42, 43, 44, 45, 46, 47, 48A, 48B, 48C, 49, 55, 56, 57, 58, 59 and 60 of the STIVO and of lines 4, 5, 5S, 11, 14, 17A, 17B, A1 and A2 of Transdev Conflans.

==== Network renaming ====
Since September 2, 2024, the Cergy-Pontoise Confluence network has been applying the new principle of single regional numbering planned by Île-de-France Mobilités, in order to remove duplicated lines. The correspondence between old and new numbers is as follows:

Network renaming
Old	New
45	1201
42	1202
34	1203
4	1204
5	1205
35	1206
48ABC	1207
49	1208
A1	1221
A2	1222
43	1223
44	1224
55	1225
56	1226
17AB	1227
58	1228
29	1229
30	1230
11	1231
57	1232
33	1233
14	1234
46	1235
36	1236
47	1237
38	1238
39	1239
40	1240
59	1241
60	1242
5S	1255
17S	1257

==== 2024–25 strikes ====
In 2024, a strike notice was filed for the period from October 23, 2024, to May 31, 2025.

This general strike was organized by the drivers of the Cergy-Pontoise Confluence bus network since 11 July 2024 impacting the entire Cergy-Pontoise urban area as well as neighboring towns. The strikers are reportedly demanding better working conditions, which have deteriorated since the end of the takeover of the STIVO by the new manager

Since mid-December 2024, traffic will gradually resume on lines 1201 1202 1227 . However, in February, traffic still had not resumed normally, with numerous delays and cancelled buses.

In February 2025, a reimbursement campaign is announced by Île-de-France Mobilités for users with a monthly subscription Navigo, Imagine'R. The amount of this reimbursement would be €261.60 and will be made available to users on the IDFM website from February 27, 2025.

== Routes ==
Image	Line	First direction	Second direction
	1201	Gare de Pontoise — Canrobert	Cergy — Lycée Jules-Verne
	1202	Gare de Cergy–Préfecture	Pontoise — Boulevard des Beurriers
	1203	Gare de Cergy–Le Haut	Gare de Neuville-Université
	1204	Gare de Saint-Germain-en-Laye	Gare de Conflans-Sainte-Honorine — Place Romagné
	1205	Gare de Poissy	Gare de Conflans-Sainte-Honorine — Place Romagné
	1206	Gare de Pontoise — Place du Général de Gaulle	Gare de Cergy–Le Haut
	1207	Gare de Cergy–Préfecture	Vauréal — Les Toupets; Vauréal — Ecancourt
	1208	Gare de Cergy–Préfecture	Gare de Neuville-Université
	1221	Gare d'Achères-Ville (circular line)	
	1222	Gare d'Achères-Ville (circular line)	
	1223	Gare de Pontoise — Place du Général de Gaulle	Osny — Les Pâtis
	1224	Gare de Cergy–Préfecture	Gare de Cergy-Saint-Christophe
	1225	Gare de Conflans-Sainte-Honorine — Place Romagné	Gare de Saint-Ouen-l'Aumône-Liesse
	1226	Gare de Cergy–Préfecture	Gare de Méry-sur-Oise
	1227	Gare de Conflans-Fin-d'Oise (circular line)	
	1228	Gare de Cergy–Préfecture	Saint-Ouen-l'Aumône — Rue de l'Équerre
	1229	Gare de Pontoise — Canrobert	Gare de Neuville-Université
	1230	Gare de Pontoise — Canrobert (circular line)	
	1231	Gare de Conflans-Sainte-Honorine — Place Romagné	Herblay-sur-Seine - Buttes Blanches
	1232	Gare de Cergy–Préfecture	Saint-Ouen-l'Aumône — Lycée Jean-Perrin
	1233	Gare de Pontoise — Place du Général de Gaulle	Gare de Neuville-Université
	1234	Gare de Conflans-Fin-d'Oise	Gare de Conflans-Sainte-Honorine — Place Romagné
	1235	Gare de Pontoise — Canrobert	Gare de Cergy-Saint-Christophe
	1236	Gare de Pontoise — Canrobert	Courdimanche — Les Croizettes
	1237	Gare de Conflans-Fin-d'Oise	Vauréal — La Bussie; Vauréal — Georges Brassens
	1238	Gare de Cergy–Préfecture	Menucourt — La Taillette
	1239	Gare de Cergy-Saint-Christophe	Menucourt — Croix du Jubilé
	1240	Gare de Cergy-Saint-Christophe	Vauréal — La Siaule
	1241	Gare de Cergy–Préfecture	Saint-Ouen-L'Aumône — Fond de Vaux
	1242	Gare de Cergy–Préfecture	Osny — Clinique Sainte-Marie
	1255	Saint-Germain-en-Laye — Ecole Notre Dame	Gare de Conflans-Sainte-Honorine — Place Romagné; Herblay-sur-Seine — Pompiers
	1257	Gare de Conflans-Fin-d'Oise (circular line)	

== See also ==
- Île-de-France Mobilités
