= Société de Transport Interurbains du Val d'Oise =

French bus company

- Founded: 1974
- Ceased operation: 31 December 2023 (renamed Cergy-Pontoise Confluence)
- Headquarters: Génicourt
- Locale: Cergy-Pontoise
- Service area: France
- Service type: Urban bus service
- Routes: 18 lines
- Stops: 584 stops, 288 shelters
- Fleet: 97 buses, 34 articulated
- Daily ridership: 78 000
- Website: http://www.stivo.com

The Société de Transport Interurbains du Val d'Oise, or STIVO, is the bus company operating urban buses in Cergy-Pontoise in the département of Val-d'Oise, France. The company was created in 1974 by Cars Giraux and Cars Lacroix with the task of transporting the increasing population of the new town of Cergy-Pontoise. At the time, the network consisted of two lines.

In 1975, It's the RATP which manages the network of the new city and charters the STIVO, the historical operator. The lines are numbered in the 400 range, according to the general RATP Paris region plan, which reserves this range for new cities. The network consisted of 6 lines.

Initially based in Pontoise, STIVO moved to Génicourt in 1986 and acquired a real depot; until then, buses had been parked in bus stations.

In 1989, the network consisted of 14 lines.

In the 1990s, the company sold its services under the StAN. The StAN's line were numbered 4xx along with the bus line numbering scheme in Île-de-France. In 1994, the StAN created two new lines, 434N and 434S, orbiting the new town and serving most of the peripheral communes, and introduced a new livery of turquoise and light blue with a new logo in the shape of an N, symbolising the meander of the river Oise around which the city is built.

In 1999, as part of the opening of Neuville-Université station, lines 441 and 454 were replaced by lines 434 North and 434 South (current lines 35 and 34).

In 2000, the STIVO network was named the best bus network in the Île-de-France region (in terms of service level). The following year, the numbering system in the 400 range inherited from the RATP was abandoned: for example, line 442 was renumbered 42.

On 17 September 2004, STIVO introduced a new livery. Couleur et matière, specialist in road equipment livery, conceived the new graphical identity jointly with the new town's council's change of logo. Application of the livery consisted of light paint for the background and vinyl shapes.

In September 2005, a daytime branch of line 39 was created to the commune of Boisemont following its membership in the urban community.

In early 2007, following the sale of the Giraux group, STIVO became a joint subsidiary of the Lacroix group and RATP Dev, itself a subsidiary of RATP.

In November 2010, the STIF livery entered service on the network.

In June 2013, the STIVO depot was relocated to Saint-Ouen-l'Aumône, at 13 rue de la Tréate (line 56, La Tréate stop).

In July 2015, the first hybrid buses arrived, the first of which entered service on 10 August 2015.

In February 2016, the STIVO depot was expanded to accommodate 45 new articulated buses in the future, in anticipation of a possible network expansion. Then, in September 2016-, the official launch of the "My Stivo" smartphone app (real-time bus timetables available).

Summer route 29 was created in 2017.

In January 2018, the Île-de-France Mobilités livery entered service on the network.

In December 2020, the first buses running on natural gas vehicle (NGV) entered service.

In 2021, RATP Cap Île-de-France took over RATP Dev's Île-de-France operations.

On 6 November 2023, line 46 has been created, connecting Pontoise station and Cergy-Saint-Christophe station with a fast connection lasting around 20 minutes. This new line will strengthen the transport offer in Cergy-Pontoise, making the Plaine des Linandes now accessible by bus. It serves in particular Aren'ice and Dassault Aviation.

Due to the opening up to competition of public transport in Île-de-France, the Cergy-Pontoise Confluence bus network was created on 1 January 2024, corresponding to public service delegation number 2 established by Île-de-France Mobilités. A call for tenders was therefore launched by the organizing authority in order to designate a company which will operate the network for a period of six years. It was finally the CFTR group, through the Francilité Seine et Oise company, which was designated during the board of directors of 28 June 2023.

== Fleet ==
- Heuliez GX 417
- Renault Agora S
- Renault Agora L
- Renault PR100
