= Conflans-Fin-d'Oise station =

Railway station in Conflans-Sainte-Honorine, France

Coordinates: 48.991°N 2.074°E

Conflans-Fin-d'Oise
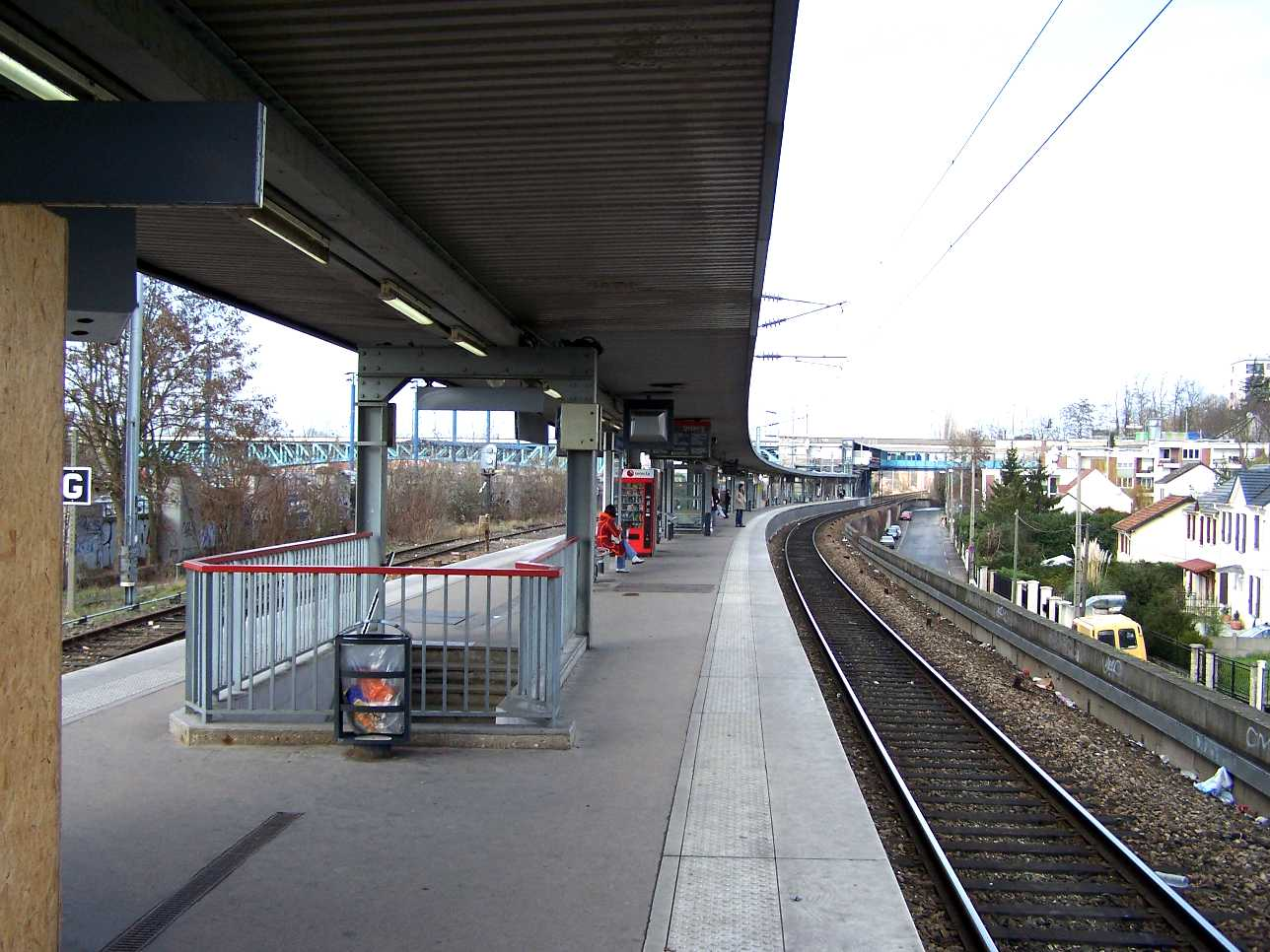

General information
- Location: Rue d'Andrésy; 78700 Conflans-Sainte-Honorine; France
- Owner: SNCF
- Manager: SNCF
- Platforms: 1 central(RER); 2 latéraux (Transilien)

Other information
- Fare zone: Zone 5

Passengers
- 2024: 7,385,500

Services
Preceding station	RER	Following station
Neuville-Université towards Cergy-le-Haut	RER A	Achères-Ville towards Marne-la-Vallée–Chessy
Preceding station	Transilien	Following station
Conflans-Sainte-Honorine towards Paris-St.-Lazare	Line J	Maurecourt towards Ermont–Eaubonne, Gisors, Mantes-la-Jolie or Vernon
Neuville-Université towards Cergy-le-Haut	Line L	Achères-Ville towards Mantes-la-Jolie
Location

Conflans–Fin d'Oise is a French rail station located in Conflans-Sainte-Honorine, in the departement of the Yvelines, in Île-de-France.

== Location ==
Conflans-Fin-d'Oise is a particular railway station, as a two-level station, Conflans-Fin-d'Oise is served by trains of the RER A and Transilien Line L in the low-level station, and by trains of the Transilien Line J in the high-level station, their location follows as:

- The first-level station is established at an altitude of 31 meters, and located at kilometric point (PK) 26.412 of the Achères–Pontoise line, between the stations Achères-Ville and Neuville-Université.
- The second-level station is established at an altitude of 40 meters, and located at kilometric point (PK) 25.744 of the Paris-Saint-Lazare–Mantes-la-Jolie line (via Conflans-Sainte-Honorine), between the stations Maurecourt and Conflans-Sainte-Honorine.

== Attendance ==
The lower station (RER A and Transilien L) of Conflans-Fin-d'Oise welcomed nearly 9,500 passengers per day in 2009.

In 2012, 1860 passengers took the train to the train station (Transilien J) every week.

From 2015 to 2024, according to SNCF estimates, the annual passenger traffic at the station amounted to the figures indicated in the table below:

Year	2015	2016	2017	2018	2019	2020	2021	2022	2023	2024
Passengers	5,483,634	5,490,546	5,463,185	5,328,451	5,226,077	2,651,640	4,522,551	6,673,880	6,697,282	7,385,500

== Connections ==
=== Train service ===
As a two-level station, the train service situation follows as:

- The first level is served by trains of the RER A towards Cergy-le-Haut and Boissy-Saint-Léger or Marne-la-Vallée – Chessy, and trains of the Transilien Line L towards Cergy-le-Haut and Paris-Saint-Lazare.
- The second level is served by trains of the Transilien Line J towards Mantes-la-Jolie, Pontoise or Gisors and Paris-Saint-Lazare.

=== Bus connections ===
The station is also served by many bus lines:

- Cergy-Pontoise Confluence: 1227 1234 1237 1257
- Mantois: 5441
- Poissy - Les Mureaux: 6517 6519 6540 6559 6572 6574
- Noctilien: N152 N155

== Gallery ==
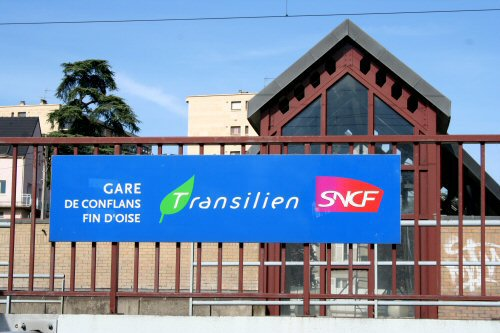
Station Conflans-Fin-d'Oise.

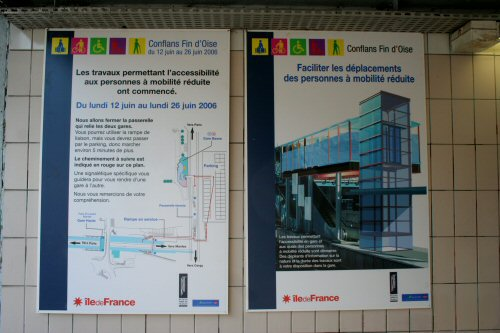
Accessibility works at Conflans-Fin-d'Oise station.

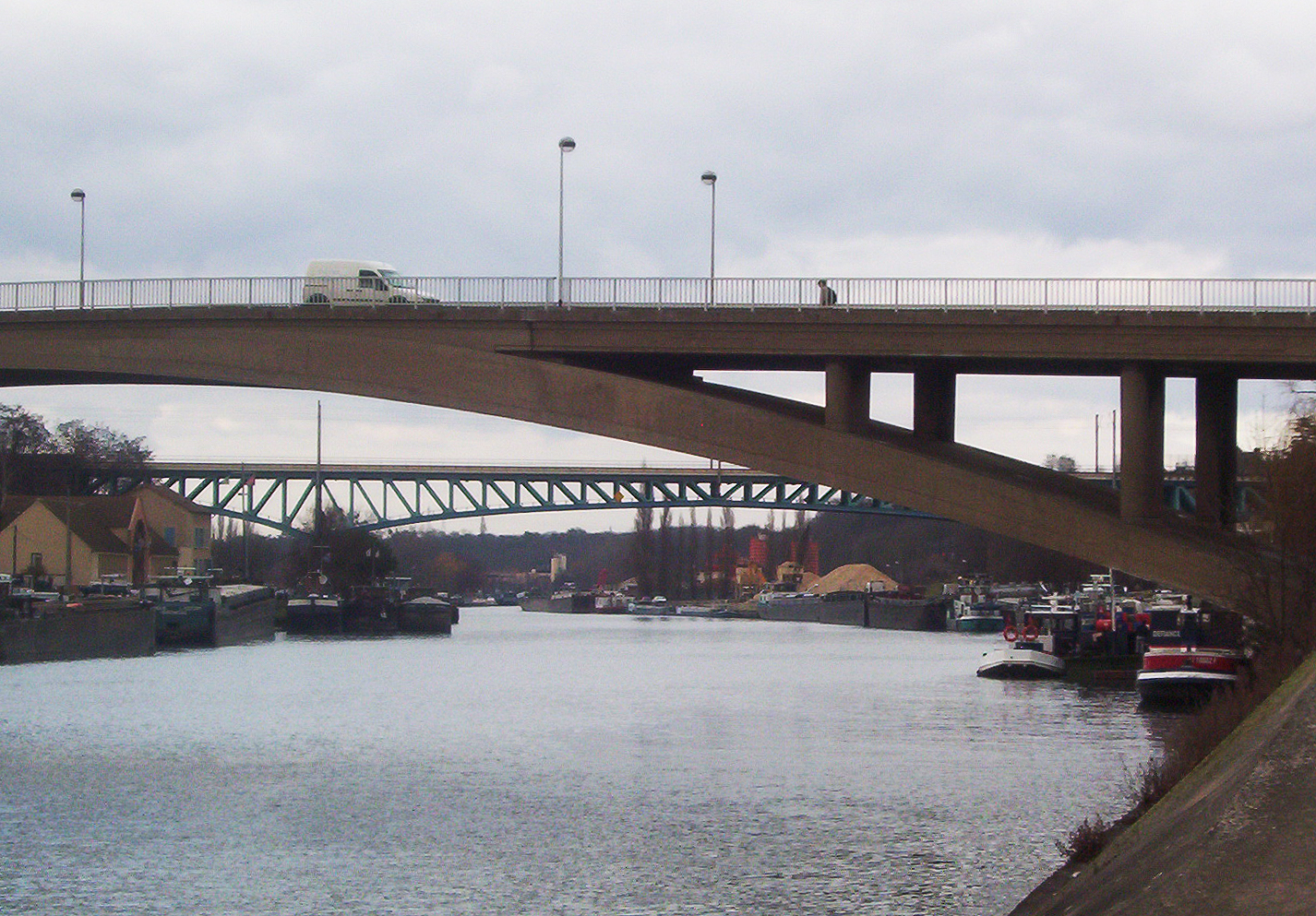
Bridges over the Oise, road in the foreground, and railway, in the background, the latter on the Paris - Mantes line by Conflans.

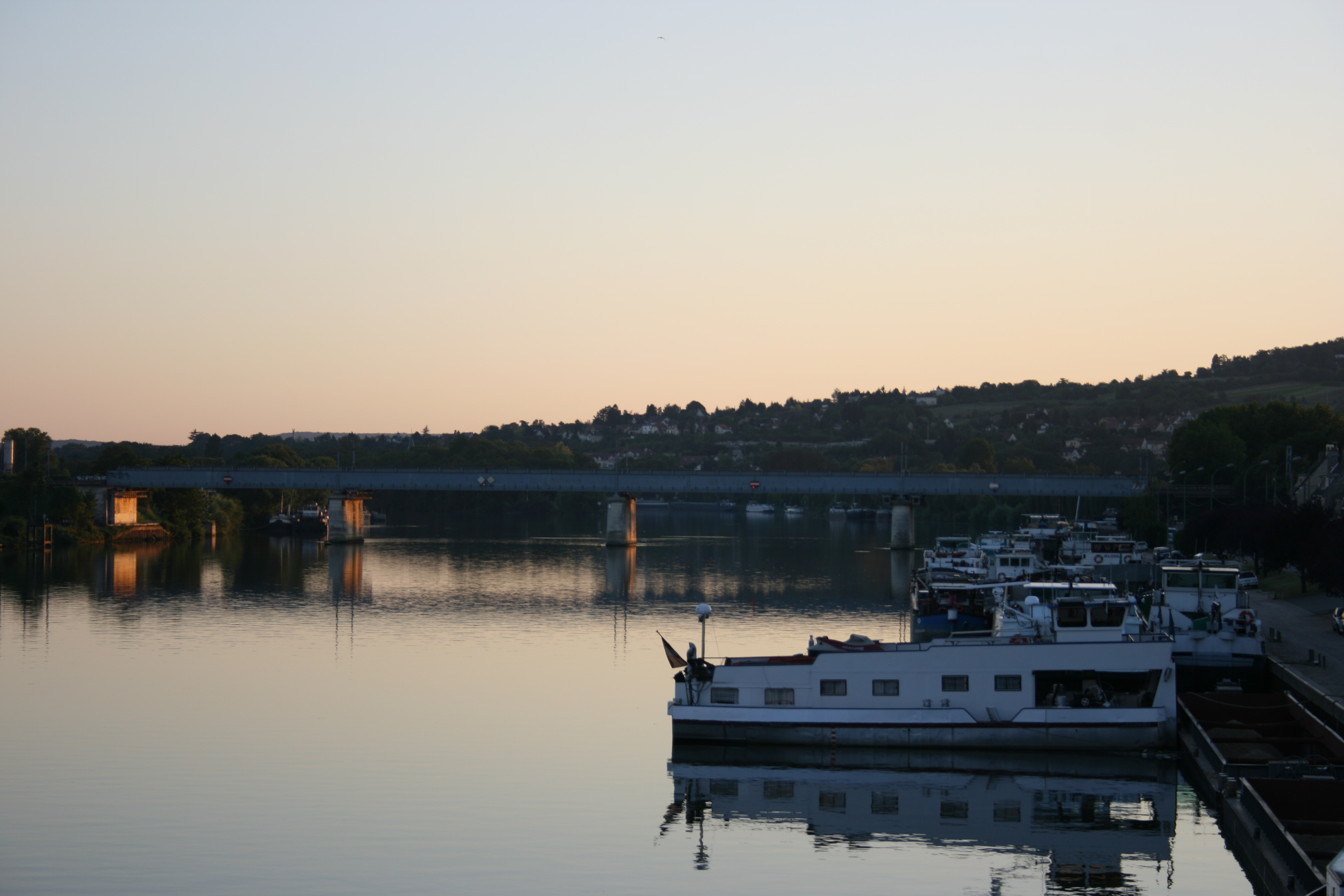
The railway bridge of the Achères - Pontoise line, used by RER A trains.

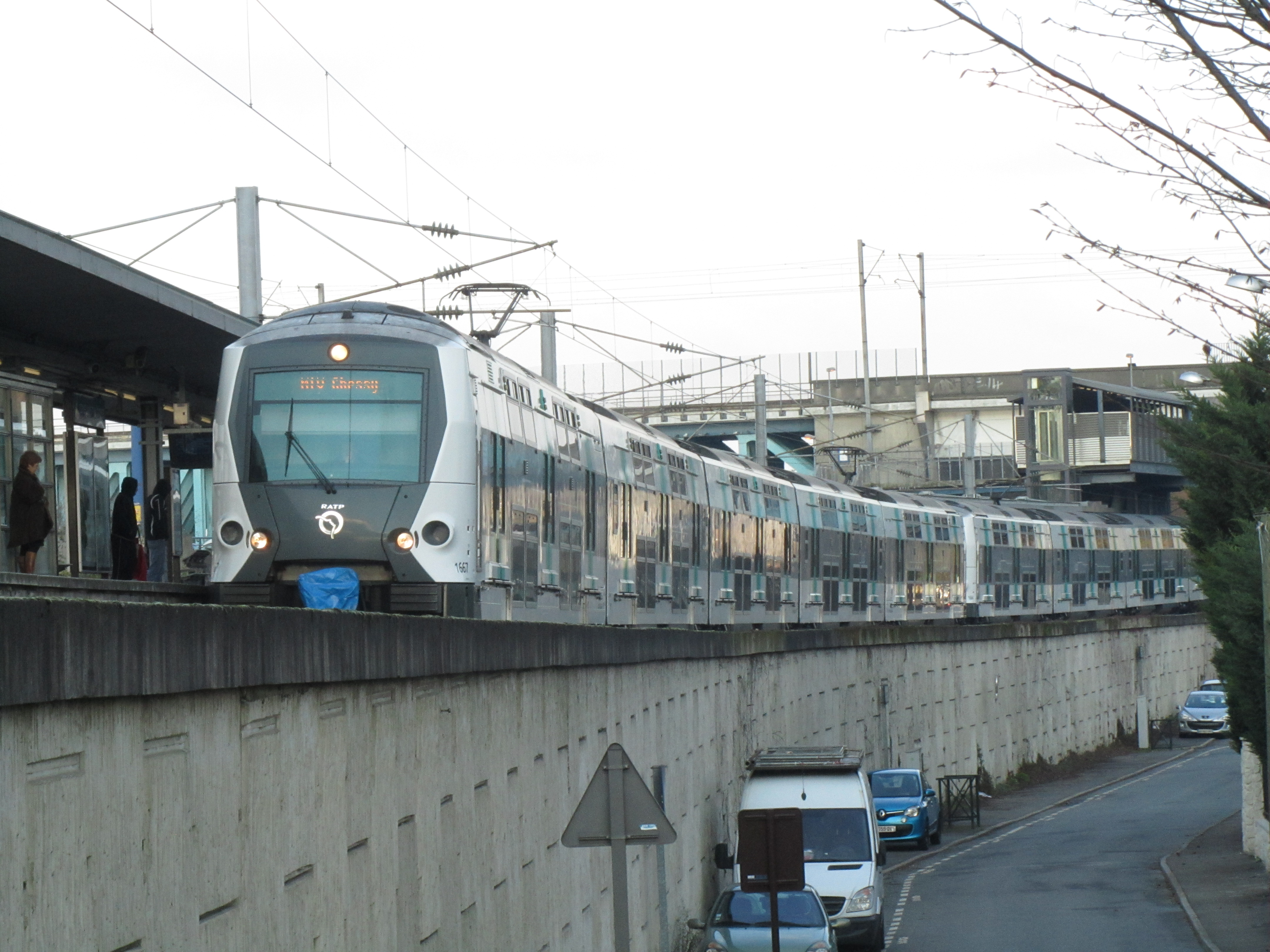
Train MI 09 of the RER A at the low station of Conflans-Fin-d'Oise.

== See also ==
- List of stations of the Paris RER
- RER A
- Transilien Paris-Saint-Lazare
