= Cergy-Préfecture station =

Railway station in Cergy, France

Cergy-Préfecture
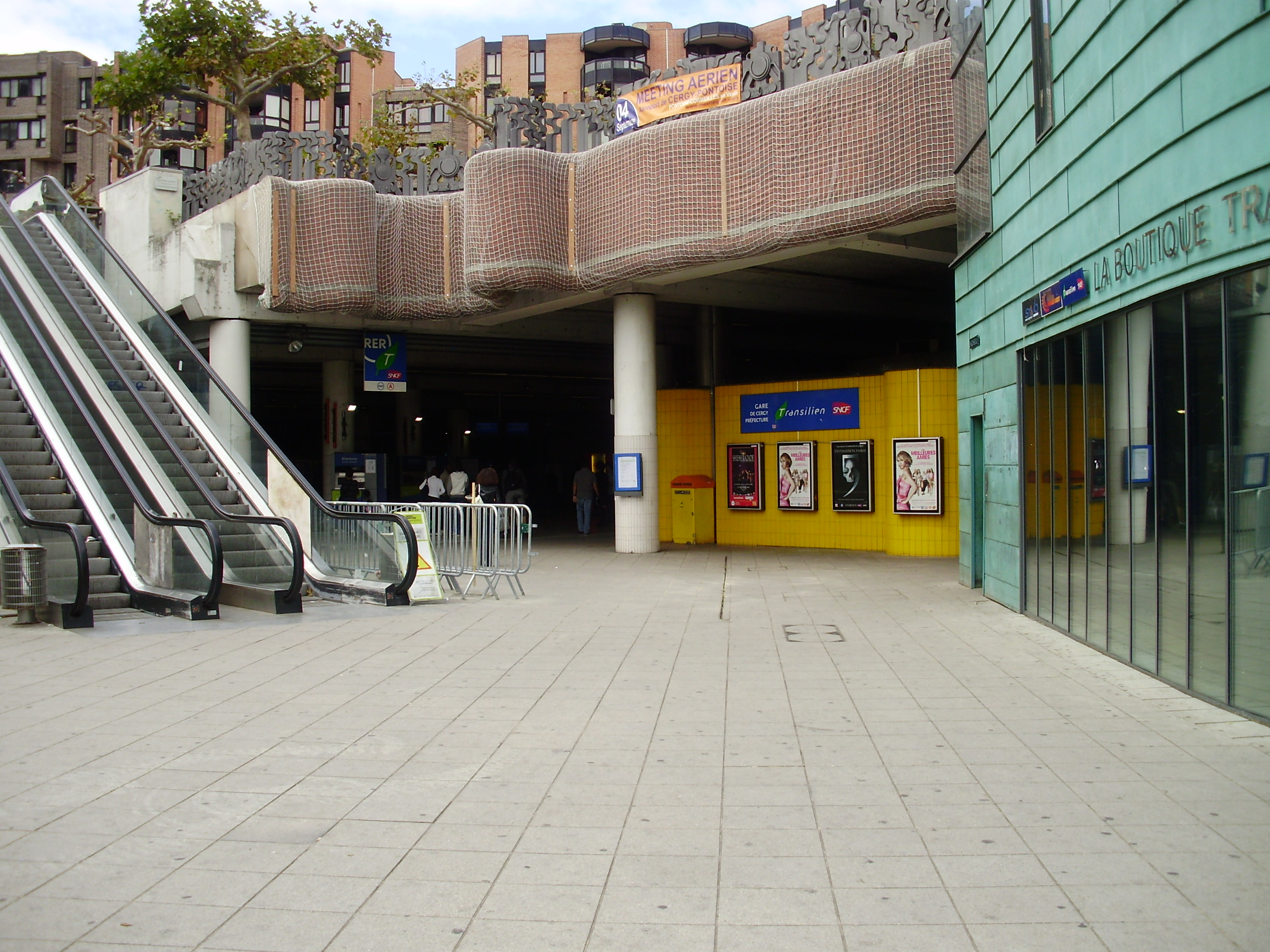
- Entrance to Cergy-Préfecture station

General information
- Location: Boulevard de l'Oise; 95800 Cergy; France
- Coordinates: 49°02′10″N 2°04′48″E
- Operator: SNCF
- Platforms: 1 island platform
- Tracks: 2

Construction
- Structure type: Underground
- Accessible: Yes, by prior reservation

Other information
- Station code: 87381905
- Fare zone: 5

History
- Opened: 31 March 1979

Passengers
- 2024: 14,025,717

Services
Preceding station	RER	Following station
Cergy-Saint-Christophe towards Cergy-le-Haut	RER A	Neuville-Université towards Marne-la-Vallée–Chessy
Preceding station	Transilien	Following station
Cergy-Saint-Christophe towards Cergy-le-Haut	Line L	Neuville-Université towards Paris–Saint Lazare
Location

Cergy-Préfecture is a railway station in Cergy, in the departement of the Val-d'Oise, France. The station was opened on 31 March 1979 and receives trains from Paris-Saint-Lazare as well as the RER A.

The station is underground and has two platforms. The entire area above and around the station is built up and the département council has its offices next to the station (hence the station's name). The station is at the heart of a transport interchange at level -1 with the bus station at ground level. Level 1 is a large concrete slab plaza with shops and living apartments.

Cergy–Préfecture only has two platforms, with the platform situated between both tracks. Walls at platform level were painted with graffiti with messages of peace to discourage vandals. The general ambiance of the station is rather dark, but secure but CCTV monitoring the interchange.

Rail services link Cergy to Cergy-le-Haut and the Western Paris suburbs. Buses serve the ville nouvelle and particularly Pontoise and the rest of Val-d'Oise département.

== Location ==
The station is established at kilometric point (PK) 32.830 of the Neuville–Cergy-Préfecture line, between the stations Cergy-Saint-Christophe and Neuville-Université.

== Attendance ==
From 2015 to 2024, according to SNCF estimates, the annual passenger traffic at the station amounted to the figures indicated in the table below:

Year	2015	2016	2017	2018	2019	2020	2021	2022	2023	2024
Passengers	11,996,226	12,213,175	12,347,999	12,279,673	12,236,286	5,992,100	8,443,663	12,677,261	12,719,391	14,025,717

== Connections ==
=== Train service ===
The station is served by trains of RER A towards Cergy-le-Haut and Boissy-Saint-Léger or Marne-la-Vallée – Chessy, and trains of Transilien Line L towards Cergy-le-Haut and Paris-Saint-Lazare.

During rush hours, there are one train of RER A and Transilien Line L each 10 minutes.

=== Bus connections ===
==== Île-de-France ====
The station is connected by many lines from different networks organized by Île-de-France Mobilités:

- Vexin: 1101, 1102, 1103, 1110, 1112, 1143, 9513, 9514
- Cergy-Pontoise Confluence: 1201 1202 1207 1208 1224 1226 1228 1229 1230 1232 1236 1238 1241 1242
- Haut Val-d'Oise: 1317 9518
- Val Parisis: 1410, 1412, 1420, 1430
- Lignes Île-de-France Ouest: 7802, 7808, 7216
- Mantois: 5409
- Poissy - Les Mureaux: 6541
- Noctilien: N150 N152

==== Hauts-de-France ====
The station is also served by many bus lines from Réseau interurbain de l'Oise, a bus network operated by Hauts-de-France Mobilités:

- Réseau interurbain de l'Oise: 603, 604, 609

== See also ==
- List of stations of the Paris RER
- List of Transilien stations
