= Neuville-Université station =

Railway station in Neuville-sur-Oise, France

Coordinates: 49.0139°N 2.0783°E

Neuville-Université
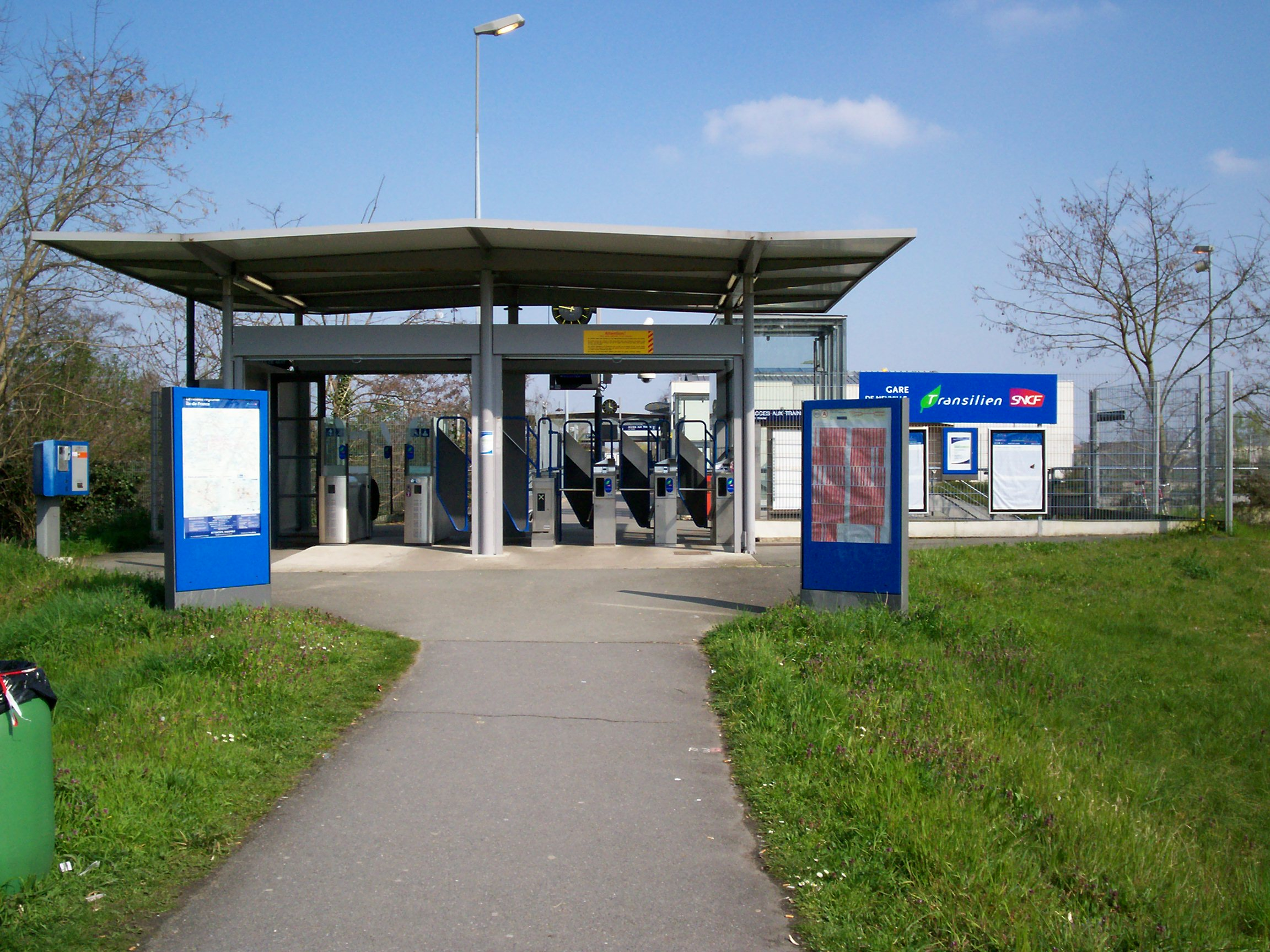
- Entrance of the station

General information
- System: RER and Transilien station
- Owner: SNCF
- Line: Line L RER A

Other information
- Station code: 87334482
- Fare zone: 5

History
- Opened: 28 August 1994; 31 years ago

Passengers
- 2024: 3,657,949

Services
Preceding station	RER	Following station
Cergy-Préfecture towards Cergy-le-Haut	RER A	Conflans-Fin-d'Oise towards Marne-la-Vallée–Chessy
Preceding station	Transilien	Following station
Cergy-Préfecture towards Cergy-le-Haut	Line L	Conflans-Fin-d'Oise towards Paris–Saint Lazare
Location

Neuville-Université is a train station in Neuville-sur-Oise, in Val d'Oise department, in France.

== History ==
In 1988, RER line A was extended from Nanterre Préfecture to Cergy-St-Christophe. Neuville–Université station was created on this line in 1994.

== Service ==
=== Train ===
The station is served by RER line A, with a train every 10 minutes toward Cergy-le-Haut and toward Marne-la-Vallée.

It is also served during peak hours by Transilien Line L, with a train every 10 minutes toward Cergy-le-Haut and toward Paris St Lazare.

=== Bus connections ===
- Cergy-Pontoise Confluence : Cergy-Pontoise Confluence: 1203 1208 1229 1233 1237
- Lignes IDF Ouest : 7802, 7816
- Noctilien : N152
