= Pierrelaye station =

Railway station in Pierrelaye, France

Coordinates: 49.019392°N 2.153672°E

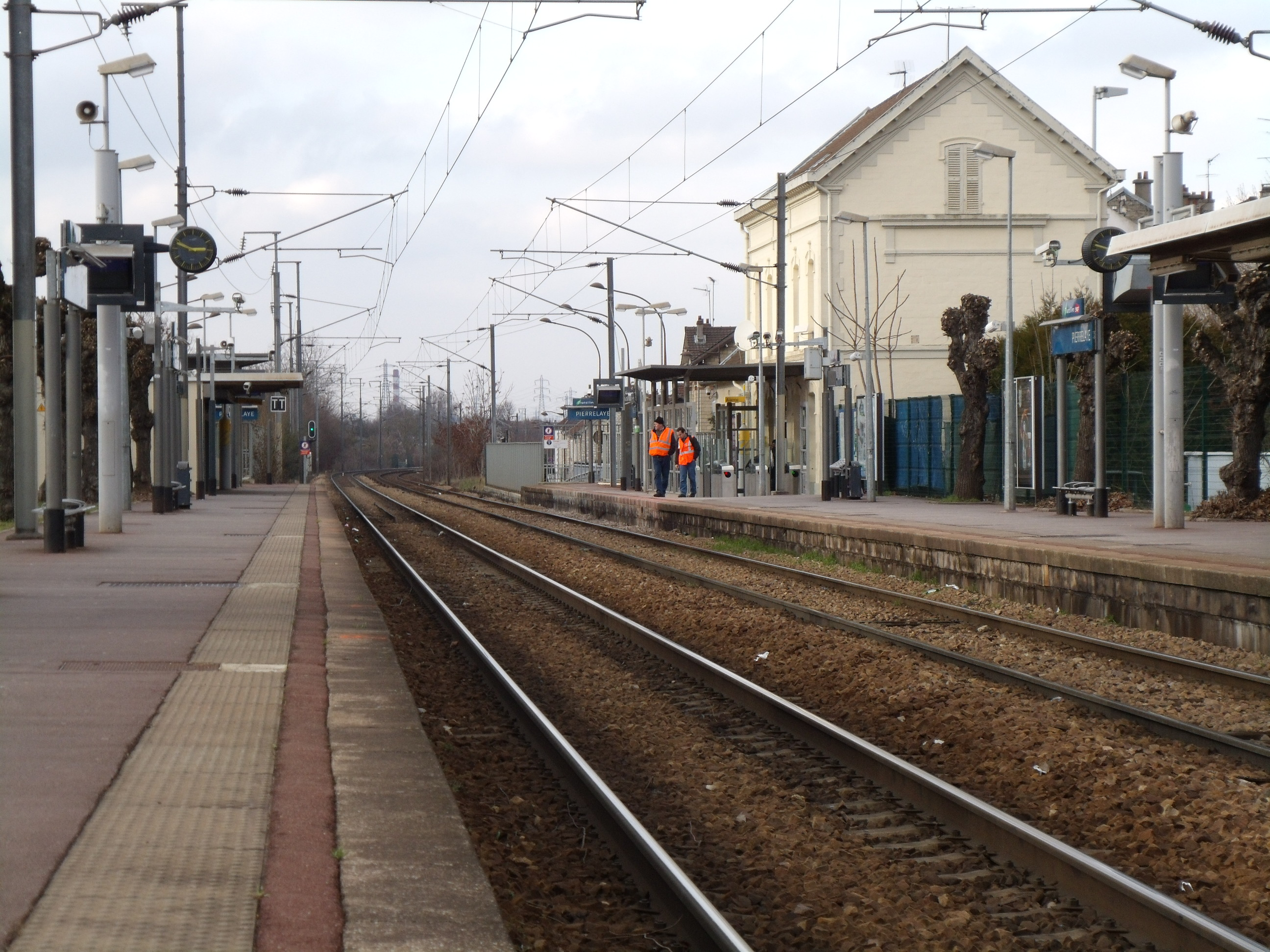
The station and the tracks toward Pontoise

Pierrelaye (French pronunciation: [pjɛʁlɛ]) is a railway station in the town of Pierrelaye, a northwestern suburb of Paris, France. It is served by Transilien regional trains from Paris to Pontoise, and by RER rapid transit.

== See also ==
- List of stations of the Paris RER

Preceding station	Transilien	Following station
Montigny–Beauchamp towards Paris-Nord	Line H	Saint-Ouen-l'Aumône-Liesse towards Pontoise
Preceding station	RER	Following station
Saint-Ouen-l'Aumône-Liesse towards Pontoise	RER C	Montigny–Beauchamp towards Massy-Palaiseau, Dourdan-la-Forêt or Saint-Martin-d'Étampes
