= Conflans-Sainte-Honorine station =

Railway station in Conflans-Sainte-Honorine, Île-de-France

Conflans-Sainte-Honorine
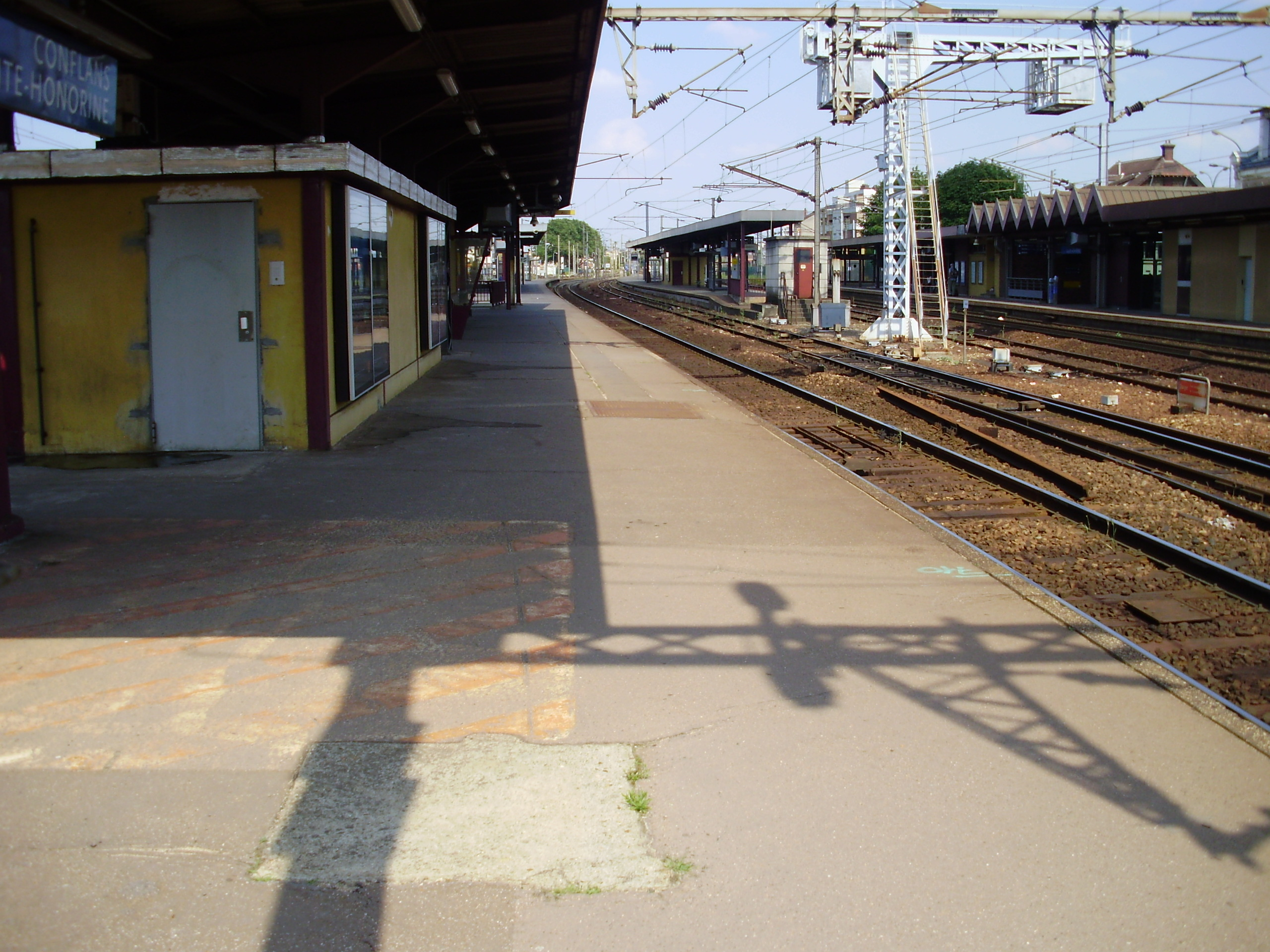
- Platforms of the station

General information
- Location: 2 ter, rue Eugène-Berrurier; 78700 Conflans-Sainte-Honorine; France
- Coordinates: 48°59′49″N 2°05′54″E
- Owner: SNCF
- Operator: SNCF
- Platforms: 2 platforms
- Tracks: 2

Construction
- Accessible: Yes, by prior reservation

Other information
- Station code: 87381897
- Fare zone: 5

History
- Opened: 1 June 1892

Passengers
- 2024: 4,582,103

Services
Preceding station	Transilien	Following station
Herblay towards Paris-St.-Lazare	Line J	Conflans-Fin-d'Oise towards Mantes-la-Jolie
Herblay towards Paris-St.-Lazare	Line J	Éragny–Neuville towards Pontoise or Gisors
Location

Conflans-Sainte-Honorine is a French railway station in Conflans-Sainte-Honorine, a northwestern suburb of Paris, France.

== Location ==
The station is located at kilometric point (PK) 24.570 of the Paris-Saint-Lazare–Mantes-la-Jolie line (via Conflans-Sainte-Honorine).

== Attendance ==
From 2015 to 2024, according to SNCF estimates, the annual passenger traffic at the station amounted to the figures indicated in the table below:

Year	2015	2016	2017	2018	2019	2020	2021	2022	2023	2024
Passengers	4,442,590	4,624,289	4,748,100	4,779,174	4,834,179	2,347,335	3,693,330	4,070,670	4,154,142	4,582,103

== Services ==
=== Train service ===
The station is served by trains of the Transilien Line J from Paris-Saint-Lazare to Pontoise or Gisors (branch to Pontoise), or Mantes-la-Jolie (branch to Mantes-la-Jolie).

=== Bus connections ===
The station is also served by many bus lines:

- Cergy-Pontoise Confluence: 1204 1205 1225 1227 1231 1234 1255 1257
- Mantois: 5441
- Lignes Île-de-France Ouest: 7816
- Noctilien: N152 N155

== See also ==
- List of Transilien stations
