= Achères-Ville station =

Railway station in Achères, France

Coordinates: 48.9700°N 2.0775°E

Achères-Ville
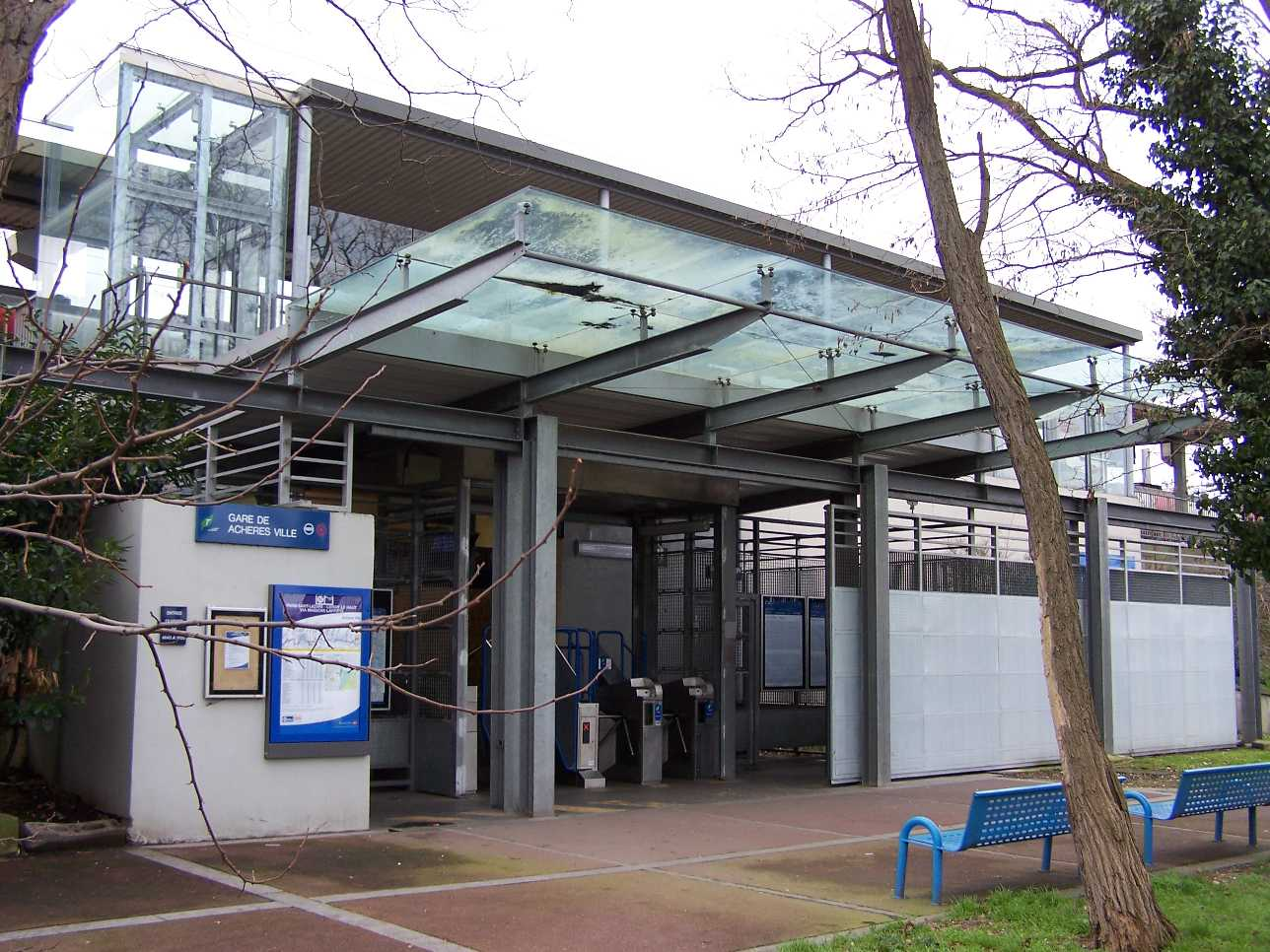
- Station entrance

General information
- Location: Avenue Jean Moulin; 78260 Achères
- Owner: SNCF
- Line: RER A Line L
- Platforms: 2

Other information
- Station code: 87381657
- Fare zone: 5

History
- Opened: 1976; 50 years ago

Passengers
- 2024: 4,073,480

Services
Preceding station	RER	Following station
Conflans-Fin-d'Oise towards Cergy-le-Haut	RER A	Maisons-Laffitte towards Marne-la-Vallée–Chessy
Preceding station	Transilien	Following station
Conflans-Fin-d'Oise towards Cergy-le-Haut	Line L	Maisons-Laffitte towards Paris–Saint Lazare
Location

Achères-Ville is a French railway station in Achères commune, in Yvelines département, Île-de-France region.

== Location ==
The station is at kilometric point 23.594 of Achères-Pontoise railway. Its altitude is 30 m (98 ft).

== History ==
The station was put in operation in May 1976 to bring rail transport closer to the town. Until then Achères was only served by Achères–Grand-Cormier station, on Paris–Le Havre railway, located 2 km (1.24 mi) from the city center. This situation was due to the destruction of Village d'Achères station (on Achères–Pontoise railway), which was closer, but destroyed by bombings during the night from 7–8 June 1944, and never set in service again.

== The station ==
The additional word Ville prevents confusion with Achères–Grand-Cormier station.

The station has two lateral platforms, A and B, whose length is 220 meters.

== Service ==
=== Train service ===
Achères-Ville station is served by:

- One train every 10 minutes during workweek days, 1 train every 20 minutes on Saturdays and Sundays, 1 train every 30 minutes in the evenings on RER line A, toward Cergy-le-Haut or Paris and eastern suburbs
- One train every 10 minutes during peak hours on Transilien Line L, toward Cergy-le-Haut or Paris-Saint-Lazare

=== Connections ===
The station is served by the following bus routes :

- Cergy-Pontoise Confluence : Cergy-Pontoise Confluence: 1204 1205 1221 1222 1255
- Noctilien : N152
