= Maurecourt station =

Railway station in Andrésy, France

Maurecourt
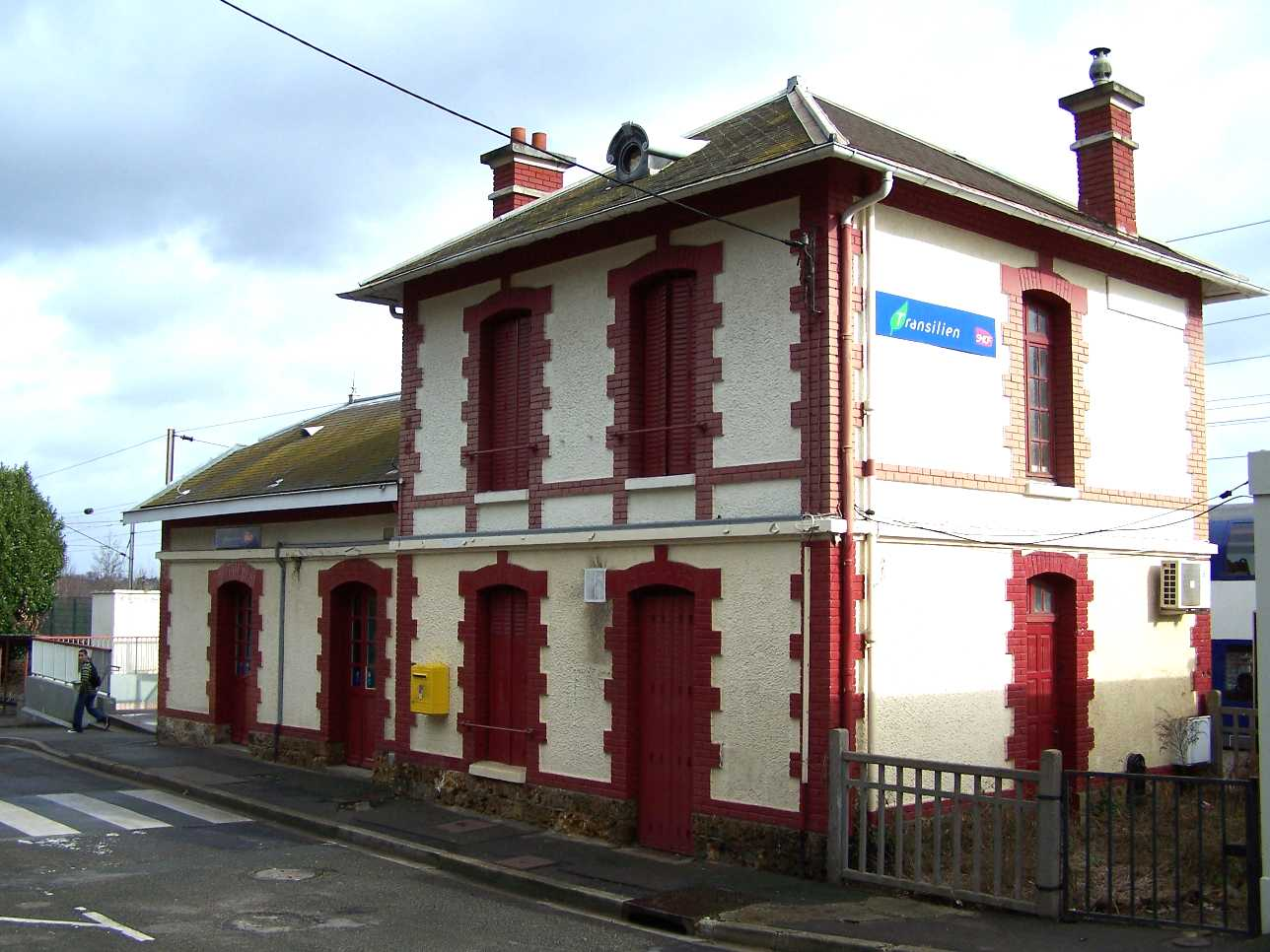
- Passenger building of the station

General information
- Location: Rue de Bel-Air; 78570 Andrésy; France
- Coordinates: 48°59′14″N 2°03′36″E
- Owner: SNCF
- Operator: SNCF
- Platforms: 2 platforms
- Tracks: 2

Construction
- Accessible: Yes, by prior reservation

Other information
- Station code: 87381483
- Fare zone: 5

History
- Opened: 1 June 1892

Passengers
- 2023: 654,948

Services
Preceding station	Transilien	Following station
Conflans-Fin-d'Oise towards Paris-St.-Lazare	Line J	Andrésy towards Ermont–Eaubonne, Gisors, Mantes-la-Jolie or Vernon
Location

Maurecourt is a French rail station of the Paris-Saint-Lazare–Mantes-Station line (via Conflans-Sainte-Honorine) located in Andrésy, in the departement of the Yvelines, in Île-de-France.

The station is operated by the SNCF (Société nationale des chemins de fer français) and served by trains of the Transilien Line J.

== Location ==
The station is established at an altitude of 44 meters and located at kilometric point (PK) 27.751 of Paris–Mantes-Station line (via Conflans-Sainte-Honorine).

== History ==
The station opened on June 1, 1892.

== Attendance ==
From 2015 to 2023, according to SNCF estimates, the annual passenger traffic at the station amounted to the figures indicated in the table below:

Year	2015	2016	2017	2018	2019	2020	2021	2022	2023
Passengers	573,999	575,732	562,963	539,598	519,455	251,355	601,326	665,925	654,946

== Service ==
=== Train service ===
The station is served by trains of the Transilien Line J.

=== Connections ===
The station is served by the following bus lines:

- Mantois: 5409
- Poissy - Les Mureaux: 6517 6541 6572 6591
- Noctilien: N155

== See also ==
- List of Transilien stations
