= Andrésy station =

Railway station in Andrésy, France

Andrésy
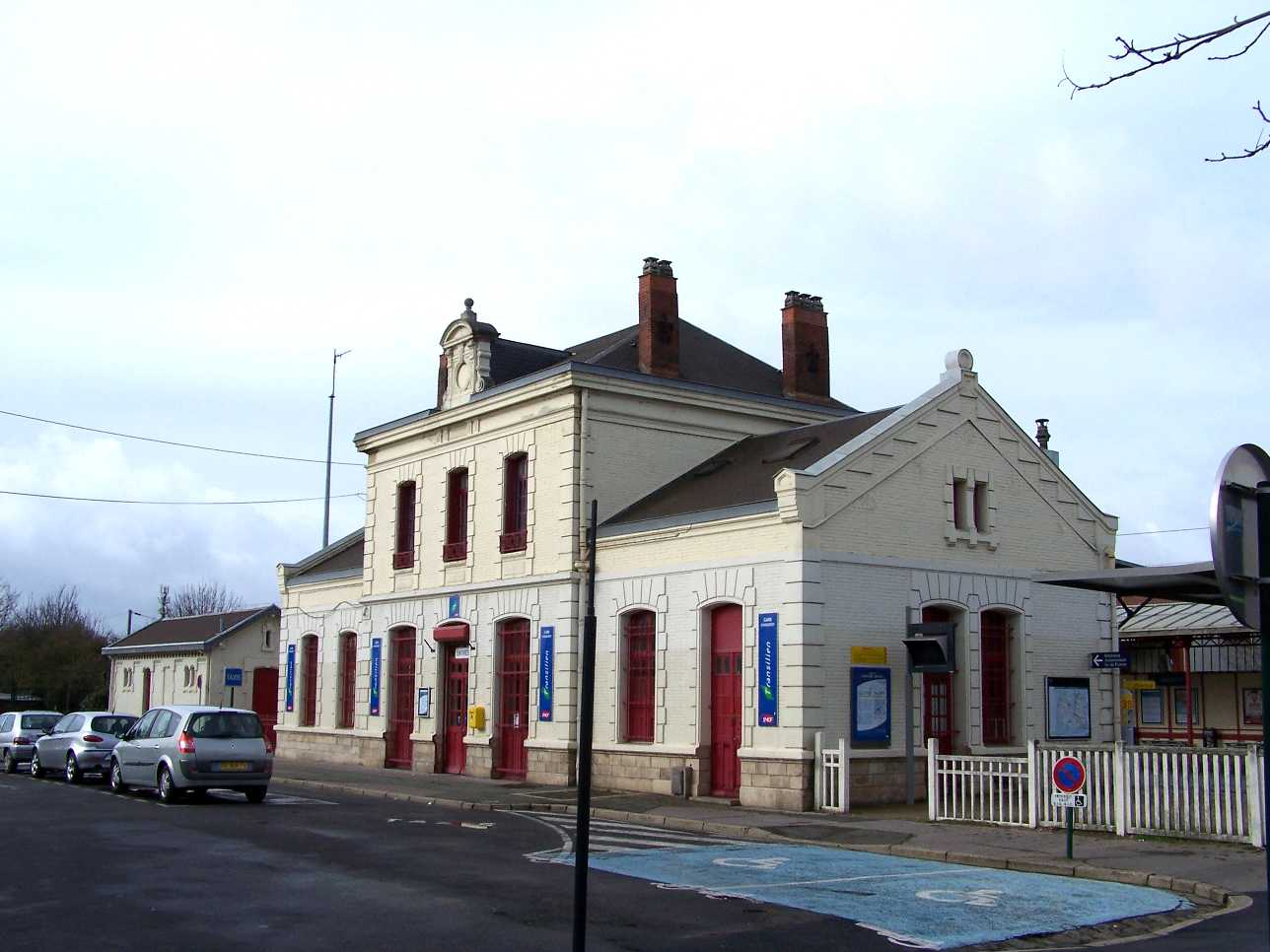
- Passenger building of the station

General information
- Location: Place de la Gare; 78570 Andrésy; France
- Coordinates: 48°58′29″N 2°02′57″E
- Owner: SNCF
- Operator: SNCF
- Platforms: 2 platforms
- Tracks: 2

Construction
- Accessible: Yes, by prior reservation

Other information
- Station code: 87381491
- Fare zone: 5

History
- Opened: 1 June 1892

Passengers
- 2023: 579,152

Services
| Preceding station | Transilien | Following station |
|---|---|---|
| Maurecourt towards Paris-St.-Lazare | Line J | Chanteloup-les-Vignes towards Ermont–Eaubonne, Gisors, Mantes-la-Jolie or Vernon |
Location

Andrésy is a French rail station of the Paris-Saint-Lazare–Mantes-Station line (via Conflans-Sainte-Honorine) located in Andrésy, in the departement of the Yvelines, in Île-de-France.

The station is operated by the SNCF (Société nationale des chemins de fer français) and served by trains of the Transilien Line J.

== Location ==
The station is established at an altitude of 53 meters and located at kilometric point (PK) 29.353 of Paris–Mantes-Station line (via Conflans-Sainte-Honorine).

== History ==
The station opened on June 1, 1892.

== Attendance ==
From 2015 to 2024, according to SNCF estimates, the annual passenger traffic at the station amounted to the figures indicated in the table below:

| Year | 2015 | 2016 | 2017 | 2018 | 2019 | 2020 | 2021 | 2022 | 2023 | 2024 |
|---|---|---|---|---|---|---|---|---|---|---|
| Passengers | 583,871 | 623,470 | 563,440 | 499,012 | 445,551 | 205,140 | 516,688 | 586,872 | 579,152 | 638,477 |

== Service ==
=== Train service ===
The station is served by trains of the Transilien Line J.

=== Connections ===
The station is served by the following bus lines:

- Mantois: 5441
- Poissy - Les Mureaux: 6540 6559 6574 6591
- Noctilien: N155

== See also ==
- List of Transilien stations
