= Saint-Ouen-l'Aumône station =

Railway station in Saint-Ouen-l'Aumône, France

Coordinates: 49.045°N 2.106°E

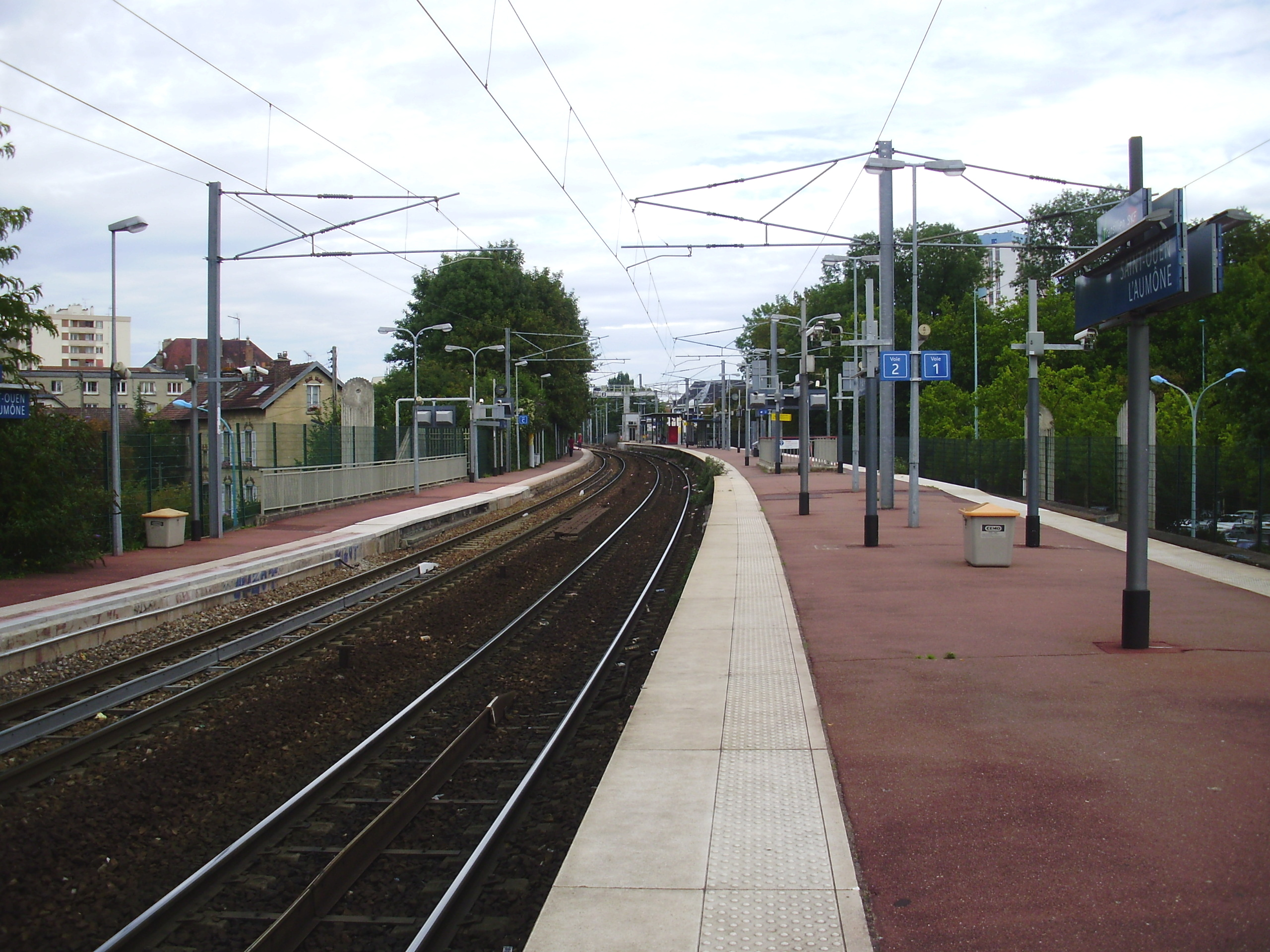
Platforms

Saint-Ouen-l'Aumône is a railway station in Saint-Ouen-l'Aumône, a northwestern suburb of Paris, France. It is served by Transilien regional trains from Paris to Pontoise and from Pontoise to Creil, and by RER rapid transit.

== See also ==
- List of stations of the Paris RER

Preceding station	Transilien	Following station
Saint-Ouen-l'Aumône-Liesse towards Paris-Nord	Line H	Pontoise Terminus
Pontoise Terminus	Line H	Épluches towards Creil
Preceding station	RER	Following station
Pontoise Terminus	RER C	Saint-Ouen-l'Aumône-Liesse towards Massy-Palaiseau, Dourdan-la-Forêt or Saint-Martin-d'Étampes
