= Hôtel de Ville, Saint-Ouen-l'Aumône =

Town hall in Saint-Ouen-l'Aumône, France

Hôtel de Ville
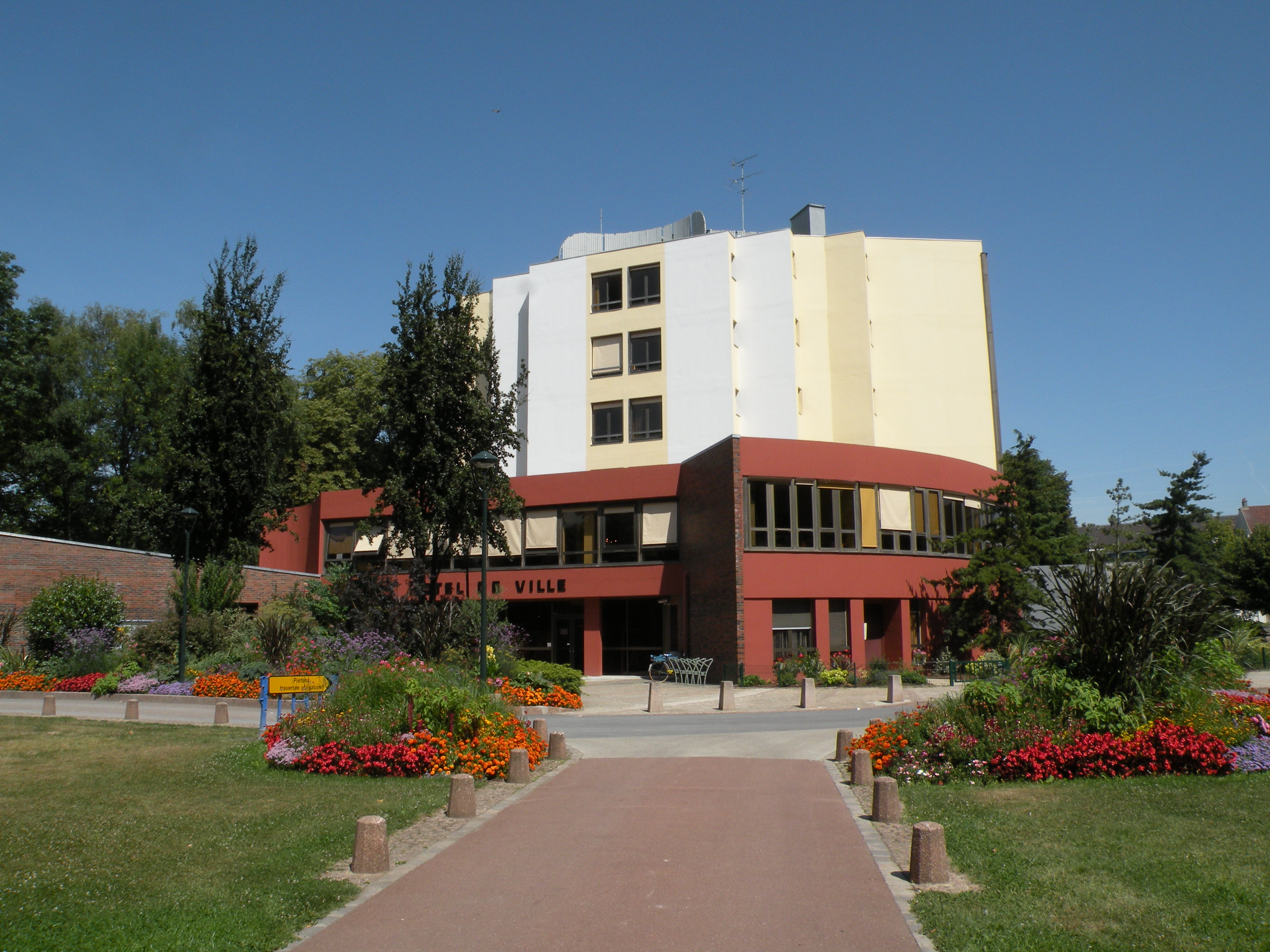
- The main frontage of the Hôtel de Ville in August 2009
- Interactive map of the Hôtel de Ville area

General information
- Type: City hall
- Architectural style: Modern style
- Location: Saint-Ouen-l'Aumône, France
- Coordinates: 49.0444°N 2.1062°E
- Completed: 1979

The Hôtel de Ville (French pronunciation: [otɛl də vil], City Hall) is a municipal building in Saint-Ouen-l'Aumône, Val-d'Oise, in the northwestern suburbs of Paris, standing on Place Pierre Mendès.

== History ==
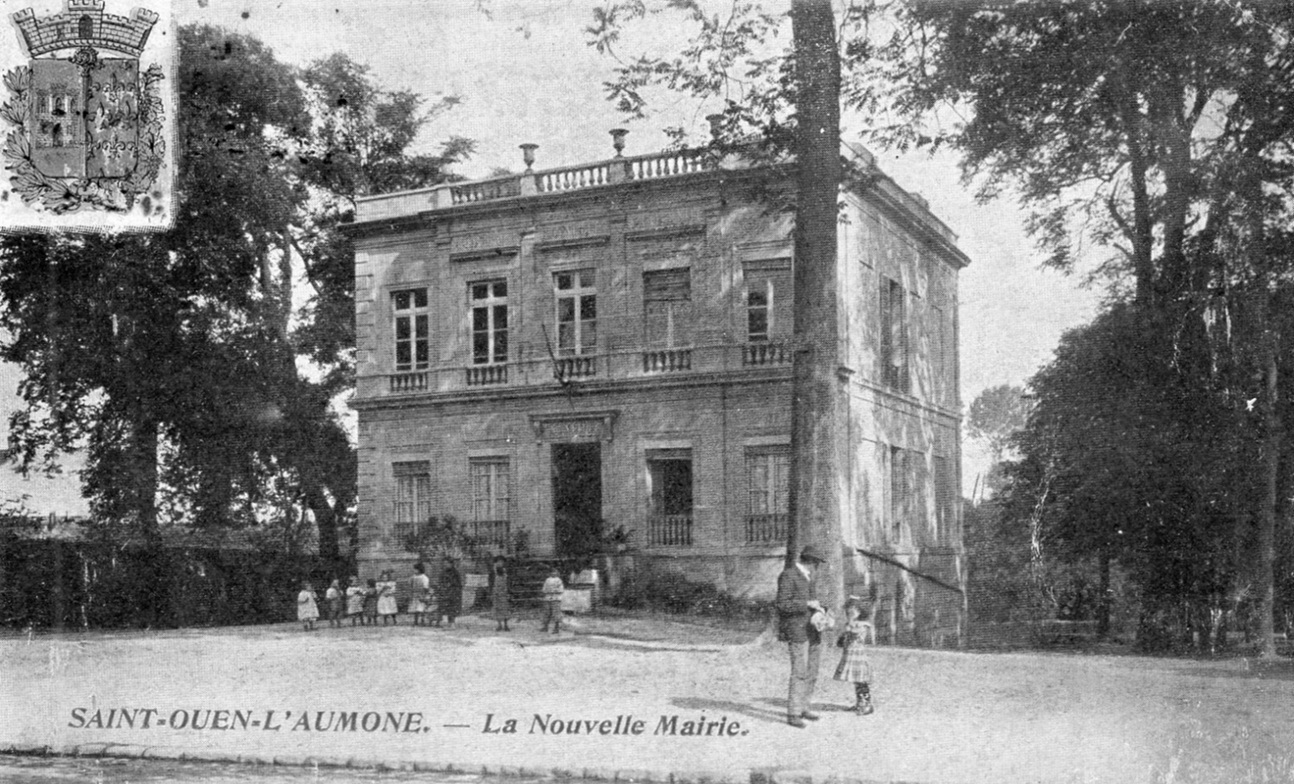
The old town hall

Following the French Revolution, the new town council initially met in the home of the mayor at the time. This arrangement continued until 1839 when a combined town hall and school was established in Place du Marché in the heart of the old town. The building was enlarged in 1875.

In the early 20th century, after the old building became dilapidated, the council decided to commission a new combined town hall and school. The site they selected, also in Place du Marché, was just opposite the earlier building. The new building was designed in the neoclassical style and built in ashlar stone. The design involved a symmetrical main frontage of five bays facing onto the street. The central bay featured a short flight of steps leading up to a square-headed doorway with a cornice. The rest of the building was fenestrated by casement windows on both floors. There were balustrades in front of the first-floor windows and the bays on the first floor were flanked by pilasters supporting a balustraded parapet which was surmounted by urns. In the first half of the 20th century the building was still known as "La Mairie" rather than "L'Hôtel de Ville" on account of the small size of the town which, at that time, was less than 5,000 inhabitants.

In the mid-1970s, following significant population growth, the council decided to demolish Rue Haute and most of the vestiges of the old town. They also decided to commission a series of modern buildings including a new town hall. The site they selected, on Place Pierre Mendès, was to the west of the previous building, close to the east bank of the River Oise. The project attracted considerable criticism from local people who considered that the proposed building was too large and too expensive. It was designed in the modern style, built in concrete and glass and was officially opened by the mayor, Alain Richard, on 10 March 1979.

The design involved a three-storey tower, which was painted white, sitting on a two storey podium, which was painted red. The main frontage, which was on the south side, involved a recessed glass entrance with columns supporting the upper floor of the structure, which was fenestrated by dark-framed windows. The side elevations of the podium swept away in a curve towards the back. Internally, the principal room was the Salle du Conseil (council chamber).

In September 2017, there was a demonstration in front of the town hall after the mayor, Alain Richard, changed parties from the Socialist Party to La République En Marche! Then, in June 2023, a man shot his wife and subsequently killed himself on the lawn in front of the town hall.
