= Saint-Ouen-l'Aumône-Liesse station =

Railway station in Saint-Ouen-l'Aumône, France

Coordinates: 49°02′03″N 2°07′40″E

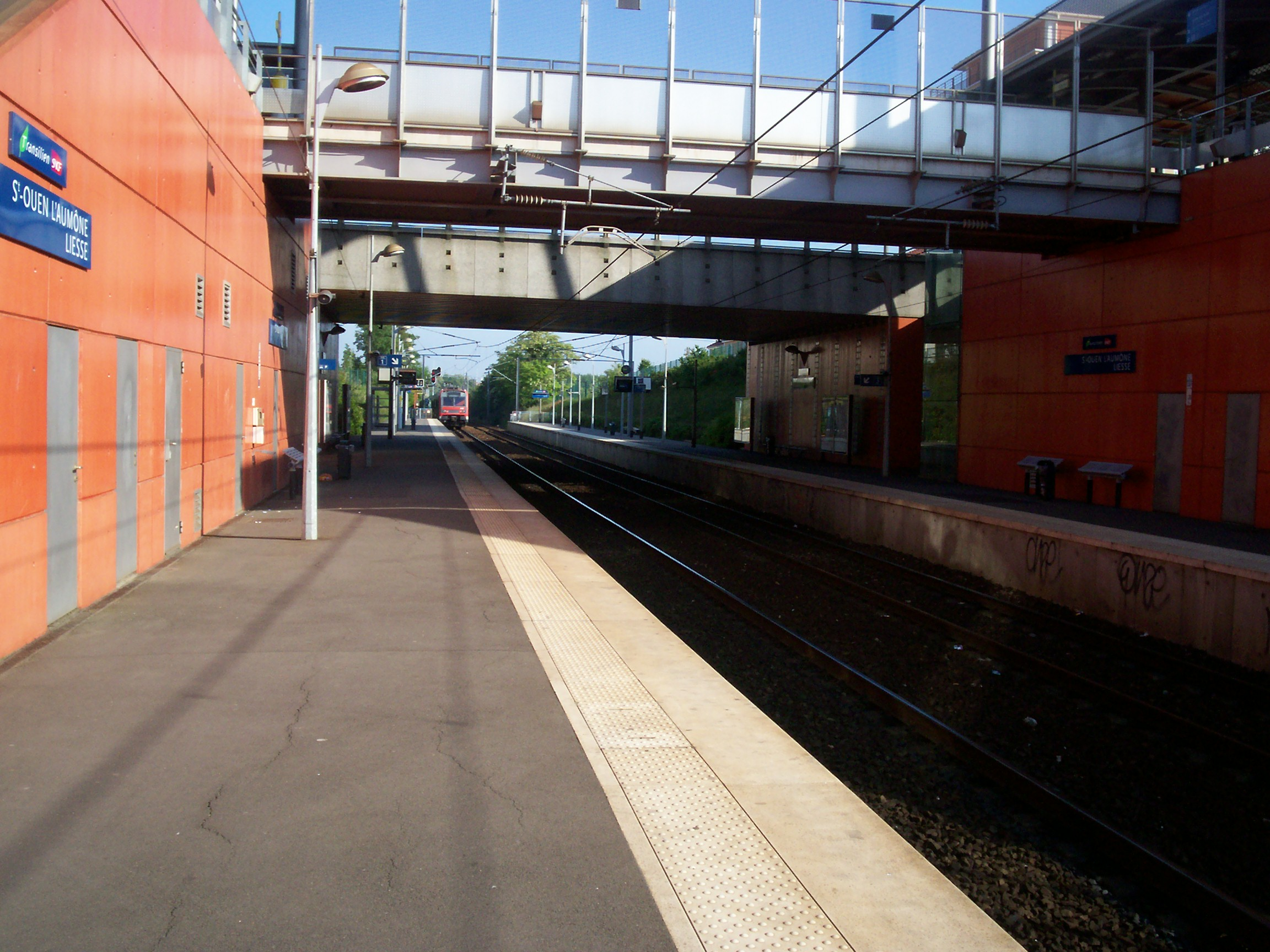
Platforms

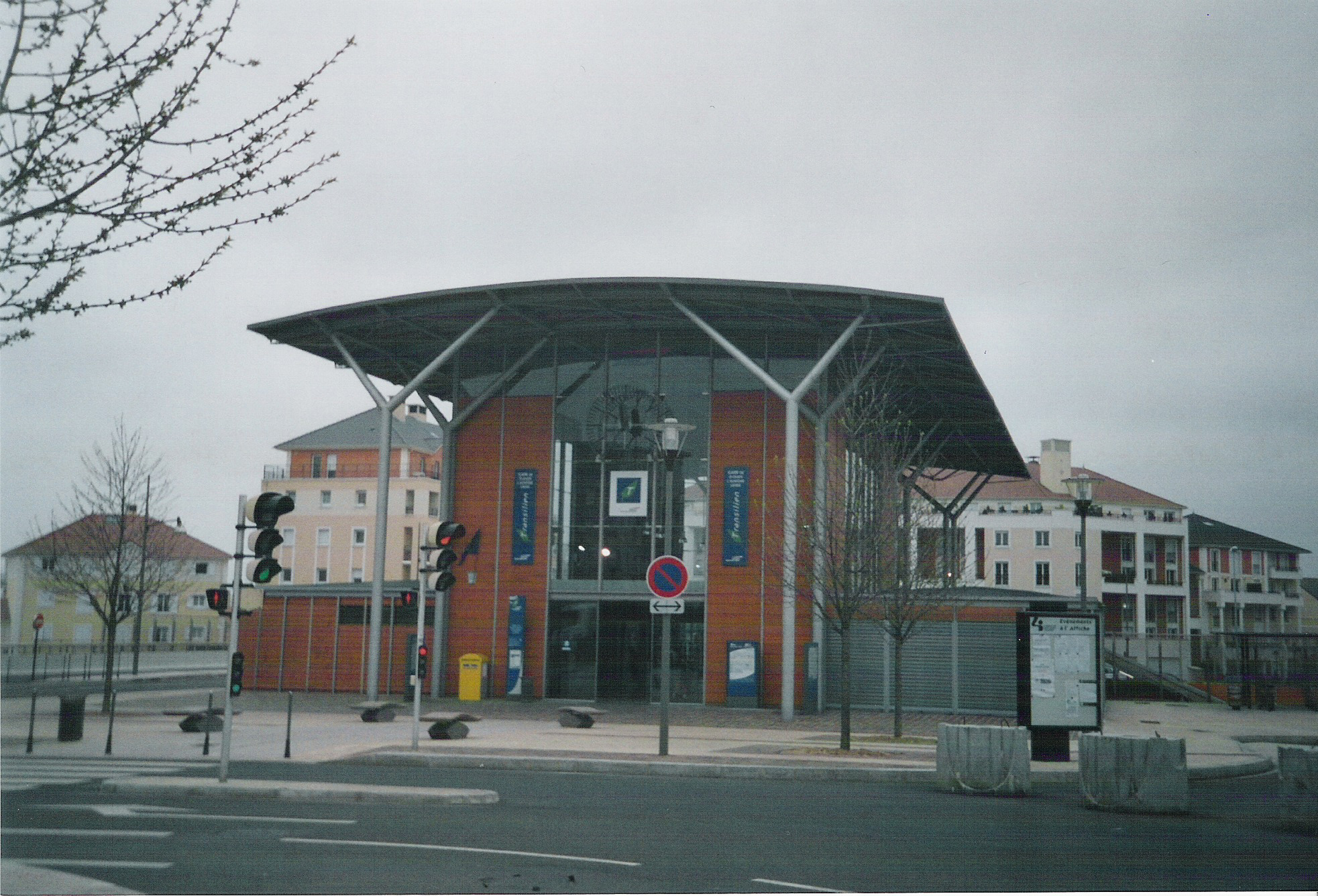
Entrance

Saint-Ouen-l'Aumône-Liesse (French pronunciation: [sɛ̃t‿wɛ̃ lomon ljɛs]) is a railway station in Saint-Ouen-l'Aumône, a northwestern suburb of Paris, France. It is served by Transilien regional trains from Paris to Pontoise, and by RER rapid transit.

== See also ==
- List of stations of the Paris RER

Preceding station	Transilien	Following station
Pierrelaye towards Paris-Nord	Line H	Saint-Ouen-l'Aumône towards Pontoise
Preceding station	RER	Following station
Saint-Ouen-l'Aumône towards Pontoise	RER C	Pierrelaye towards Massy-Palaiseau, Dourdan-la-Forêt or Saint-Martin-d'Étampes
