= Achères–Grand-Cormier station =

Railway station in Saint-Germain-en-Laye, France

Achères Grand Cormier
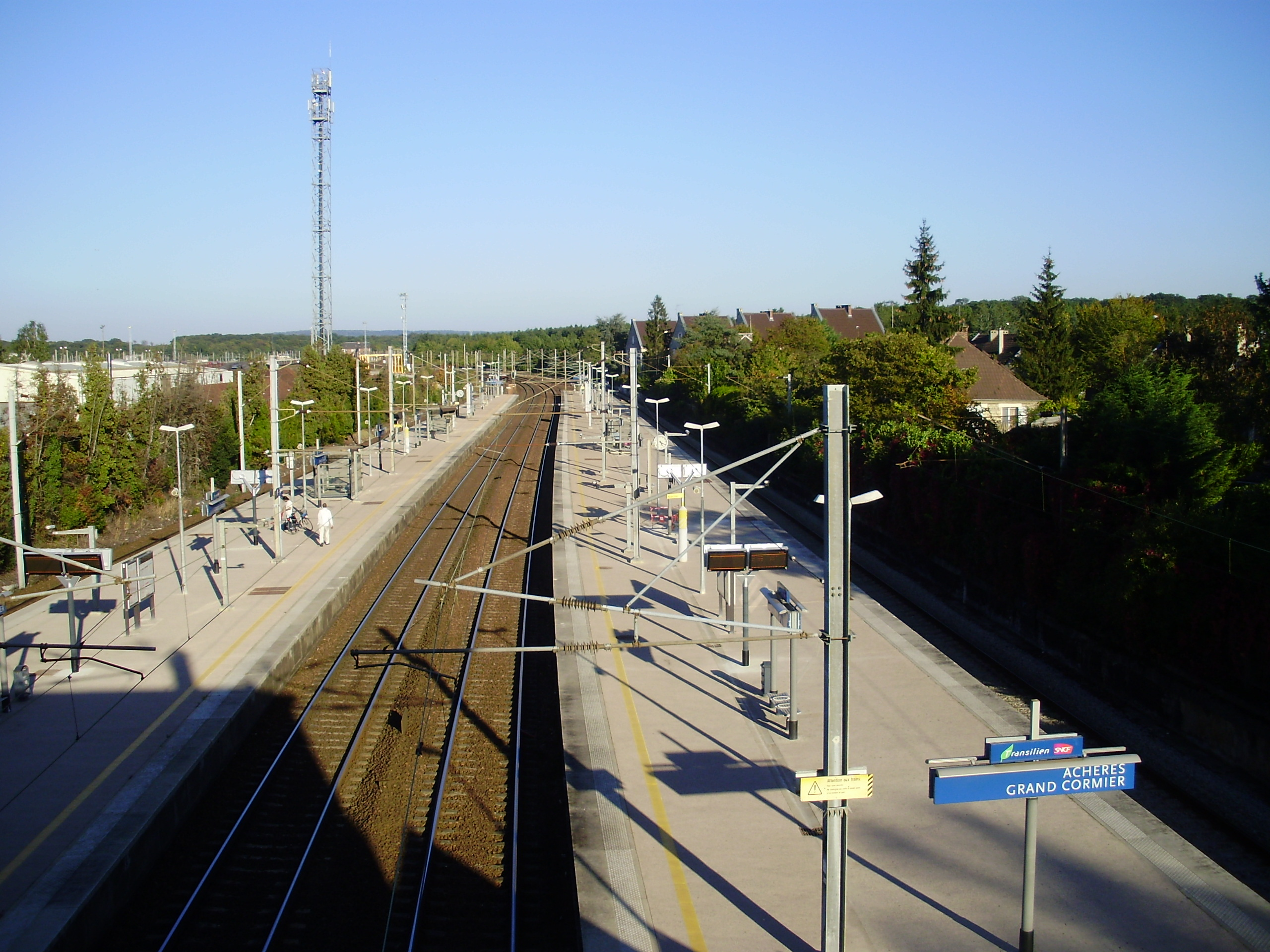
- Upper view of the station

General information
- Location: Achères, Yvelines; France
- Coordinates: 48°57′18″N 2°05′32″E
- Operator: SNCF
- Platforms: 2

Construction
- Accessible: No

Other information
- Station code: 87386052
- Fare zone: 5

History
- Opened: 1989; 37 years ago

Services
Preceding station	RER	Following station
Poissy Terminus	RER A	Maisons-Laffitte towards Marne-la-Vallée–Chessy
Location

Achères–Grand-Cormier station is a French railway station in Achères, Yvelines département, Île-de-France region. It is the only station on the RER A that is not accessible to people with disabilities.

== Location ==
The station is at kilometric point 21.250 of Paris–Le Havre railway. It is inside a rail complex that includes a marshalling yard, a depot, and a maintenance establishment. This complex is the starting point of Achères-Pontoise railway. It is also crossed by Grande Ceinture line. Its altitude is 41 metres (135 ft).

During works on RER line A, Poissy branch is disconnected from the line. Trains serving the station are from Transilien Line L, extended from Maisons-Laffitte to Poissy.

== History ==
The original station was a simple stop put in operation on 9 May 1843 by Compagnie du chemin de fer de Paris à Rouen. Il was a hundred meters northern and was named Étoile de Conflans.

After the classification yard extension and Achères-Pontoise railway was put into service, the station was given the name Achères-Embranchement in 1877. A second building was added next to the first in 1882.

During the 1920s, the name of the station became simply Achères. In 1931, level crossings on RN 184 were removed and a double bridge was built. The former station was neglected, and the current building was put in operation.

It was renamed Achères-Grand-Cormier when the Achères-Ville station was put into operation on Achères-Pontoise railway in 1976. A former stop, named Village d'Achères, used to be on this railway, but was destroyed by bombings during the night from 7 to 8 June 1944. It was not put into service again, but platforms are still visible.

In 2009, 330 people a day entered the station.

== Service ==
=== Facilities ===
The station has two central platforms. Platform A is 226 metres (741 ft) long; platform B is 247 metres (810 ft) long.

=== Train service ===
Achères–Grand-Cormier is served by RER A trains running on A5 branch, ending in Poissy.

=== Access ===
The station is isolated inside the forest of Saint-Germain-en-Laye, on the road from Saint-Germain-en-Laye to Pontoise. Pedestrian access is on national route 184. At night, it is served by Noctilien bus line 152.

== Freight ==
Freight is handled by Achères-Triage station.
