= Saint-Ouen-l'Aumône =

- Commune
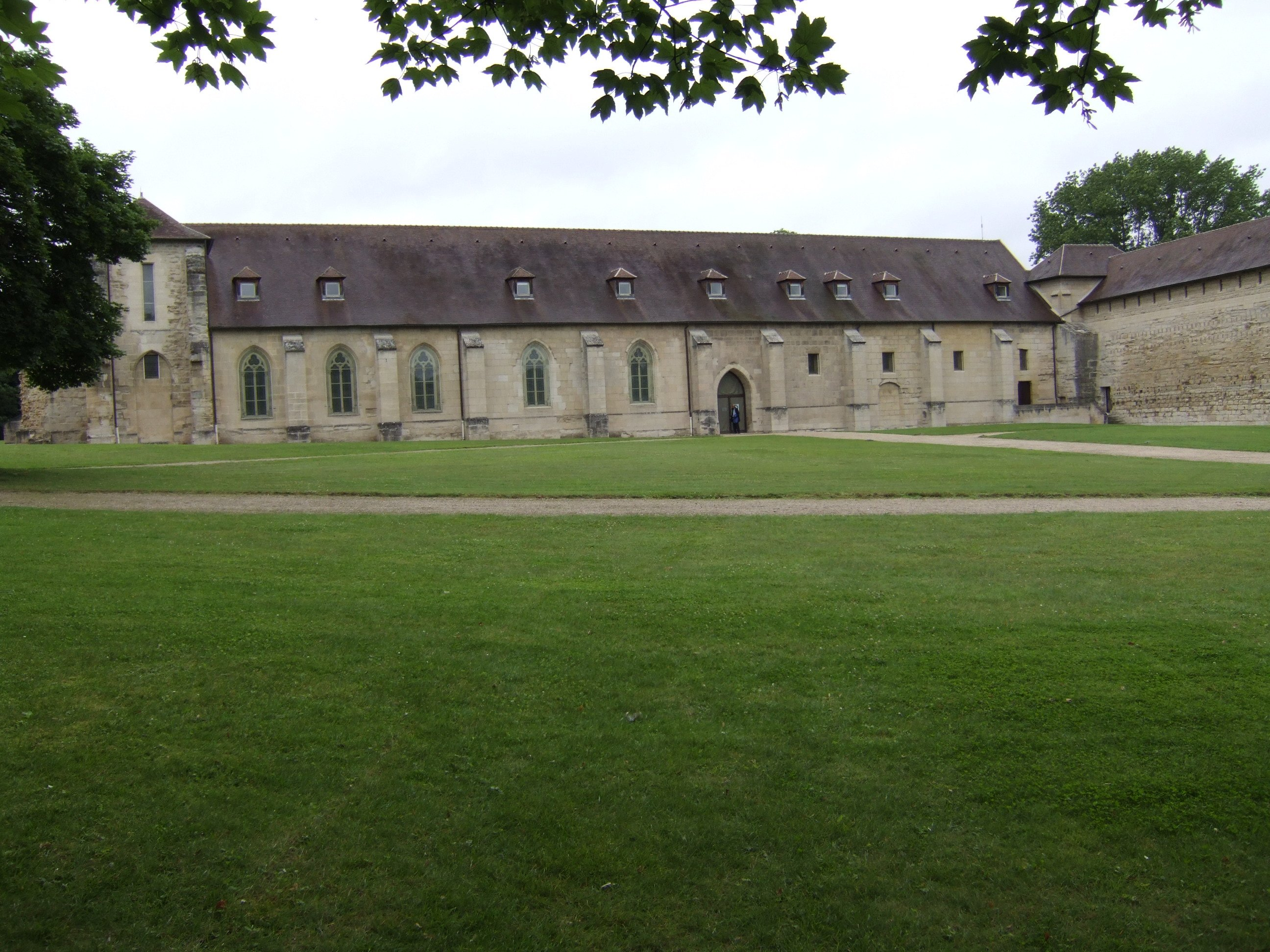
- Maubuisson Abbey

- Coat of arms
- Location of Saint-Ouen-l'Aumône
- Location within France Location within Île-de-France (region)
- Coordinates: 49°02′41″N 2°06′40″E
- Country: France
- Region: Île-de-France
- Department: Val-d'Oise
- Arrondissement: Pontoise
- Canton: Saint-Ouen-l'Aumône
- Intercommunality: Cergy-Pontoise

Government
  - Mayor (2020–2026): Laurent Linquette
- Area^{1}: 12.21 km^{2} (4.71 sq mi)
- Highest elevation: 58 m (190 ft)
- Lowest elevation: 22 m (72 ft)
- Population (2023): 25,578
  - Density: 2,095/km^{2} (5,426/sq mi)
- Time zone: UTC+01:00 (CET)
  - Summer (DST): UTC+02:00 (CEST)
- INSEE/Postal code: 95572 /95310
- ^{1} French Land Register data, which excludes lakes, ponds, glaciers > 1 km^{2} (0.386 sq mi or 247 acres) and river estuaries.

Saint-Ouen-l'Aumône (French pronunciation: [sɛ̃t‿wɛ̃ lomon]) is a commune in the northwestern suburbs of Paris, France. It is located 27.6 km (17.1 mi) from the center of Paris, in the "new town" of Cergy-Pontoise, created in the 1960s.

== History ==
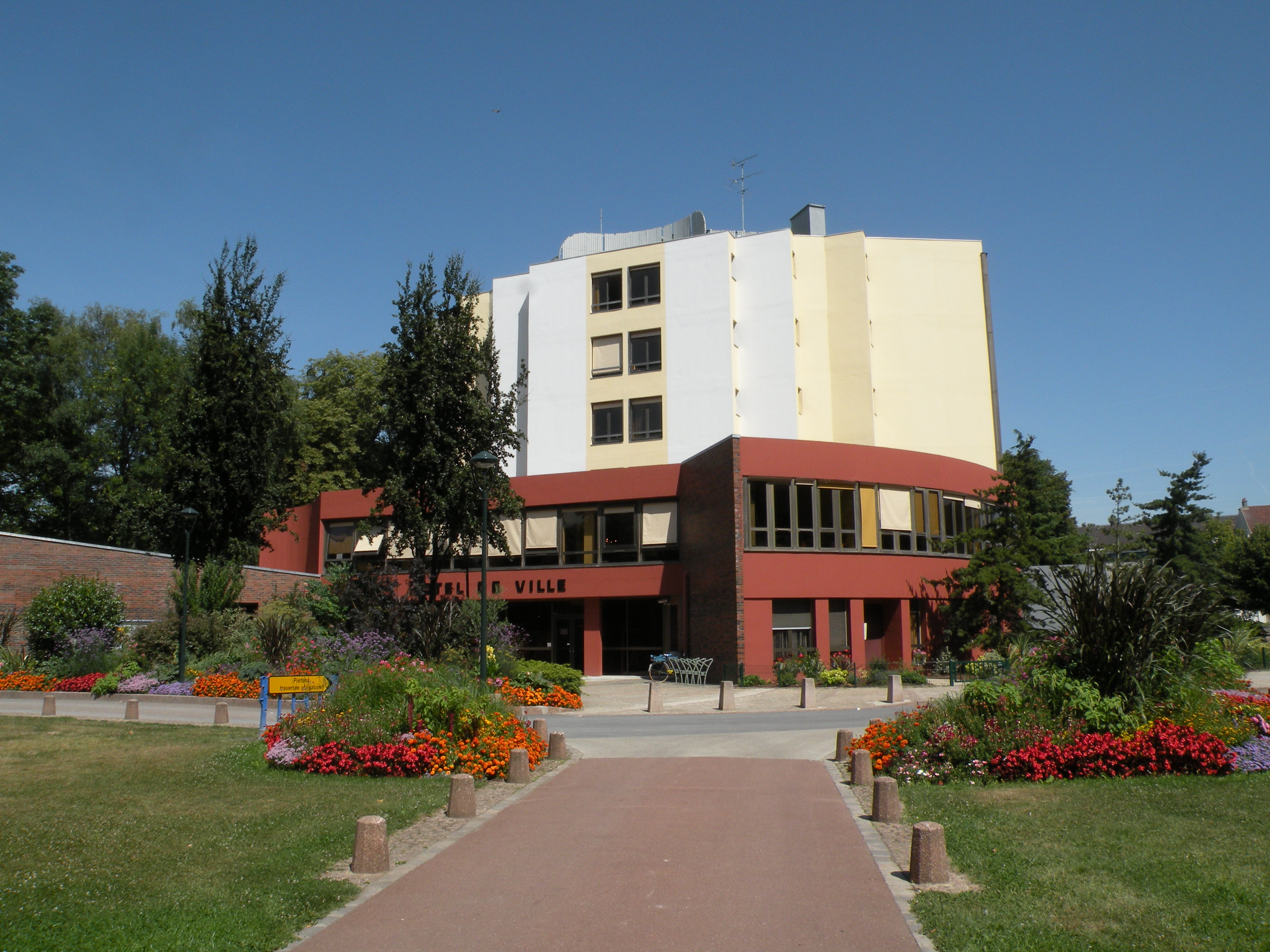
The Hôtel de Ville

The Hôtel de Ville was completed in 1979.

== Population ==
Historical population

| Year | Pop. | ±% p.a. |
|---|---|---|
| 1793 | 1,414 | — |
| 1800 | 1,388 | −0.26% |
| 1806 | 1,404 | +0.19% |
| 1821 | 1,388 | −0.08% |
| 1831 | 1,500 | +0.78% |
| 1836 | 1,585 | +1.11% |
| 1841 | 1,607 | +0.28% |
| 1846 | 1,675 | +0.83% |
| 1851 | 1,777 | +1.19% |
| 1856 | 1,848 | +0.79% |
| 1861 | 2,022 | +1.82% |
| 1866 | 2,057 | +0.34% |
| 1872 | 2,056 | −0.01% |
| 1876 | 2,142 | +1.03% |
| 1881 | 2,139 | −0.03% |
| 1886 | 2,292 | +1.39% |
| 1891 | 2,256 | −0.32% |
| 1896 | 2,535 | +2.36% |
| 1901 | 2,706 | +1.31% |

| Year | Pop. | ±% p.a. |
|---|---|---|
| 1906 | 3,031 | +2.29% |
| 1911 | 3,109 | +0.51% |
| 1921 | 3,268 | +0.50% |
| 1926 | 3,601 | +1.96% |
| 1931 | 4,318 | +3.70% |
| 1936 | 4,610 | +1.32% |
| 1946 | 4,801 | +0.41% |
| 1954 | 5,346 | +1.35% |
| 1962 | 6,985 | +3.40% |
| 1968 | 9,957 | +6.09% |
| 1975 | 15,948 | +6.96% |
| 1982 | 17,098 | +1.00% |
| 1990 | 18,673 | +1.11% |
| 1999 | 19,660 | +0.57% |
| 2007 | 22,876 | +1.91% |
| 2012 | 23,470 | +0.51% |
| 2017 | 23,741 | +0.23% |
| 2023 | 25,578 | +1.25% |

Source: EHESS and INSEE (1968-2023)

== Transport ==
Saint-Ouen-l'Aumône is served by two interchange stations on Paris RER C line and on the Transilien Paris-Nord suburban rail line: Saint-Ouen-l'Aumône-Liesse and Saint-Ouen-l'Aumône.

Saint-Ouen-l'Aumône is also served by two other stations on the Transilien Paris-Nord suburban rail line: Épluches and Pont-Petit.

Finally, Saint-Ouen-l'Aumône is also served by Saint-Ouen-l'Aumône-Quartier de l'Église station on the Transilien Paris-Saint-Lazare suburban rail line.

== Education ==
Schools in the commune include:

- Four sets of preschools (maternelles) and elementary schools: Matisse, Prairie, Jean Effel, Le Nôtre
- One combined preschool and elementary school, Ecole Prévert
- Three primary school groups: De Liesse, Des Borseaux, and Jean-Jacques Rousseau
- Two junior high schools: Collège et SEGPA Marcel Pagnol and Collège Le Parc
- Three senior high schools: Lycée polyvalent Edmond Rostand, Lycée technique Jean Perrin, and Lycée des métiers de l’automobile et du transport du Château d’Épluches

== See also ==
- Communes of the Val-d'Oise department
