= Andrésy =

- Commune
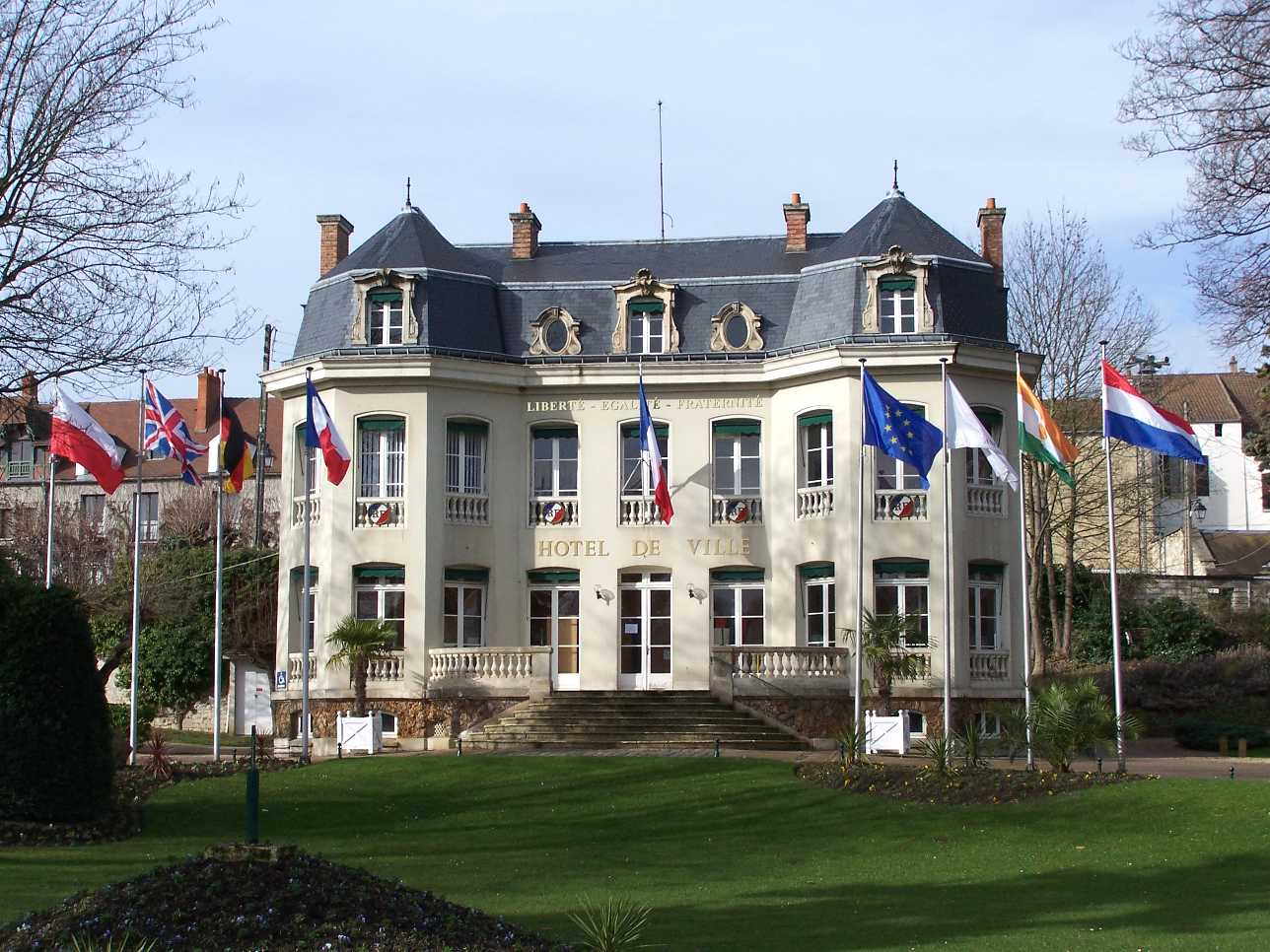
- Town hall

- Coat of arms
- Location of Andrésy
- Location within France Location within Île-de-France (region)
- Coordinates: 48°58′54″N 2°03′33″E
- Country: France
- Region: Île-de-France
- Department: Yvelines
- Arrondissement: Saint-Germain-en-Laye
- Canton: Conflans-Sainte-Honorine
- Intercommunality: Grand Paris Seine et Oise

Government
  - Mayor (2020–2026): Lionel Wastl
- Area^{1}: 6.91 km^{2} (2.67 sq mi)
- Elevation: 30 m (98 ft)
- Highest elevation: 168 m (551 ft)
- Lowest elevation: 17 m (56 ft)
- Population (2023): 13,834
  - Density: 2,000/km^{2} (5,190/sq mi)
- Time zone: UTC+01:00 (CET)
  - Summer (DST): UTC+02:00 (CEST)
- INSEE/Postal code: 78015 /78570
- ^{1} French Land Register data, which excludes lakes, ponds, glaciers > 1 km^{2} (0.386 sq mi or 247 acres) and river estuaries.

Andrésy (French pronunciation: [ɑ̃dʁezi]) is a commune in the Yvelines department in north-central France.

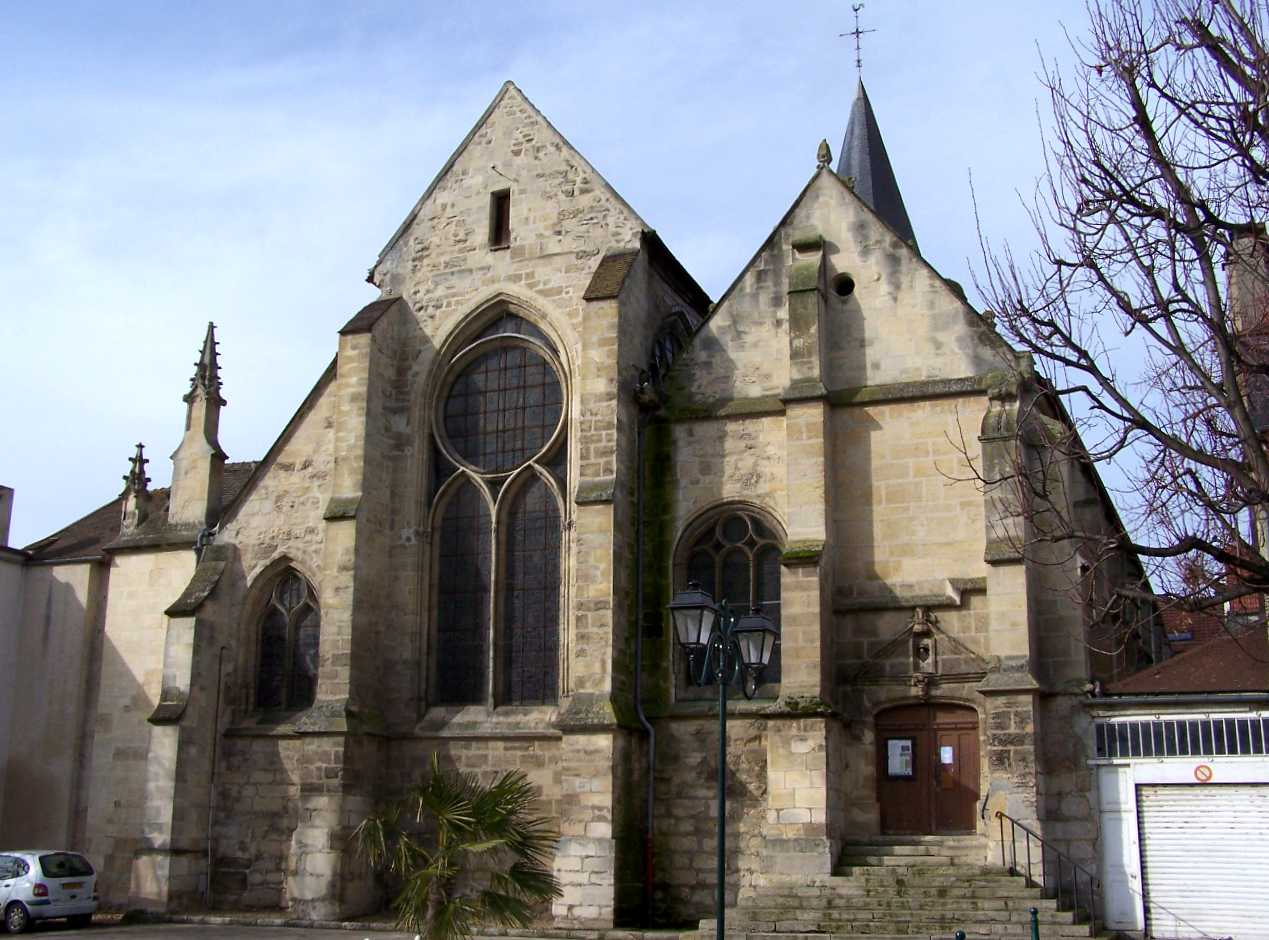
Saint-Germain church

== Population ==
Historical population

Year	Pop.	±% p.a.
1793	1,079	—
1800	1,017	−0.84%
1806	938	−1.34%
1821	895	−0.31%
1831	919	+0.26%
1836	942	+0.50%
1841	862	−1.76%
1846	945	+1.86%
1851	937	−0.17%
1856	907	−0.65%
1861	952	+0.97%
1866	939	−0.27%
1872	942	+0.05%
1876	970	+0.73%
1881	962	−0.17%
1886	1,117	+3.03%
1891	1,256	+2.37%
1896	1,265	+0.14%
1901	1,323	+0.90%

Year	Pop.	±% p.a.
1906	1,310	−0.20%
1911	1,469	+2.32%
1921	1,759	+1.82%
1926	1,977	+2.36%
1931	2,234	+2.47%
1936	2,456	+1.91%
1946	2,968	+1.91%
1954	3,279	+1.25%
1962	4,189	+3.11%
1968	4,876	+2.56%
1975	8,927	+9.02%
1982	11,185	+3.27%
1990	12,548	+1.45%
1999	12,485	−0.06%
2007	12,501	+0.02%
2012	11,991	−0.83%
2017	13,324	+2.13%
2023	13,834	+0.63%

Source: EHESS and INSEE (1968-2023)

== Twin towns – sister cities ==
Andrésy is twinned with:

- Haren, Germany
- Międzyrzecz, Poland
- Oundle, England, United Kingdom
- Westerwolde, Netherlands

== See also ==
- Communes of the Yvelines department
