= Cergy-Saint-Christophe station =

Railway station in Cergy, France

Cergy-Saint-Christophe
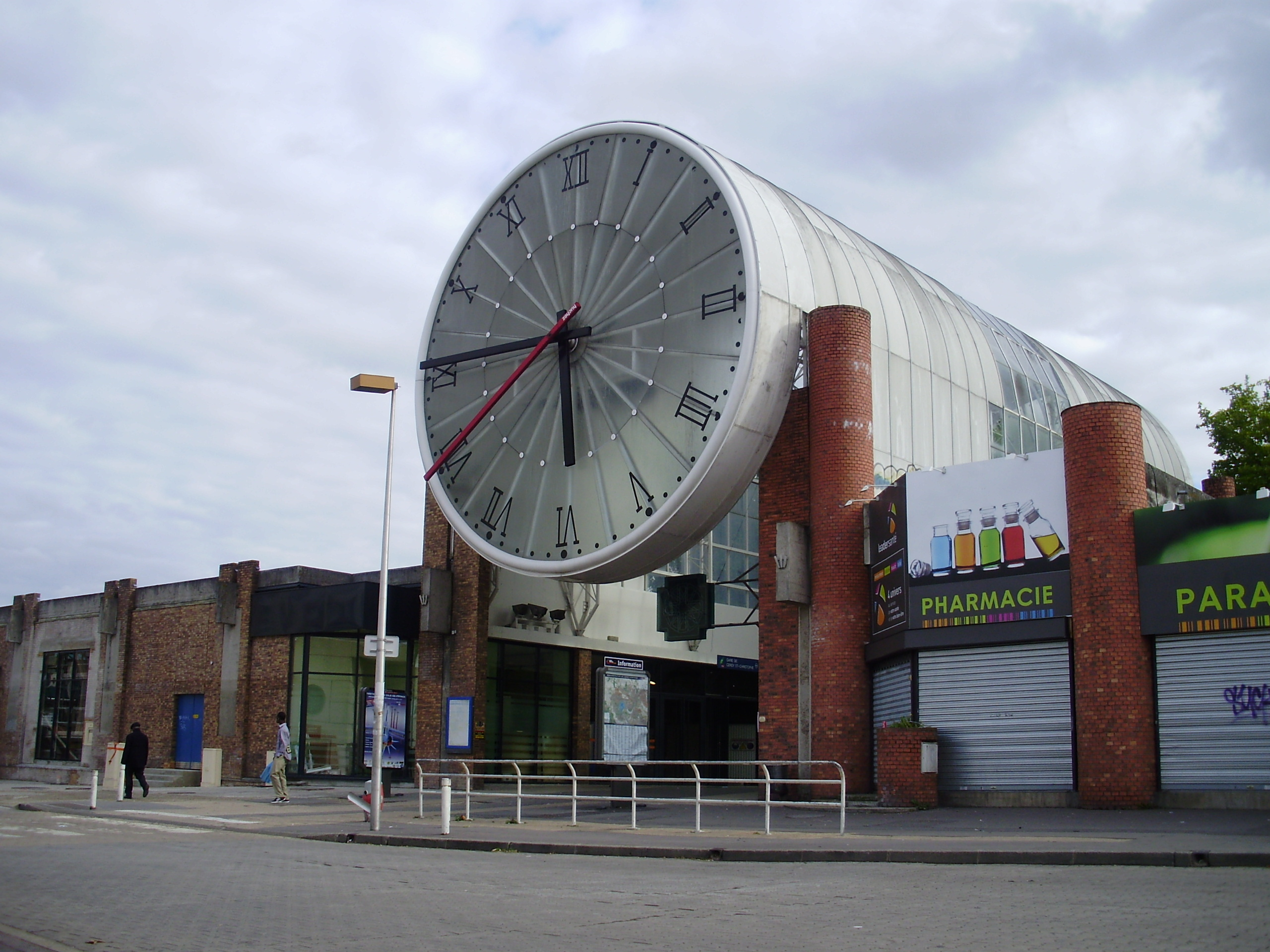
- Clock passage, viewed from the north, within which the entrance to the station is located.

General information
- Location: Rue de l'Abondance; 95800 Cergy; France
- Coordinates: 49°02′59″N 2°02′04″E
- Operator: SNCF
- Platforms: 2 side platforms
- Tracks: 2

Construction
- Structure type: Below-grade
- Parking: 612 spaces
- Accessible: Yes, by prior reservation

Other information
- Station code: 87382499
- Fare zone: 5

History
- Opened: 29 September 1985

Passengers
- 2024: 7,820,531

Services
Preceding station	RER	Following station
Cergy-le-Haut Terminus	RER A	Cergy-Préfecture towards Marne-la-Vallée–Chessy
Preceding station	Transilien	Following station
Cergy-le-Haut Terminus	Line L	Cergy-Préfecture towards Paris–Saint Lazare
Location

Cergy-Saint-Christophe (French: Gare de Cergy-Saint-Christophe) is a French railway station in the city of Cergy, France. The station opened on 29 September 1985 along with Cergy-Préfecture station. It was, until 1994, the terminus for RER's line A3 but is now the penultimate stop.

The station building is a large glass structure placed above the line at street level and comprises a metal and glass cylinder and Europe's largest clock. The architects were Martine and Philippe Deslandes, and the twin clock mechanisms were provided by Huchez.

Buildings have soon followed the station and the area is now Cergy's second shopping centre. From the station forecourt a pedestrian street leads to the plaza of the Axe Majeur from which is a view of the Vallée de l'Oise and of Paris. The axe is aligned with Paris' Champ de Mars.

== Location ==
The station is established at an altitude of 97 meters, at located at kilometric point (PK) 36.665 of the Neuville–Cergy-Préfecture line, between the stations Cergy-le-Haut and Cergy-Préfecture.

== Attendance ==
From 2015 to 2024, according to SNCF estimates, the annual passenger traffic at the station amounted to the figures indicated in the table below:

Year	2015	2016	2017	2018	2019	2020	2021	2022	2023	2024
Passengers	6,453,027	6,806,293	7,125,540	7,369,355	7,960,627	5,544,432	7,818,214	6,961,854	7,092,079	7,820,531

== Connections ==
=== Train service ===
The station is served by trains of RER A towards Cergy-le-Haut and Boissy-Saint-Léger or Marne-la-Vallée – Chessy, and trains of Transilien Line L towards Cergy-le-Haut and Paris-Saint-Lazare.

=== Bus connections ===
==== Île-de-France ====
The station is connected by many lines from different networks organized by Île-de-France Mobilités:

- Vexin: 1117, 1143, 9504
- Cergy-Pontoise Confluence: 1201 1206 1224 1235 1239 1240
- Lignes Île-de-France Ouest: 7808
- Mantois: 5409
- Poissy - Les Mureaux: 6559 6591
- Noctilien: N150 N152

==== Hauts-de-France ====
The station is also served by many bus lines from Réseau interurbain de l'Oise, a bus network operated by Hauts-de-France Mobilités:

- Réseau interurbain de l'Oise: 604, 609

== Gallery ==
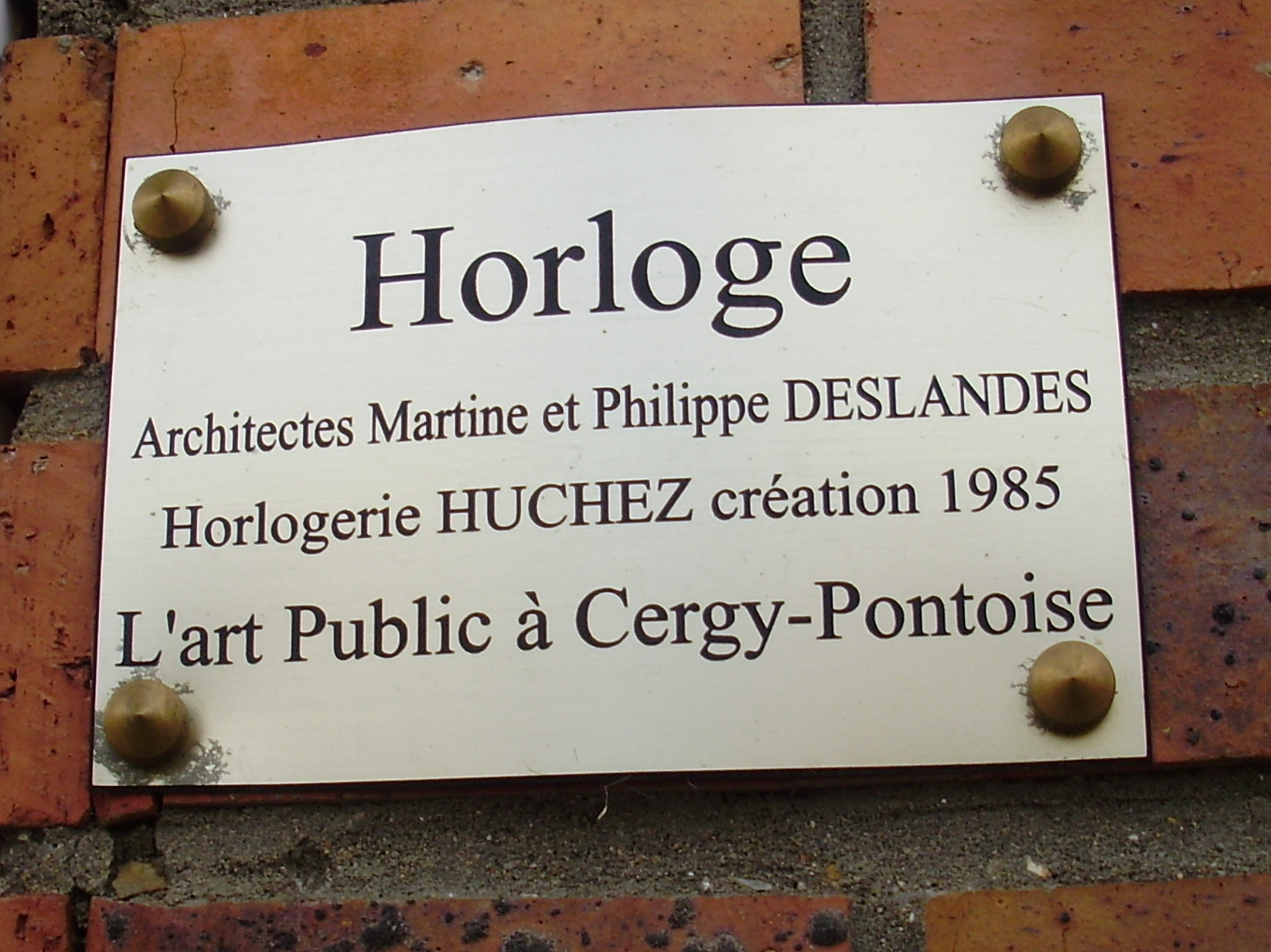
Wall plaque in the station identifying the architects and providers of the clock mechanisms
