= Cergy-le-Haut station =

Railway station in Cergy, France

Cergy le Haut
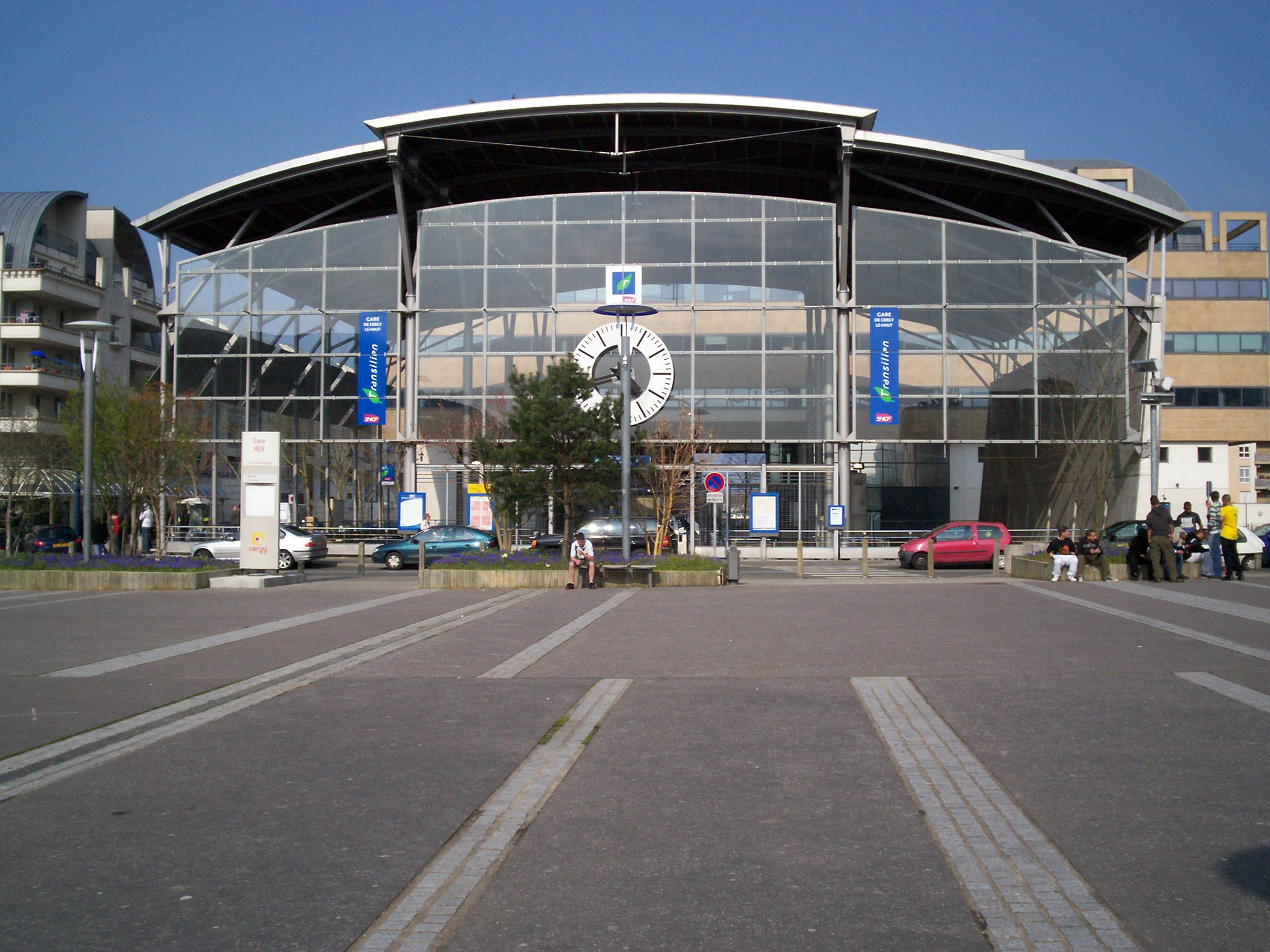
- Cergy-le-Haut station entrance

General information
- Location: 2, rue du Lendemain; 95800 Cergy; France
- Coordinates: 49°02′53″N 2°00′43″E
- Operator: SNCF
- Platforms: 2 island platforms
- Tracks: 4

Construction
- Structure type: At-grade
- Parking: 1,134 spaces
- Accessible: Yes, by request to staff

Other information
- Station code: 87382655
- Fare zone: 5

History
- Opened: 29 August 1994

Passengers
- 2024: 7,882,317

Services
Preceding station	RER	Following station
Terminus	RER A	Cergy-Saint-Christophe towards Boissy-Saint-Léger or Marne-la-Vallée–Chessy
Preceding station	Transilien	Following station
Terminus	Line L	Cergy-Saint-Christophe towards Paris–Saint Lazare
Location

Cergy-le-Haut (French pronunciation: [sɛʁʒi lə o]) is a railway station in Cergy, a western Paris suburb, that serves trains on the RER A line of the Réseau Express Régional network and Line L line of the Transilien network.

== Location ==
The station is established at an altitude of 102 meters, and located at kilometric point (PK) 38.434 of the Neuville–Cergy-Préfecture line.

== History ==
The station was built in 1994 and is located underground in a shallow cut and cover tunnel. When first built, the station was located in an area of open fields, now built upon and is part of the network of stations serving the ville nouvelle of Cergy-Pontoise. It was part of a large project to develop the area and smart Parisian style buildings have been built next to the station around a plaza situated above the tracks. Cergy-le-Haut is not yet fully developed so fields are next to the station and next to seven-storey high apartment buildings.

== Attendance ==
From 2015 to 2024, according to SNCF estimates, the annual passenger traffic at the station amounted to the figures indicated in the table below:

Year	2015	2016	2017	2018	2019	2020	2021	2022	2023	2024
Passengers	6,647,546	6,743,592	6,809,697	6,755,489	6,739,264	3,298,015	4,792,833	7,096,311	7,148,098	7,882,317

== Service ==
=== Train service ===
The station is served by trains of RER A towards Boissy-Saint-Léger or Marne-la-Vallée – Chessy, and trains of Transilien Line L towards Paris-Saint-Lazare.

During rush hours, it is served by trains of RER A every ten minutes, as well for the Transilien Line L.

=== Bus connections ===
The station is connected by these bus lines:

- Vexin: 1114, 1115, 1116, 1117, 1143
- Cergy-Pontoise Confluence: 1201 1203 1206 1236 1239 1240
- Poissy - Les Mureaux: 6521 6559 6591
- Noctilien: N150 N152

== See also ==
- List of stations of the Paris RER
