= Pontoise station =

Railway station in Pontoise, France

Pontoise
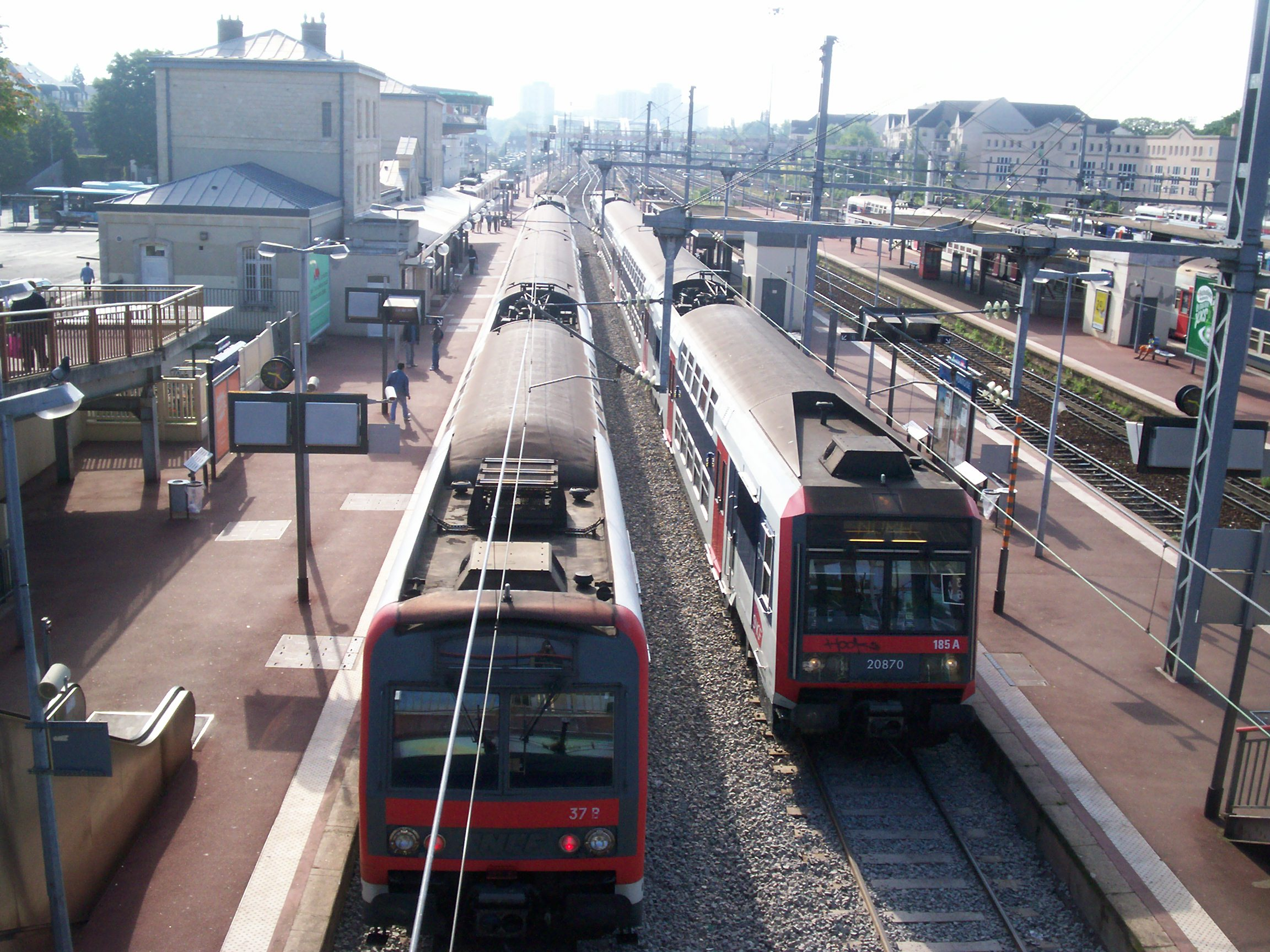
- Pontoise station platforms

General information
- Location: Place du General-de-Gaulle; Pontoise; France
- Coordinates: 49°02′46″N 2°05′42″E
- Elevation: 28 m (92 ft)
- Operator: SNCF
- Platforms: 5 island platforms
- Tracks: 11

Construction
- Parking: 503 spaces
- Accessible: Yes, by prior reservation
- Architect: Jules-Léon Lejeune

Other information
- Station code: 87276139
- Fare zone: 5

History
- Opened: 1863

Passengers
- 2024: 8,480,463

Services
Preceding station	RER	Following station
Terminus	RER C	Saint-Ouen-l'Aumône towards Massy-Palaiseau, Dourdan-la-Forêt or Saint-Martin-d'Étampes
Preceding station	Transilien	Following station
Terminus	Line H	Saint-Ouen-l'Aumône towards Paris-Nord
Terminus	Line H	Saint-Ouen-l'Aumône towards Creil
Osny towards Gisors	Line J	Saint-Ouen-l'Aumône-Quartier de l'Église towards Paris-Saint-Lazare
Location

Pontoise station (French pronunciation: [pɔ̃twaz]) is the train station serving the city of Pontoise and the surrounding suburbs. The station is a large building situated on Place Charles de Gaulle itself at the bottom end of Rue Thiers. Rue Thiers was built for the station and links Pontoise's Medieval centre to the railway.

The station was opened to link Paris to Dieppe, it is parallel to the line with a long footbridge stretching over the lines to the Canrobert bus station. Trains no longer serve Dieppe (now rerouted via Rouen) but is well served by regional trains (Transilien) to Paris St-Lazare and Paris Nord. Pontoise Station is also served by RER C which uses a new bridge built of the River Oise to increase capacity.

== See also ==
- List of stations of the Paris RER
