= Créteil Pompadour station =

Railway station in France

Créteil Pompadour
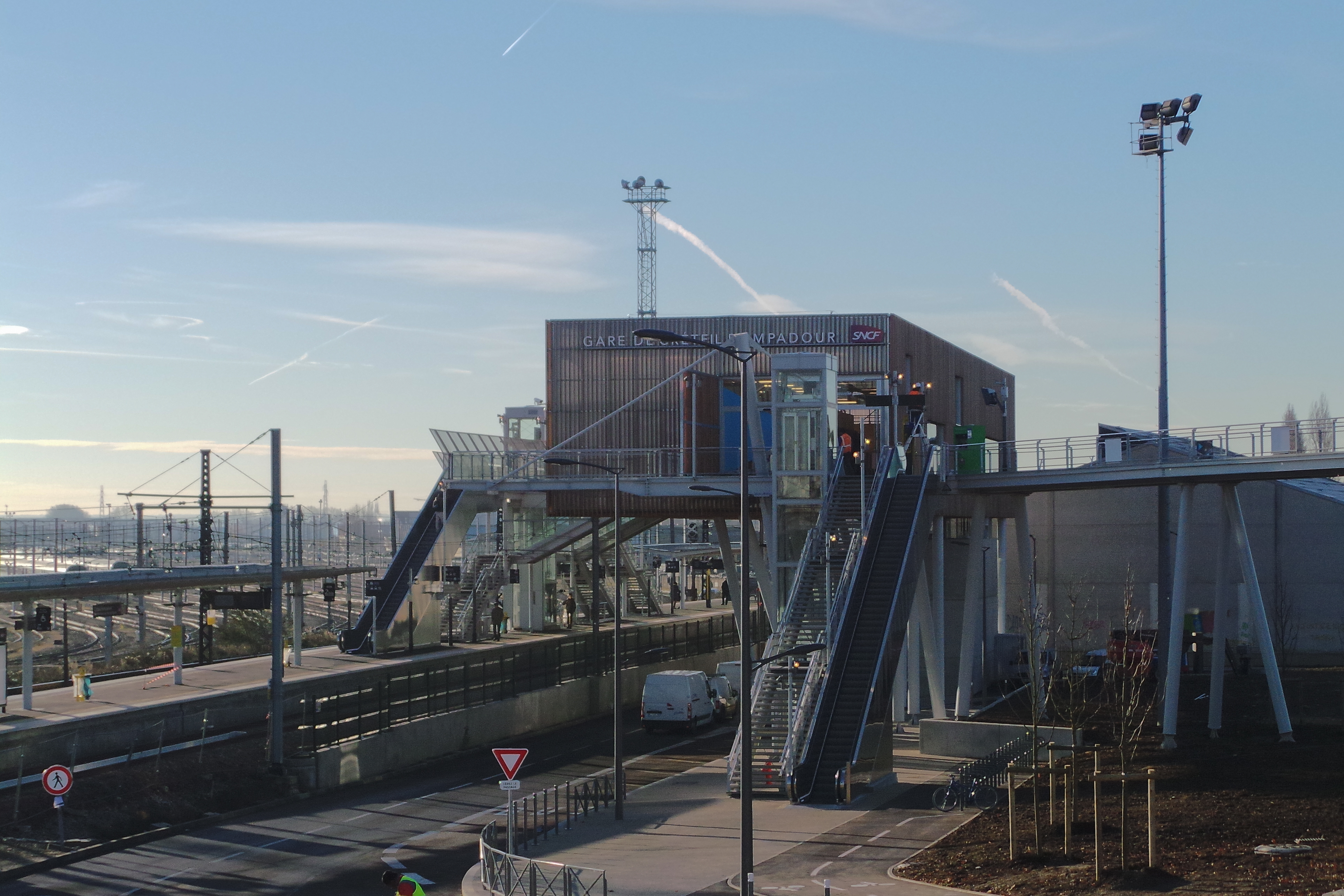
- Créteil-Pompadour station platforms

General information
- Location: Créteil; France
- Coordinates: 48°46′18″N 2°26′07″E
- Operator: SNCF
- Line: Paris–Marseille railway
- Platforms: 1 island platforms
- Tracks: 3
- Connections: RATP Bus: Tvm 393; Marne et Seine: O1, O2; Noctilien: N71

Construction
- Structure type: At-grade
- Accessible: Yes, by prior reservation

Other information
- Station code: 87608802
- Fare zone: 3

History
- Opened: 15 December 2013

Passengers
- 2024: 8,339,243

Services
Preceding station	RER	Following station
Maisons-Alfort–Alfortville towards Goussainville	RER D	Villeneuve-Saint-Georges towards Melun
Le Vert de Maisons towards Orry-la-Ville–Coye	RER D	Villeneuve-Triage towards Corbeil-Essonnes
Le Vert de Maisons towards Creil	RER D	Villeneuve-Triage towards Corbeil-Essonnes
Location

Créteil Pompadour station is a railway station located in Créteil, a suburb south of Paris, France. The station was opened on 15 December 2013 and is located on the Paris–Marseille railway. The station is served by Paris' express suburban rail system, the RER. The train services are operated by SNCF.

The station replaced Villeneuve–Prairie station and serves the nearby Parc Interdépartemental des Sports (Interdepartmental Sports Park).

== Train services ==
The station is served by the following services:

- Local services (RER D) Goussainville – St Denis – Paris – Villeneuve St Georges – Combs la Ville – Melun
- Local services (RER D) Paris – Villeneuve St Georges – Juvisy – Évry Centre – Corbeil Essonnes
- Local services (RER D) Creil – Orry la Ville – Gouissainville – St Denis – Paris – Villeneuve St Georges – Juvisy – Évry – Corbeil Essonnes

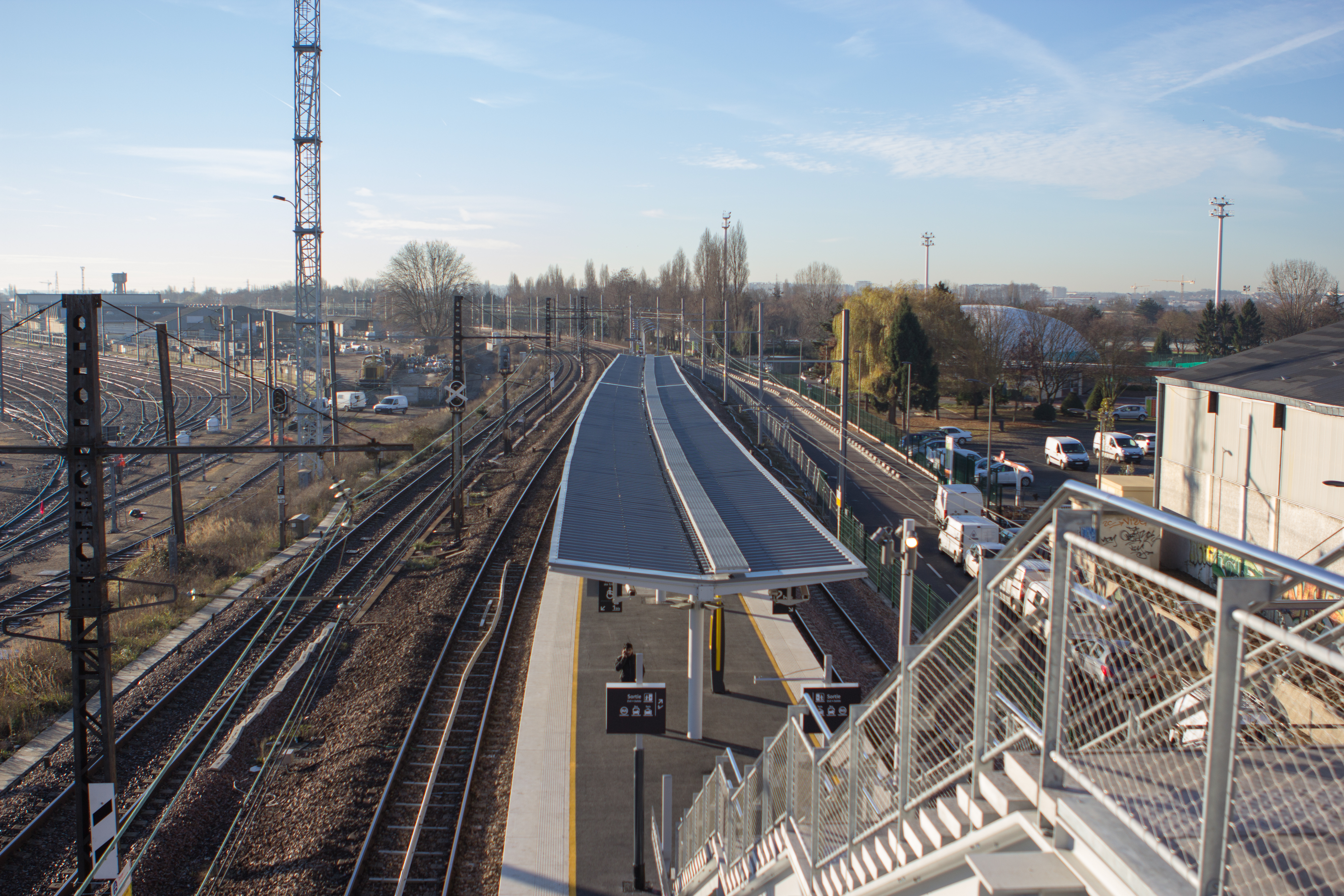
View over the platforms

== See also ==
- List of Réseau Express Régional stations
