= Maisons-Alfort–Alfortville station =

Railway station in France

Maisons-Alfort–Alfortville
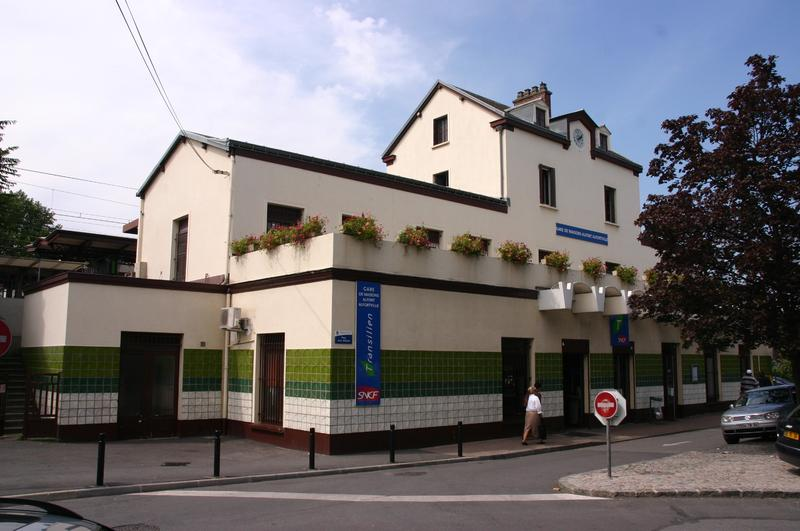
- Maisons-Alfort–Alfortville station

General information
- Location: Alfortville and Maisons-Alfort, Val-de-Marne, Île-de-France, France
- Coordinates: 48°48′07″N 2°25′36″E
- Line: Paris–Marseille railway
- Platforms: 5
- Tracks: 6

Construction
- Accessible: Yes, by prior reservation

Other information
- Station code: 87681155
- Fare zone: 3

History
- Opened: 12 August 1849

Passengers
- 2024: 14,504,292

Services
Preceding station	RER	Following station
Gare de Lyon towards Goussainville	RER D	Créteil-Pompadour towards Melun
Gare de Lyon towards Orry-la-Ville–Coye	RER D	Le Vert de Maisons towards Corbeil-Essonnes
Gare de Lyon towards Creil	RER D	Le Vert de Maisons towards Corbeil-Essonnes
Gare de Lyon towards Villiers-le-Bel–Gonesse–Arnouville	RER D	Villeneuve-Saint-Georges towards Corbeil-Essonnes
Location

Maisons-Alfort–Alfortville is a railway station in Maisons-Alfort and Alfortville, Val-de-Marne, Paris, France. The station was opened on 12 August 1849 and is on the Paris–Marseille railway. The station is served by the Paris express suburban rail system, the RER. The train services are operated by SNCF. –

== Train services ==
The station is served on the following routes:

- Local services (RER D) Goussainville–St Denis–Paris–Villeneuve St Georges–Combs la Ville–Melun
- Local services (RER D) Paris–Villeneuve St Georges–Juvisy–Évry Centre–Corbeil Essonnes
- Local services (RER D) Creil–Orry la Ville–Gouissainville–St Denis–Paris–Villeneuve St Georges–Juvisy–Évry–Corbeil Essonnes
- Local services (RER D) Villiers-le-Bel–St Denis–Paris–Villeneuve St Georges–Juvisy–Évry Centre–Malesherbes

== See also ==
- List of stations of the Paris RER
