= List of Réseau Express Régional stations =

This is a list of Réseau Express Régional (RER) stations for the regional rapid transit system of Île-de-France, France.

== Key to symbols ==
- TGV inOui (high-speed long-distance trains)
- Ouigo (high-speed long-distance trains)
- Eurostar (high-speed long-distance trains)
- Transport express régional (regional trains from neighbouring regions)
- Transilien (regional trains other than RER)
  - Transilien Paris-Nord
  - Transilien Paris-Saint-Lazare
  - Transilien Line N
  - Transilien Line P
  - Transilien Line R
  - Transilien Line U
  - Transilien Line V
- RER
  - RER A
  - RER B
  - RER C
  - RER D
  - RER E
- Paris Métro
- Tramways in Île-de-France
- Bus (RATP)
- Noctilien
- Bus (other than RATP)
- Orlyval

== Stations ==
Station	Branch	Zone	Served municipalities	Connections
Ablon	C4 C6	4		AthisCar 3/8; N131
Achères–Grand-Cormier	A5	5	Saint-Germain-en-Laye	
Achères-Ville	A3	5	Achères	Connex 5
Aéroport Charles de Gaulle 1	B3	5	Tremblay-en-France	ADP Beu, RATP 349/350/351, CIF 9/9A/20/32/36/39/43/93/701/702/706/709, Alobus Rouge, Alobus Jaune, Alobus Bleu, «Picardie Roissy"; TVS, TRA, TransVO 22, Bus95 95.01/95.02 and Jaune; N120/N121/N140
Aéroport Charles de Gaulle 2 TGV	B3	5	Tremblay-en-France	; ADP Rouge, Bleu, Vert & cars Air France 2/3/4; N120/N121/N140
Antony	B4	4	Antony	196/286/297/395/396; N21
Arcueil–Cachan	B	3	Arcueil, Cachan	162/187; N14
Arpajon	C4	5		SAVAC 39.18; TransEssonne 91-04. N131
Athis-Mons	C4 C6	4		
Auber	A	1	Paris	Saint-Lazare; 20/22/27/29/53/66/81/95, RoisyBus; Opentour
Aulnay-sous-Bois	B	4	Aulnay-sous-Bois	251, TRA 605/607a/613/614/615/616ab/617/618/627/637/680/702; and CIF 15; N140
Avenue du Président Kennedy	C1	1	Paris	70/72
Avenue Henri Martin	C1	1	Paris	63
Bagneux	B	3	Bagneux, Cachan	197/297; N21
Ballancourt	D4	6		
Bibliothèque François Mitterrand	C	1	Paris	62/89/132/323; N131
Boigneville	D4	5		
Boissy-Saint-Léger	A2	4	Boissy-Saint-Léger	SETRA 6/11/12/21/22/23/101; SITUS 5/6; STRAV J1, J2
Bondy	E2	3	Bondy	TRA;
Boulainvilliers	C1	1	Paris	22/32/52
Bouray	C6	6	Lardy	N131
Bourg-la-Reine	B	3	Bourg-la-Reine	172/192/197/297/388/390/391/394; N14/N21
Boussy-Saint-Antoine	D2	5	Boussy St Antoine Quincy ss Sénart	SETRA 6; STRAV C1, C2
Boutigny	D4	6	Boutigny-sur-Essonne	
Brétigny	C4 C6	5	Brétigny-sur-Orge	Daniel Mayer 13/16/19; TransEssonne 91-04; Orgebus 1/2a/2b/3/6 N131
Breuillet-Bruyères-le-Châtel	C4	6		N131
Breuillet-Village	C4	6		N131
Brunoy	D2	5	Brunoy, Épinay sous Sénart, Mandres Les Roses	STRAV C1, C2, D, M, Q; TransEssonne 91-01
Bry-sur-Marne	A4	4	Bry-sur-Marne, Noisy-le-Grand	120/210/220/520
Buno-Gironville	D4	7		
Bures-sur-Yvette	B4	5	Bures-sur-Yvette	Mobicaps 4/20
Bussy-Saint-Georges	A4	5	Bussy-Saint-Georges	AMV 22 and 26; cars Biziers 03.109
Cergy-Préfecture	A3	5	Cergy	STIVO 38/42/42O/44/45/48abc/49abc/56/57/58; 95/95.03ab/95.04/95.06/95.06/95.07/95.15/95.16/95.18/95.19ab/92.20/95.41; Vexibus 27.01; Connex 80; ComBus Y; «Ville en Ville» 16/27; CSO 16 and CAB-ARO 37E
Cergy-Saint-Christophe	A3	5	Cergy	STIVO 34N/39/40/44/45; 95/95.04/95.06/95.41; Connex 80; CSO 14 and ComBus Y
Cergy-le-Haut	A3	5	Cergy-le-Haut	STIVO 34N/34S/36/39; 95/95.04/95.06 and Connex 2
Cernay	C1	4	Ermont	Lacroix 30.11/30.22
Cesson	D2	5	Cesson, Vert S Denis, Seine-Port, Savigny Le Temple	SénartBus 30/36/40/41/42/43/44/60A/60C; TRAM O
Chamarande	C6	5	Chamarande	N131
Champ de Mars–Tour Eiffel	C	1	Paris	Bus
Champigny	A2	4	Saint-Maur-des-Fossés	111/116/117/208abs and CEAT 10.03
Chantilly-Gouvieux	D1	*		
Charles de Gaulle–Étoile	A	1	Paris	22/30/31/52/73/92, cars Air France 2
Châtelet–Les Halles	A B D	1	Paris	21/38/67/72/74/75/76/58/81/85/96
Chatou–Croissy	A1	4	Chatou-sur-Seine; Croissy-sur-Seine	Connex 7 and «Bus en Seine» 2A/2C/3B/3D/4A/4B/4C/20
Chaville–Vélizy	C5 C7	3	Chaville Viroflay Vélizy	Phebus CVJ; Louis Gaubert
Chelles–Gournay	E2	4	Chelles	113/213/313; TRA 613/642c scolaire; TVS 54.10; 13/19; APOLO A, B, C, E
Chemin d'Antony	C2	4	Antony	297
Choisy-le-Roi	C	3		103/182/393/396; choisybus; TVM; AthisCar 3/9; N131
Cité Universitaire	B2	1	Paris	Tramways in Île-de-France Île-de-France tramway Line 3a
Combs-la-Ville–Quincy	D2	5	Combs la Ville, Brie Comte Robert	SénartBus 10/11/12/13/14/15/20; SETRA 7/20; STRAV M
Conflans-Fin-d'Oise	A3	5		Connex 5/11/14; CSO and de nuit
Corbeil-Essonnes	D4	5		Tice 401/405; ?? 3A/3B
Courcelle-sur-Yvette	B4	5	Gif-sur-Yvette	Mobicaps 12/13
Creil	D1	*	Creil	Transilien Transilien Line H (Paris-Nord) TER
Denfert-Rochereau	B	1	Paris	38/68/88 and CEAT
Dourdan	C4	6		N131
Dourdan-la-Forêt	C4	6		
Drancy	B	3	Drancy	148/346/348, N42; TRA703
Égly	C4	5		Daniel Mayer 20; N131
Émerainville–Pontault-Combault	E4	4	Émerainville	
Épinay-sur-Orge	C4 C6	4	Épinay-sur-Orge	Tice 402; N131
Épinay-sur-Seine	C1	3	Épinay-sur-Seine	138/154/238/254/361; Valmy 11; N150
Ermont–Eaubonne	C1	4	Ermont; Eaubonne	138, Cars Roses 38.01/38.04; Valmy 10/14; Valoise 95.19b; Lacroix 30.11
Étampes	C6	6		N131
Étréchy	C6	6	Etrechy	N131
Évry-Courcouronnes	D4 via Grigny	5	Évry, Courcouronnes	Tice 401/402/403/404/405/407/408/414/453; SénartExpress 50
Évry-Val-de-Seine	D4 via Ris	5	Évry, Soisy sur Seine	Tice 403/408/453
Fontaine-Michalon	B4	4	Antony	21
Fontenay-aux-Roses	B2	3	Fontenay-aux-Roses	128/394
Fontenay-sous-Bois	A2	3	Fontenay sous Bois	124
Franconville – Le Plessis-Bouchard	C1	4	Franconville; Le Plessis-Bouchard	Lacroix 30.03abcdefg/30.14; N150
Gagny	E2	4	Gagny	
Garges–Sarcelles	D1	4	Garges-lès-Gonesse Sarcelles	133/252/269/270/333/368; Bus95 95.02; CIF 31; Filéo
Gennevilliers	C1	3	Gennevilliers	166/178/240/378/538; N51
Gentilly	B	2	Gentilly	125;
Gif-sur-Yvette	B4	5	Gif-sur-Yvette	Mobicaps 10/11; SAVAC 39.02
Goussainville	D1	5		12/12Zi/30abd/32/46; GBus; Bus95 95.10
Gretz-Armainvilliers	E4	5	Gretz-Armainvilliers	Darche-Gros 30
Grigny-Centre	D4 via Grigny	5		Tice 402/510
Haussmann–Saint-Lazare	E	1	Paris	Auber; ; 20/21/22/24/26/27/28/29/43/53/66/80/81/94/95
Houilles–Carrières-sur-Seine	A3 A5	4	Houilles–Carrières-sur-Seine	363; RBus 24; «Bus en Seine» 3A/3B/3C/10/19/23/25H
Invalides	C	1	Paris	63/93; Cars Air France 1
Issy	C5 C7	2	Issy-les-Moulineaux	123/190, TUVIM
Issy–Val de Seine	C5 C7	2	Issy-les-Moulineaux	39/126/189/323/394
Ivry-sur-Seine	C	2	Ivry sur Seine	125/323; N131
Javel	C5 C7	1	Paris	62/88
Joinville-le-Pont	A2	3	Joinville-le-Pont	101/106/108/110/112/201/281, NH
Juvisy	C4 C6 D4	4		285/385/399; N31/N131/N132/N130; Athiscars-RATP 485abcd/486/499; Daniel Mayer 2/3/4/5; CEAT
Avenue Foch	C1	1	Paris	Porte Dauphine; PC1
La Borne Blanche	D1	*	Orry-la-Ville La Chapelle en Serval	
La Courneuve–Aubervilliers	B	3	La Courneuve; Aubervilliers	143/150/249/250/256; N43
La Croix de Berny	B4	3	Antony	197/297/378; N21
La Défense	A1 A3 A5 E1	3	Puteaux, Courbevoie	73/141/144/159/161/174/178/262/272/275/276/278/360/378, Balabus; SLAG
La Ferté-Alais	D4	5	La Ferté-Alais	
La Hacquinière	B4	5	Bures-sur-Yvette, Gif-sur-Yvette	Mobicaps 20
La Norville-Saint-Germain-lès-Arpajon	C4	5		
La Plaine–Stade de France	B	2	La Plaine, Saint-Denis	139/173/153/253/552
La Varenne – Chennevières	A2	3	Saint-Maur-des-Fossés	111/112; CEAT 10.14
Laplace	B	2	Arcueil	57/323/580; N21
Lardy	C6	6	Lardy	N131
Le Blanc-Mesnil	B	3	Le Blanc-Mesnil	TRA 620
Le Bourget	B	3	Le Bourget Drancy	133/143/146/152, CIF and TRA 607ab/609ab/686/703, N42
Le Bras-de-Fer	D4 via Grigny	5	Évry, Lisses	Tice 401/402/404/408; SénartExpress 50
Le Chénay-Gagny	E2	4	Gagny	TRA 701
Le Grand Bourg	D4 via Ris	5	Évry	Tice 419
Le Guichet	B4	5	Orsay	Mobicaps 9; Albatrans 91-08
Le Mée	D2	5	Le Mée, Boissise la Bertrand, Boissettes	B, F, J
Le Parc de Saint-Maur	A2	3	Saint-Maur-des-Fossés	107/317
Le Raincy–Villemomble–Montfermeil	E2	4	Villemomble, Le Raincy, Montfermeil par TRA	114; TRA
Le Vert de Maisons	D2 D4	3	Maisons-Alfort, Alfortville	Paris Metro Paris Metro Line 15
Le Vésinet – Centre	A1	4	Le Vésinet	«Bus en Seine» 6A/6B/6C/20
Le Vésinet – Le Pecq	A1	4	Le Vésinet	Connex 21M/21 and «Bus en Seine» 3A/3C/7/19/20/22
Les Ardoines	C	3	Vitry sur Seine	182; N131
Les Baconnets	B4	4	Antony	
Les Boullereaux-Champigny	E4	3	Champigny-sur-Marne	
Les Grésillons	C1	3	Gennevilliers; Asnières	177; RiverPlazza; N150
Les Noues	D1	5	Goussainville	
Les Saules	C2	4	Orly	183; N131
Les Yvris–Noisy-le-Grand	E4	4	Noisy-le-Grand	
Lieusaint–Moissy	D2	5	Lieusaint, Moissy-Cramayel, St Pierre du Perray, Tigery, Réau	SénartBus 01/02/03/10/20/21/22/23/24/25/26/27/30; SénartExpress 50/51/55; Darche-Gros 14; SETRA 18
Lognes	A4	5	Lognes	211/321
Louvres	D1	5		CIF 25abce/36/113/114/702
Lozère	B4	4	Palaiseau	Mobicaps 1/19
Luxembourg	B	1	Paris	21/27/38/82/84/85
Magenta	E	1	Paris	Gare du Nord; Gare de l'Est; 26/38/42/43/48/65/302/350; ;;
Maisons-Alfort–Alfortville	D2 D4	3		103/217/372
Maisons-Laffitte	A3 A5	4	Maisons-Laffitte	262; Connex 2
Maisse	D4	6		
Malesherbes	D4	*		
Marne-la-Vallée–Chessy	A4	5	Chessy Disneyland Paris	Darche-Gros 17; «Seine et Marne express» 38; Marne and Morin 6/12/19/57/59/60/62
Marolles-en-Hurepoix	C6	5		N131
Massy–Palaiseau	B4 C2	4	Massy, Palaiseau	; 119/196/199/319/399; N63; CEAT; Daniel Mayer 10b/11abcd/12/153; SénartExpress 55; TransEssonne 95.04; Mobicaps 15/16
Massy–Verrières	B4 C2	4	Massy, Verrières-le-Buisson	Les Palladins
Melun	D2	6	Melun, Dammarie Les Lys, La Rochette, Vaux Le Penil, Rubelles, Voisenon	A, C, D, E, F, H, K, L; Darche-Gros 1/24/30/37; «Seine and marne express» 1
Mennecy	D4	6		
Meudon-Val Fleury	C5 C7	3	Meudon	162/169/289/389, TIM
Mitry–Claye	B5	5	Mitry-Mory	CIF 3/16/20/22
Montgeron-Crosne	D2	4	Montgeron, Crosne	STRAV E, Q
Montigny–Beauchamp	C1	4	Montigny-lès-Cormeilles; Beauchamp	Lacroix 30.05/30.09/30.10/30.18/30.31/30.33/30.35; Valoise 95.03a/95.19ac/95.21; N150
Moulin-Galant	D4	5		
Musée d'Orsay	C	1	Paris	24/68/69/73/84
Nanterre–La Folie	E1	3	Nanterre	
Nanterre-Préfecture	A1 A3 A5	3	Nanterre	160/358
Nanterre-Université	A1	3	Nanterre	267/304/357
Nanterre-Ville	A1	3	Nanterre	157/16/167/367/559a/559b
Nation	A	1	Paris	56/57/86/351
Neuilly–Porte Maillot	C1 E1	1	Paris	73/82, PC1, PC3/244, NA; Cars Air France 2
Neuilly-Plaisance	A4	3	Neuilly-Plaisance	113/114/203/214, NG
Neuville-Université	A3	5	Neuville-sur-Oise	STIVO 34S/49abc; Connex 14 and «Ville en Ville» 16/27
Nogent–Le Perreux	E4	3	Nogent-sur-Marne, Le Perreux-sur-Marne	Bus
Nogent-sur-Marne	A2	3	Nogent-sur-Marne, bois de Vincennes	113/114/120/210
Noisiel	A4	5	Noisiel	211/213/220; SETRA 10; cars Biziere 03-17
Noisy–Champs	A4	4	Noisy-le-Grand, Champs-sur-Marne, université de Marne-la-Vallée	213/312/320ab
Noisy-le-Grand – Mont d'Est	A4	4	Noisy-le-Grand – centre commercial	120/206/207/303/306/320ab
Noisy-le-Sec	E	3	Noisy-le-Sec	105
Orangis – Bois de l'Épine	D4 via Grigny	5	Ris Orangis	Tice 402/404/405/406/418
Orly-Ville	C2	4	Orly	183; AthisCar 3; N131
Orry-la-Ville-Coye	D1	*		
Orsay-Ville	B4	5	Orsay	Mobicaps 1/3/5/6/7/8; SAVAC 39.05/39.07/39.14
Ozoir-la-Ferrière	E4	5	Ozoir-la-Ferrière	Cars Biziere
Palaiseau	B4	4	Palaiseau	Mobicaps 1/14
Palaiseau – Villebon	B4	4	Palaiseau, Villebon-sur-Yvette	Mobicaps 1/14/18/19
Pantin	E	2	Pantin	170
Parc de Sceaux	B4	3	Antony, Sceaux	
Parc des Expositions	B3	4	Villepinte	349/350, TRA, PNA, TransVO 23 and CIF 9/9A/39/349
Paris–Austerlitz	C	1	Paris	; Aqualys; 24/57/61/63/89/91; N131
Paris–Gare de Lyon	A D	1	Paris	20/24/29/57/61/63/65/87/91; cars Air France 4
Paris–Nord	B D	1	Paris	, , Picardie,; Magenta; 26/30/31/38/42/43/48/54/65/302/350; OpenTour
Pereire–Levallois	C1	1	Paris	84/92/93, NB;
Pierrefitte–Stains	D1	4	Pierrefitte Stains	268/254
Pierrelaye	C1	5	Pierrelaye	Lacroix 30.28; Valoise 95.19ab; N150
Poissy	A5	5	Poissy	Connex 5/11/14 Hourtoule 242.04; «Ville en Ville» 16; «Vernon cars» 3 and CSO 2/3/4/9/10/11/14/15/20/21/24/25/26
Pont de l'Alma	C	1	Paris	42/63/82
Pont de Rungis – Aéroport d'Orly	C2	4	Thiais-Orly	Thiais–Orly; 183/292/319; N31
Pont du Garigliano	C5 C7	1	Paris	PC1
Pontoise	C1	5	Pontoise	STIVO 34N/34S/36/43/44/45/56/57/58; Giraux 1 and Bus95 95.04/95.05/95.06/95.07/95.08/95.15/95.16/95.41; N150
Porchefontaine	C5	4	Versailles	171; Phebus U; N121
Port-Royal	B	1	Paris	83/91
Porte de Clichy	C1	1	Paris	54/73, PC3/138/173; N15/N51
Ris-Orangis	D4 via Ris	5		Tice 407
Robinson	B2	3	Sceaux, Châtenay-Malabry	128/179/190/192/194/195/595; N62/N63
Roissy-en-Brie	E4	5	Roissy-en-Brie	
Rosa Parks	E	1	Paris	Tramways in Île-de-France Île-de-France tramway Line 3b Bus
Rosny–Bois-Perrier	E4	3	Rosny-sous-Bois	Paris Metro Paris Metro Line 11 Bus
Rosny-sous-Bois	E4	3	Rosny-sous-Bois	and Titus 1/2/3/4/5
Rueil-Malmaison	A1	3	Rueil-Malmaison	144/158/241/244/367; Connex + RATP 467; «Traverciel» 27A/27B and «Bus en Seine» 4E
Rungis-La Fraternelle	C2	4	Rungis	319
Saint-Germain-en-Laye	A1	4	Saint-Germain-en-Laye	258; Connex 1/2/5, A, B, BC, C, M, S, T; CSO 3/21/23/24/27; «Ville en Ville"; «Seine and forêt» 10/13/15 and «Bus en Seine» 7SG
Saint-Chéron	C4	6		N131
Saint-Cyr	C7	5	Saint-Cyr	SqyBus 401; Phebus 1/2/3/4/5/6/7, P; Hourtoule 10/11; N121
Saint-Denis	D	3	Saint-Denis	154/170/174/178/261
Saint-Gratien	C1	4	Saint-Gratien	138/238/261; Valmy 15A; N150
Saint-Martin-d'Étampes	C6	6		
Saint-Maur – Créteil	A2	3	Saint-Maur-des-Fossés	107/111/112/306, TVM
Saint-Michel–Notre-Dame	B C	1	Paris	21/24/27/81/85/96
Saint-Michel-sur-Orge	C4 C6	5		Daniel Mayer 2ab/9/16; N131
Saint-Ouen	C1	2	Saint-Ouen	173/174/340
Saint-Ouen-l'Aumône	C1	5	Saint-Ouen-l'Aumône	STIVO 34S/56/57/58; N150
Saint-Ouen-l'Aumône-Liesse	C1	5	Saint-Ouen-l'Aumône	STIVO 34S and valoise 95.20; N150
Saint-Quentin-en-Yvelines–Montigny-le-Bretonneux	C7	5	Montigny-le-Bretonneux	SqyBus 402/415/418/419/460/461/463/464/475/501/502/503/505; «Ville en Ville» 16; Hourtoule 4/10/78; SAVAC 307; Phebus Yexpress; Trans Essonne 91.06/91.10; N121
Saint-Rémy-lès-Chevreuse	B4	5	Saint-Rémy-lès-Chevreuse	SqyBus 437/438/463 and SAVAC 39.03/39.10/39.13/39.17/39.27/39.31/39.103/39.203/39.303/39.430/262A
Sainte-Geneviève-des-Bois	C4 C6	5	Sainte-Geneviève-des-Bois; Villemoisson-sur-Orge; Villiers-sur-Orge	Daniel Mayer 6ab/11b/17; Genovebus 1/2/3/4 N131
Sartrouville	A3 A5	4	Sartrouville	RBus 1/5/9; «Bus en Seine» 7/7SG/22/23/25S; RBus-Lacroix 19
Savigny-le-Temple – Nandy	D2	5	Savigny le Temple, Nandy	SénartBus 30/31/33/34/35/36/37/38/60A/60B; SénartExpress 50
Savigny-sur-Orge	C4 C6	4	Savigny-sur-Orge	492; Daniel Mayer 21abc/22; N131
Sceaux	B2	3	Sceaux	
Sermaise	C4	6		N131
Sevran Beaudottes	B3	4	Sevran	147; TRA 607ab/618/634; CIF 1/15/44/45
Sevran–Livry	B5	4	Sevran	147; N41/N140; TRA 603/618/623
Stade de France–Saint-Denis	D	2	Saint-Denis	Saint-Denis-Pleyel; 139/17
Sucy – Bonneuil	A2	4	Sucy-en-Brie	308/393, NM; SITUS 1/2/3/4/5/10; CETRA-CEAT 201.14
Survilliers-Fosses	D1	5	Fosses	CIF 28/28B29/29C/60/114/117
Torcy	A4	5	Torcy	211/221/421; AMV 19/21/25/29; Cars Biziere 03.18
Tournan	E4	4	Tournan-en-Brie	Darche-Gros 30
Val d'Europe	A4	5	Chessy Centre commercial Val d'Europe	AMV 50; Marne and Morin ??
Val de Fontenay	A4 E4	3	Fontenay-sous-Bois	116/118/122/124/301; Titus 5 and TRA 702
Versailles Chantiers	C7	4	Versailles	Phébus ARC, B, BAK, G, K, L, LFA, P, R, X, Xexpress, W, Texpress, Z; SAVAC 39.12/39.22/39.438/262A/262B/262G/307; SqyBus 440; Connex; Hourtoule; N121
Versailles Château Rive Gauche	C5	4	Versailles	Phébus B, BAK, DHL, F, E, K, P, Z; SAVAC 39.22/39.12/262A/262B; STAVO 4401; SqyBus 401/439/440; Connex; Hourtoule 10/11; N121
Vert-Galant	B5	4	Villepinte Tremblay en France	TRA 607a/619/642ab/670; CIF DUO Jaune, DUO Vert, Duo Bleu/9/9A/15/22/39/45, Alobus bleu
Vigneux-sur-Seine	D4	4	Vigneux sur Seine, Draveil	
Villeneuve–Prairie	D2 D4	3	Choisy le Roi, Créteil	
Villeneuve-Triage	D2 D4	4	Villeneuve Saint Georges, Choisy le Roi	182; STRAV L
Villeneuve-le-Roi	C4 C6	4	Villeneuve-le-Roi	AthisCars «Bord de l'eau»; N131
Villeneuve-Saint-Georges	D2 D4	4	Villeneuve-Saint-Georges	Athiscar 3/8; STRAV A, B, G, H, J1, J2, K, L, N
Villeparisis–Mitry-le-Neuf	B5	5	Mitry-Mory	CIF 1/9/9A/13/16/17/18/19/71/116/171, DUO Vert
Villepinte	B3	4	Villepinte	TRA 615/617/642/683
Villiers-le-Bel–Gonesse–Arnouville	D1	4	Arnouville	268/270/370; TransVO 22/23/23Zi/34/35/36/37
Villiers-sur-Marne–Le Plessis-Trévise	E4	4	Villiers-sur-Marne	
Vincennes	A2 A4	2	Vincennes	56/115/118/124/215/318
Viroflay Rive Gauche	C5 C7	3	Viroflay	Phebus D, U; N121
Viry–Châtillon	D4	4	Viry–Châtillon	Daniel Mayer «Pass Partout»
Vitry-sur-Seine	C	3	Vitry-sur-Seine	180; N131
Yerres	D2	4		STRAV F1, F2, F3, I

== See also ==
- List of Paris Métro stations
- List of Transilien stations
- List of Paris railway stations
- List of tram stops in Île-de-France
