= Le Vert de Maisons station =

Railway station in France

Le Vert de Maisons
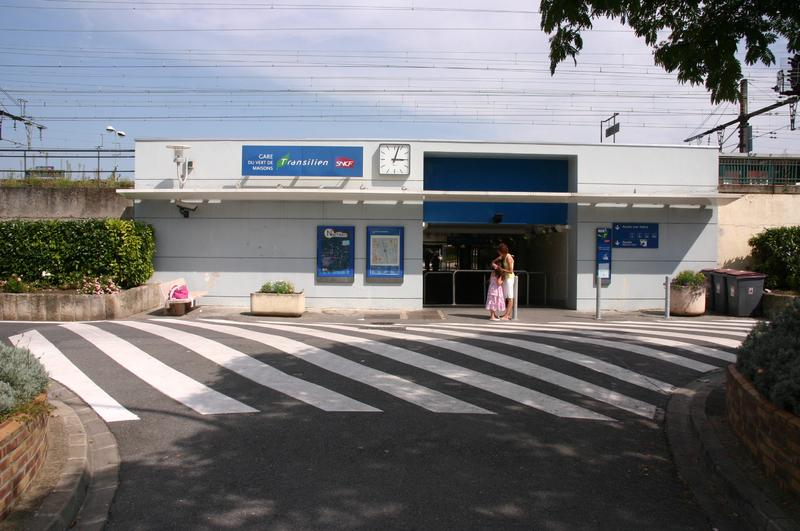
- Le Vert de Maisons railway station

General information
- Location: Alfortville / Maisons-Alfort; France
- Coordinates: 48°47′18″N 2°25′58″E
- Operator: RER D: SNCF; Line 15: ORA (RATP Dev, Alstom & ComfortDelGro)
- Line: RER D: Paris–Marseille railway
- Platforms: RER D: 1 island platform, 2 side platforms; Line 15: 2 side platforms
- Tracks: RER D: 6; Line 15: 2

Construction
- Accessible: RER D: No; Line 15: Yes

Other information
- Station code: 87681247
- Fare zone: 3

History
- Opened: 28 May 1955

Passengers
- 2024: 3,655,445

Services
Preceding station	RER	Following station
Maisons-Alfort–Alfortville towards Villiers-le-Bel–Gonesse–Arnouville	RER D	Créteil-Pompadour towards Corbeil-Essonnes
Maisons-Alfort–Alfortville towards Orry-la-Ville–Coye	RER D	Créteil-Pompadour towards Corbeil-Essonnes
Maisons-Alfort–Alfortville towards Creil	RER D	Créteil-Pompadour towards Corbeil-Essonnes

Future services
Preceding station	Paris Metro	Following station
Les Ardoines towards Pont de Sèvres	Line 15 (autumn 2027)	Créteil–L'Échat towards Noisy–Champs
Location

Le Vert de Maisons (French pronunciation: [l(ə) vɛʁ d(ə) mɛzɔ̃]; lit. 'The Green of Houses') is a railway station in Maisons-Alfort and Alfortville, Val-de-Marne, Île-de-France, France. The station was opened on 28 May 1955 and is on the Paris–Marseille railway. The station is served by Paris's express suburban rail system, the RER (Line D). In the future, Line 15 of the Paris Metro will stop here. The train services are operated by SNCF.

== RER D ==
The station is served by the following service(s):

- Local services (RER D) Paris–Villeneuve-Saint-Georges–Juvisy–Évry-Courcouronnes Centre–Corbeil Essonnes
- Local services (RER D) Creil–Orry-la-Ville–Goussainville–Saint-Denis–Paris–Villeneuve-Saint-Georges–Juvisy–Évry–Corbeil Essonnes

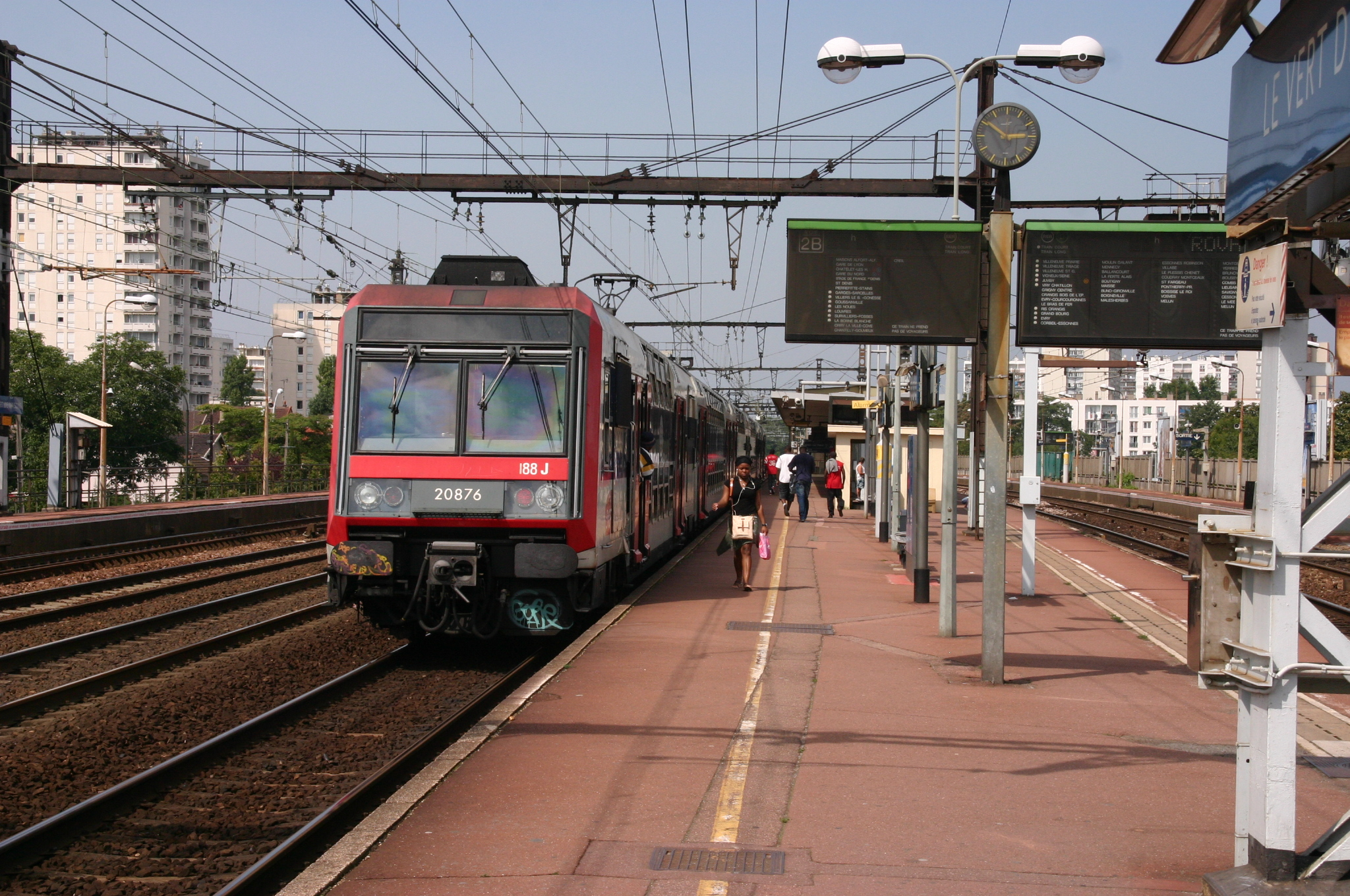
An RER train at the station

== Line 15 ==
Le Vert de Maisons will soon become a transfer point between the RER network and the Paris Metro network, as Line 15 will open its southern section in autumn 2027 as part of the Grand Paris Express project.

== See also ==
- List of Réseau Express Régional stations
