= Villeneuve-Triage station =

Railway station in Villeneuve-Saint-Georges, France

Villeneuve-Triage
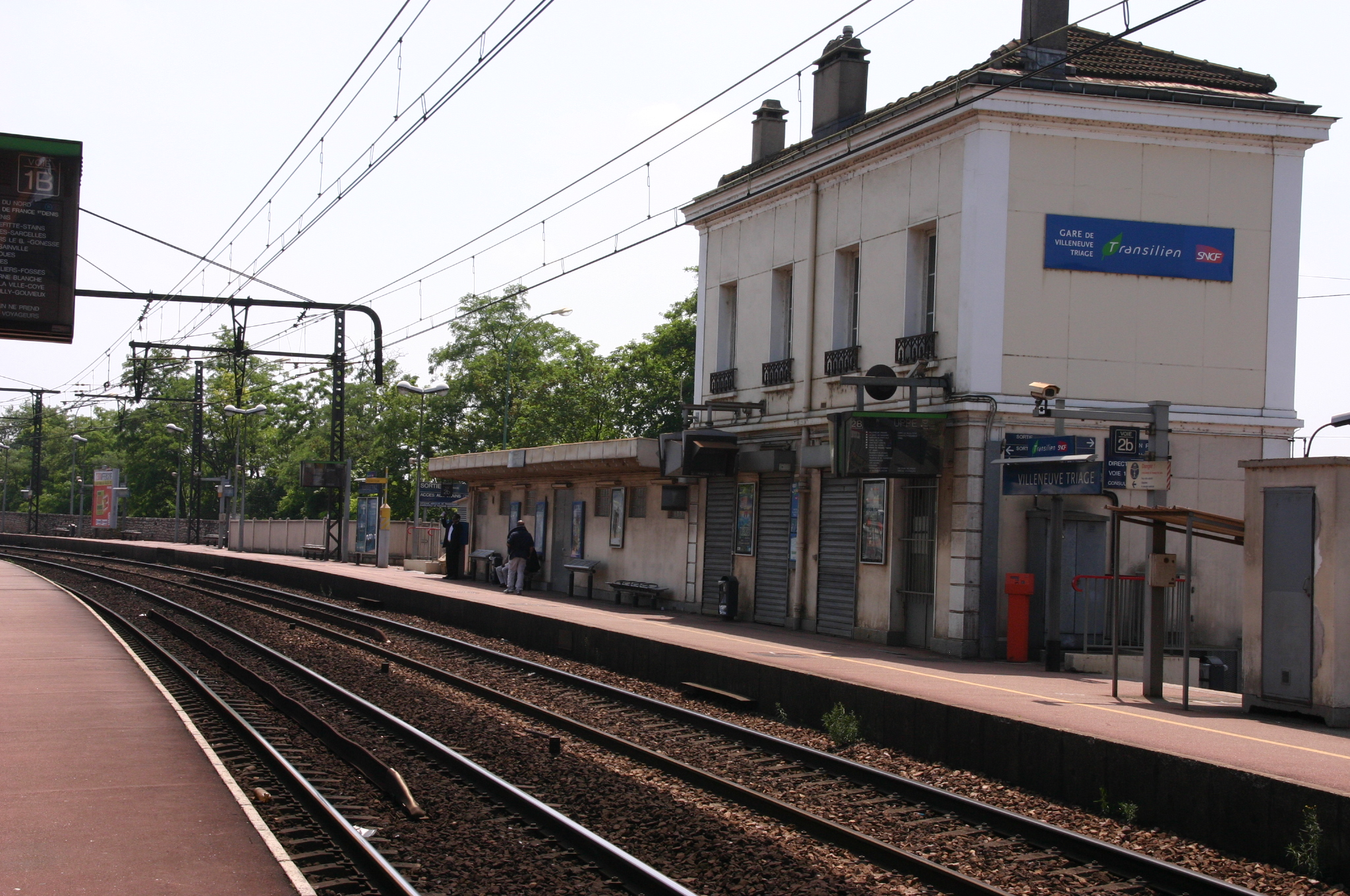
- Villeneuve-Triage railway station

General information
- Location: Villeneuve-Saint-Georges, Val-de-Marne, Île-de-France, France
- Coordinates: 48°44′42″N 2°26′19″E
- Line: Paris–Marseille railway
- Platforms: 2

Other information
- Station code: 87681809
- Fare zone: 4 Île-de-France

Passengers
- 2024: 1,467,225

Services
Preceding station	RER	Following station
Créteil-Pompadour towards Orry-la-Ville–Coye	RER D	Villeneuve-Saint-Georges towards Corbeil-Essonnes
Créteil-Pompadour towards Creil	RER D	Villeneuve-Saint-Georges towards Corbeil-Essonnes
Location

Villeneuve-Triage is a railway station in Villeneuve-Saint-Georges, Val-de-Marne, Paris, France. The station is on the Paris–Marseille railway. The station is served by Paris' express suburban rail system, the RER. The train services are operated by SNCF.

== Train services ==
The station is served by the following service(s):

- Local services (RER D) Paris–Villeneuve St Georges–Juvisy–Évry Centre–Corbeil Essonnes
- Local services (RER D) Creil–Orry la Ville–Gouissainville–St Denis–Paris–Villeneuve St Georges–Juvisy–Évry–Corbeil Essonnes

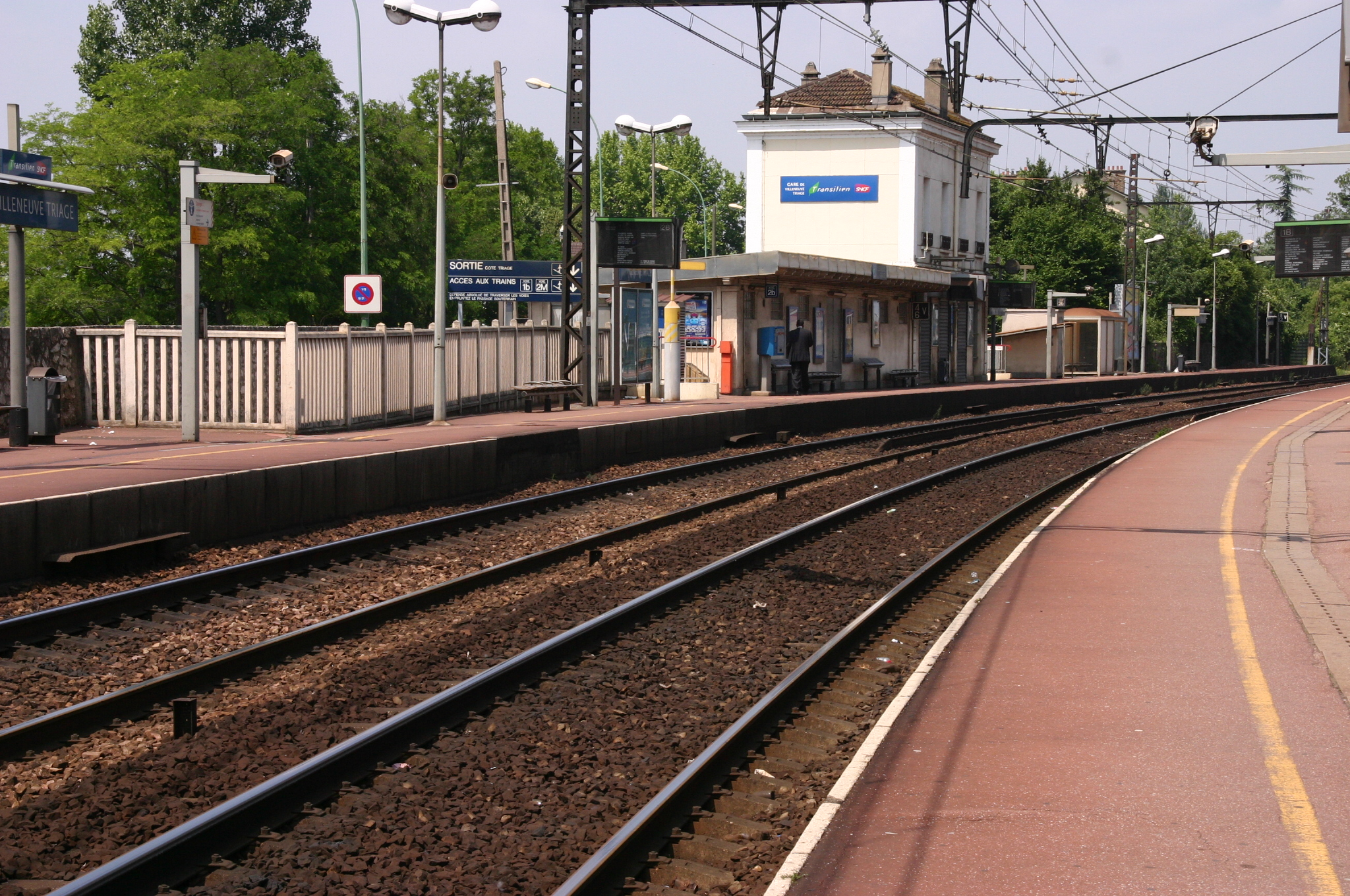
View of the platforms

== See also ==
- List of stations of the Paris RER
