= Lieusaint–Moissy station =

French railway station

Lieusaint–Moissy
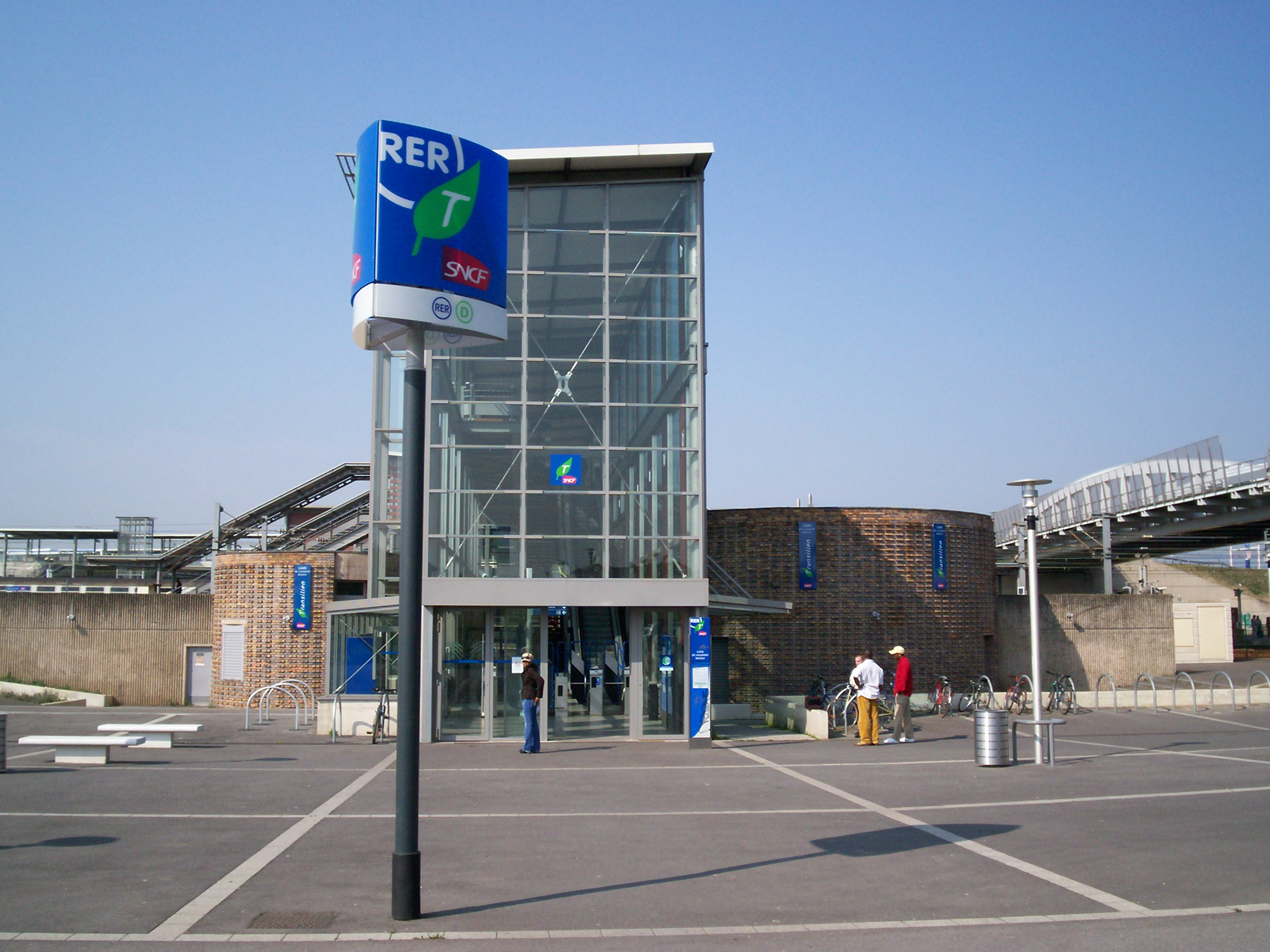

General information
- Location: Lieusaint, Seine-et-Marne, Île-de-France, France
- Coordinates: 48°37′42″N 2°34′10″E
- Line: Paris–Marseille railway RER D

Other information
- Station code: 87682153

Passengers
- 2024: 6,914,078

Services
Preceding station	RER	Following station
Combs-la-Ville–Quincy towards Goussainville	RER D	Savigny-le-Temple–Nandy towards Melun
Location

Lieusaint–Moissy is a railway station in Lieusaint, in the department of Seine-et-Marne, France. It is served by RER Line D commuter trains.

== See also ==
- List of stations of the Paris RER
