= Vigneux-sur-Seine station =

Train station (Paris RER)

Vigneux-sur-Seine
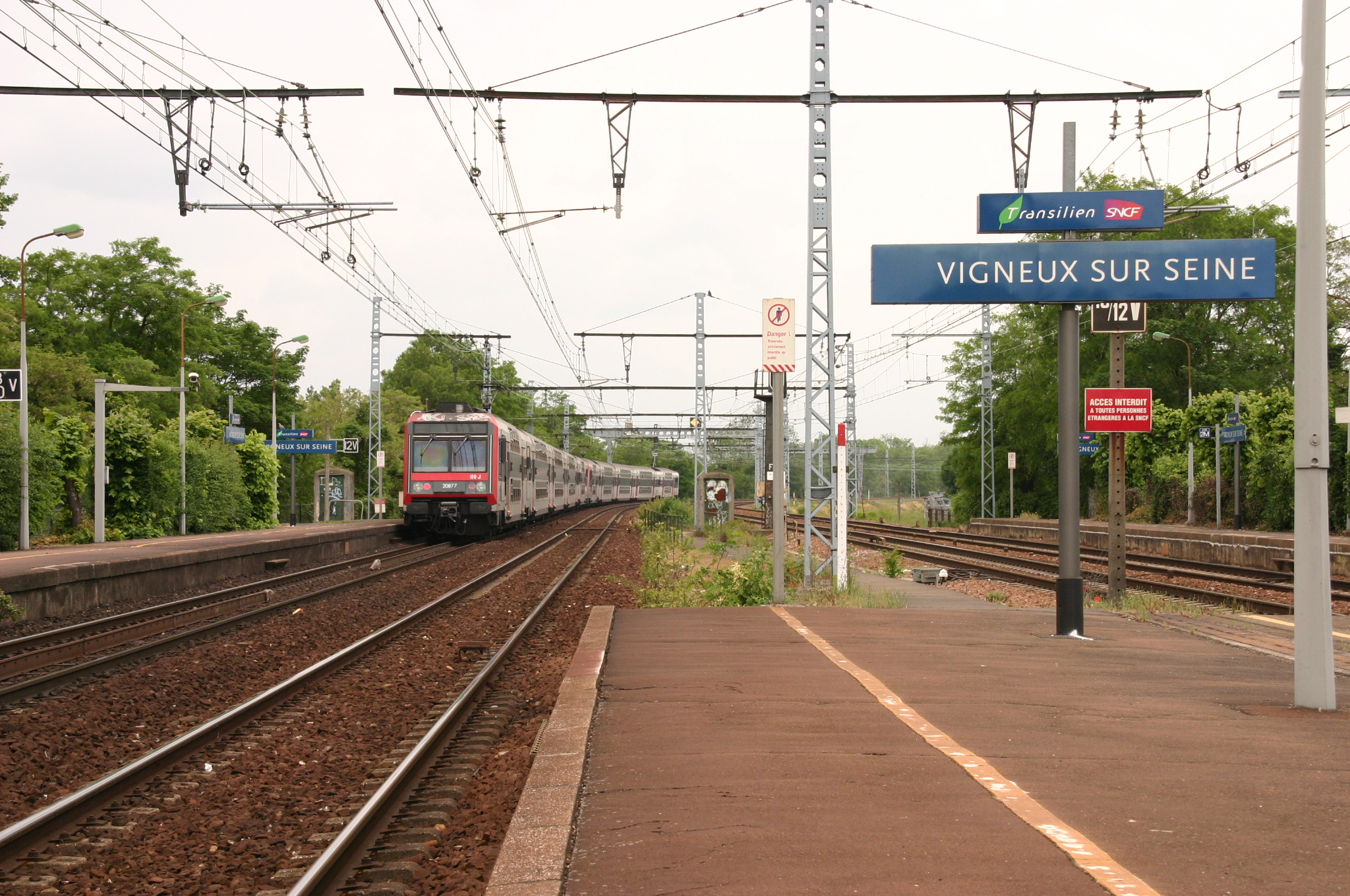
- A train arriving at Gare de Vigneux-sur-Seine

General information
- Location: Vigneux-sur-Seine, Essonne, Île-de-France, France
- Coordinates: 48°25′23″N 2°14′43″E
- Elevation: 40 m (130 ft)
- Operator: SNCF
- Lines: Villeneuve-Saint-Georges–Montargis railway RER D
- Platforms: 3 (2 side and 1 central)
- Tracks: 4
- Train operators: SNCF
- Connections: Noctilien Line N135(see here:)

Other information
- Station code: 87681304
- Fare zone: 4

History
- Opened: 1973

Passengers
- 2024: 5,792,788

Services
Preceding station	RER	Following station
Villeneuve-Saint-Georges towards Creil	RER D	Juvisy towards Corbeil-Essonnes
Location

Vigneux-sur-Seine is a railway station in Vigneux-sur-Seine, Essonne, Île-de-France, France. The station was opened in 1973 and is on the Villeneuve-Saint-Georges–Montargis railway. The station is served by the RER Line D, which is operated by SNCF. The station serves the commune of Vigneux-sur-Seine.

== Station info ==
Erected at an altitude at 40 m above sea level, the station is at the 17.832 kilometer point of the Villeneuve-Saint-Georges–Montargis railway, between the stations of Villeneuve-Saint-Georges and Juvisy. The station serves 5,518,200 passengers (2014) annually.

== Train services ==
- Local services (RER D) Creil–Orry-la-Ville–Coye–Goussainville–Gare de Lyon–Villeneuve-Saint-Georges–Vigneux-sur-Seine–Évry–Corbeil-Essonnes
- Local services (RER D) Villiers-le-Bel–Gonesse–Saint-Denis–Gare de Lyon–Villeneuve-Saint-Georges–Vigneux-sur-Seine–Évry–Corbeil-Essonnes
