= Villeneuve-Saint-Georges station =

Railway station in Villeneuve-Saint-Georges, France

Villeneuve-Saint-Georges
- Gare de Villeneuve-Saint-Georges main building

General information
- Location: 94190 Villeneuve-Saint-Georges, Val-de-Marne, Île-de-France, France
- Coordinates: 48°43′48″N 2°26′46″E
- Elevation: 36 m (118 ft)
- Operator: SNCF
- Lines: Paris–Marseille railway Villeneuve-Saint-Georges–Montargis railway RER D
- Platforms: 4 (1 side and 3 central)
- Tracks: 8
- Train operators: SNCF
- Connections: Noctilien Lines N132, N134 and N135

Other information
- Station code: 87681825
- Fare zone: 4

History
- Opened: 12 August 1849; 177 years ago

Passengers
- 2024: 16,901,268

Services
Preceding station	RER	Following station
Créteil-Pompadour towards Goussainville	RER D	Montgeron-Crosne towards Melun
Villeneuve-Triage towards Orry-la-Ville–Coye	RER D	Vigneux-sur-Seine towards Corbeil-Essonnes
Villeneuve-Triage towards Creil	RER D	Vigneux-sur-Seine towards Corbeil-Essonnes
Villeneuve-Triage towards Villiers-le-Bel–Gonesse–Arnouville	RER D	Vigneux-sur-Seine towards Corbeil-Essonnes
Preceding station	Ouigo	Following station
Paris-Bercy Terminus	Train Classique	Melun towards Lyon-Perrache
Location

Villeneuve-Saint-Georges is a station in Villeneuve-Saint-Georges, Val-de-Marne, Île-de-France, France. The station was opened on 12 August 1849, and it is on the Paris-Marseille railway and the Villeneuve-Saint-Georges–Montargis railway. This station, together with the station of Villeneuve-Triage, serves the commune of Villeneuve-Saint-Georges.

== Station info ==
The station of Villeneuve-Saint-Georges was opened on 12 August 1849. At the elevation of 36 meters above sea level, it is at the 14.386 kilometer point of the Paris–Marseille railway and is the northern terminus of the Villeneuve-Saint-Georges–Montargis railway. It serves 14,277,600 passengers per year, and during a survey in 2017, 14,889,829 people used the station.

== Train services ==
- intercity services (Ouigo) Paris – Dijon – Lyon
- Local services (RER D) Creil–Orry-la-Ville–Coye–Goussainville–Saint-Denis–Gare de Lyon–Villeneuve-Saint-Georges–Juvisy–Corbeil–Essonnes
- Local services (RER D) Goussainville–Saint-Denis–Gare de Lyon–Villeneuve-Saint-Georges–Montgeron-Crosne–Combs-la-Ville–Quincy–Melun

== Extension of Paris Métro Line 18 to the East ==
During the meeting of the steering committee of the Orly airport station, on 3 May 2016, the Grand Paris company announced that in order not to mortgage the future, protective measures will be taken at the station Orly Airport to create a possible extension of the Paris Métro Line 18 to the east of the line beyond 2030. This measure is taken after requests from local elected officials of Val-de-Marne and Essonne to connect Villeneuve-Saint-Georges station, located on RER Line D, to the Orly Airport area to facilitate its access. Other elected officials want the extension to go to Boissy-Saint-Léger station, located on RER Line A, to the same reasons. Finally, the department of Val-de-Marne via the Orbival association will mobilize elected officials to reflect on this extension.
