= Les Ardoines station =

Railway station in Paris, France

Les Ardoines
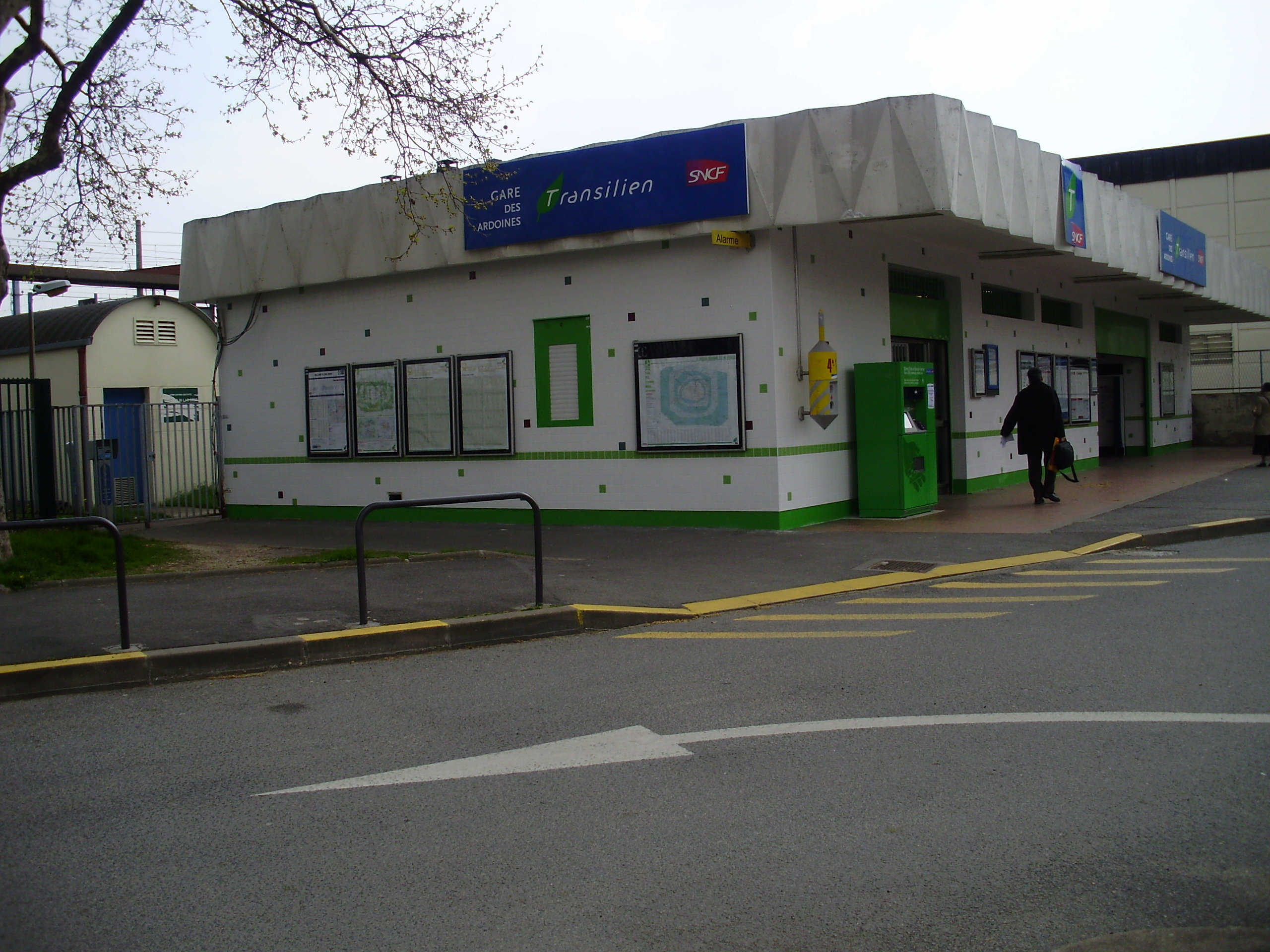
- Les Ardoines station passenger building

General information
- Location: Rue Léon-Geffroy; Vitry-sur-Seine; France
- Coordinates: 48°46′57″N 2°24′34″E
- Elevation: RER C: 33 m (108 ft)
- Operated by: RER D: SNCF; Line 15: ORA (RATP Dev, Alstom & ComfortDelGro)
- Line: RER C: Paris–Bordeaux railway
- Platforms: RER C: 2 side platforms; Line 15: 2 side platforms
- Tracks: RER D: 4; Line 15: 2

Construction
- Accessible: RER C: No; Line 15: Yes

Other information
- Station code: 87492108
- Fare zone: 3

History
- Opened: 25 September 1977

Passengers
- 2024: 2,509,865

Services
Preceding station	RER	Following station
Vitry-sur-Seine towards Pontoise, Versailles Château Rive Gauche or Saint-Quentin-en-Yvelines	RER C	Choisy-le-Roi towards Massy-Palaiseau, Dourdan-la-Forêt or Saint-Martin-d'Étampes

Future services
Preceding station	Paris Metro	Following station
Mairie de Vitry-sur-Seine towards Pont de Sèvres	Line 15 (autumn 2027)	Le Vert de Maisons towards Noisy–Champs
Location

Les Ardoines station (French pronunciation: [lez‿aʁdwan]) is a station in Paris' express suburban rail system, the RER. As part of the Grand Paris Express project, Paris Metro Line 15 will begin service here by autumn 2027. It is on the Paris–Bordeaux railway. It serves the commune of Vitry-sur-Seine, in the Val-de-Marne department.

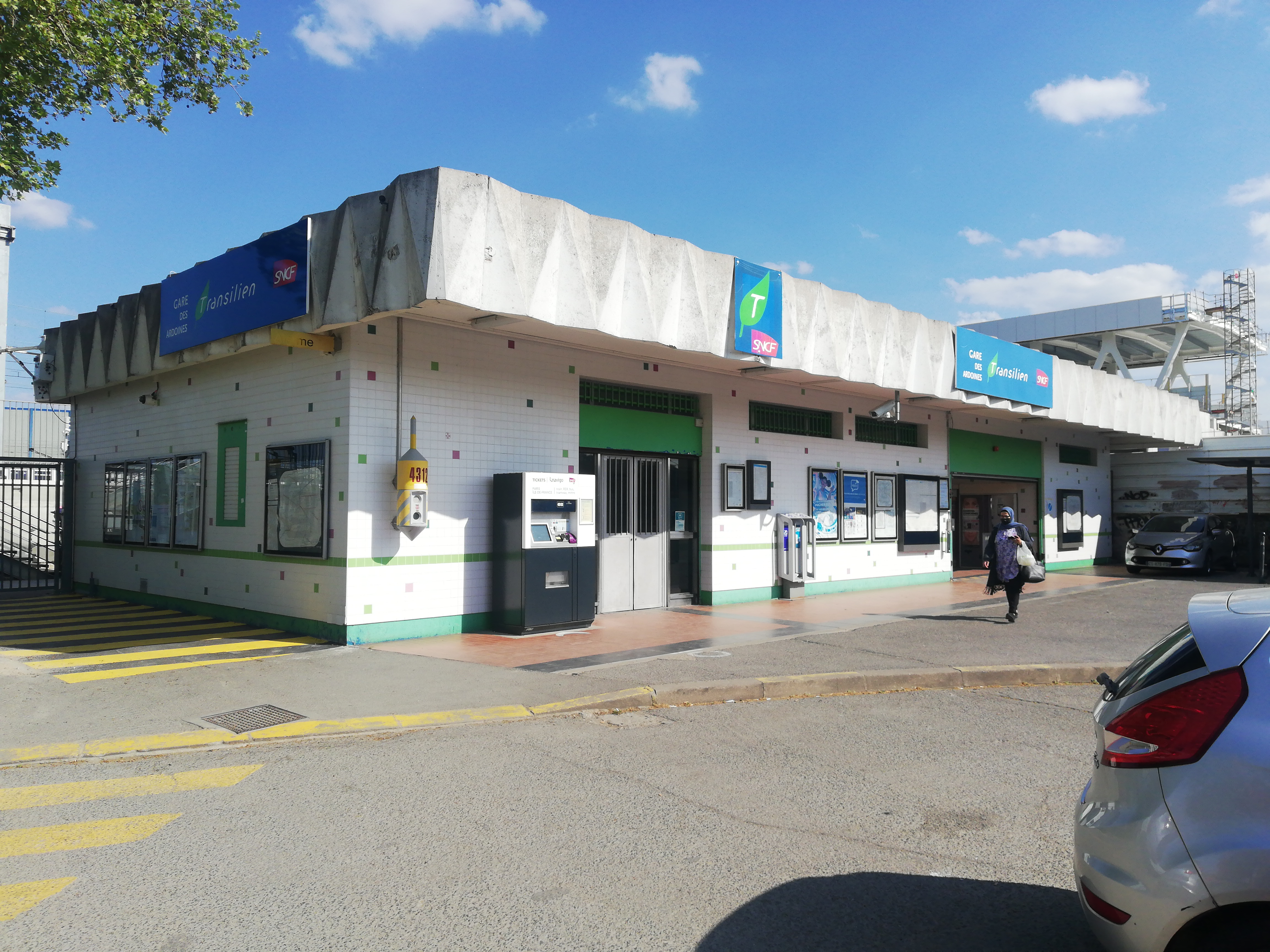
RER Entrance

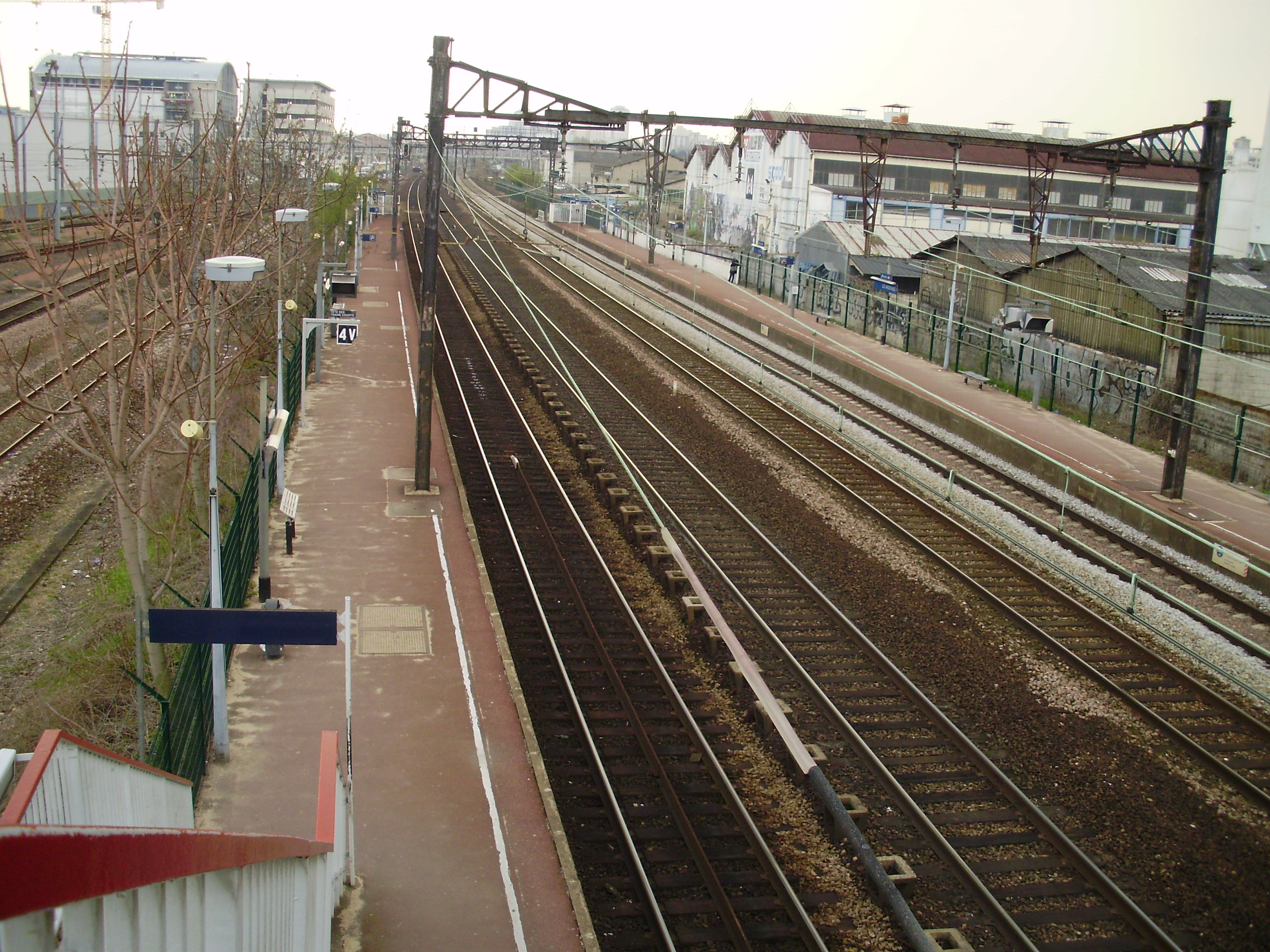
View from footbridge

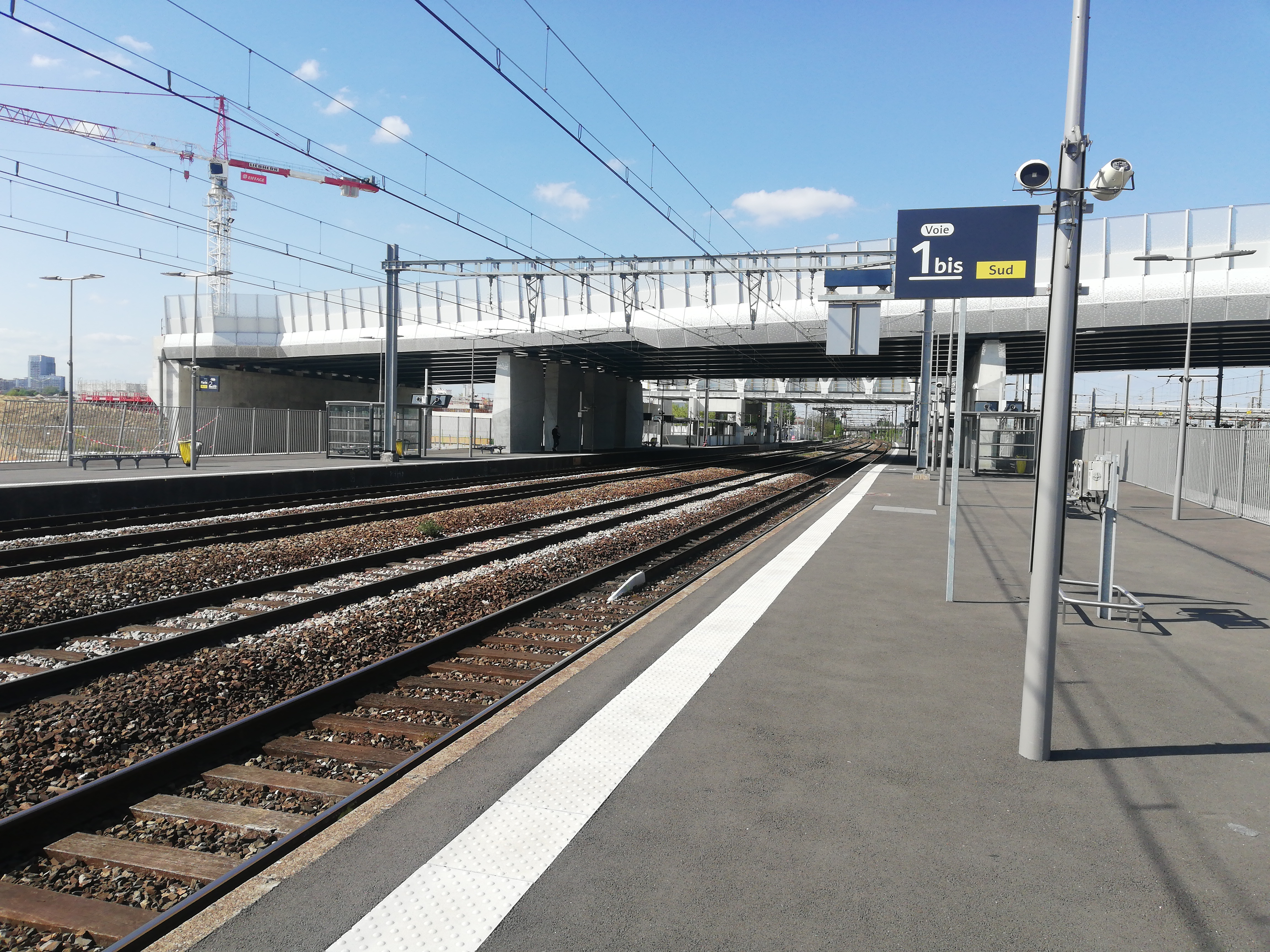
RER C Platforms

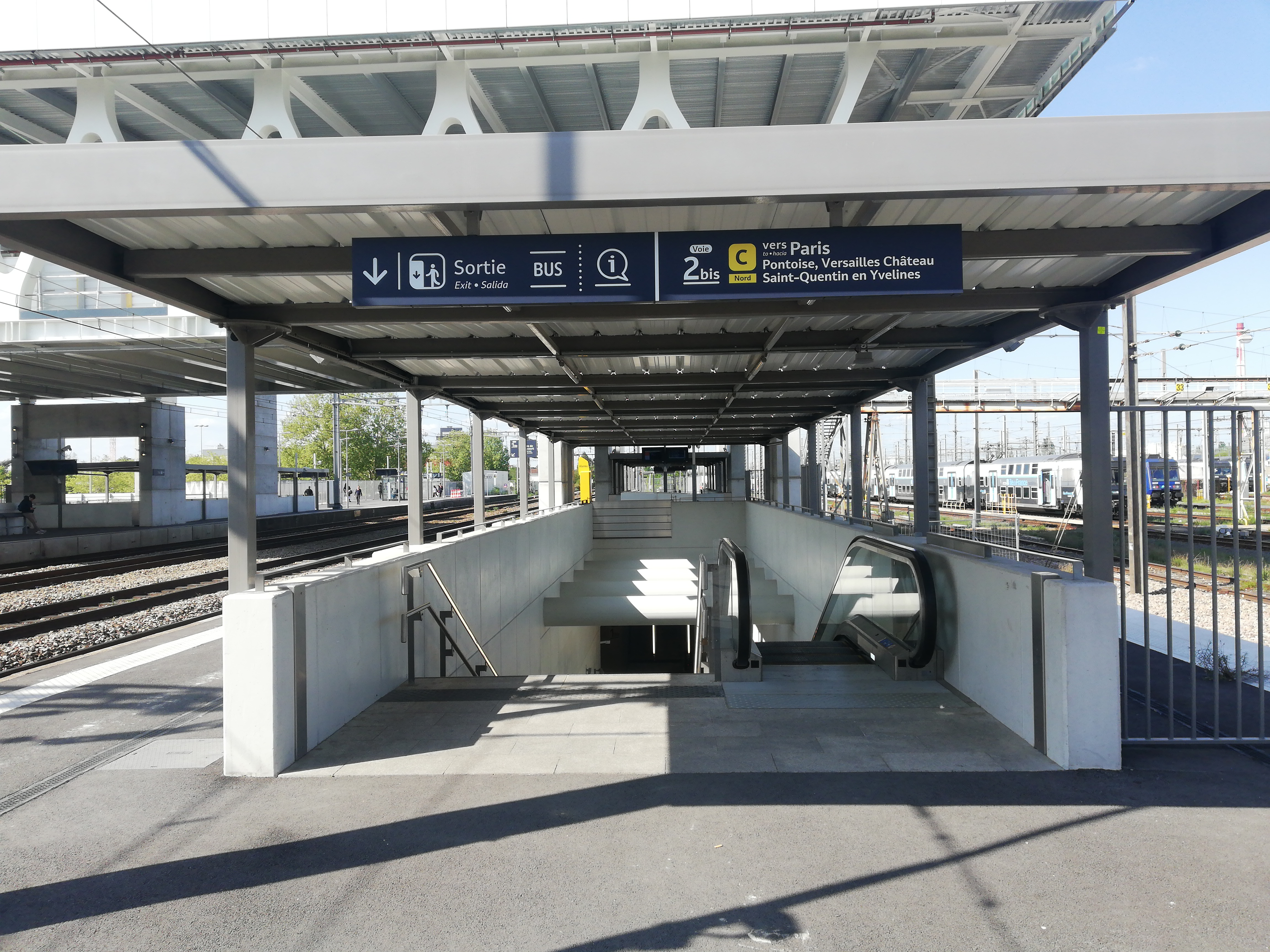
Entrance to underpass

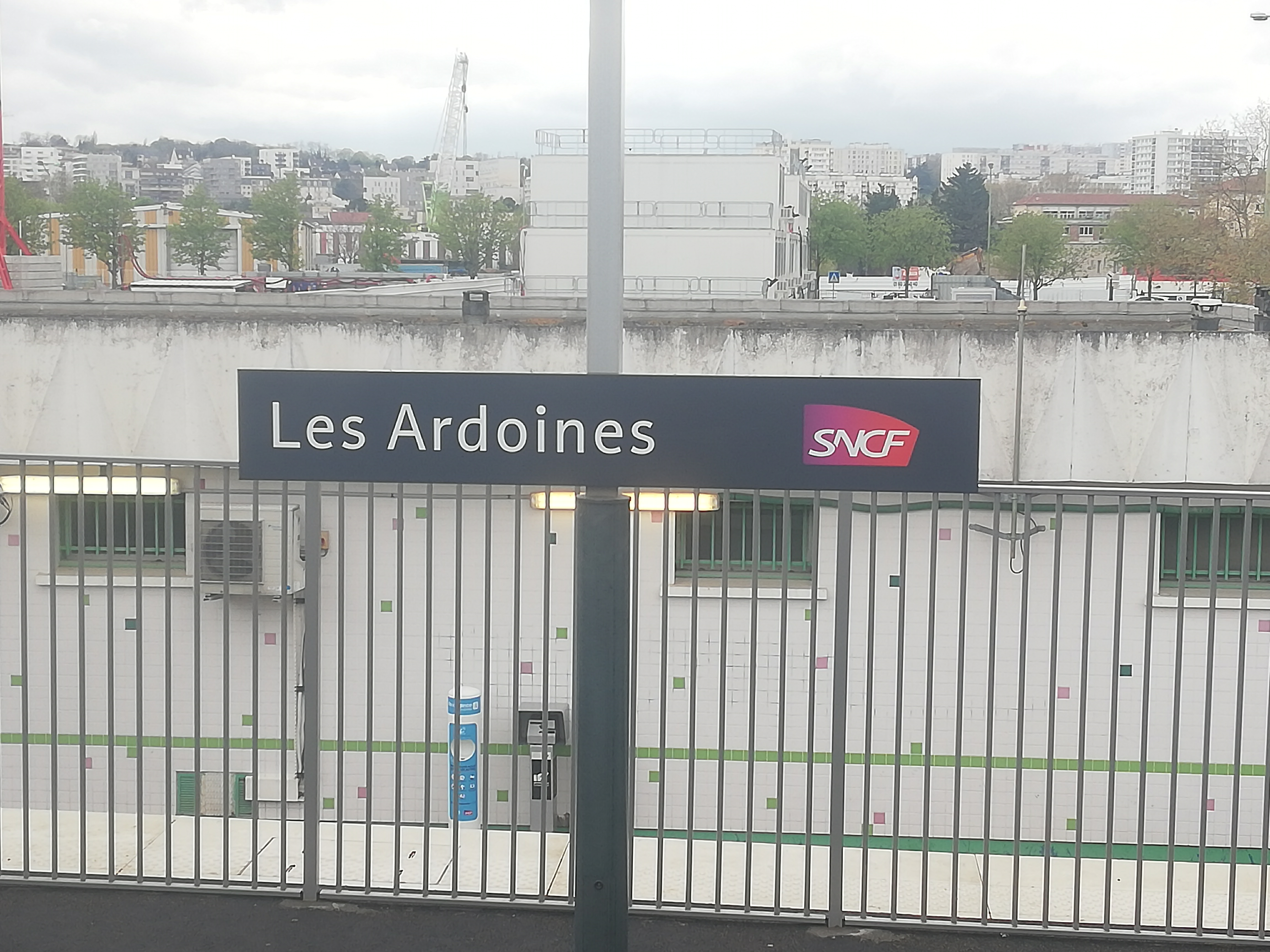
Station sign

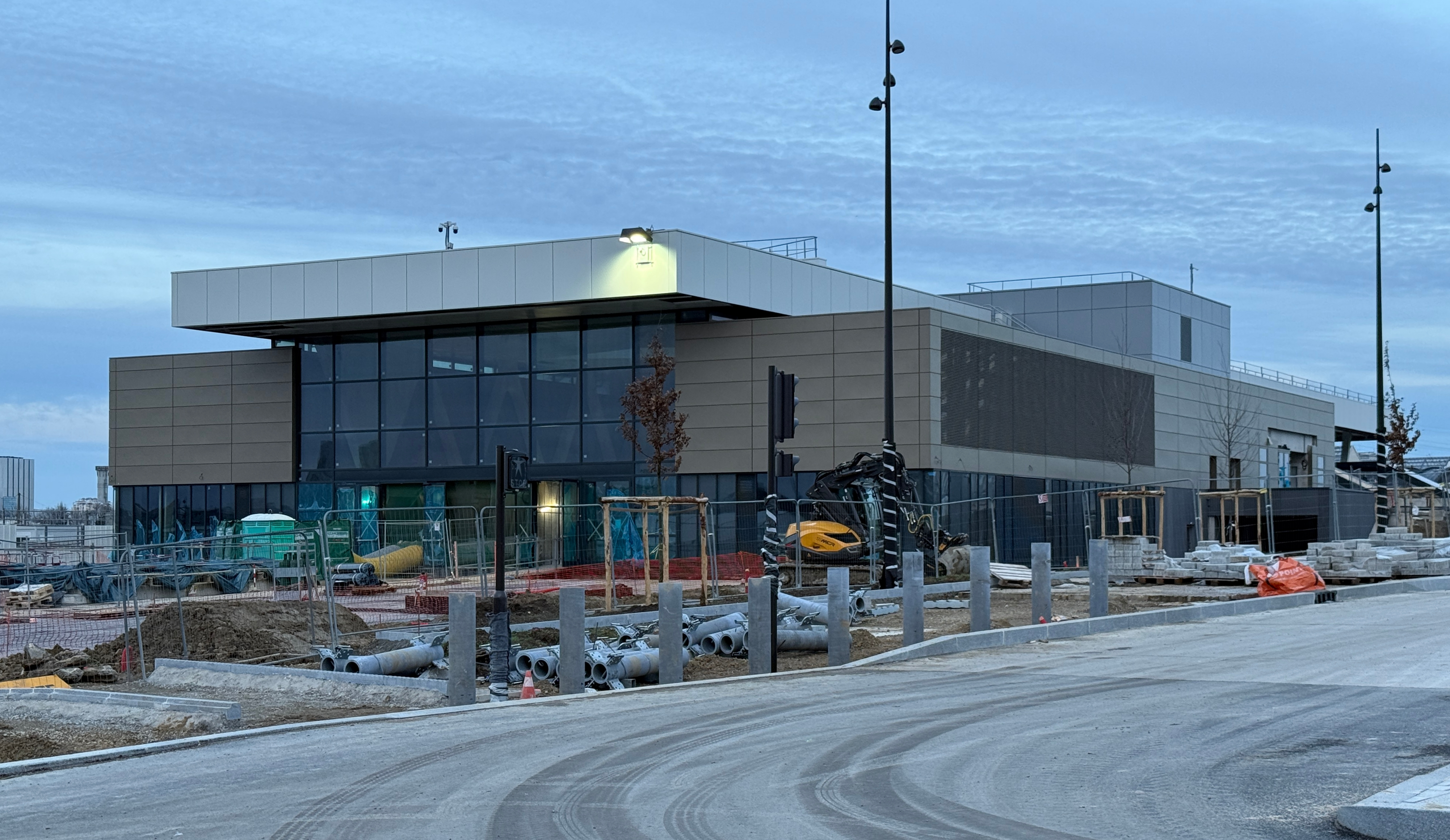
Line 15 Entrance under construction in Feb 2026

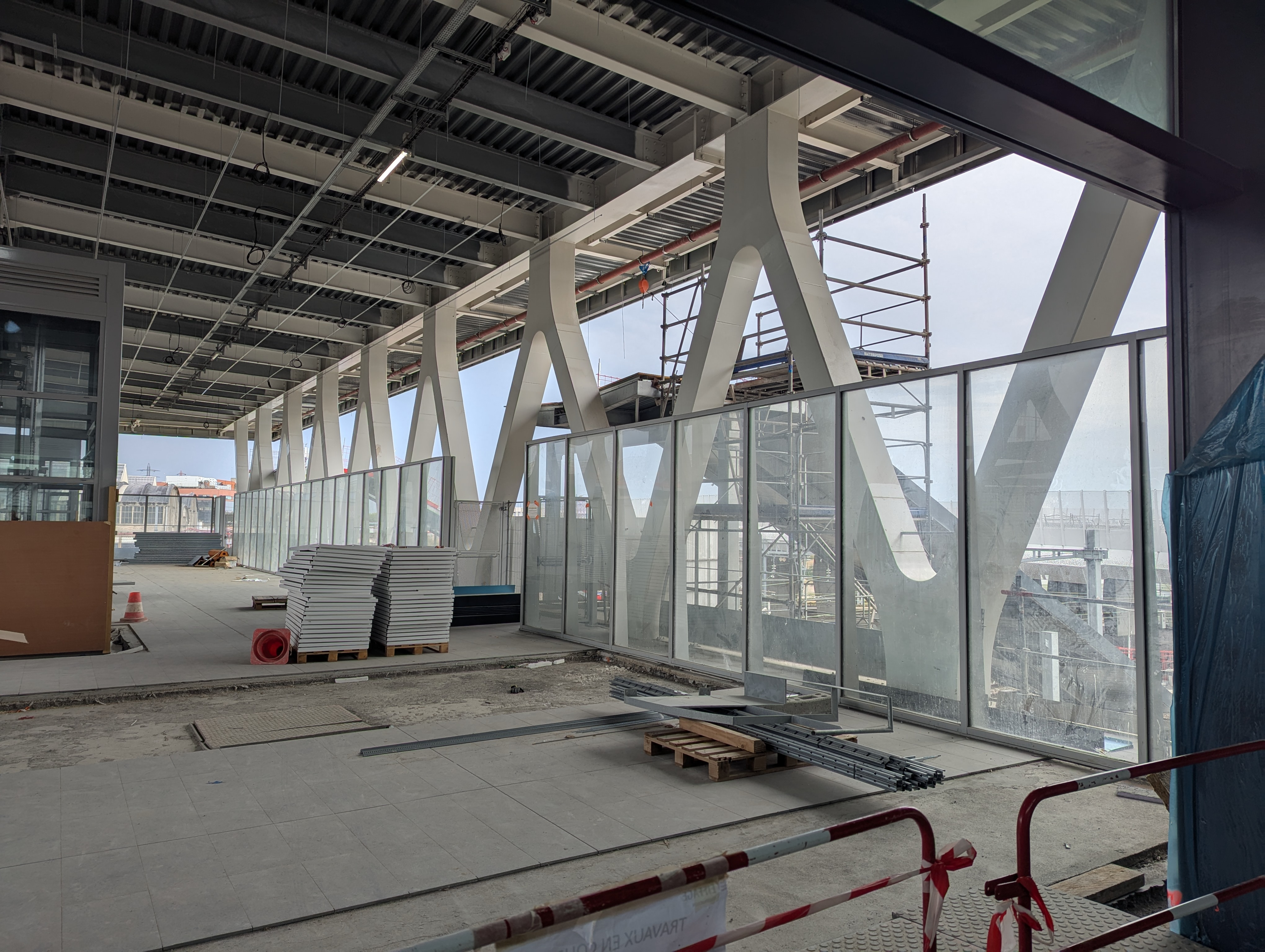
Connecting footbridge between Metro/RER in 2025

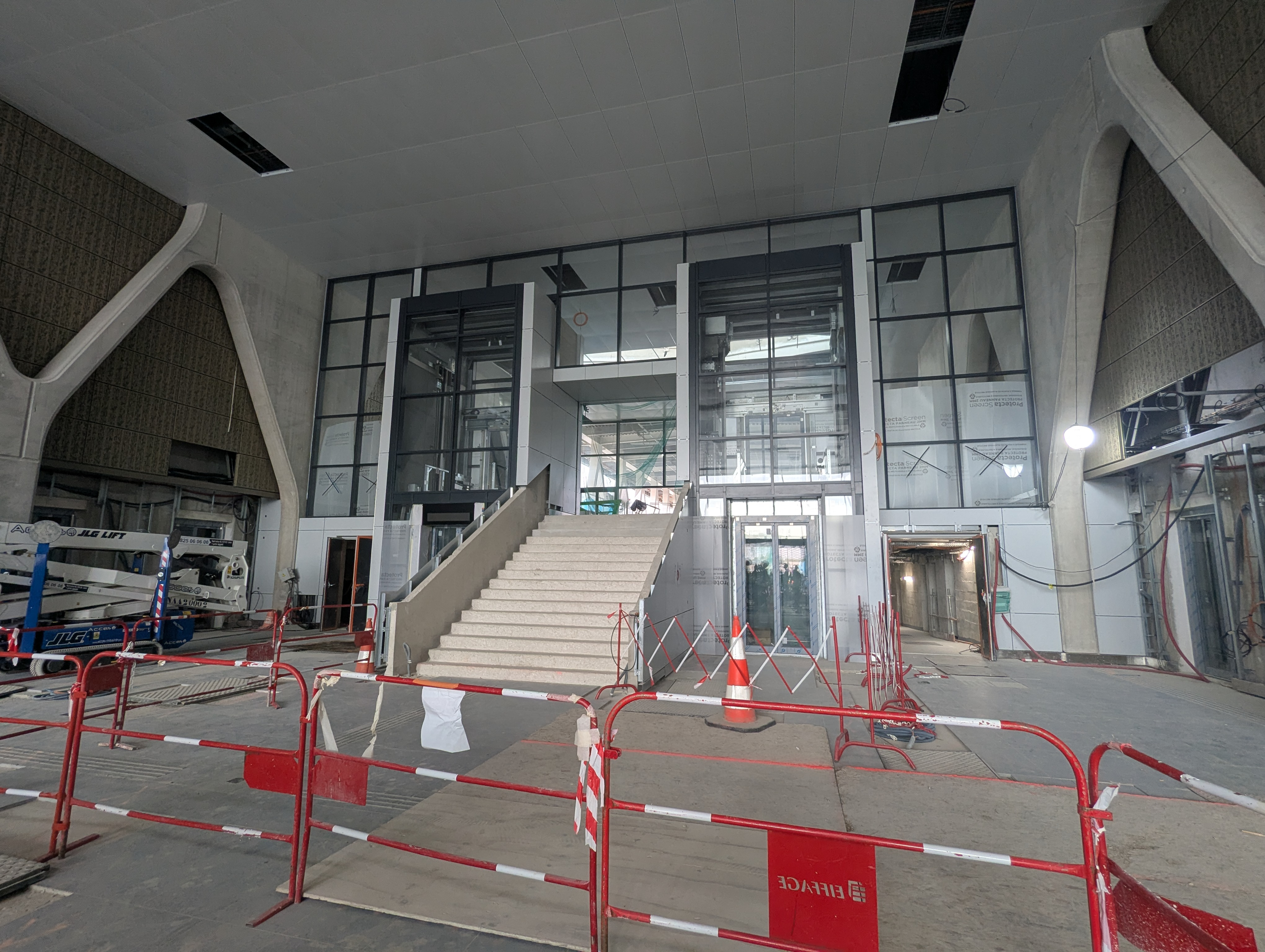
Inside Line 15 Entrance

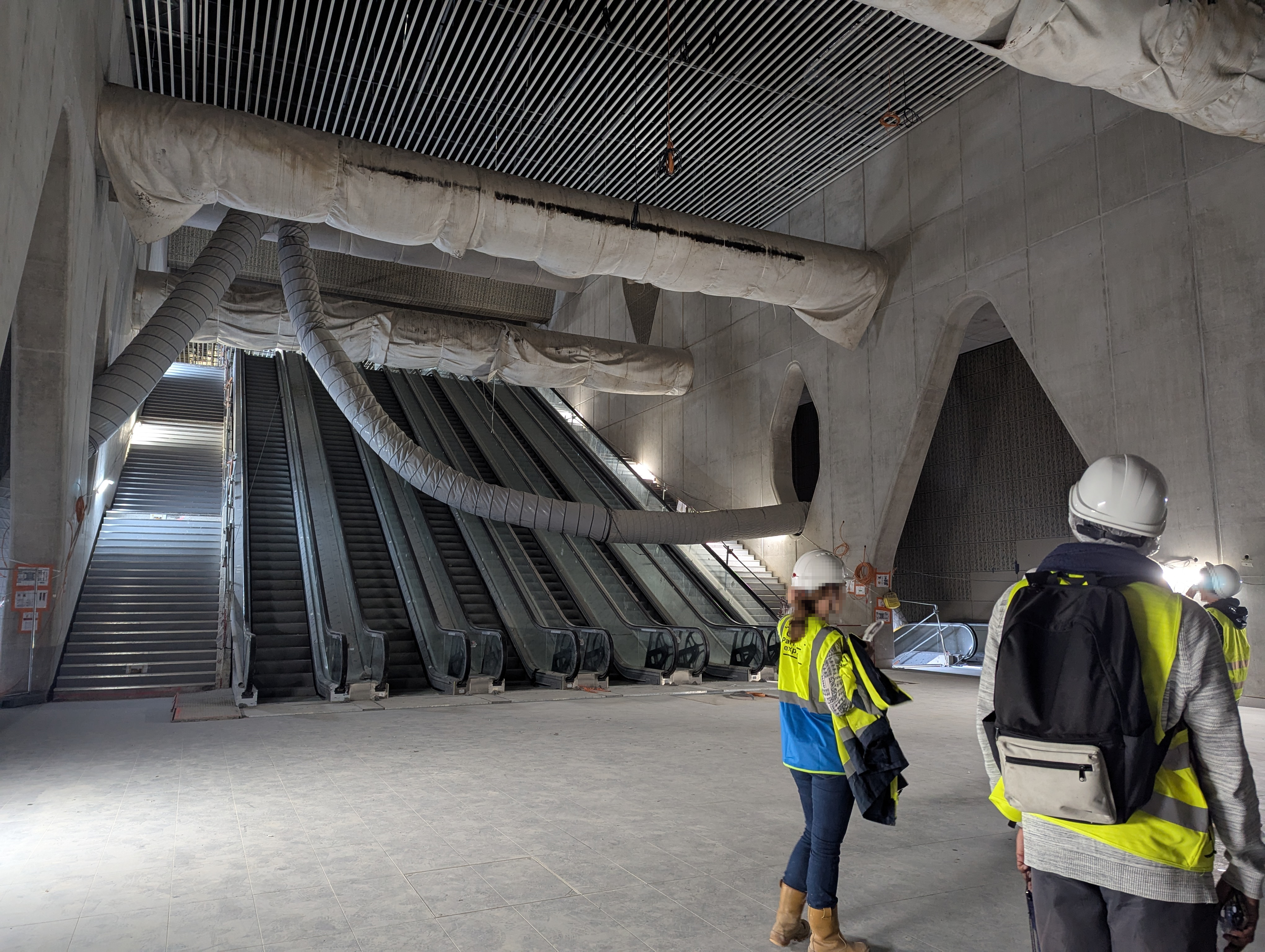
Main Line 15 escalators

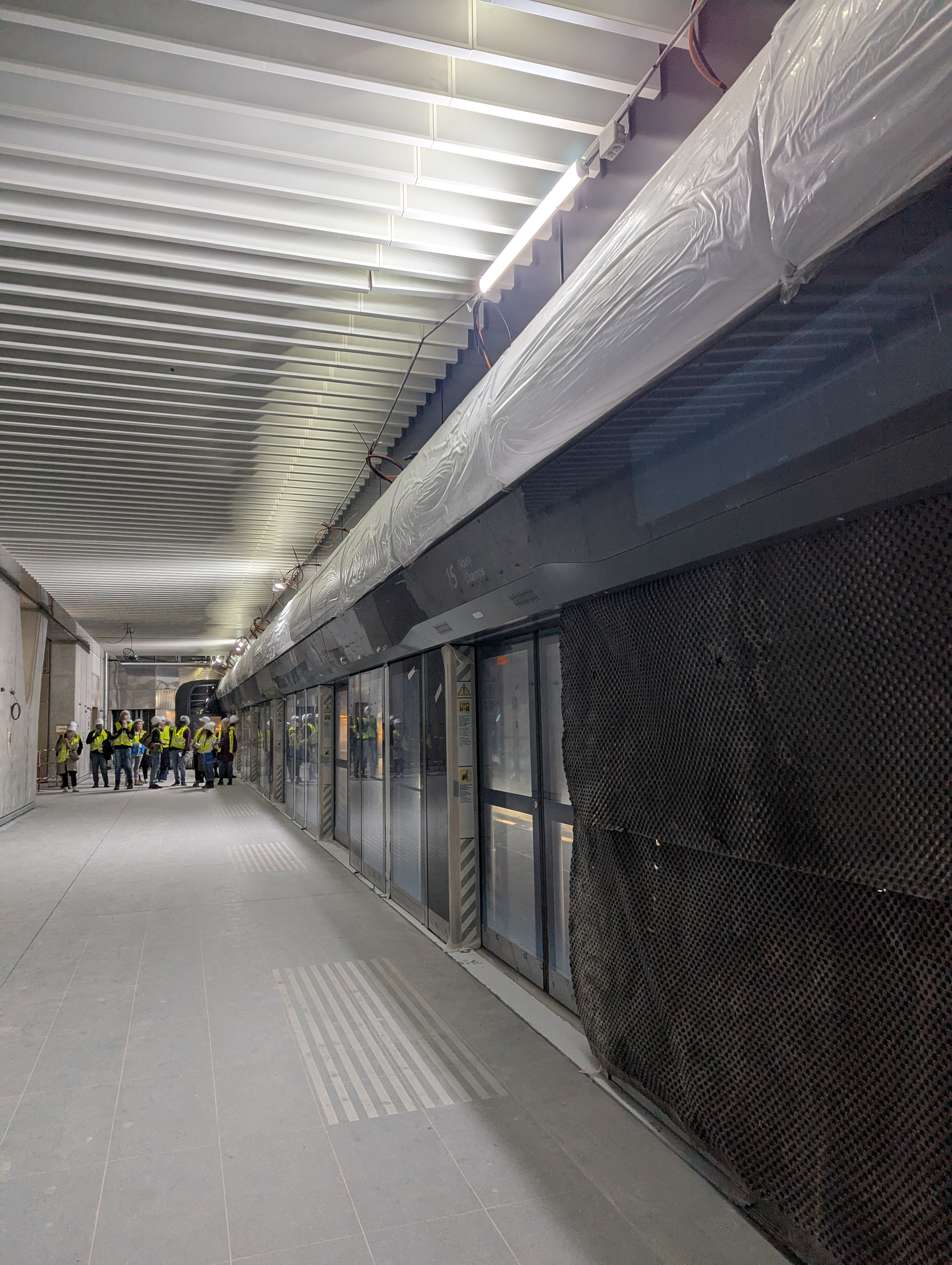
Line 15 platforms in 2025

== See also ==
- List of Réseau Express Régional stations
