= Villeneuve–Prairie station =

Railway station in Choisy-le-Roi, France

Villeneuve-Prairie
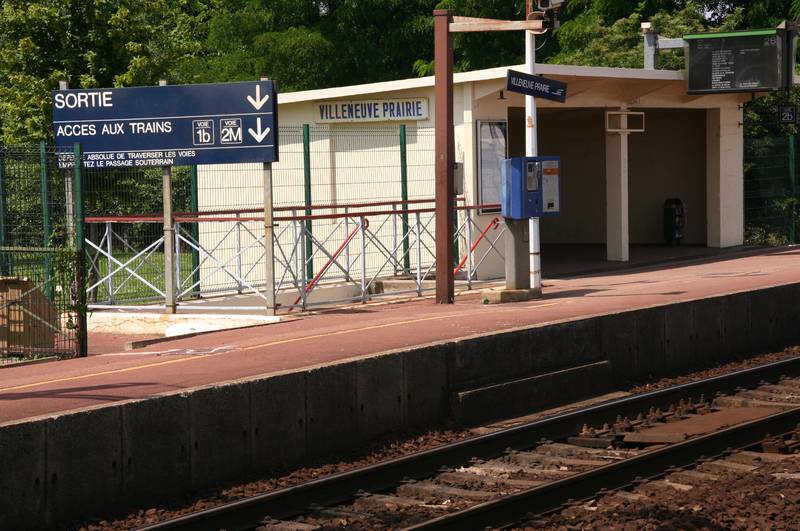
- Platform of Gare de Villeneuve-Prairie

General information
- Location: 94600 Choisy-le-Roi, Val-de-Marne, Île-de-France, France
- Coordinates: 48°27′20″N 2°15′36″E
- Operator: SNCF
- Lines: Paris–Marseille railway RER D
- Platforms: 4 (1 side and 3 central)
- Tracks: 8
- Train operators: SNCF
- Connections: Noctilien Lines N132, N134

Other information
- Station code: 8768185
- Fare zone: 3

History
- Closed: 15 December 2013
Location

Villeneuve-Prairie is a closed station in Choisy-le-Roi, Val-de-Marne, Île-de-France, France. The station was closed on 15 December 2013, and was replaced by Créteil-Pompadour station, around 800 meters to the northeast. It is on the Paris-Marseille railway. This station served the commune of Choisy-le-Roi and the neighbouring Créteil.

== Station info ==
The station is at the 10.7 kilometer point of the Paris–Marseille railway. According to the RER D Blog:

On December 15, many changes will take place on line D with a new service, new timetables and the opening of the new Créteil-Pompadour station (as we have already discussed in previous posts).

But this date also marks the final closure of the Villeneuve Prairie station. You will now have to go to Créteil Pompadour station, located about 800 meters away, to take the train.

For our travelers who took the train at this station, here is some additional information: From December 15, trains no longer serve Villeneuve Prairie and all accesses are closed. For technical reasons, sales to Villeneuve Prairie will be available on certain ticket machines until January 2014. If from December 15, you have tickets for Villeneuve Prairie, these tickets remain valid and you can use them to get to Créteil Pompadour station.

Ticket sales at the Villeneuve-Prairie vending machine will be stopped on December 12.

— Villeneuve Prairie Station: Definitive Closure,

== Train services ==
The following services served Villeneuve-Prairie station:

- Local services (RER D) Creil–Orry-la-Ville–Coye–Goussainville–Saint-Denis–Gare de Lyon–Villeneuve-Saint-Georges–Juvisy–Corbeil–Essonnes
- Local services (RER D) Goussainville–Saint-Denis–Gare de Lyon–Villeneuve-Saint-Georges–Montgeron-Crosne–Combs-la-Ville–Quincy–Melun
