= Combs-la-Ville–Quincy station =

Train station (Paris RER)

Combs-la-Ville–Quincy
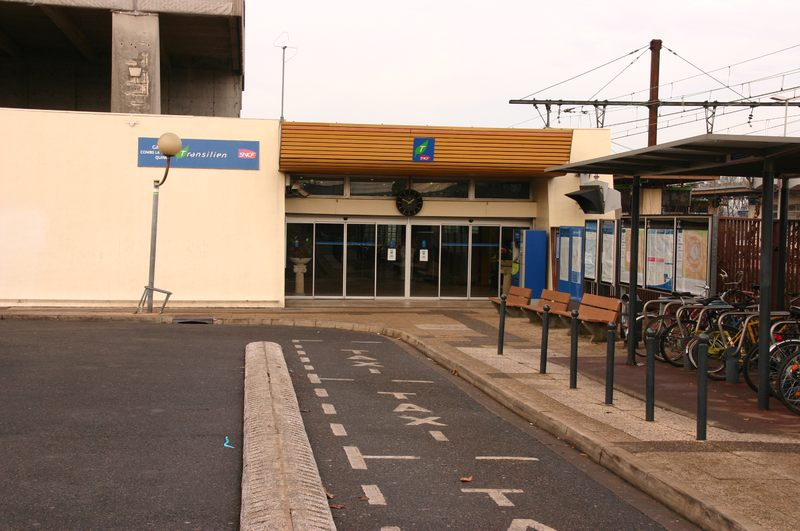
- Main entrance of Gare de Combs-la-Ville–Quincy

General information
- Location: Combs-la-Ville, Seine-et-Marne, Île-de-France, France
- Coordinates: 48°40′02″N 2°32′53″E
- Elevation: 81 m (266 ft)
- Operator: SNCF
- Lines: Paris–Marseille railway RER D
- Platforms: 5 (1 side and 2 central)
- Tracks: 4
- Train operators: SNCF
- Connections: Noctilien Line N132, N134

Construction
- Accessible: Yes, by prior reservation

Other information
- Station code: 87682146
- Fare zone: 5

History
- Opened: 12 August 1849; 177 years ago

Passengers
- 2024: 4,507,788

Services
| Preceding station | RER | Following station |
|---|---|---|
| Boussy-Saint-Antoine towards Goussainville | RER D | Lieusaint–Moissy towards Melun |
Location

Combs-la-Ville–Quincy is an RER station in Combs-la-Ville, Seine-et-Marne, Île-de-France, France. The station was opened on 12 August 1849 and is on the Paris–Marseille railway. The RER Line D, which is operated by the SNCF, serves the station.

== Station Info ==
Now standing at an altitude of 81 meters above sea level, Combs-la-Ville–Quincy station is at the 25.896-kilometer point of the Paris-Marseille railway, in between the stations of Boussy-Saint-Antoine and Lieusaint–Moissy. In 2014, 3,866,400 people used the station, and in 2016, the station served 4,228,200 passengers.

== Train Services ==
The following RER D train services serve the station:

- Local services (RER D) Goussainville–Saint-Denis–Gare de Lyon–Villeneuve-Saint-Georges–Combs-la-Ville–Quincy–Melun
- Local services (RER D) Gare de Lyon–Creteil-Pompadour–Villeneuve-Saint-Georges–Combs-la-Ville–Quincy–Melun
