= RER D =

Railway service in France

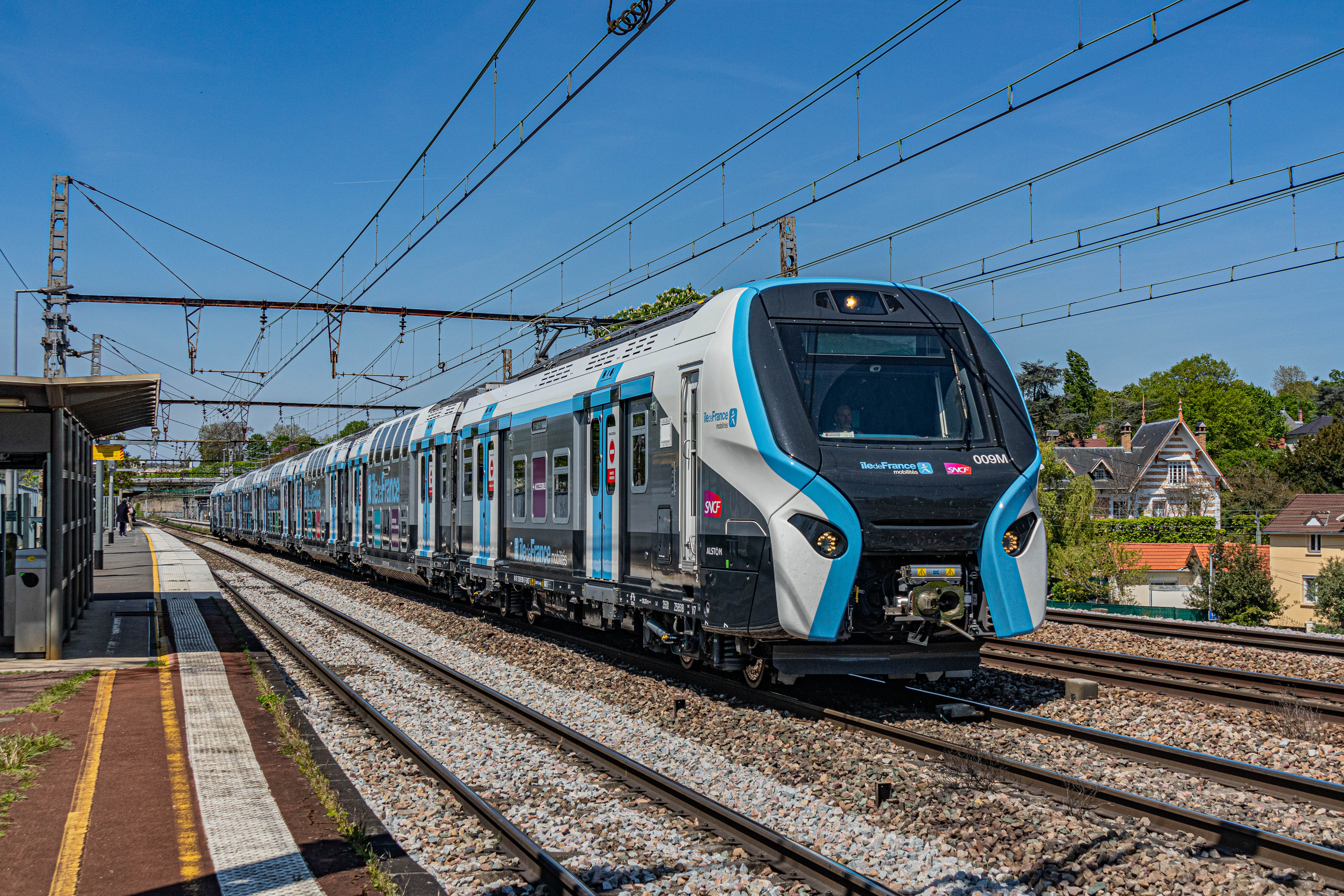
- RER NG undergoing testing on the RER D line

Overview
- Status: Active
- Termini: Creil (D3); Melun (D2), Malesherbes (D4)
- Connecting lines: Paris Metro Paris Metro Line 1 Paris Metro Line 2 Paris Metro Line 4 Paris Metro Line 5 Paris Metro Line 7 Paris Metro Line 11 Paris Metro Line 14 RER RER A RER B RER C RER E Transilien Transilien Line H (Paris-Nord) Transilien Line K (Paris-Nord) Transilien Line P (Paris-Est) Transilien Line R (Paris-Gare-de-Lyon) Tramways in Île-de-France Île-de-France tramway Line 1 Île-de-France tramway Line 5 Île-de-France tramway Line 8 Île-de-France tramway Line 11
- Stations: 59

Service
- Type: Rapid transit/commuter rail
- System: Réseau Express Régional
- Operator: SNCF
- Rolling stock: Z 20500, Z 57000, Z 58500
- Ridership: 145 million journeys per year

History
- Opened: 27 September 1987; 38 years ago
- Last extension: 1996

Technical
- Line length: 190 km (120 mi)
- Track gauge: 1,435 mm (4 ft 8 1/2 in) standard gauge
Route map
- (*) Under construction

RER D is one of the five lines in the Réseau Express Régional (English: Regional Express Network), a hybrid commuter rail and rapid transit system serving Paris and its suburbs. The 190-kilometre (120 mi) line crosses the region from north to south, with all trains serving a group of stations in central Paris, before branching out towards the ends of the line.

The line connects Creil in the north to Melun and Malesherbes in the south, passing through the heart of Paris. Line D also links Gare du Nord with Gare de Lyon via Châtelet-Les Halles.

Opened in stages from 1987 to 1996, it is the longest RER line by distance, and the busiest SNCF line in France, carrying up to 615,000 passengers and operating 466 trains each working day.

Almost all of the line is located in the Île-de-France region, that is, within the jurisdiction of the Île-de-France Mobilités, but some of the branch lines at the north and south of the line are outside the region.

== Chronology ==
- 27 September 1987: Inauguration of Line D. Operated Villiers-le-Bel – Gare du Nord – Châtelet-Les Halles, 19 km (12 mi), using the Line B Tunnel to Châtelet–Les Halles
- 1988: Extension north towards Goussainville.
- September 1990: Extension north towards Orry-la-Ville.
- September 1995: Inauguration of "Interconnexion Sud-Est". The line is extended from Châtelet to Melun and La Ferté-Alais then Malesherbes (the following year, 1996) in the south of Paris.
- 25 January 1998: New station, Stade de France–Saint-Denis, opened. Located between Gare du Nord and St-Denis.
- 29 January 2007: First renovated Z 20500 stock in service.
- 19 March 2008: Start of the "D Maintenant" programme by Guillaume Pepy, the president of SNCF.
- 14 December 2008: Reduced "Interconnexion Nord-Sud" service, with 8 interconnected trains per hour.
- Late 2009: End of the "D Maintenant" programme.
- 7 December 2011: Start of studies for the doubling of the Châtelet-Gare du Nord tunnel.
- 15 December 2013: New station, Créteil-Pompadour, opened and replaced Villeneuve – Prairie.
- 13 December 2024: First Z 58500 (RER NG) enter service on the RER D

== History ==
=== Conception ===
Initially, the "métro régional", the ancestor to the RER, was conceived of three lines, one going from east to west (the future RER A), a new line built from existing lines (the future RER C), the extension of the Ligne de Sceaux and with its interconnection with an SNCF line, along with a supplementary interconnected north–south (the future RER D). The operation of renovating "les Halles" gave the occasion to build Châtelet-Les Halles with a cut-and-cover method, in order to reduce costs.

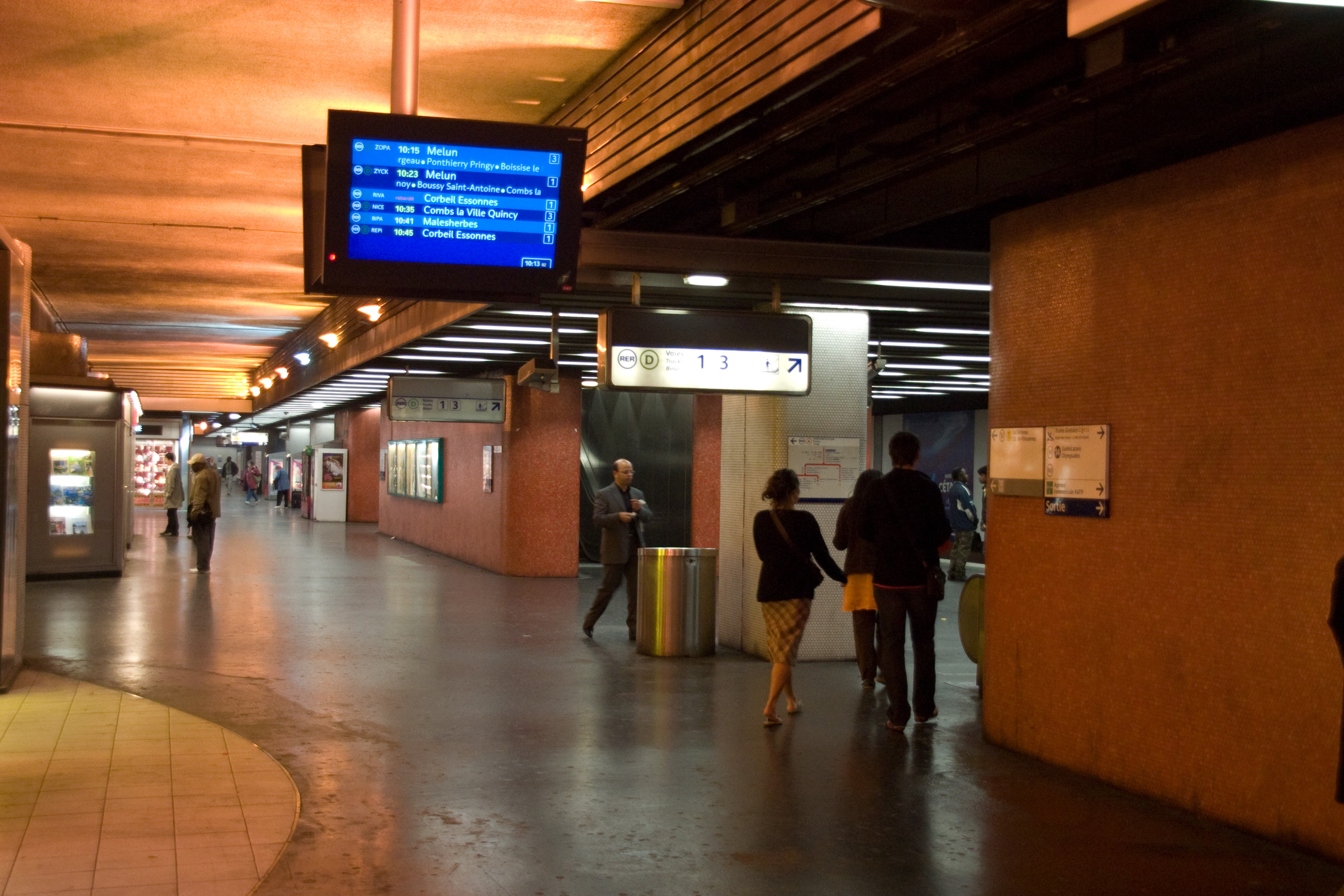
Gare de Lyon underground station in June 2008.

Initially the new RER D was meant to share tracks with the RER A between Paris-Gare de Lyon and Châtelet-Les Halles. But RATP, the company who runs the RER A, objected to such an operation as the number of passengers using the RER A was growing and required running extra trains on the RER A. It was decided instead that each line should have its own platforms, with RER A at the Gare de Lyon having its tracks at a lower level of the underground station and the future RER D on the upper level. The RER D at the Gare de Lyon has four tracks and, being above the RER A tracks, this allows "platform to platform" transfers vertically, a Japanese invention.

=== Inauguration ===
On 27 September 1987, the RER D was officially created, by extending existing suburban trains from Villiers-le-Bel to Gare du Nord, towards Châtelet-Les Halles. Initially 19 km (12 mi) long, it was equipped with bi-current Z 8800 stock trains, while newer Z 20500 stock trains were still being built. At Châtelet-Les Halles, the RER D terminated on the three central tracks, already built from the conception of Châtelet-Les Halles station.

In 1988, existing suburban trains terminating at Goussainville now integrate with the RER D. On the same year, the first bi-mode Z 20500 trains are in service. They were initially composed of 4 cars until the north–south interconnection was inaugurated in 1995, when they became 5-car trains (where they're coupled to make 10-car trains).

In September 1990, the RER D again extended north to Orry-la-Ville. At the same time, one-man operation started on the RER D.

=== Central tunnel opening ===
On 11 September 1995, the north–south interconnection of the RER D was put into service by building a dedicated 2.5 km (1.6 mi) long tunnel between Châtelet-Les Halles and the Gare de Lyon.

In 1996, the RER D was extended south from La Ferté-Alais to Malesherbes. On 15 January 1998 for the 1998 FIFA World Cup, Stade de France – Saint-Denis station opened, in order to serve the Stade de France.

=== Enhancements ===
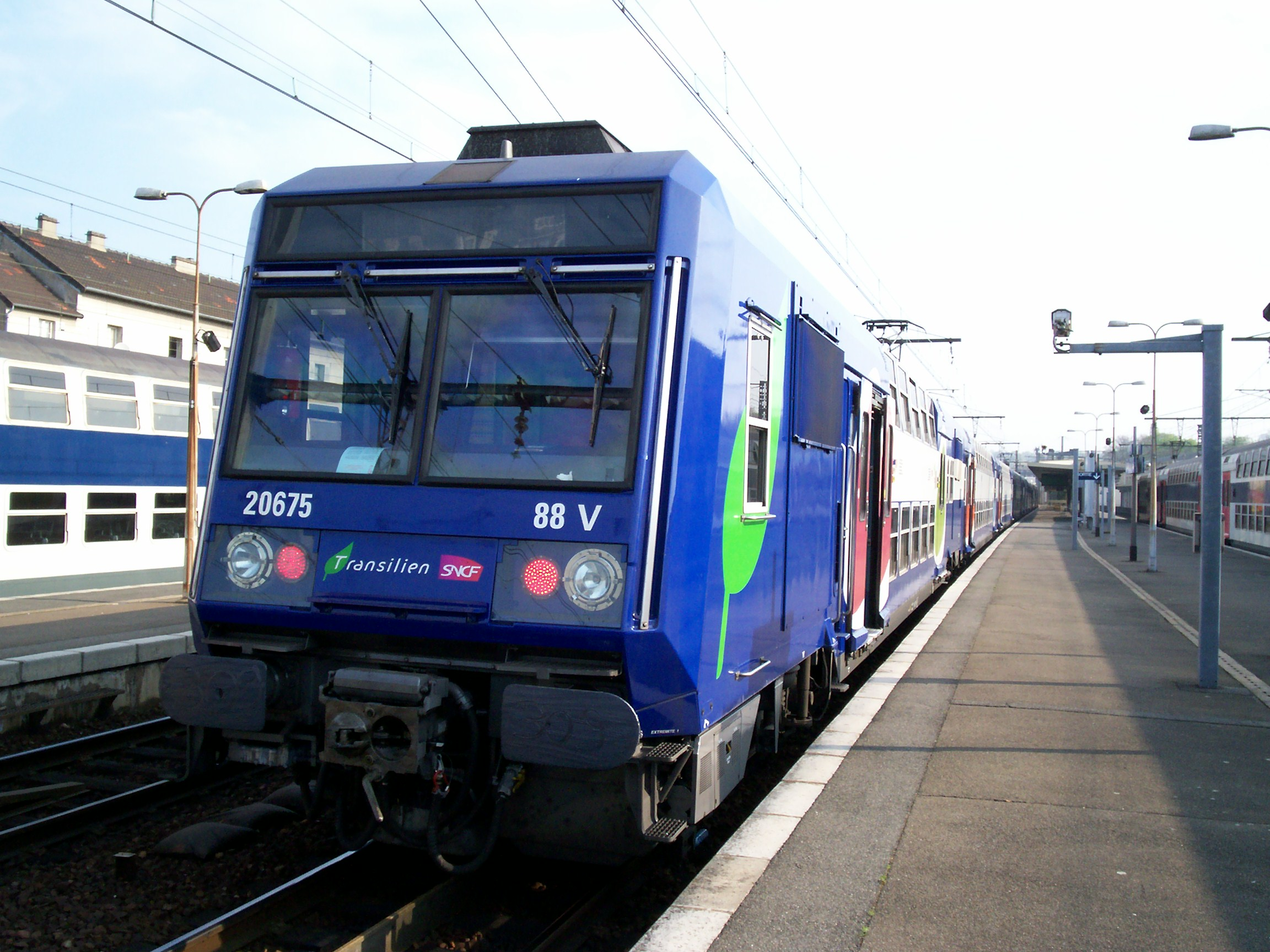
A Z 20500 train at Corbeil-Essonnes station, in April 2007.

On 22 November 2006 the STIF approved a master plan for the RER D in order to establish short, mid and long-term goals for its reliability.

On 29 January 2007, the first renovated Z 20500 train was presented, the first of 137 trains. Renovated trains feature a new blue livery, uniform 2+3 seats, new lighting and new floor covering. The renovation programme cost over €100 million.

=== Delays ===
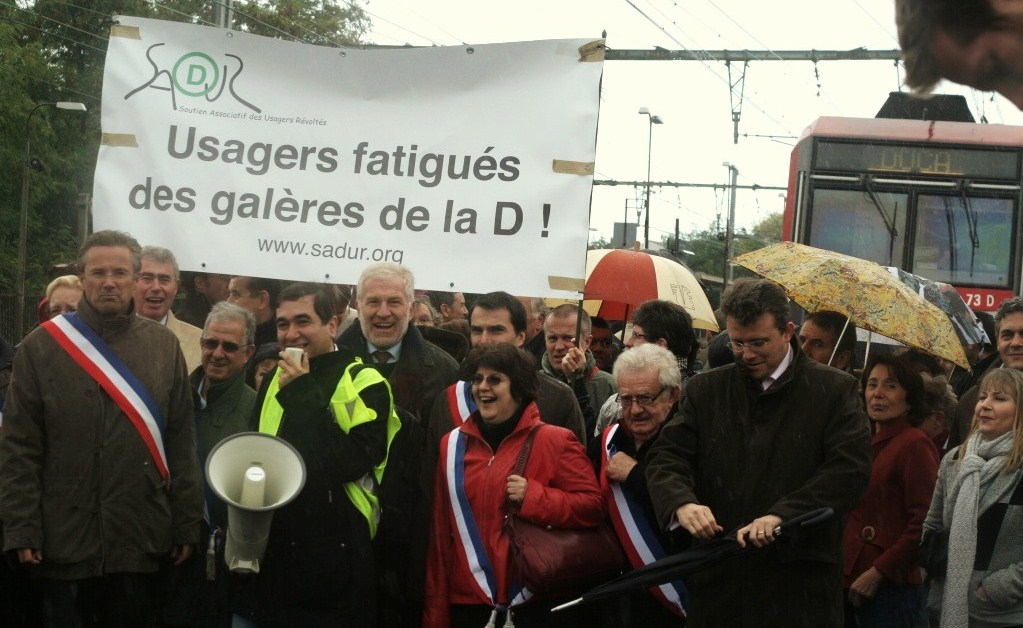
Protesters at Yerres on 17 October 2009

The RER D has among the worst on-time performance of lines in Île-de-France, with 84% of trains running on time on average 2013-2021, and 85% of trains running on time in late 2023. This unpunctuality is partially due to the tunnel the RER B and RER D lines share between Châtelet–Les Halles and Gare du Nord, where even a small delay on either line can cause large delays and cancelled trains.

== Service nomenclature ==
Like all other lines of the RER system, every train is assigned a four letter code, called a name of service or a mission code. Train timetables, passenger information display systems and the front of the trains all display names of services.

=== New system ===
The first letter corresponds to the final destination, which is essentially the train's terminus.

- A: Gare du Nord
- B: Malesherbes
- D: Gare de Lyon (Underground)
- E: Saint-Denis
- F: Goussainville
- J: Juvisy
- K: Évry-Courcouronnes
- L: Orry-la-Ville-Coye
- M: Châtelet–Les Halles
- N: Combs-la-Ville–Quincy
- P: Créteil-Pompadour or Gare de Lyon (Surface)
- R: Corbeil-Essonnes
- S: Creil
- T: La Ferté-Alais
- U: Stade de France–Saint-Denis
- V: Villiers-le-Bel–Gonesse–Arnouville
- X: Villeneuve-Saint-Georges
- Z: Melun

The second letter indicates the stations served by the train in the section spanning from Gare de Lyon to Villeneuve-Saint-Georges.

- A: Stops only at Maisons-Alfort–Alfortville and Créteil-Pompadour
- I: Express between Gare de Lyon and Villeneuve-Saint-Georges
- O: All stops on this section
- U: Stops only at Maisons-Alfort–Alfortville.

The third letter indicates the branch the train takes.

- C: Branch from Gare de Lyon to Combs-la-Ville–Quincy
- P: Branch from Gare de Lyon to Corbeil-Essonnes via Évry-Courcouronnes (plateau)
- S: Branch from Corbeil-Essonnes to Melun (littoral)
- V: Branch from Juvisy to Corbeil-Essonnes, or even Malesherbes or Melun, via Ris-Orangis (valley)

The fourth letter indicates whether the train would serve Viry-Châtillon or not, and it also indicates the direction the train is running.

- A: This train runs from the south part to the north part and stops at Viry-Châtillon.
- E: This train does not stop at Viry-Châtillon (irrespective of direction).
- O: This train runs from the north part to the south part and stops at Viry-Châtillon.

Table of names of services as of 2022
Destination	Names of services
Malesherbes	BOVO
Gare de Lyon (underground)	DACA, DICA, DOCA, DOPA, DOPE, DUPA
Goussainville	FACA
Juvisy	JAVA, JOVA, JUVA
Orry-la-Ville - Coye	LOPA, LOPE
Gare de Lyon (surface)	PACA, PICA
Corbeil-Essonnes	ROPE, ROPO, ROSA, ROVO, RUPO
Creil	SOPA, SOPE
Stade de France – Saint-Denis	UACA, UOPA, UOPE, UUPA
Villiers-le-Bel–Gonesse–Arnouville	VOPA, VOPE, VUPA
Melun	ZACO, ZICO, ZOSO, ZOVO

=== Old system ===
In the old system used until 2008, the last letter did not indicate whether the train would serve Viry-Châtillon or not, and the first letters for Creil, Orry-la-Ville-Coye and Villeneuve-Saint-Georges were different.

First letter: destination of the train

- A: Gare du Nord
- B: Malesherbes
- C: Creil
- D: Gare de Lyon
- F: Goussainville
- H: Orry-la-Ville-Coye
- J: Juvisy
- M: Châtelet–Les Halles
- N: Combs-la-Ville–Quincy
- Q: Villeneuve-Saint-Georges
- R: Corbeil-Essonnes
- T: La Ferté-Alais
- U: Stade de France–Saint-Denis
- V: Villiers-le-Bel–Gonesse–Arnouville
- Z: Melun

Third letter: the branch

- C: Branch from Gare de Lyon to Combs-la-Ville–Quincy
- P: Branch from Gare de Lyon to Corbeil-Essonnes via Évry-Courcouronnes (plateau)
- L: Branch from Gare de Lyon to Orry-la-Ville
- S: Branch from Corbeil-Essonnes to Melun
- V: Branch from Juvisy to Corbeil-Essonnes, or even Malesherbes or Melun, via Ris-Orangis (valley)

Table of names of services prior to 2008
Destination	Names of services
Gare du Nord	AUCH, AUPA, AUVA
Malesherbes	BIPA, BIPE, BOPA
Creil	CIVA, COVA, COVO
Gare de Lyon	DAPA, DECA, DICA, DIPA, DOCA, DOLE, DOPA, DOVA, DUCA
Goussainville	FACE, FIPE, FOVI
Orry-la-Ville - Coye	HIPA, HIVA, HOPA, HOVI
Juvisy	JAPA
Châtelet–Les Halles	MOLE
Combs-la-Ville–Quincy	NACE, NICE, NOCE
Corbeil-Essonnes	REPI, RIPA, RIPE, RIPO, RIPA, ROPA, ROSA, ROSU, ROVA
La Ferté-Alais	TYPA, TYPE, TYPO
Stade de France – Saint-Denis	UIPE, ULCO, ULPE, UPPE
Villiers-le-Bel–Gonesse–Arnouville	VICK, VIPA, VIPE, VOPE
Melun	ZACK, ZAPE, ZIPE, ZOCK, ZOPA, ZOVA, ZUCK, ZYCK

== Incidents ==
On 20 September 2003, an unusual incident occurred near Villeneuve-Triage station. A southbound train stopped at 18:50 on the central track near the station due to an incident. Passengers aboard were invited to step off the train by the left, as track 2M has been neutralised by the regulators. However, due to a misuse of the alarm signal by nervous passengers, some doors opened on the right. Ignoring the driver's orders, numerous passengers stepped off on the right, and were confronted with a northbound train, travelling at around 110 km/h (70 mph).

The driver of the train had the time to activate his emergency brakes and slowed the train to around 70 km/h (45 mph), which permitted to passengers to brace against the stopped train or jump into the ditch. Thankfully, no one was injured. This near miss, filmed by a passenger with a mobile phone, was broadcast the night of the incident, and created a large controversy.

On 9 July 2004, an alleged anti-semitic assault provoked a public and political reaction, with immediate declarations from the Ministry of the Interior Dominique de Villepin and the President of France Jacques Chirac. However, the allegations were proven false after the investigation, as the person behind the assault suffered from pathological lying. The event provoked a controversy on the treatment of information by the media.

== See also ==
- List of stations of the Paris Métro
- List of stations of the Paris RER
