= Corbeil-Essonnes station =

French railway station

Corbeil-Essonnes

General information
- Location: Corbeil-Essonnes, Essonne, Île-de-France, France
- Coordinates: 48°36′51″N 2°28′25″E
- Line: Grigny to Corbeil-Essonnes line RER D

Other information
- Station code: 87681007

Passengers
- 2024: 11,896,397

Services
Preceding station	RER	Following station
Le Bras de Fer towards Creil	RER D	Terminus
Évry-Val-de-Seine towards Gare de Lyon	RER D	Moulin-Galant towards Malesherbes
Évry-Val-de-Seine towards Juvisy	RER D	Essonnes-Robinson towards Melun
Location

Corbeil-Essonnes is a railway station in Corbeil-Essonnes, in the department of Essonne, France. It is served by RER Line D commuter trains. With 12 million passengers per year (2024), it is one of the busiest stations of Essonne.

== See also ==
- List of stations of the Paris RER
