= Paris–Marseille railway =

Railway line in France

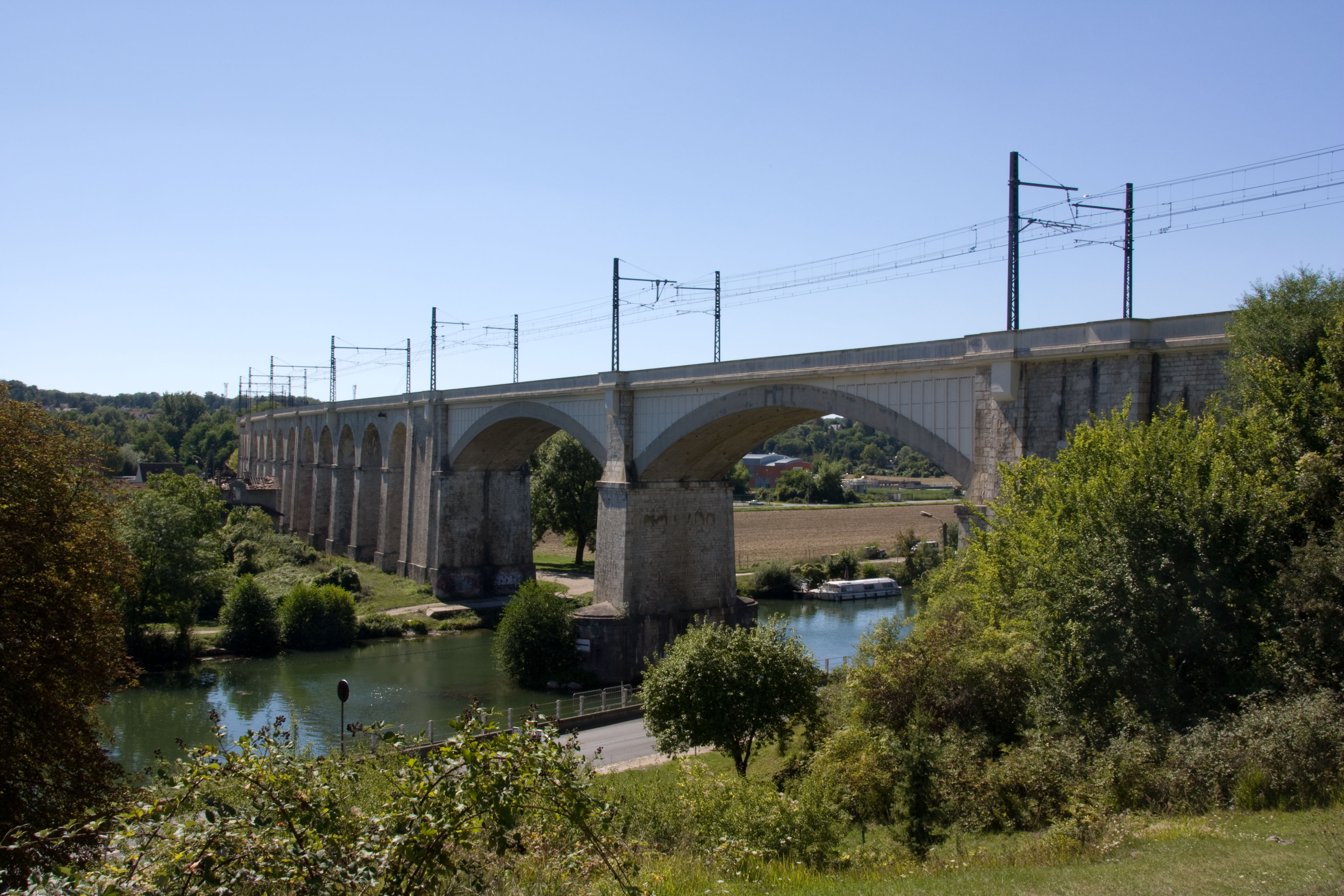
- The railway viaduct crossing the Loing at Saint-Mammès

Overview
- Status: Operational
- Owner: SNCF
- Locale: France (Île-de-France, Bourgogne-Franche-Comté, Auvergne-Rhône-Alpes, Provence-Alpes-Côte d'Azur)
- Termini: Gare de Lyon, Paris; Marseille-Saint-Charles station

Service
- System: SNCF
- Operator: SNCF

History
- Opened: 1847–1856

Technical
- Line length: 862 km (536 mi)
- Number of tracks: Double track
- Track gauge: 1,435 mm (4 ft 8 1/2 in) standard gauge
- Electrification: 1.5 kV DC

The railway from Paris to Marseille is an 862-kilometre long railway line, that connects Paris to the southern port city of Marseille, France, via Dijon and Lyon. The railway was opened in several stages between 1847 and 1856, when the final section through Lyon was opened. The opening of the LGV Sud-Est high speed line from Paris to Lyon in 1981, the LGV Rhône-Alpes in 1992 and the LGV Méditerranée in 2001 has decreased its importance for passenger traffic.

== Route ==
The Paris–Marseille railway leaves the Gare de Lyon in Paris in southeastern direction. It crosses the river Marne at Charenton-le-Pont, and follows the right Seine bank upstream until Crosne, where it follows a course east of the Forest of Sénart. It crosses the Seine near Melun and follows the left Seine bank upstream, along the Forest of Fontainebleau. Beyond Montereau-Fault-Yonne, the railway follows the left Yonne bank upstream. At Migennes the Yonne is crossed, and the small rivers Armançon, Brenne and Oze are followed upstream. Beyond Blaisy-Bas the railway enters the watershed of the Mediterranean Sea, descending the Ouche river valley to central Dijon.

At Dijon the railway turns south, running along the east side of the Côte d'Or escarpment with its famous vineyards. At Chalon-sur-Saône the railway reaches the river Saône, and follows its right bank downstream until the city centre of Lyon. Before and after the Lyon-Perrache station it crosses the Saône and the Rhône respectively, and continues downstream along the left Rhône bank. Between Collonges-au-Mont-d'Or (north of Lyon) and La Guillotière (a southern quarter of Lyon) there is a parallel line to its east, on which the other main station of Lyon, Part-Dieu, is situated. There is also a long parallel line on the right bank of the Rhône between Lyon and Nîmes, which is mainly used for freight transport.

The railway passes through Valence, Avignon and Arles, where it leaves the Rhône and turns east. It passes along the northern shore of the Étang de Berre. After a total length of 862 km, it reaches its terminus Marseille-Saint-Charles station.

=== Main stations ===
The main stations on the Paris–Marseille railway are:

- Gare de Lyon (Paris)
- Dijon-Ville station
- Lyon-Perrache station
- Avignon-Centre station
- Marseille-Saint-Charles station

== History ==
The sections Paris–Lyon, Lyon–Avignon and Avignon–Marseille were built and exploited by three different companies, that became part of Chemins de fer de Paris à Lyon et à la Méditerranée in 1857. The concessions Lyon–Avignon and Avignon–Marseille had already been united in 1852 of the Chemin de fer de Lyon à la Méditerranée. The first section that was opened in 1847 led from Rognonas near Avignon to Pas-des-Lanciers near Marseille. Marseille was connected in 1848. In 1849 a line from Paris to Tonnerre (Yonne) and a line from Dijon to Chalon-sur-Saône were built, and Avignon was connected with Rognonas. Tonnerre and Dijon were connected in 1851. In 1854 the line from Marseille to Avignon was extended to Valence, and the line from Paris to Chalon was extended to Lyon-Vaise. In 1855 Valence was connected with La Guillotière, a southern quarter of Lyon. Finally in 1856 the passage through Lyon from La Guillotière to Vaise was opened. Together with existing railways north of Paris, this enabled for the first time railway travel between the North Sea or the English Channel and the Mediterranean Sea.

It is also known as the "Imperial Line" as it was used by Napoleon III, who saw it as a way to connect all regions over which he reigned. France at the time had a 50-year delay on industrialisation when compared to England; the railway would help speed along this progress. Coal was carried to all regions of the country, Beaujolais nouveau could be sampled far beyond its native area, with wines from the Midi, the Côtes-du-Rhône and even the Bourgognes using the line. The PLM became a sort of "wine highway", with up to 10% of the company's freight profits in 1909 coming from the wine trade.

== Services ==
The Paris–Marseille railway is used by the following passenger services:

- TGV on most of its length, except the section between Combs-la-Ville and Montbard
- Intercités from Paris to Nevers and from Paris to Clermont-Ferrand (on the section between Paris and Moret–Veneux-les-Sablons) and from Bordeaux to Marseille (on the section between Tarascon and Marseille)
- TER Bourgogne-Franche-Comté, TER Auvergne-Rhône-Alpes and TER Provence-Alpes-Côte d'Azur regional services on the whole line
- Transilien regional services on the section between Paris and Montereau
- RER D Paris rapid transit on the section between Paris and Melun
