= Savigny-sur-Orge station =

Railway station in Savigny-sur-Orge, France

Savigny-sur-Orge
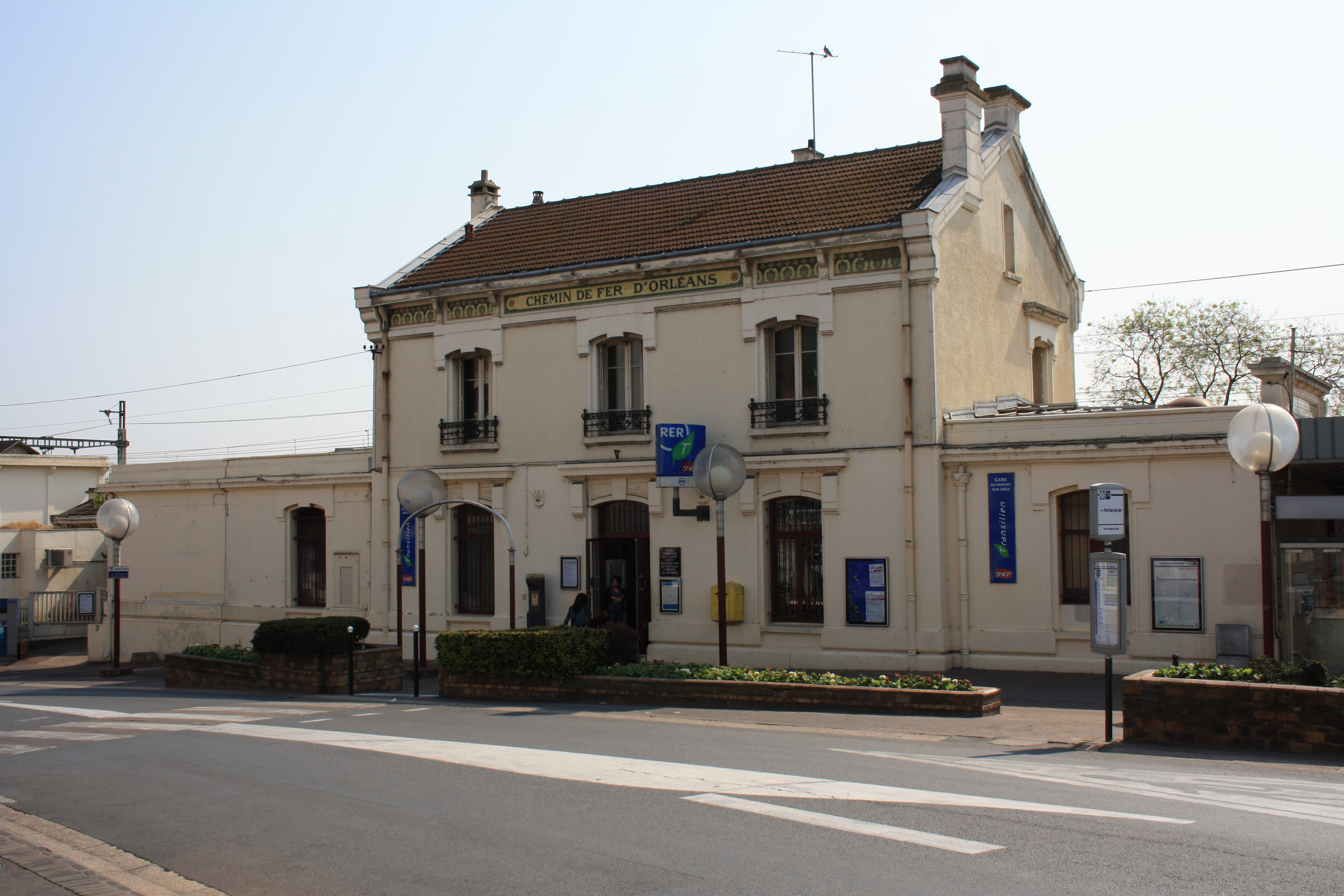
- Savigny-sur-Orge railway station

General information
- Location: Savigny-sur-Orge, Essonne, Île-de-France, France
- Coordinates: 48°40′34″N 2°21′08″E
- Lines: Paris–Bordeaux railway Grande Ceinture line
- Platforms: 2
- Tracks: 4

Other information
- Station code: 87545236
- Fare zone: 4

History
- Opened: 5 May 1843

Passengers
- 2024: 7,966,314

Services
Preceding station	RER	Following station
Juvisy towards Saint-Quentin-en-Yvelines	RER C	Épinay-sur-Orge towards Saint-Martin-d'Étampes
Juvisy towards Versailles Château Rive Gauche	RER C	Épinay-sur-Orge towards Dourdan-la-Forêt
Juvisy towards Montigny–Beauchamp	RER C	Épinay-sur-Orge towards Brétigny
Juvisy towards Versailles Château Rive Gauche	RER C	Petit Vaux towards Versailles Chantiers
Location

Savigny-sur-Orge (French pronunciation: [saviɲi syʁ ɔʁʒ]) is a railway station in Savigny-sur-Orge, Essonne, Greater Paris, France. The station is on the Paris–Bordeaux railway and Grande Ceinture line, a freight railway around Paris. The station is served by Paris' express suburban rail system, the RER. The train services are operated by SNCF.

== History ==
The station was opened in 1843. In May 1909 a venue for aviation races and exhibitions, Port-Aviation, opened to the public in Viry-Châtillon as the world's first purpose-built aerodrome. Savigny-sur-Orge station, about 900 metres (980 yards) from Port-Aviation, served the airfield's distinguished visitors, while most of the general public attending events at Port-Aviation arrived from Paris by rail at Juvisy station in Juvisy-sur-Orge. The press and post card publishers habitually referred to Port-Aviation by the misnomers "Savigny Airfield" and "Juvisy Airfield," although the "Juvisy" misnomer became the dominant one for the airfield and has persisted ever since. The railway operator serving the stations, the Compagnie d'Orléans (Orleans Company), was surprised by the large crowds that attended events at Port-Aviation, leading to packed trains and passengers waiting for hours for a train and sometimes rioting in the stations and on the trains themselves during Port-Aviation's 1909 exhibition season. The Compagnie d'Orléans took measures to correct these problems in time for Port-Aviation's 1910 season, and Svigny-sur-Orge station continued to serve Port-Aviation until the venue hosted its last public events in 1914.

== Train services ==
The following services serve the station:

- Local services (RER C) Saint-Martin d'Étampes–Juvisy–Paris–Issy–Versailles-Chantiers–Saint-Quentin-en-Yvelines
- Local services (RER C) Dourdan–Juvisy–Paris–Issy–Versailles-Chantiers–Saint-Quentin-en-Yvelines
- Local services (RER C) Dourdan–Juvisy–Paris–Ermont Eaubonne–Montigny
- Local services (RER C) Brétigny–Juvisy–Paris–Ermont Eaubonne–Montigny

== See also ==
- List of stations of the Paris RER
