= Épinay-sur-Orge station =

Railway station in Épinay-sur-Orge, France

Épinay-sur-Orge
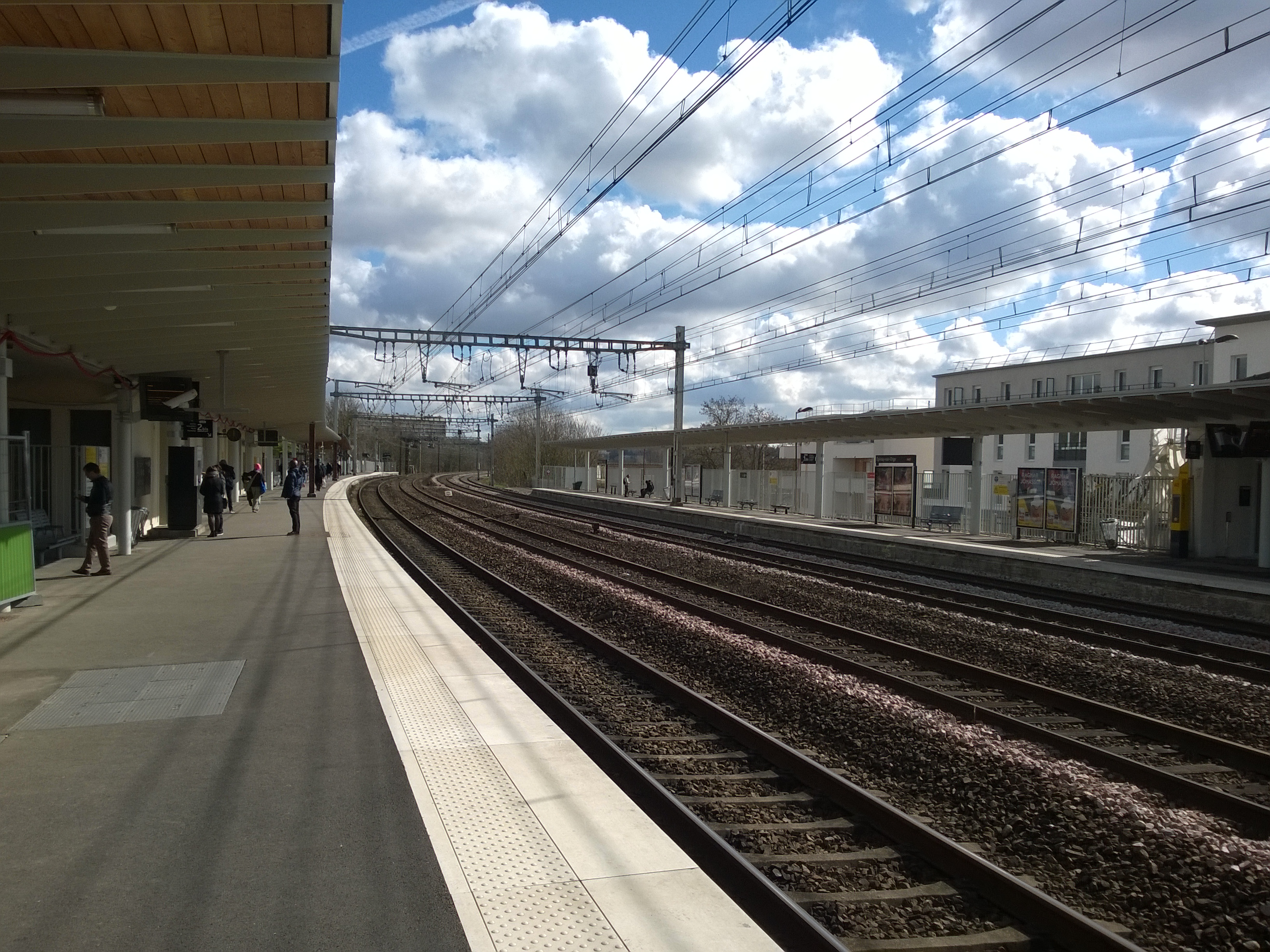
- Platform in 2018

General information
- Location: Épinay-sur-Orge, Essonne, Île-de-France, France
- Coordinates: 48°40′09″N 2°19′57″E
- System: RER station
- Owner: SNCF Réseau
- Operator: SNCF
- Line: RER C
- Platforms: 2
- Tracks: 4

Construction
- Accessible: Yes, by prior reservation

Other information
- Station code: 87545228
- Fare zone: 4

History
- Opened: 5 May 1843

Passengers
- 2024: 4,036,796

Services
Preceding station	RER	Following station
Savigny-sur-Orge towards Saint-Quentin-en-Yvelines	RER C	Sainte-Geneviève-des-Bois towards Saint-Martin-d'Étampes
Savigny-sur-Orge towards Versailles Château Rive Gauche	RER C	Sainte-Geneviève-des-Bois towards Dourdan-la-Forêt
Savigny-sur-Orge towards Montigny–Beauchamp	RER C	Sainte-Geneviève-des-Bois towards Brétigny
Preceding station	Tram	Following station
Petit Vaux towards Massy–Palaiseau	T12	Parc du Château towards Évry-Courcouronnes
Location

Épinay-sur-Orge (French pronunciation: [epinɛ syʁ ɔʁʒ]) is a railway station on RER C in Épinay-sur-Orge, Essonne, Greater Paris, France. The station was opened in 1843 and is on the Paris–Bordeaux railway. The station is served by Paris's express suburban rail system, the Réseau Express Régional (RER). The train services are operated by the SNCF.

== Train services ==
The following services serve the station:

- Local services (RER C) Saint-Martin d'Étampes–Juvisy–Paris–Issy–Versailles-Chantiers–Saint-Quentin-en-Yvelines
- Local services (RER C) Dourdan–Juvisy–Paris–Issy–Versailles-Chantiers–Saint-Quentin-en-Yvelines
- Local services (RER C) Dourdan–Juvisy–Paris–Ermont Eaubonne–Montigny
- Local services (RER C) Brétigny–Juvisy–Paris–Ermont Eaubonne–Montigny

An interchange with tramway T12 is available.

== See also ==
- List of stations of the Paris RER
- Transilien
