= Sainte-Geneviève-des-Bois station =

Railway station in Sainte-Geneviève-des-Bois, France

Sainte-Geneviève-des-Bois
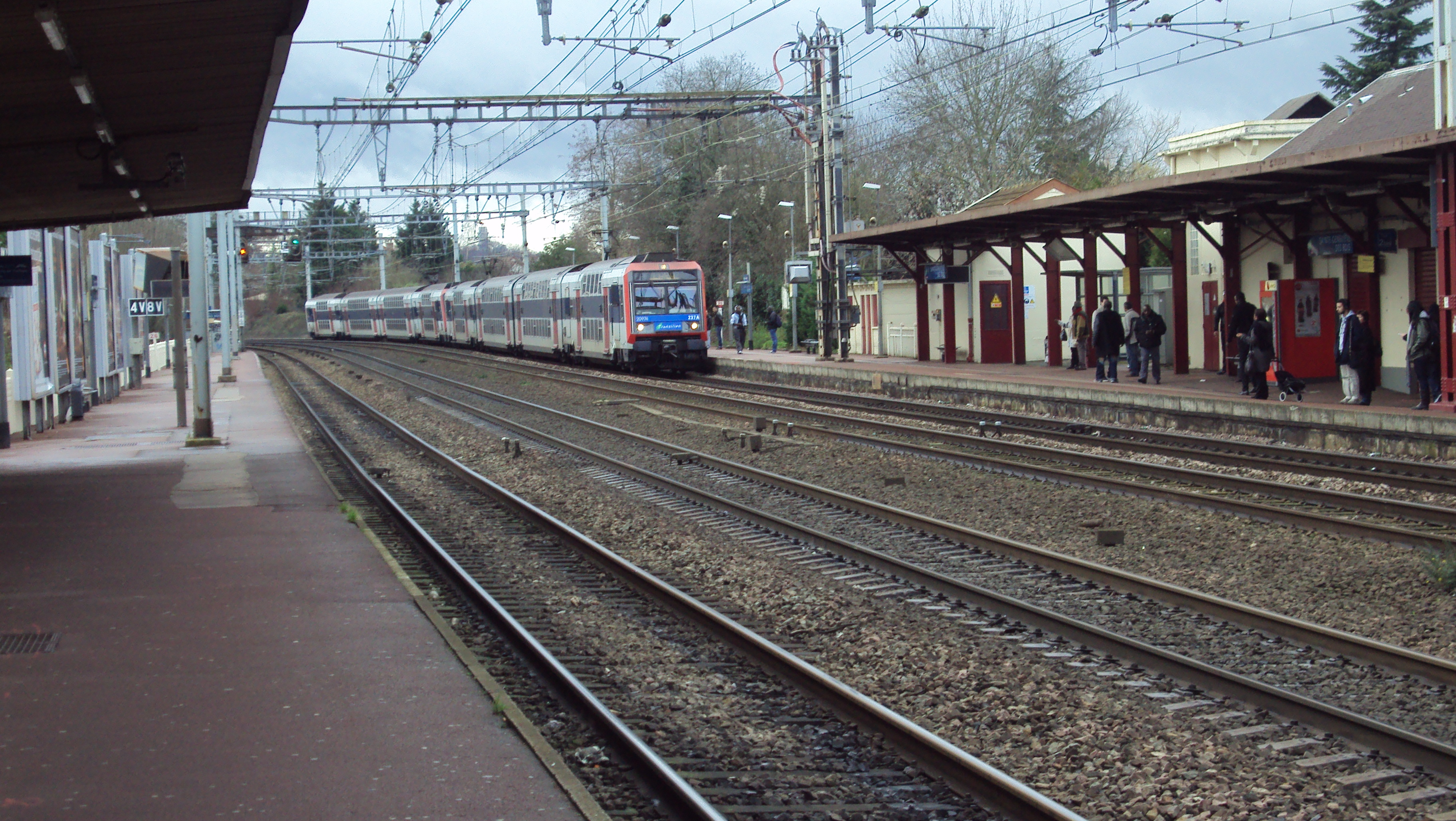
- Sainte-Geneviève-des-Bois railway station

General information
- Location: Sainte-Geneviève-des-Bois, Essonne, Île-de-France, France
- Coordinates: 48°39′11″N 2°18′48″E
- Line: Paris–Bordeaux railway
- Platforms: 2
- Tracks: 4

Other information
- Station code: 87545210
- Fare zone: 5

History
- Opened: 1881

Passengers
- 2024: 3,891,084

Services
| Preceding station | RER | Following station |
|---|---|---|
| Épinay-sur-Orge towards Saint-Quentin-en-Yvelines | RER C | Saint-Michel-sur-Orge towards Saint-Martin-d'Étampes |
| Épinay-sur-Orge towards Versailles Château Rive Gauche | RER C | Saint-Michel-sur-Orge towards Dourdan-la-Forêt |
| Épinay-sur-Orge towards Montigny–Beauchamp | RER C | Saint-Michel-sur-Orge towards Brétigny |
Location

Sainte-Geneviève-des-Bois (French pronunciation: [sɛ̃t ʒənvjɛv de bwa]) is a railway station in Sainte-Geneviève-des-Bois, Essonne, Greater Paris, France. The station was opened in 1881 and is on the Paris–Bordeaux railway. The station is served by Paris' express suburban rail system, the RER. The train services are operated by SNCF.

== Train services ==
The following services serve the station:

- Local services (RER C) Saint-Martin d'Étampes–Juvisy–Paris–Issy–Versailles-Chantiers–Saint-Quentin-en-Yvelines
- Local services (RER C) Dourdan–Juvisy–Paris–Issy–Versailles-Chantiers–Saint-Quentin-en-Yvelines
- Local services (RER C) Dourdan–Juvisy–Paris–Ermont Eaubonne–Montigny
- Local services (RER C) Brétigny–Juvisy–Paris–Ermont Eaubonne–Montigny

== See also ==
- List of stations of the Paris RER
