= Saint-Michel-sur-Orge station =

Railway station in Saint-Michel-sur-Orge, France

Saint-Michel-sur-Orge
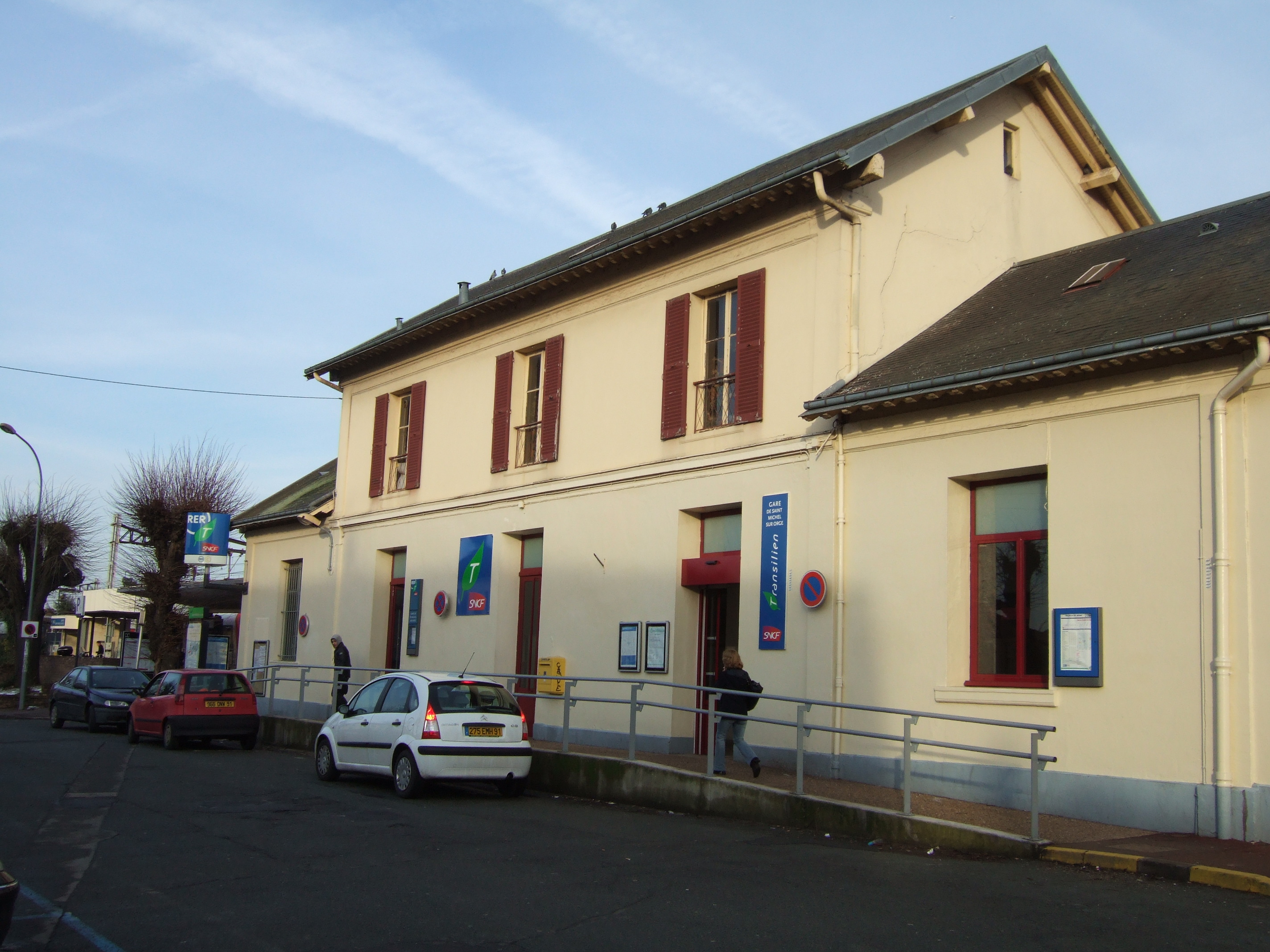
- Saint-Michel-sur-Orge railway station

General information
- Location: Saint-Michel-sur-Orge, Essonne, Île-de-France, France
- Coordinates: 48°38′07″N 2°18′24″E
- Line: Paris–Bordeaux railway
- Platforms: 2
- Tracks: 4

Construction
- Accessible: Yes, by prior reservation

Other information
- Station code: 87545202
- Fare zone: 5

History
- Opened: 5 May 1843

Passengers
- 2024: 3,360,551

Services
Preceding station	RER	Following station
Sainte-Geneviève-des-Bois towards Saint-Quentin-en-Yvelines	RER C	Brétigny towards Saint-Martin-d'Étampes
Sainte-Geneviève-des-Bois towards Versailles Château Rive Gauche	RER C	Brétigny towards Dourdan-la-Forêt
Sainte-Geneviève-des-Bois towards Montigny–Beauchamp	RER C	Brétigny Terminus
Location

Saint-Michel-sur-Orge is a railway station in Saint-Michel-sur-Orge, Essonne, Paris, France. The station was opened in 1843 and is on the Paris–Bordeaux railway. The station is served by Paris' express suburban rail system, the RER. The train services are operated by SNCF.

== Train services ==
The following services serve the station:

- Local services (RER C) Saint-Martin d'Étampes–Juvisy–Paris–Issy–Versailles-Chantiers–Saint-Quentin-en-Yvelines
- Local services (RER C) Dourdan–Juvisy–Paris–Issy–Versailles-Chantiers–Saint-Quentin-en-Yvelines
- Local services (RER C) Dourdan–Juvisy–Paris–Ermont Eaubonne–Montigny
- Local services (RER C) Brétigny–Juvisy–Paris–Ermont Eaubonne–Montigny

== See also ==
- List of stations of the Paris RER
