= Viroflay Rive Gauche station =

French railway station

Viroflay Rive Gauche

General information
- Location: Viroflay, Yvelines, Île-de-France, France
- Coordinates: 48°48′02″N 2°10′17″E
- Line: Paris–Brest railway RER C

Other information
- Station code: 87393215

Passengers
- 2024: 5,781,949

Services
Preceding station	Transilien	Following station
Versailles-Chantiers towards Rambouillet	Line N	Chaville Rive Gauche towards Paris–Montparnasse
Preceding station	RER	Following station
Porchefontaine towards Versailles Château Rive Gauche	RER C	Chaville–Vélizy towards Juvisy
Versailles-Chantiers towards Saint-Quentin-en-Yvelines	RER C	Chaville–Vélizy towards Dourdan-la-Forêt or Saint-Martin-d'Étampes
Location

Viroflay Rive Gauche is a railway station in Viroflay, in the department of Yvelines, France. It is served by RER Line C and Transilien commuter trains.

== See also ==
- List of stations of the Paris RER
