= Juvisy station =

Railway station in Île-de-France, France

Juvisy
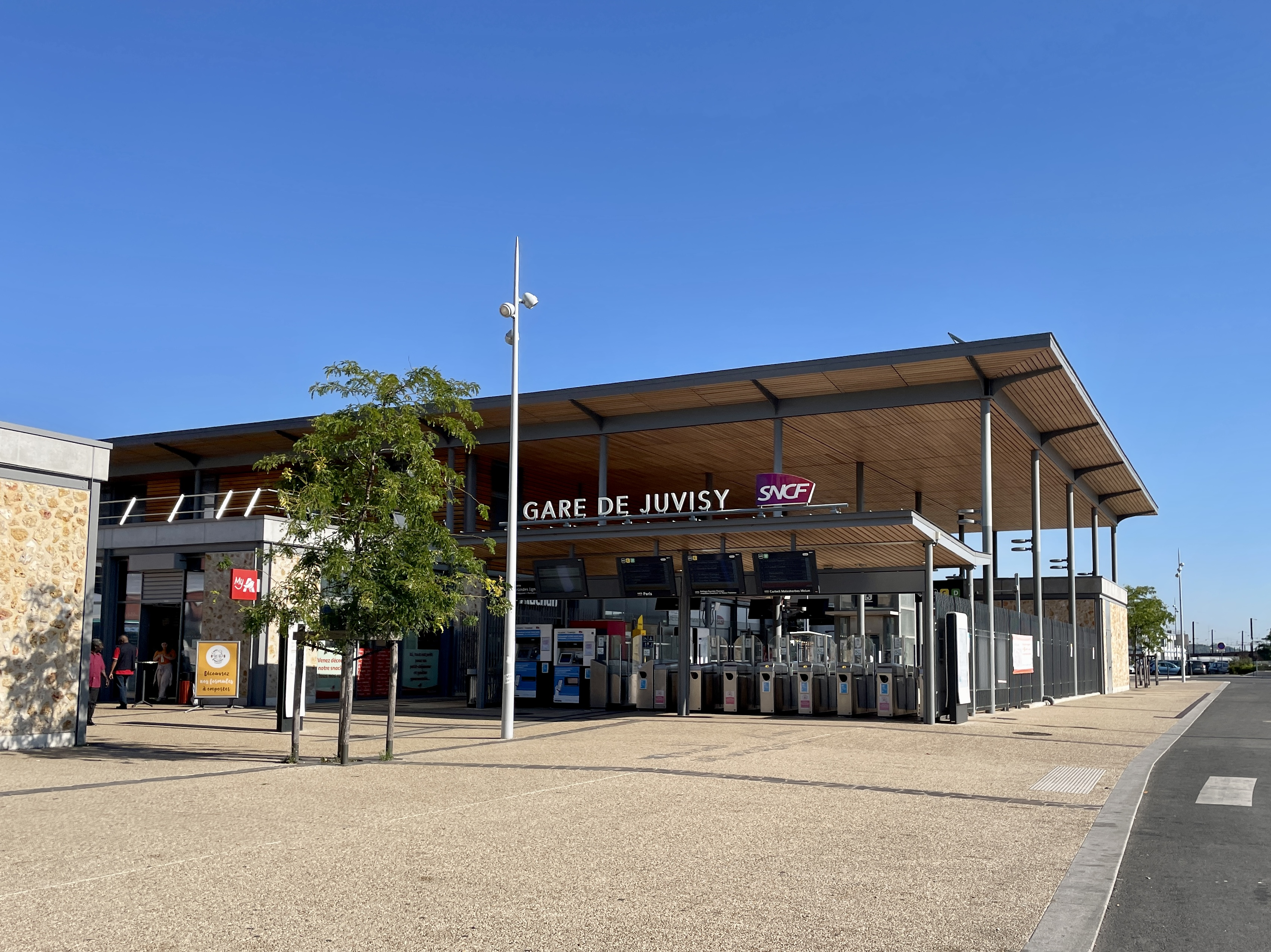
- Juvisy railway station

General information
- Location: Juvisy-sur-Orge, Essonne, Île-de-France, France
- Coordinates: 48°41′21″N 2°22′58″E
- Lines: Paris–Bordeaux railway Villeneuve-Saint-Georges-Montargis railway Grande Ceinture line RER C RER D
- Platforms: 12
- Tracks: 12 + Yards

Construction
- Accessible: Yes, by prior reservation

Other information
- Station code: 87545244
- Fare zone: 4

History
- Opened: 20 September 1840

Passengers
- 2024: 41,881,077

Services
| Preceding station | RER | Following station |
|---|---|---|
| Bibliothèque François Mitterrand towards Saint-Quentin-en-Yvelines | RER C | Savigny-sur-Orge towards Saint-Martin-d'Étampes |
| Choisy-le-Roi towards Versailles Château Rive Gauche | RER C | Savigny-sur-Orge towards Dourdan-la-Forêt |
| Bibliothèque François Mitterrand towards Montigny–Beauchamp | RER C | Savigny-sur-Orge towards Brétigny |
| Athis-Mons towards Versailles Château Rive Gauche | RER C | Savigny-sur-Orge towards Versailles Chantiers |
| Athis-Mons towards Versailles Château Rive Gauche or Saint-Quentin-en-Yvelines | RER C | Savigny-sur-Orge towards Dourdan-la-Forêt, Saint-Martin-d'Étampes or Versailles Chantiers |
| Vigneux-sur-Seine towards Creil | RER D | Viry-Châtillon towards Corbeil-Essonnes |
| Terminus | RER D | Viry-Châtillon towards Malesherbes |
| Preceding station | Ouigo | Following station |
| Paris-Austerlitz Terminus | Train Classique | Massy–Palaiseau towards Nantes |
| Paris-Austerlitz Terminus | Train Classique | Les Aubrais towards Nantes |
Location

Juvisy is a railway station in Juvisy-sur-Orge, Essonne, Île-de-France, France. The station was opened in 1840 and is on the Paris–Bordeaux railway, Villeneuve-Saint-Georges-Montargis railway and Grande Ceinture line, a freight railway around Paris. The station is served by Paris' express suburban rail system, the RER Line C and RER Line D. The train services are operated by SNCF. A TGV high-speed service also serves the station. With about 42 million passengers per year (2024), it is the 7th busiest railway station in France.

== History ==
On 17 September 1840, the Paris to Orléans Railway Company (Compagnie du chemin de fer de Paris à Orléans, or PO) inaugurated the line from Paris-Austerlitz to Corbeil, following the left bank of the Seine. The presence of numerous mills along the Essonne River in Corbeil and the abundance of grain warehouses in the area justified the development of this route. Opened in 1843 by the Paris to Orléans Railway Company, the station became a shared facility in the early 1860s, serving both the PO and the Paris to Lyon and Mediterranean Railway Company (Compagnie des chemins de fer de Paris à Lyon et à la Méditerranée, or PLM), with the addition of a goods station. In the 1880s, services on the Paris Grande Ceinture line were introduced, necessitating the opening of the Juvisy marshalling yard.

In May 1909 a venue for aviation races and exhibitions, Port-Aviation, opened to the public in Viry-Châtillon as the world's first purpose-built aerodrome. Although Savigny-sur-Orge station in nearby Savigny-sur-Orge served the airfield's distinguished visitors, most of the general public attending events at Port-Aviation arrived from Paris by rail at Juvisy station, just under a kilometre (0.6 mile) from the airfield, and the railway station had a sign directing visitors to "Juvisy Airfield." This led the press and post card publishers to refer habitually to Port-Aviation by the misnomer "Juvisy Airfield" and to aviation events there as taking place in "Juvisy" or "Juvisy-sur-Orge." The misnomer "Juvisy Airfield" and the inaccurate association of Juvisy-sur-Orge with the location of Port-Aviation have persisted ever since. The railway operator serving Juvisy station, the Compagnie d'Orléans (Orleans Company), was surprised by the large crowds that attended events at Port-Aviation, leading to packed trains and passengers waiting for hours for a train and sometimes rioting in the stations and on the trains themselves during Port-Aviation's 1909 exhibition season. The Compagnie d'Orléans took measures to correct these problems in time for Port-Aviation's 1910 season, and Juvisy station continued to serve Port-Aviation until the venue hosted its last public events in 1914.

During the first half of the 20th century, passenger and freight traffic continued to increase at Juvisy station until the marshalling yard was destroyed by bombings in 1944. Subsequently, passenger traffic surpassed freight, leading to the closure of the marshalling yard in 1986. A project to redevelop the passenger station emerged at the beginning of the 21st century. From 2014 to 2019, the station received 97 million euros for restructuring works and to create an intermodal hub to facilitate transport changes in the station between the train lines and the 28 bus lines for their 70,000 travelers every day.

In 2018, according to SNCF estimates, the station's annual attendance was 41,423,348, placing it as the seventh station in France in terms of number of passengers, and the number one station in France outside of intramural Paris; it is notably ahead of the Paris-Est and Lyon-Part-Dieu stations.

== Train services ==
The following services serve the station:

- High speed service (TGV) Lille–Aeroport CDG–Orleans–Limoges–Brive
- Local services (RER C) Saint-Martin d'Étampes–Juvisy–Paris–Issy–Versailles-Chantiers–Saint-Quentin-en-Yvelines
- Local services (RER C) Dourdan–Juvisy–Paris–Issy–Versailles-Chantiers–Saint-Quentin-en-Yvelines
- Local services (RER C) Dourdan–Juvisy–Paris–Ermont Eaubonne–Montigny
- Local services (RER C) Brétigny–Juvisy–Paris–Ermont Eaubonne–Montigny
- Local services (RER D) Corbeil-Essonnes–Évry–Juvisy–Villeneuve–Paris–Saint-Denis–Goussainville–Orry-la-Ville–Creil
- Local services (RER D) Juvisy–Évry–Corbeil–Essonnes–Boutigny–Malsherbes
- Local services (RER D) Juvisy–Évry–Corbeil-Essonnes–Melun
