= Chaville–Vélizy station =

Railway station in Viroflay, France

Coordinates: 48.799°N 2.183°E

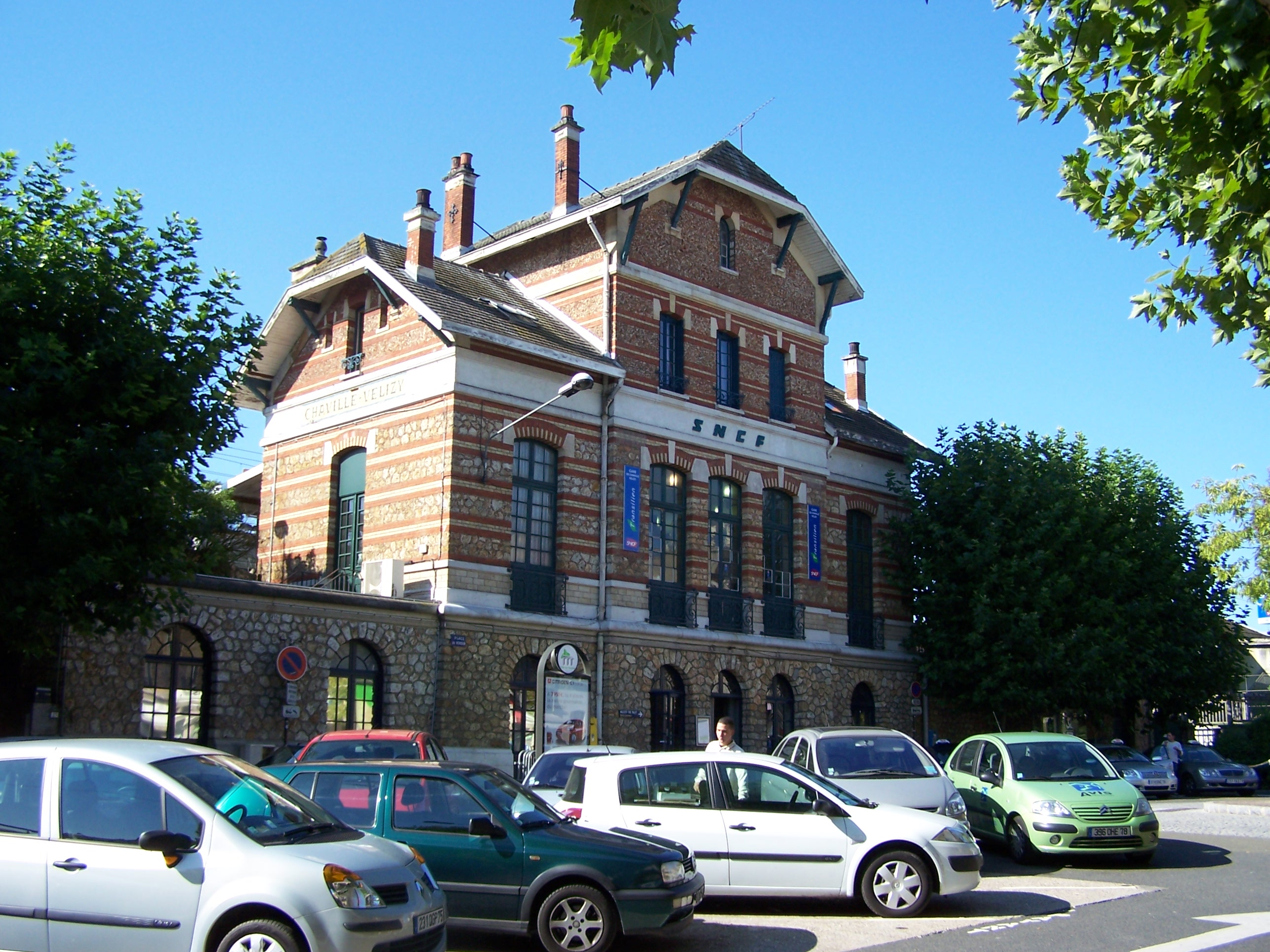
Station building

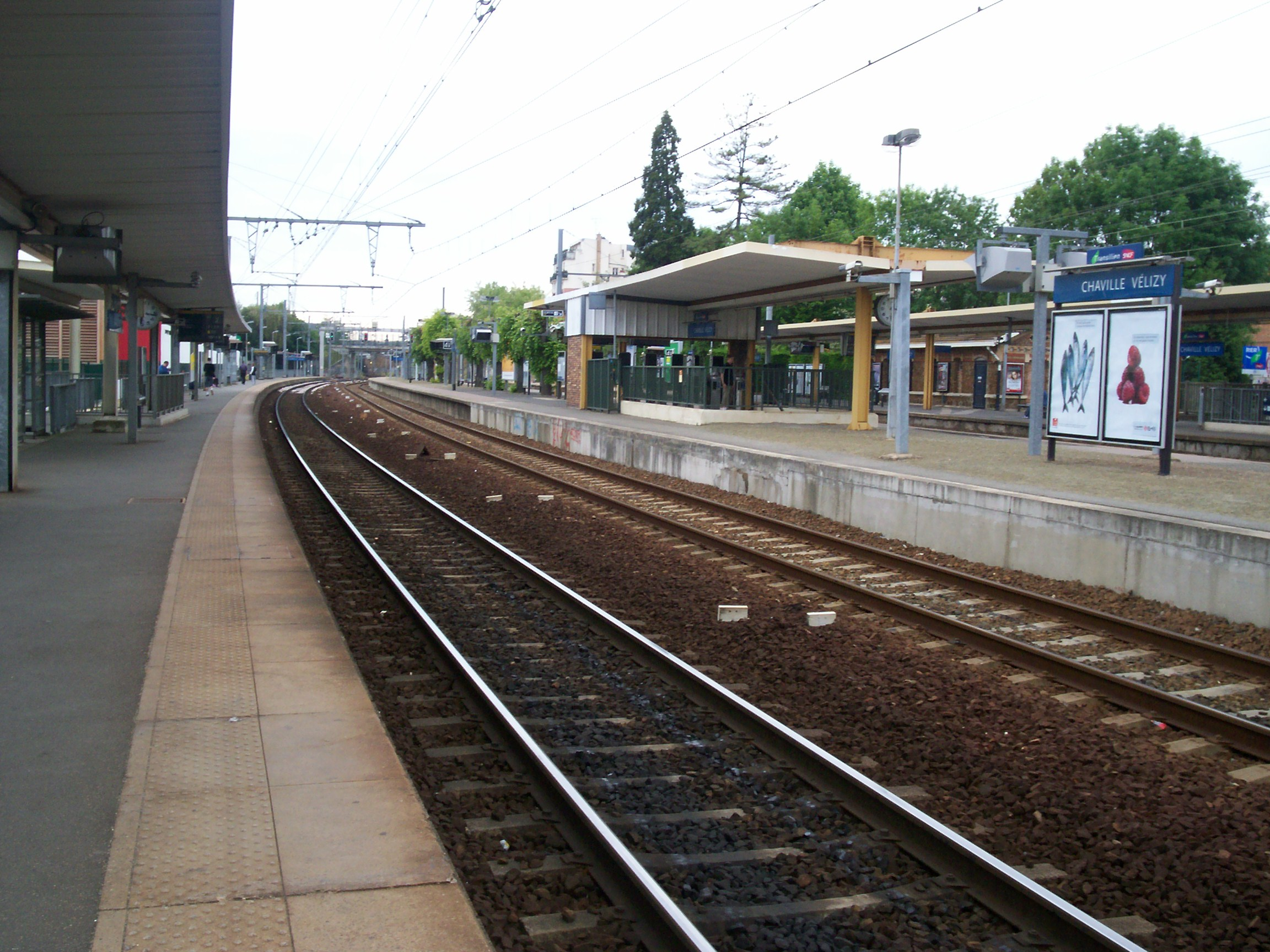
Platforms

Chaville–Vélizy is a railway station of the RER C train line located on the border between Chaville and Vélizy.

Preceding station	RER	Following station
Viroflay-Rive-Gauche towards Versailles Château Rive Gauche or Saint-Quentin-en-Yvelines	RER C	Meudon-Val Fleury towards Massy-Palaiseau, Dourdan-la-Forêt or Saint-Martin-d'Étampes
