= Marolles-en-Hurepoix station =

Railway station in Marolles-en-Hurepoix, France

Marolles-en-Hurepoix
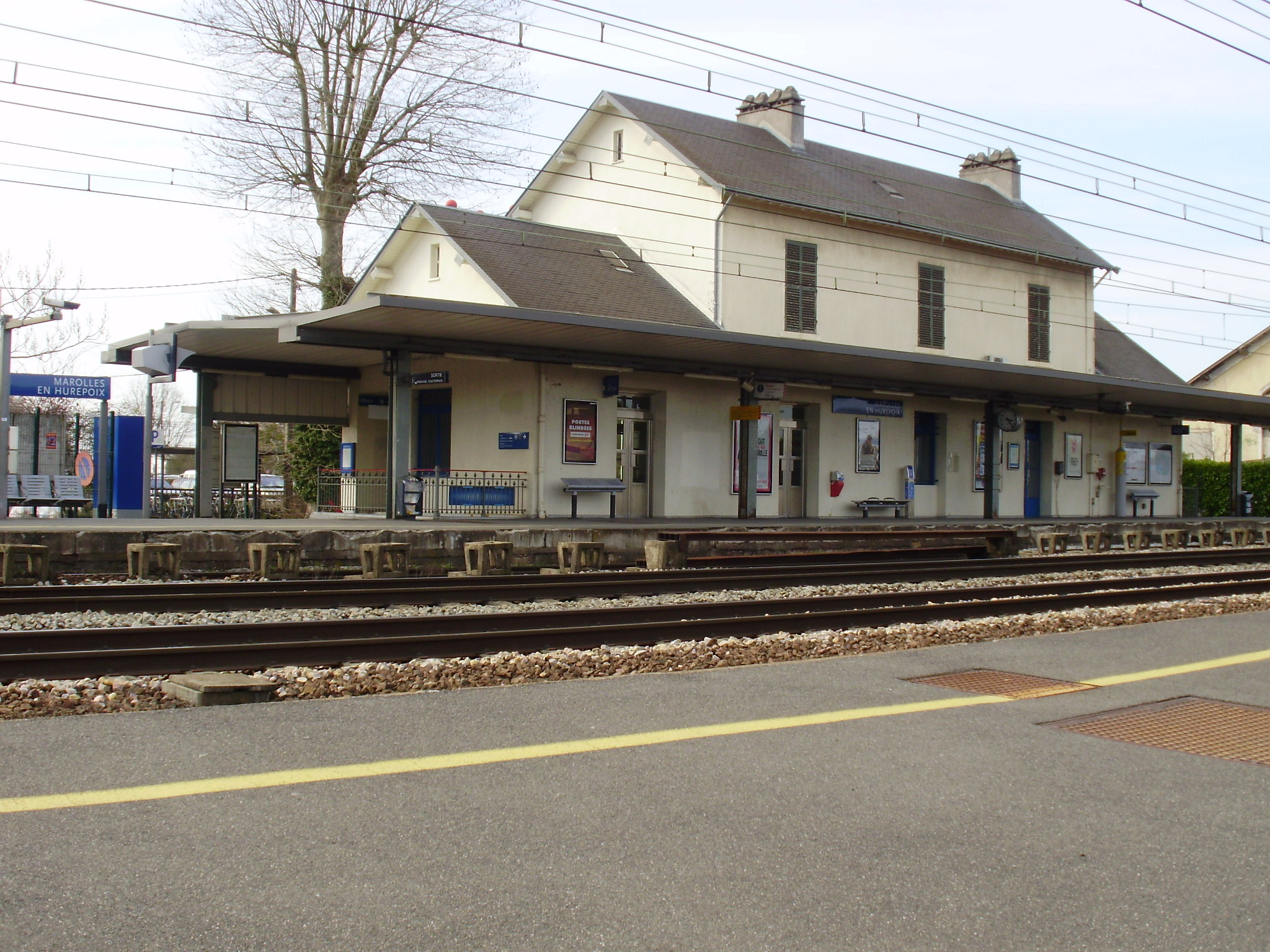
- Marolles-en-Hurepoix railway station

General information
- Location: Marolles-en-Hurepoix, Essonne, Île-de-France, France
- Coordinates: 48°33′54″N 2°17′28″E
- Line: Paris–Bordeaux railway
- Platforms: 2
- Tracks: 4

Other information
- Station code: 87545186
- Fare zone: 5

History
- Opened: 5 May 1843

Passengers
- 2024: 1,397,187

Services
Preceding station	RER	Following station
Brétigny towards Saint-Quentin-en-Yvelines	RER C	Bouray towards Saint-Martin-d'Étampes
Location

Marolles-en-Hurepoix (French pronunciation: [maʁɔl ɑ̃ yʁpwa]) is a railway station in Marolles-en-Hurepoix, Essonne, France. The station was opened in 1843 and is on the Paris–Bordeaux railway. It is served by Paris's express suburban rail system, the RER (Line C). The train services are operated by the SNCF.

== Train services ==
The following services serve the station:

- Local services (RER C) Saint-Martin d'Étampes–Juvisy–Paris–Issy–Versailles-Chantiers–Saint-Quentin-en-Yvelines

== See also ==
- List of stations of the Paris RER
