= Saint-Cyr station =

French railway station

Saint-Cyr

General information
- Location: Saint-Cyr-l'École, Yvelines, Île-de-France, France
- Coordinates: 48°47′56″N 2°04′25″E
- Lines: Paris–Brest railway, Saint-Cyr–Surdon railway RER C

Other information
- Station code: 87393223

Passengers
- 2024: 6,774,075

Services
Preceding station	RER	Following station
Saint-Quentin-en-Yvelines Terminus	RER C	Versailles-Chantiers towards Saint-Martin-d'Étampes
Preceding station	Transilien	Following station
Fontenay-le-Fleury towards Mantes-la-Jolie	Line N	Versailles-Chantiers towards Paris–Montparnasse
Saint-Quentin-en-Yvelines towards Rambouillet	Line N	Versailles-Chantiers towards Paris–Montparnasse
Saint-Quentin-en-Yvelines towards La Verrière	Line U	Versailles-Chantiers towards La Défense
Location

Saint-Cyr is a railway station in Saint-Cyr-l'École, in the department of Yvelines, France. It is served by RER Line C and Transilien commuter trains. It is at the junction of the Paris–Brest railway with the line towards Caen and Granville.

== See also ==
- List of stations of the Paris RER
