= Gare d'Austerlitz =

Terminal railway station in Paris, France

Paris Austerlitz
- Façade facing the Seine in 2022

General information
- Location: 85 Quai d'Austerlitz; Paris; France
- Coordinates: 48°50′32″N 2°21′57″E
- Line: Paris–Bordeaux railway
- Tracks: 25
- Connections: at Metro station; RATP Bus: 24 57 61 63 89 91 215; Noctilien: N02 N31 N133

Construction
- Accessible: RER: No
- Architect: Pierre-Louis Renaud

Other information
- Station code: 87547000 / 87547026 (RER)
- Fare zone: 1 (RER)

History
- Opened: 20 September 1840

Passengers
- 2024: 23,798,578
- Rank: 18th in France
Services
Preceding station	Le Réseau Rémi	Following station
Étampes towards Orléans	1.1	Terminus
Dourdan towards Vendôme	2.10	Terminus
Preceding station	RER	Following station
Saint-Michel–Notre-Dame towards Pontoise, Versailles Château Rive Gauche or Saint-Quentin-en-Yvelines	RER C	Bibliothèque François Mitterrand towards Massy-Palaiseau, Dourdan-la-Forêt or Saint-Martin-d'Étampes
Preceding station	Ouigo	Following station
Terminus	Train Classique	Juvisy towards Nantes
Preceding station	SNCF	Following station
Terminus	Intercités	Les Aubrais towards Toulouse
Terminus	Intercités (night)	Les Aubrais towards Albi-Ville
Terminus	Intercités (night)	Crest towards Briançon
Terminus	Intercités (night)	Les Aubrais towards Hendaye
Terminus	Intercités (night)	Les Aubrais towards Latour-de-Carol
Terminus	Intercités (night)	Marseille-Blancarde towards Nice-Ville
Terminus	Intercités (night)	Les Aubrais towards Cerbère
Terminus	Intercités (night)	Les Aubrais towards Toulouse
Connections to other stations
Preceding station	Paris Metro	Following station
Saint-Marcel towards Place d'Italie	Line 5 transfer at Gare d'Austerlitz	Quai de la Rapée towards Bobigny–Pablo Picasso
Jussieu towards Boulogne–Pont de Saint-Cloud	Line 10 transfer at Gare d'Austerlitz	Terminus
Location
- Location within Paris

Gare d'Austerlitz (English: Austerlitz station), officially Paris Austerlitz, is one of the seven large Paris railway terminal stations. The station is located on the left bank of the Seine in the southeastern part of the city, in the 13th arrondissement. It is the start of the Paris–Bordeaux railway; the line to Toulouse is connected to this line. In 1997, the Ministry of Culture designated the Gare d'Austerlitz a historical monument; it became the fifth large railway station in Paris to receive such a label, as currently only Montparnasse has not been attributed it.

Since the opening of the LGV Atlantique – ending at Gare Montparnasse – Austerlitz has lost most of its long-distance southwestern services. It is used by some 30 million passengers annually, about half the number passing through Montparnasse. The Elipsos night trains operated jointly by Renfe and SNCF operated from here to Madrid and Barcelona from 2001 to 2013. With the start of a direct TGV from Paris to Barcelona, on 15 December 2013, these services were discontinued.

== History ==
=== 1840 station ===
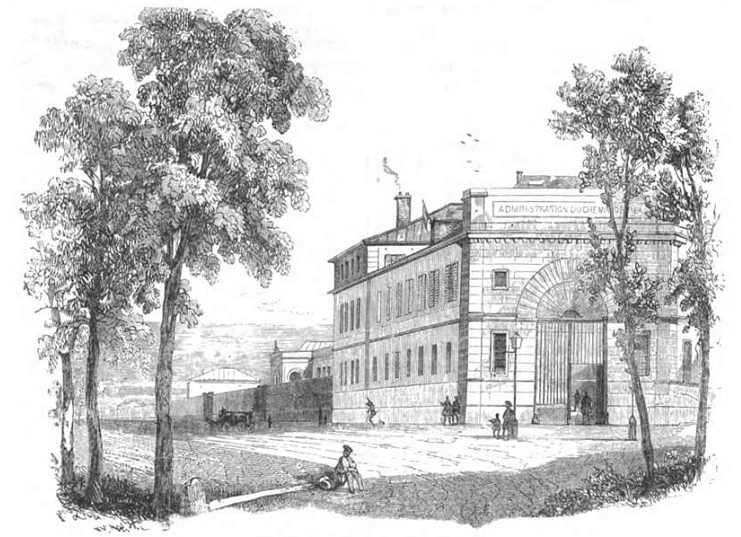
Gare d'Orléans in 1843.

The Gare d'Austerlitz was the main station in Paris for the Paris-Orléans (PO) company and was originally called the Gare d'Orléans station. The station is near the Quai d'Austerlitz, and the Pont d'Austerlitz. These were named after the Czech town once known as Austerlitz (today Slavkov u Brna). Napoleon I defeated the Third Coalition there on 2 December 1805 at the Battle of Austerlitz.

Built from 1838, the first platform was built slightly back from the current location of the station by the architect Félix-Emmanuel Callet and began service on 20 September 1840, on the occasion of the opening of the Paris-Corbeil line, which was extended to Orléans in May 1843. Part of the rue Poliveau was cut by this construction, and another part, located near the Seine, took the name of rue Jouffroy.

The first expansion took place in 1846.

=== 1867 station ===
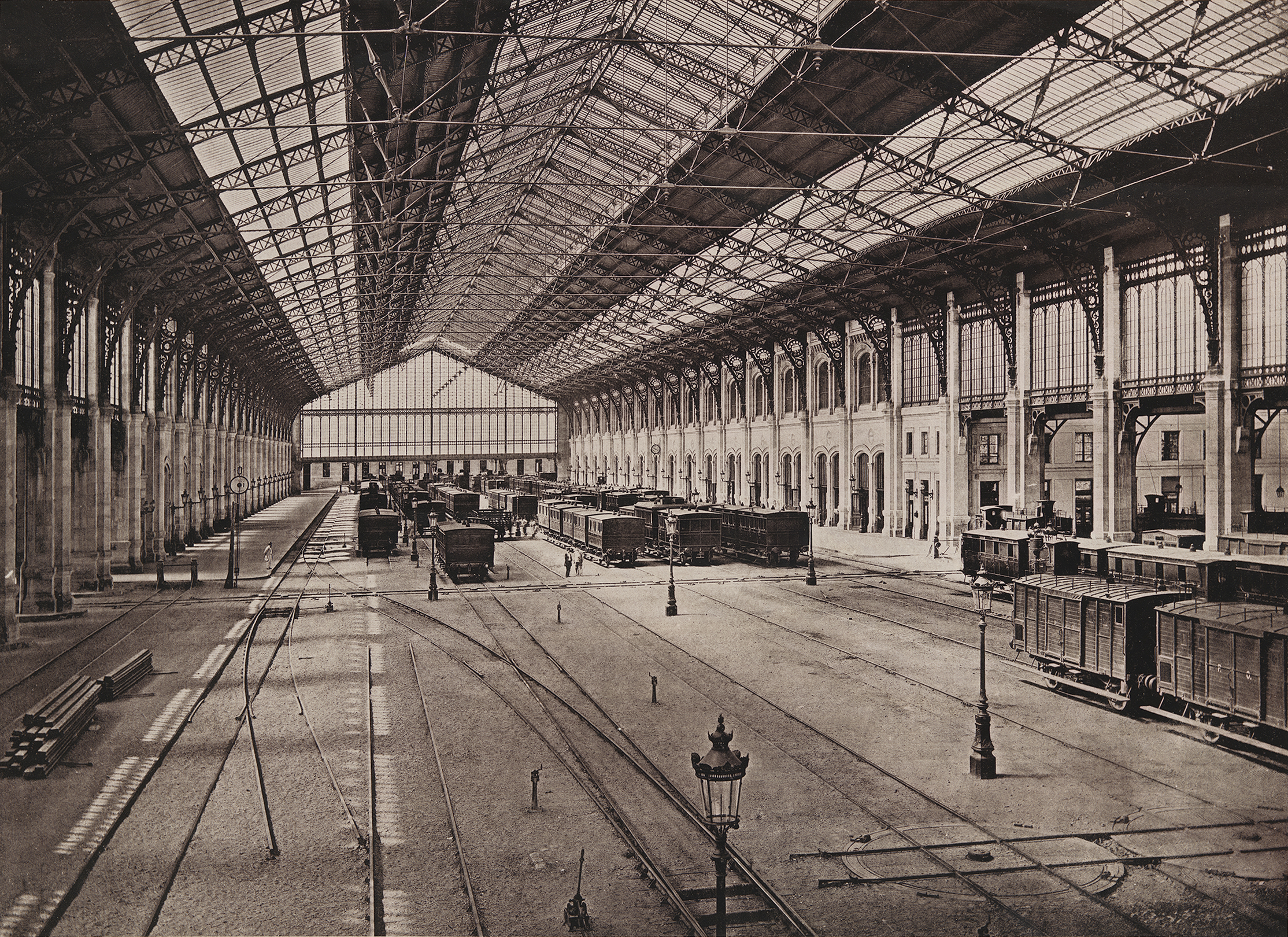
Gare d'Austerlitz in 1883.

Once demolished, the station was rebuilt between 1862 and 1869, by Pierre-Louis Renaud (1819–1897), chief architect of the Paris-Orléans company. It included a large iron train shed, 51.25 metres (168 ft 2 in) wide and 280 metres (920 ft) long (the second largest in France after Bordeaux), designed by Ferdinand Mathieu and carried out by the construction workshops of Schneider & Co at Le Creusot and Chalon-sur-Saône. This vast space was also used as a workshop for making gas balloons, during the Siege of Paris in 1870. Also built was the departure hall to the north, the perpendicular building of the restaurant buffet, the arrival hall to the south, as well as the Paris-Orléans railway administration building at the west end of the shed, on Place Valhubert, with a Belle Époque style façade. The administrative building was an extension of the iron roof, whose pediment was invisible from Place Valhubert. This arrangement, as well as the choice of side entrances, was unusual for a terminal station.

=== Evolution since 1900 ===
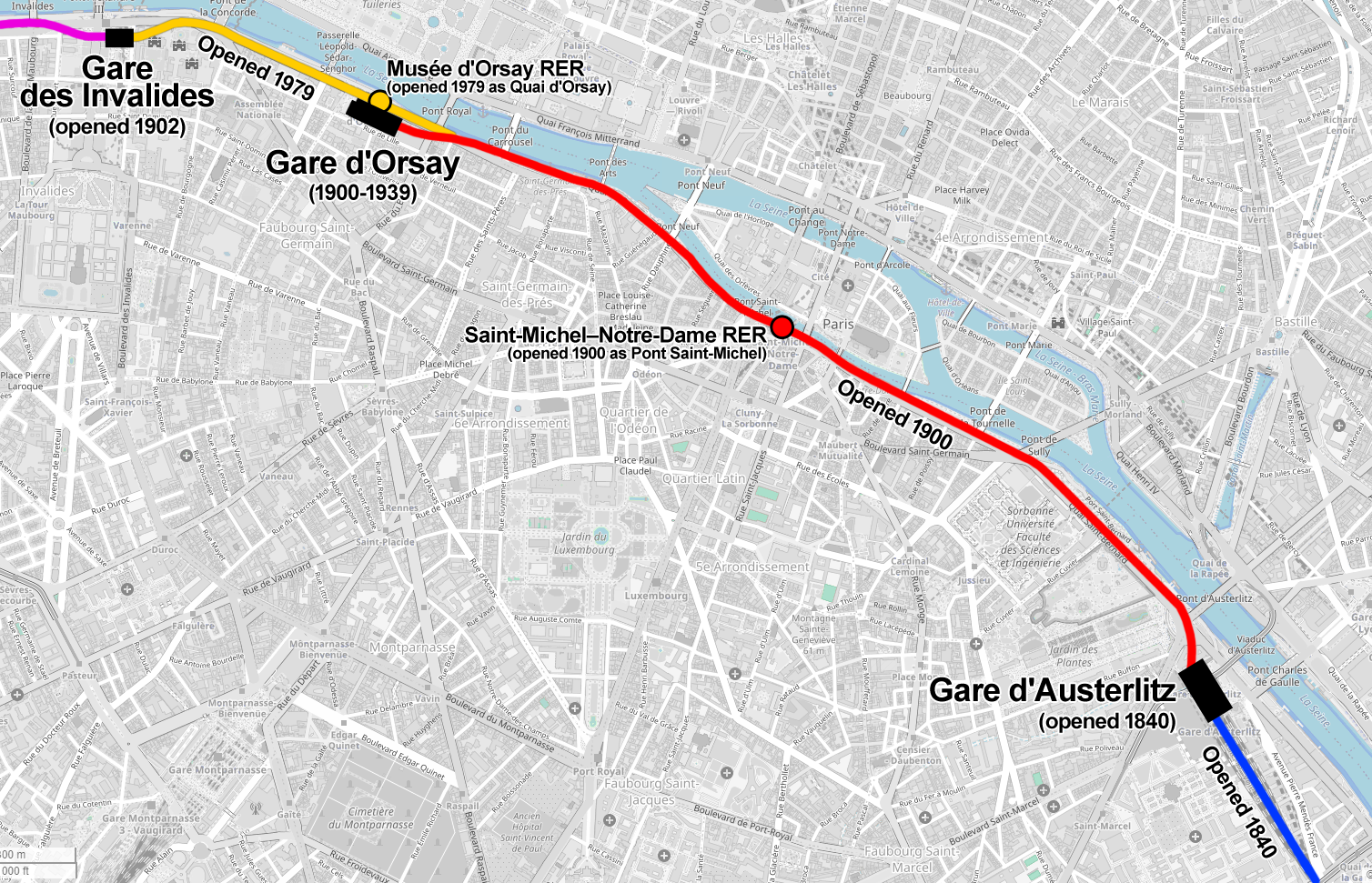
The new railway line extension opened in 1900, linking Gare d'Austerlitz and Gare d'Orsay

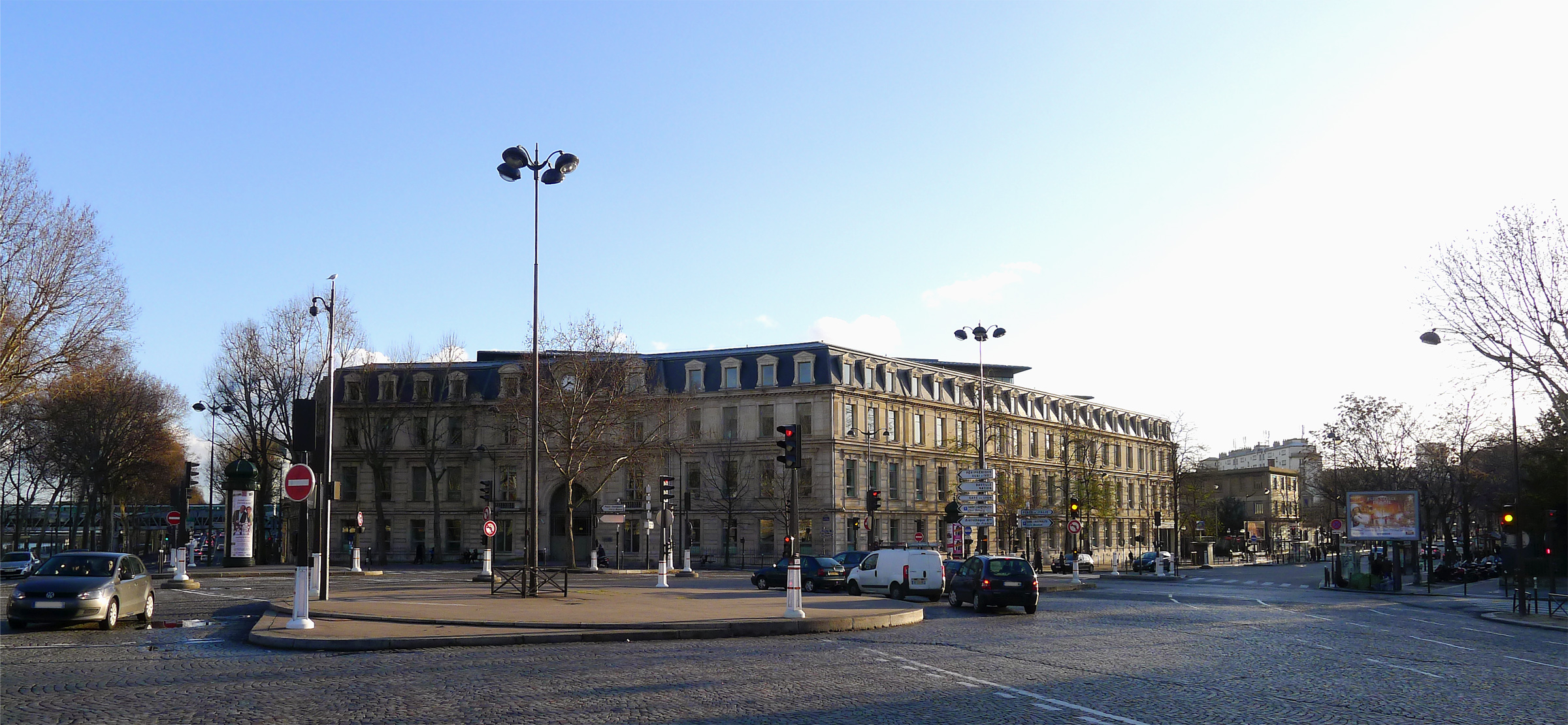
Place Valhubert and administrative building at the Gare d'Austerlitz.

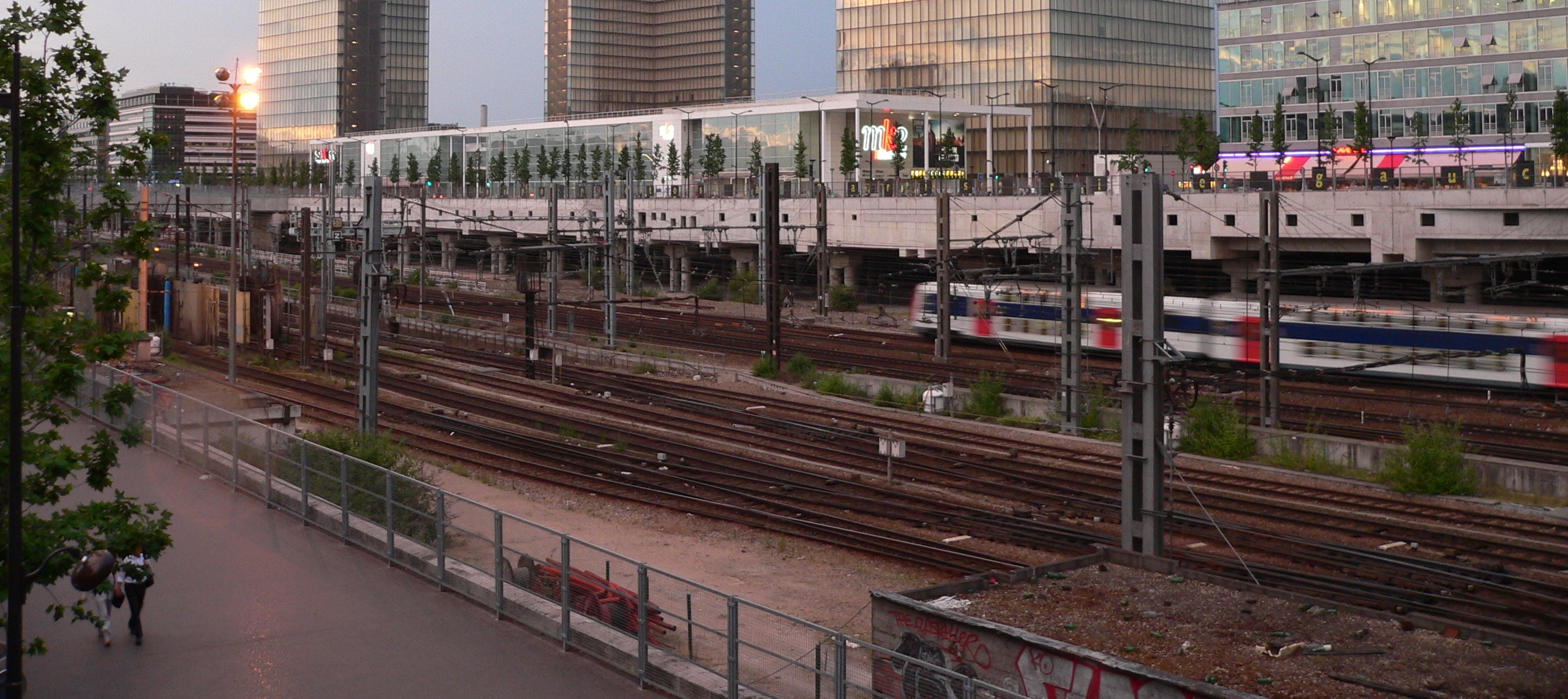
The tracks to Gare d'Austerlitz (seen here with a suburban train) run south of the Bibliothèque nationale de France.

In 1900, the Paris-Orléans company extended its railway line towards the centre of the capital, with the Gare d'Orsay becoming the new end of the line, when it entered service on 28 May on the occasion of the 1900 Universal Exposition. The design was by architect Victor Laloux, and the construction by the contractor Léon Chagnaud. In 1906, the great train shed of Gare d'Austerlitz was literally pierced through its width by the Metro 5 line by an extension of a viaduct crossing the Seine. An elevated station was located within the station's roof.

In 1910, during the great flood of the Seine, the station was flooded and rail traffic completely interrupted from 31 January to 9 February. During this period, the departure and arrival of the trains were terminated at Gare de Juvisy.

In 1926, the Paris–Vierzon line was electrified to 1500 V, so no more steam engines entered Austerlitz. It was the first station in Paris to no longer be served by steam trains.

In 1939, the Gare d'Orsay saw its function limited to suburban traffic, and the Gare d'Austerlitz once again became the terminus station for the main lines. In 1979, a 1-kilometre (0.62 mi) extension to the Orsay line was built in a tunnel along the bank of the Seine, connecting the line to the Gare des Invalides, the terminus of the Rive Gauche line to Versailles. This new Transversal Rive Gauche line is today the central section of Line C of the Parisian commuter rail system, the Réseau Express Régional (RER).

On 28 February 1997, parts of the Gare d'Austerlitz were classified as monuments historiques, especially its facades and glass roof.

=== Future ===
A large refurbishment project of the Paris Austerlitz is currently under way. Four new platforms are being constructed and all the existing tracks are being refurbished. The interior will be rebuilt in order to handle LGV Sud-Est and LGV Atlantique services, partially transferred from the Gare de Lyon and Gare Montparnasse, both of which are at maximum capacity. All the work is planned to be completed by 2020, and will double the activity at the station.

== Train services ==
The following services currently call at Paris-Austerlitz:

- intercity services (Intercités) Paris–Orléans
- intercity services (Intercités) Paris–Orléans–Blois–Tours
- intercity services (Intercités) Paris–Orléans–Vierzon–Bourges
- intercity services (Intercités) Paris–Vierzon–Limoges–Brive–Toulouse
- night services (Intercités de Nuit) Paris–Toulouse–Latour-de-Carol
- night services (Intercités de Nuit) Paris–Orléans–Cerbère/Albi
- night services (Intercités de Nuit) Paris–Gap–Briançon

Gare d'Austerlitz also hosts stations on the Paris Métro (lines 5 and 10, see Gare d'Austerlitz (Paris Métro)) and RER.

== See also ==
- List of Paris railway stations
- List of stations of the Paris RER
- List of stations of the Paris Métro
