= Brétigny station =

Railway station in Brétigny-sur-Orge, France

Brétigny
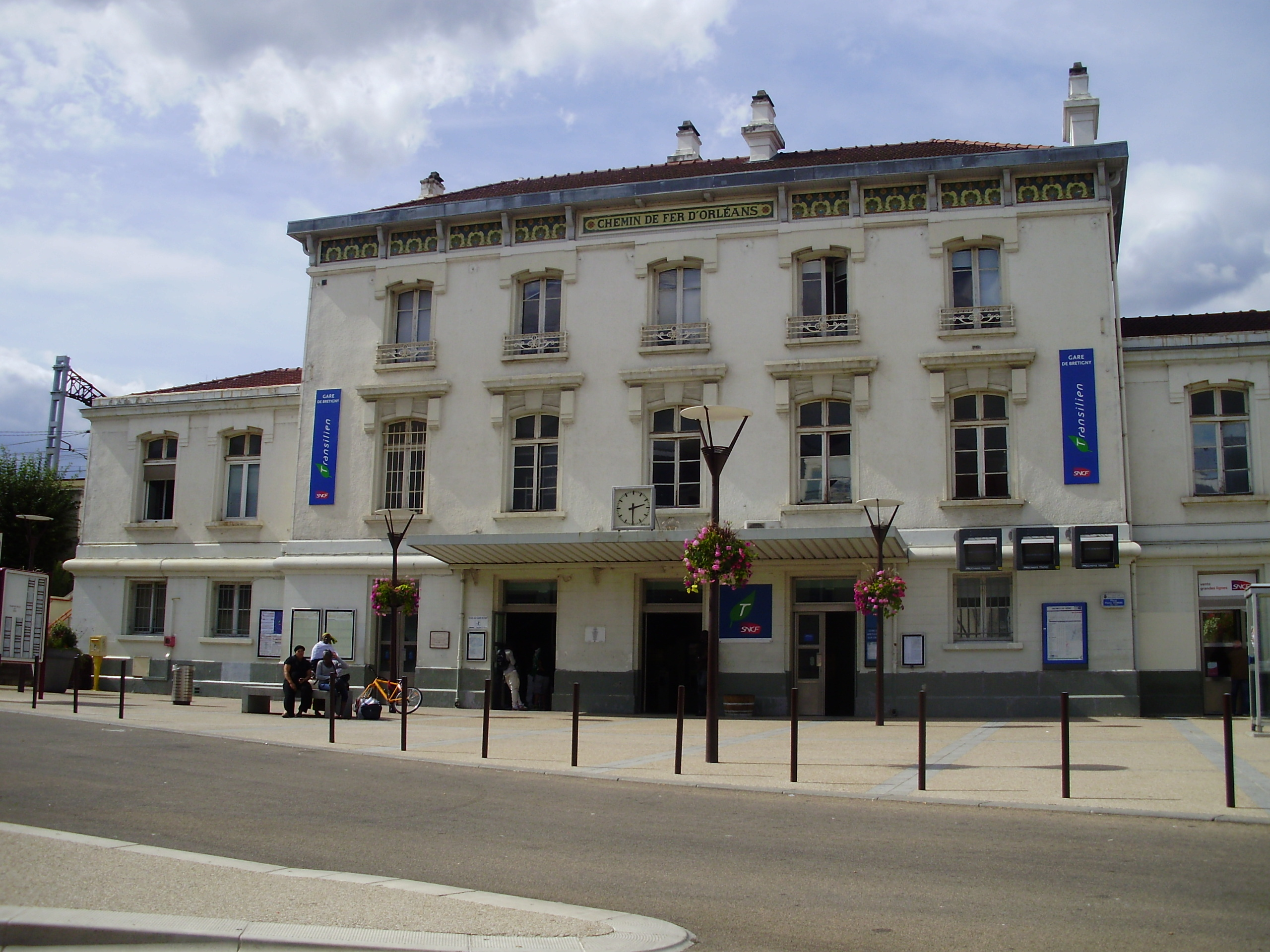
- Brétigny railway station

General information
- Location: Brétigny-sur-Orge, Essonne, Île-de-France, France
- Coordinates: 48°36′24″N 2°18′07″E
- Lines: Paris–Bordeaux railway Paris–Tours railway
- Platforms: 7
- Tracks: 9

Construction
- Accessible: Yes, by prior reservation

Other information
- Station code: 87545194
- Fare zone: 5

History
- Opened: 1865

Passengers
- 2024: 6,450,745

Services
Preceding station	RER	Following station
Saint-Michel-sur-Orge towards Saint-Quentin-en-Yvelines	RER C	Marolles-en-Hurepoix towards Saint-Martin-d'Étampes
Saint-Michel-sur-Orge towards Versailles Château Rive Gauche	RER C	La Norville–Saint-Germain-lès-Arpajon towards Dourdan-la-Forêt
Saint-Michel-sur-Orge towards Montigny–Beauchamp	RER C	Terminus
Location

Brétigny is a railway station in Brétigny-sur-Orge, Essonne, Paris, France. The station was opened in 1865 and is located on the Paris–Bordeaux railway and Paris–Tours railway. The station is served by Paris' express suburban rail system, the RER. The train services are operated by SNCF.

It is 20 kilometres (12 mi) south of the centre of Paris.

== 2013 derailment ==
On 12 July 2013, an intercity train from Paris Gare d'Austerlitz to Limoges derailed and crashed at the station, killing at least six people and injuring "dozens" more. 385 passengers were on board at the time of the crash.

Initial reports suggest the train, which was not scheduled to stop at the station, split in two, causing the rear four carriages to collide with the station platforms.

== Train services ==
The following services serve the station:

- Local services (RER C) Saint-Martin d'Étampes–Juvisy–Paris–Issy–Versailles-Chantiers–Saint-Quentin-en-Yvelines
- Local services (RER C) Dourdan–Juvisy–Paris–Issy–Versailles-Chantiers–Saint-Quentin-en-Yvelines
- Local services (RER C) Dourdan–Juvisy–Paris–Ermont Eaubonne–Montigny
- Local services (RER C) Brétigny–Juvisy–Paris–Ermont Eaubonne–Montigny

== See also ==
- List of stations of the Paris RER
