= Versailles Chantiers station =

Railway station in Versailles, France

Versailles Chantiers
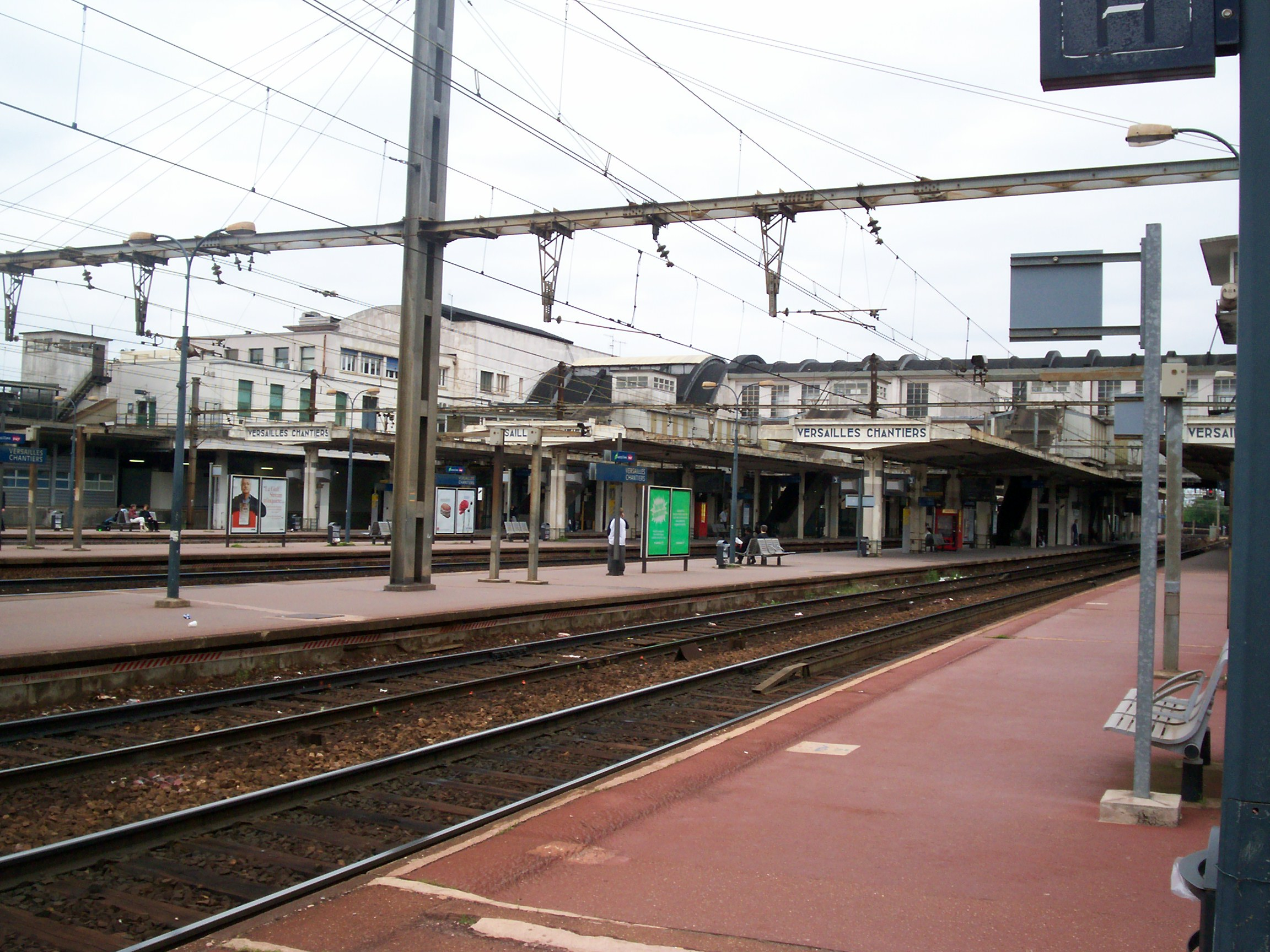
- Versailles Chantiers station platforms

General information
- Location: 4 Rue de l'Abbé Rousseau; Versailles; France
- Coordinates: 48°47′45″N 2°8′10″E
- Operator: SNCF
- Line: Paris–Brest railway
- Platforms: 4 island platforms
- Tracks: 8 + through and siding tracks
- Connections: Grand Versailles: 6201, 6202, 6204, 6206, 6211, 6213, 6240; Île-de-France Ouest: 5146; Saint-Quentin-en-Yvelines: 5102, 5134, 5140, 5141; Saint-Germain Boucles de Seine: 1; Vélizy Vallées: 6122, 6124, 6160, 6161, 6162, 6163, 6164, 6179, 6180, 6182, Soirée Versailles Chantiers; Noctilien: N145

Construction
- Structure type: At-grade
- Cycle facilities: Racks
- Accessible: Yes, by prior reservation

Other information
- Station code: 87393009
- Fare zone: 4

History
- Opened: 12 July 1849
- Rebuilt: 1932

Passengers
- 2024: 24,372,929

Services
| Preceding station | SNCF | Following station |
|---|---|---|
| Mantes-la-Jolie towards Le Havre | TGV | Massy TGV towards Marseille |
| Preceding station | Le Réseau Rémi | Following station |
| Rambouillet towards Le Mans | 3.2 | Paris–Montparnasse Terminus |
| Preceding station | Transilien | Following station |
| Saint-Cyr towards Rambouillet | Line N | Viroflay-Rive-Gauche towards Paris–Montparnasse |
| Saint-Cyr towards La Verrière | Line U | Chaville-Rive-Droite towards La Défense |
| Terminus | Line V | Petit Jouy - Les Loges towards Massy-Palaiseau |
| Preceding station | RER | Following station |
| Saint-Cyr towards Saint-Quentin-en-Yvelines | RER C | Viroflay-Rive-Gauche towards Dourdan-la-Forêt or Saint-Martin-d'Étampes |
| Preceding station | TER Normandie | Following station |
| Dreux towards Granville | Krono | Paris–Montparnasse Terminus |
| Preceding station | Ouigo | Following station |
| Chartres towards Nantes | Train Classique | Massy-Palaiseau towards Paris–Austerlitz |
Location

Versailles Chantiers station (French pronunciation: [vɛʁsɑj ʃɑ̃tje]) is the principal railway station serving the city of Versailles, a wealthy suburb located west of Paris, France. The station is located at the junction of the Paris–Brest railway and the Grande Ceinture line. The "Chantiers" in the station name comes from its location on the Rue des Chantiers.

The station is operated by SNCF, the French national railway. It is served by TGV inOui and the Ouigo Train Classique service, along with several regional train networks, including the RER C, Transilien lines N, U, and V, along with the TER Centre-Val de Loire and TER Normandie networks.

The station is one of several in Versailles but is not as close to the Palace of Versailles as the Versailles Château Rive Gauche station.

== See also ==
- Other train stations in Versailles:
  - Versailles Château Rive Gauche station (closest to Palace of Versailles)
  - Versailles Rive Droite station
  - Montreuil station
  - Porchefontaine station
