= Montreuil station =

Railway station in Versailles, France

Montreuil
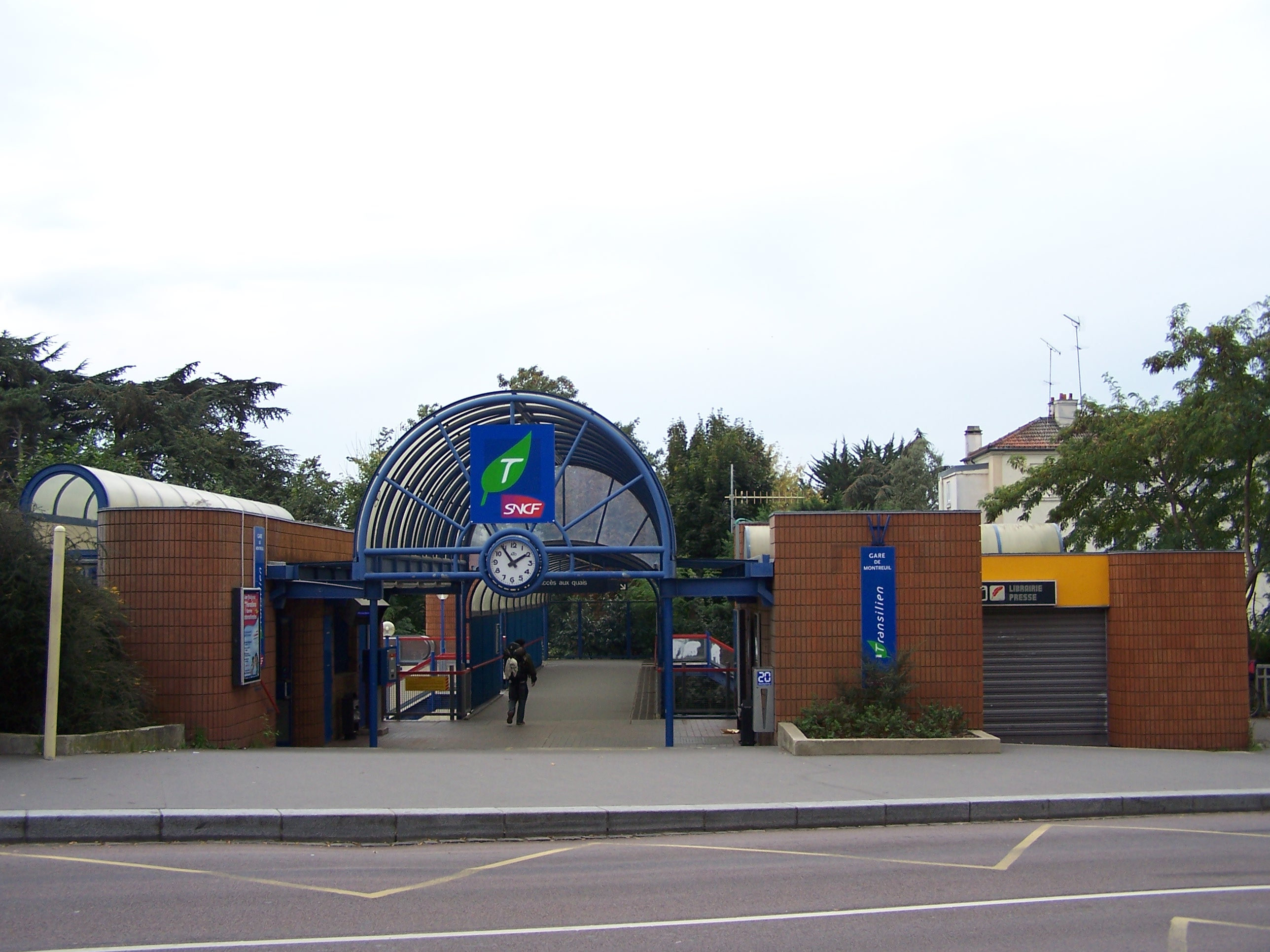
- Montreuil station entrance

General information
- Location: Rue de la Bonne Aventure; Versailles; France
- Coordinates: 48°48′24″N 2°09′04″E
- Operator: SNCF
- Platforms: 2 side platforms
- Tracks: 2

Construction
- Structure type: Below-grade
- Parking: Yes
- Cycle facilities: Parking station, racks
- Accessible: Yes, by prior reservation

Other information
- Station code: 87382879
- Fare zone: 4

Passengers
- 2024: 2,207,745

Services
Preceding station	Transilien	Following station
Versailles Rive Droite Terminus	Line L	Viroflay-Rive-Droite towards Paris–Saint Lazare
Location

Montreuil station is a railway station in the commune of Versailles (department of Yvelines), in the Montreuil neighborhood. It is in the Île-de-France region of France and is part of the Transilien rail network, on the Paris–Saint Lazare –Versailles Rive Droite railway.

== The station ==
The station is served by line L trains of the Transilien Paris – Saint Lazare network. There is a train every 15 minutes in each direction during the day, and every 30 minutes in the evening. All trains to or from Versailles Rive Droite also serve the Montreuil station.

In 2014, a point of sale is open every day from 5:55 to 1:55. ATMs Transilien and TGV are also available. A Relay press shop is present, as well as distributors of beverages or confections, automatic photography booth and a telephone booth. In 2015, a service of removing automated packages, named Pick Up Station, was installed between the parking of the station and the passenger building. Lifts are also available on two platforms for persons with reduced mobility. A bike park is located outside the station, and a free relay of 50 to 100 places Park is built for vehicles.

== See also ==
- Other train stations in Versailles:
  - Versailles Chantiers station (main station)
  - Versailles Château Rive Gauche station (closest to Palace of Versailles)
  - Versailles Rive Droite station
  - Porchefontaine station
