= Montigny–Beauchamp station =

Railway station in France

Coordinates: 49°00′26″N 2°11′51″E

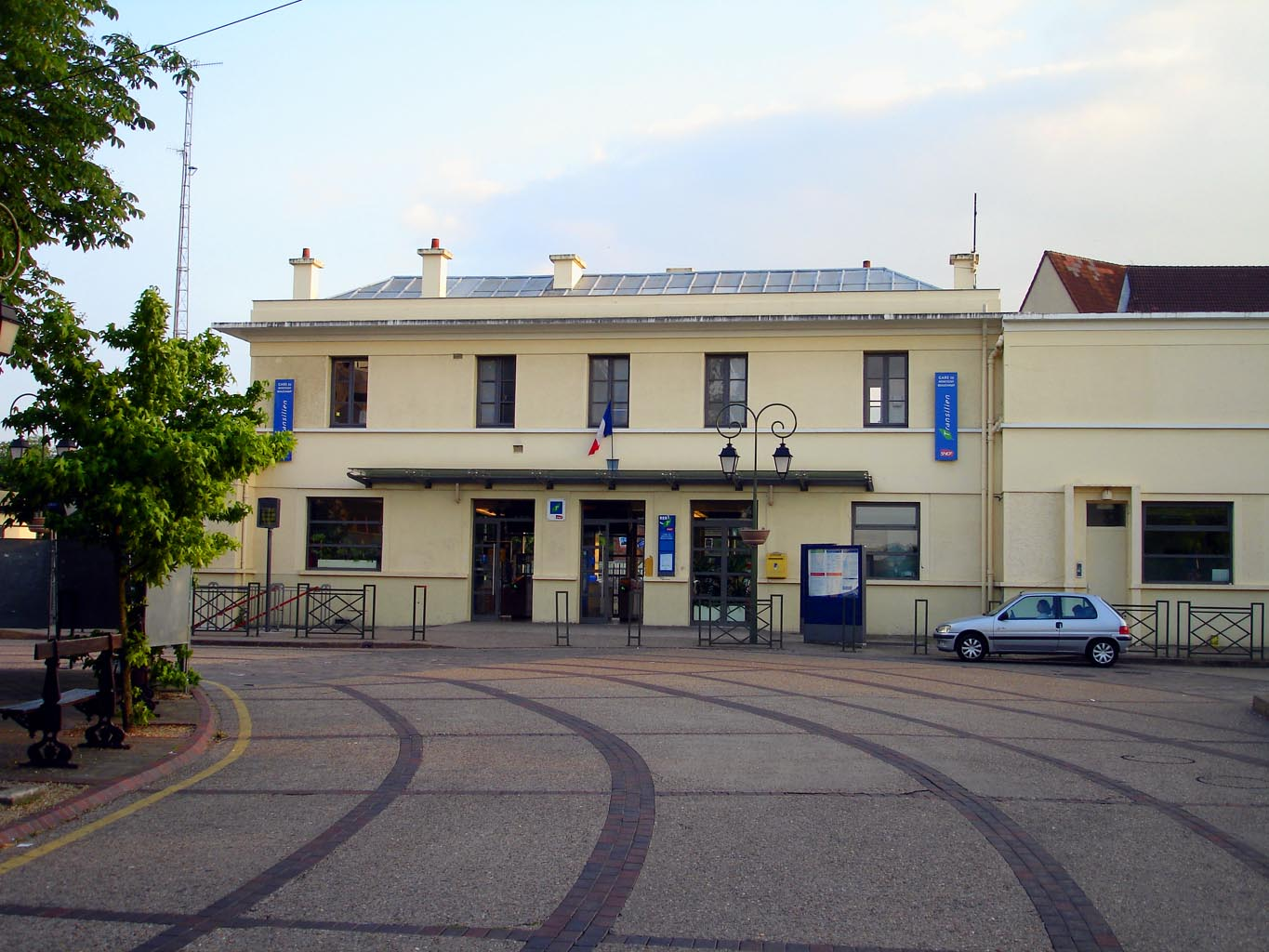
Entrance

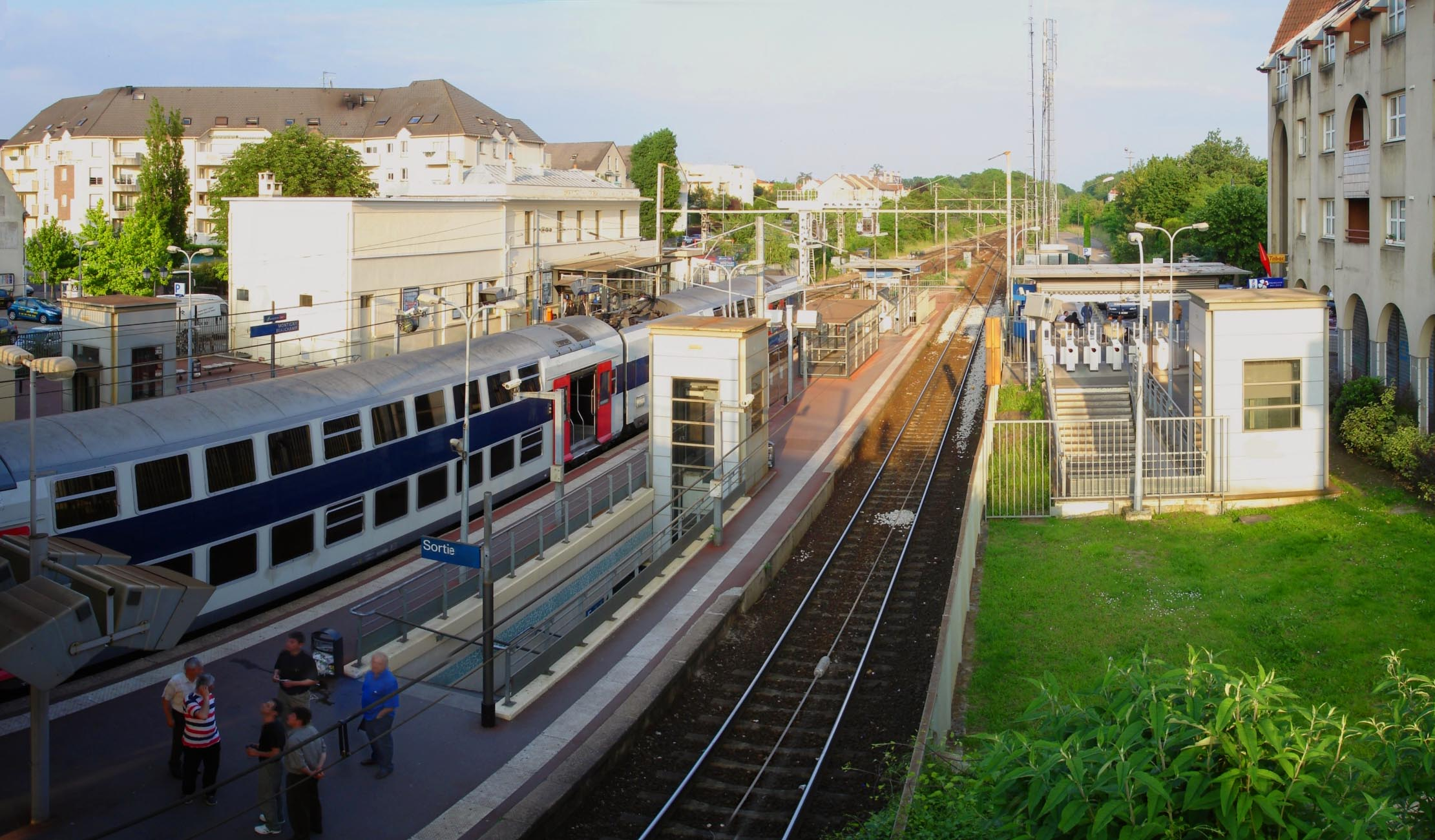
The station and the tracks toward Ermont

Montigny–Beauchamp (French pronunciation: [mɔ̃tiɲi boʃɑ̃]) is a station between Montigny-lès-Cormeilles and Beauchamp, in the northwestern suburbs of Paris. It is served by Transilien regional trains from Paris to Pontoise, and by RER rapid transit.

== See also ==
- List of stations of the Paris RER

Preceding station	Transilien	Following station
Franconville – Le Plessis-Bouchard towards Paris-Nord	Line H	Pierrelaye towards Pontoise
Preceding station	RER	Following station
Pierrelaye towards Pontoise	RER C	Franconville – Le Plessis-Bouchard towards Massy-Palaiseau, Dourdan-la-Forêt or Saint-Martin-d'Étampes
