= RER C =

Hybrid suburban commuter railway line in Paris, France

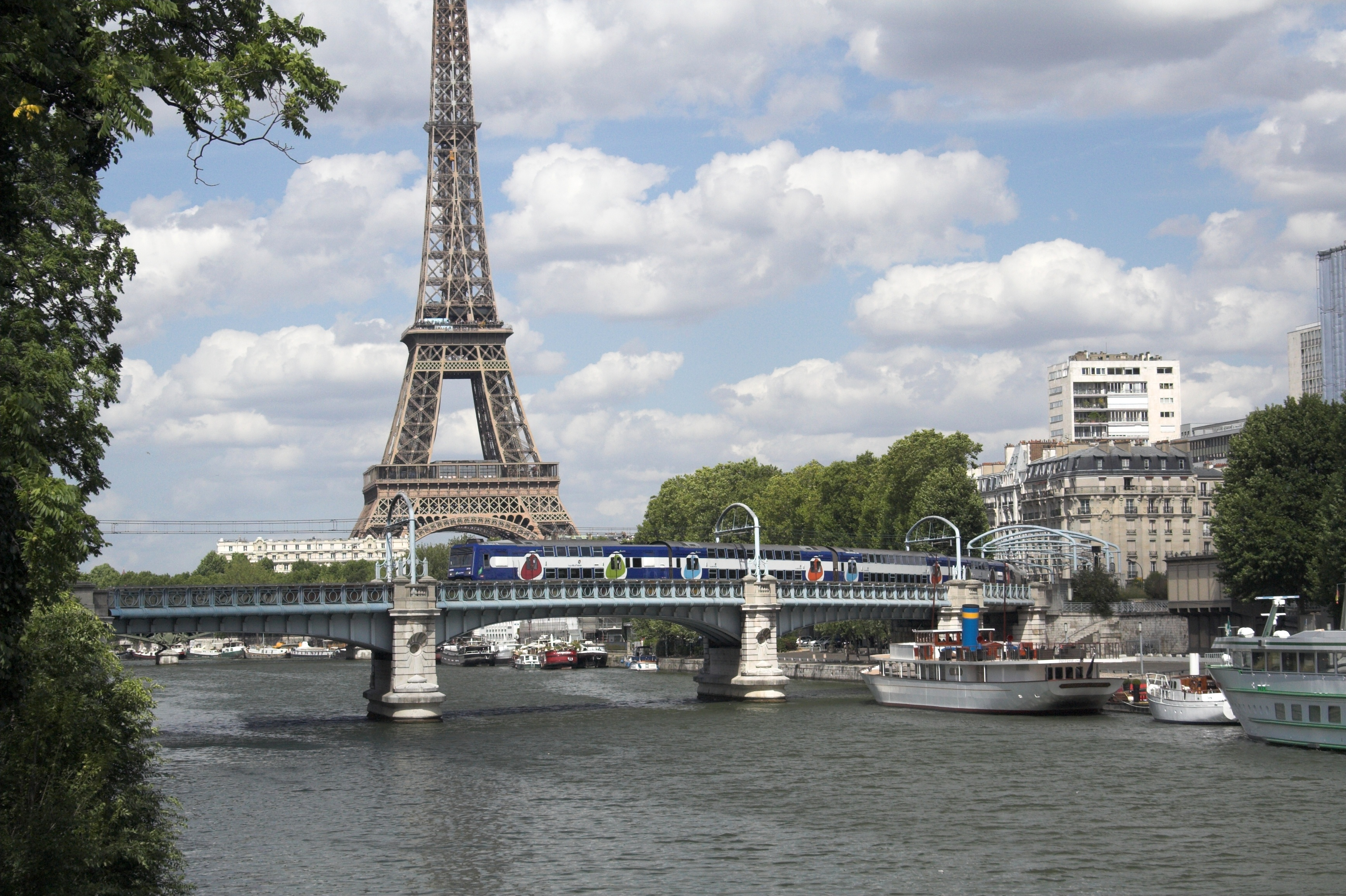
- RER C train crossing the Pont Rouelle, with the Eiffel Tower in the background, as seen from Île aux Cygnes

Overview
- Termini: Pontoise (C1); Versailles Château Rive Gauche (C5); Saint-Quentin-en-Yvelines (C7); Massy–Palaiseau (C2); Dourdan-la-Forêt (C4); Saint-Martin-d'Étampes (C6)
- Connecting lines: Paris Metro Paris Metro Line 1 Paris Metro Line 2 Paris Metro Line 3 Paris Metro Line 4 Paris Metro Line 5 Paris Metro Line 6 Paris Metro Line 7 Paris Metro Line 8 Paris Metro Line 9 Paris Metro Line 10 Paris Metro Line 12 Paris Metro Line 13 Paris Metro Line 14 RER RER B RER D RER E Transilien Transilien Line H (Paris-Nord) Transilien Line J (Paris-Saint-Lazare) Transilien Line N (Paris-Montparnasse) Transilien Line U Transilien Line V Tramways in Île-de-France Île-de-France tramway Line 1 Île-de-France tramway Line 2 Île-de-France tramway Line 3a Île-de-France tramway Line 3b Île-de-France tramway Line 6 Île-de-France tramway Line 7 Île-de-France tramway Line 8 Île-de-France tramway Line 9 Île-de-France tramway Line 11 Île-de-France tramway Line 12
- Stations: 75

Service
- Type: Rapid transit/commuter rail
- System: Réseau Express Régional
- Operator: SNCF
- Rolling stock: Z 5600, Z 8800, Z 20500, Z 20900
- Ridership: 140 million journeys per year

History
- Opened: 26 September 1979; 47 years ago
- Last extension: 2006

Technical
- Line length: 185.6 km (115.3 mi)
- Track gauge: 1,435 mm (4 ft 8 1/2 in) standard gauge
- Electrification: Overhead line: 25 kV 50 Hz AC; 1,500 V DC
Route map

RER C is one of the five lines in the Réseau Express Régional (Regional Express Network), a hybrid commuter rail and rapid transit system serving Paris and its suburbs. The 186-kilometre (116 mi) line crosses the region from north to south. Briefly, between September 1979 and May 1980, the line was known as the Transversal Rive Gauche. The line is operated by SNCF.

The line runs from the northern termini Pontoise (C1), Versailles Château Rive Gauche (C5) and Saint-Quentin-en-Yvelines (C7) to the southern termini Massy–Palaiseau (C2), Dourdan-la-Forêt (C4) and Saint-Martin-d'Étampes (C6).

The RER C line is the second-longest in the network, created from an amalgamation and renovation of several old SNCF commuter lines, unlike RER A and B which had newer sections owned and constructed by RATP. Each day, over 531 trains run on the RER C alone, and carries over 540,000 passengers daily, 150,000 passengers more than the entirety of the TGV network.

It is the most popular RER line for tourists, who represent 15% of its passengers, as the line serves many monuments and museums, including the Palace of Versailles. However, the numerous stops, combined with the old and fragile infrastructure the line inherited, makes the Parisian section of the RER C slow and inefficient. The numerous old curves and steep grades on RER C mean trains sometimes need to slow down to 30 km/h (20 mph) to safely pass sections with tight alignments. In contrast, RER A was constructed to more modern standards enabling much higher average operating speeds. These problems are particularly evident on trips to and from the northern suburbs to the city center as taking Transilien lines and transferring to the Paris Metro can be faster than taking the RER C with its closely spaced stops. In addition, the RER C's complicated operating schedule created by its complex network of numerous branches means the entire line is vulnerable to delays from even small incidents.

== History ==
Line C was opened on 26 September 1979, following the construction of a new 1-kilometre (5/8 mi) tunnel connecting the Gare d'Orsay railway terminus (now Musée d'Orsay) with the Invalides, terminus of the Rive Gauche line to Versailles, along the banks of the Seine. Services operated between Versailles Château Rive Gauche – Invalides – Quai-d'Orsay, branching to Massy–Palaiseau, and Juvisy – Dourdan / Saint-Martin-d'Étampes. At that point the line was named the Transversal Rive Gauche.

In May 1980, service was extended to Saint-Quentin-en-Yvelines – Versailles Chantiers – Gare des Invalides. The RER C designation was then introduced, replacing the Transversal Rive Gauche name from this point onwards.

On 25 September 1988, the VMI ("Vallée de Montmorency – Invalides") branch to the north-west opened. This branch mostly used the infrastructure of the "ligne d'Auteuil" (incorporated into the "ligne de petite ceinture" from 1867, closed to passengers from 22 July 1934), and a new 3-kilometre (2 mi) tunnel connection between Batignolles and Saint-Ouen, connecting to the RER C's main trunk at Champ de Mars–Tour Eiffel via a curved bridge (the only one in Paris) over the Seine river. That extended services to Montigny–Beauchamp and Argenteuil.

The station Porte de Clichy, located between Pereire–Levallois and Saint-Ouen, opened on 29 September 1991. In 1992, the line was extended from Juvisy to Versailles. A further 9 kilometres (5 5/8 mi) extension from Montigny–Beauchamp to Pontoise was opened on 28 August 2000. On the same day a new station, Bibliothèque François Mitterrand, opened in order to create a new interchange with Metro Line 14, located between Paris-Austerlitz and Boulevard Masséna, which was closed and replaced by the new station. Another new station, Saint-Ouen-l'Aumône-Liesse, opened on 24 March 2002.

On 27 August 2006, the C3 service (between Ermont–Eaubonne and Argenteuil) was transferred to the Transilien Paris-Saint-Lazare suburban rail network as Line J.

On 16 December 2006, Boulevard Victor was renamed Boulevard Victor–Pont du Garigliano to highlight the new interchange with tramway line T3 (T3a since 15 December 2012).

In February 2012, the Versailles Rive Gauche station was renamed Versailles Château Rive Gauche, to highlight its proximity to the Palace of Versailles, and to avoid confusion with other stations in Versailles served by RER C.

In December 2023, the C8 branch was withdrawn. The new Transilien Line V began a shuttle service between Versailles-Chantiers and Massy-Palaiseau. The line between Savigny-sur-Orge and Massy-Palaiseau became tram-train line T12 Express.

== Services ==
Schematic plan of the line as of 10 December 2023

Like all other RER lines in Paris, the mission code, or the name of service, consists of four letters. The names of services are displayed on trains and on passenger information display systems. The four-letter code begins with a letter that corresponds to the train's terminus. For example, trains displaying NORA terminate at Pontoise because NORA starts with the letter 'N' (and codes that start with the letter 'N' indicate the destination of Pontoise).

Several services had the code name changed in 2015, for example KUMA to KYVI.

Letter	Destination	Codes
A	Austerlitz	ANNE
B	Bretigny	BALI
C	Versailles Chantiers	CARO, CIME, CITY
D	Dourdan or Dourdan-la-Forêt	DEBA, DEBO, DYVI
E	Saint-Martin-d'Étampes	ELAO, ELBA
F	Bibliothèque François Mitterrand	FOOT
G	Montigny–Beauchamp	GATA, GOTA, GUTA
J	Juvisy	JILL, JOEL
K	Chaville–Vélizy	KAMA, KUMA, KYVI
L	Invalides	LARA, LOLA, LURA
M	Massy–Palaiseau	MONA
N	Pontoise	NARA, NORA
O	Musée d'Orsay	ORDO, ORET, ORSE, ORSU
P	Pont du Garigliano	PAUL, PUMA
R	Pont de Rungis–Aéroport d'Orly	ROMI
S	Saint-Quentin-en-Yvelines–Montigny-le-Bretonneux	SARA, SLIM, SLOM
V	Versailles Château Rive Gauche	VERO, VICK, VITY, VURT
Y	Dourdan or Étampes	YACK, YETI, YONA

== Future ==
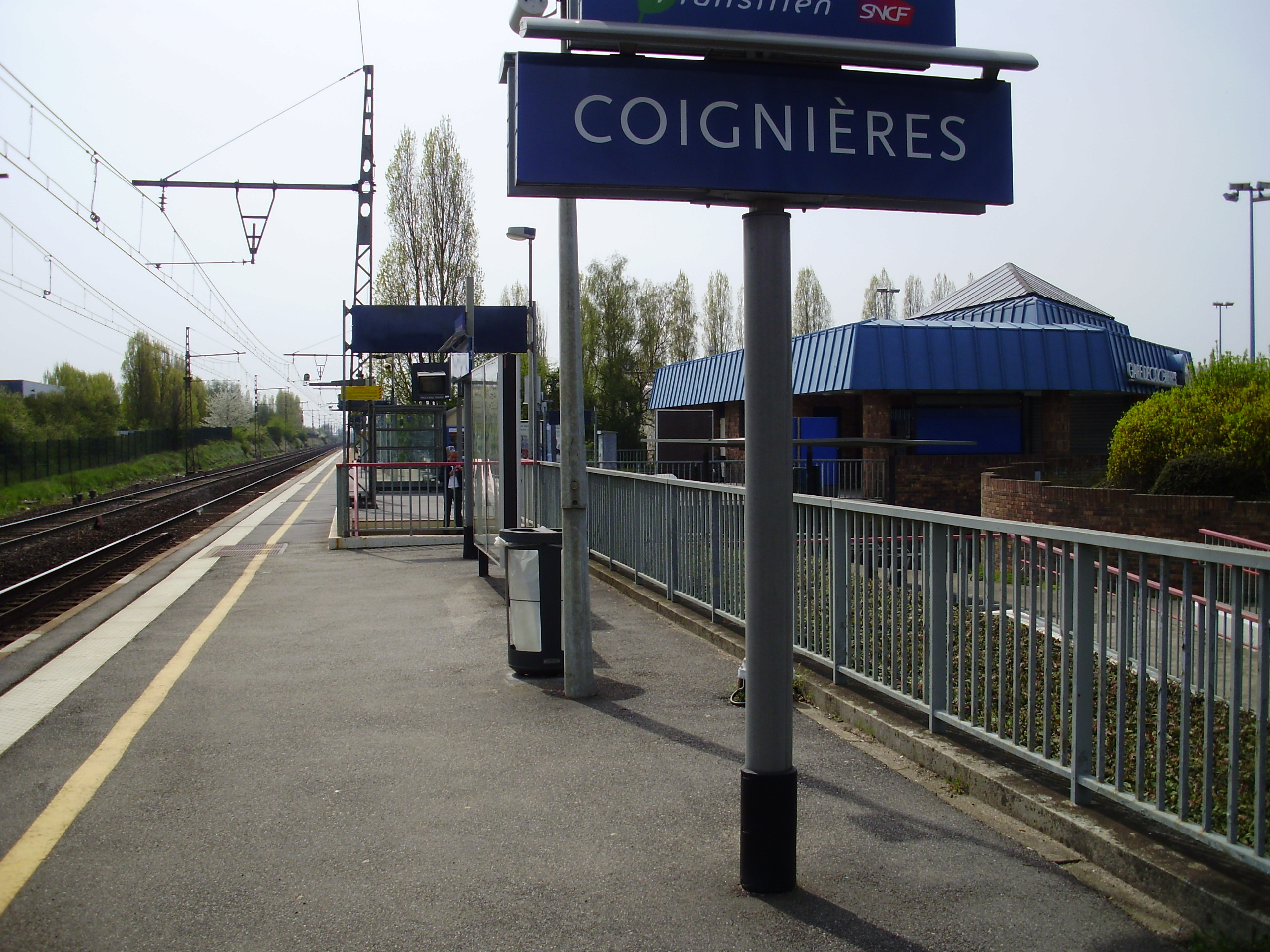
Coignières station in April 2010

The extension of the Saint-Quentin-en-Yvelines branch to Coignières station, with intermediate stops at Trappes and La Verrière, was included in Phase 1 (2013–2020) of the Schéma directeur de la région Île-de-France (SDRIF) adopted by the Regional Council of Île-de-France on September 25, 2008. However, this vital project to serve the Saint-Quentin-en-Yvelines conurbation (improved service to La Verrière and Trappes stations, and control of (high) ridership at Saint-Quentin-en-Yvelines – Montigny-le-Bretonneux station) has been delayed due to the high infrastructure costs involved, estimated at over €120 million at June 2008 economic conditions. The project requires work to be carried out on the line to make the Trappes crossing safer. The project is now expected to be completed around 2030.
