= Versailles Château Rive Gauche station =

Railroad station in Versailles, France

Versailles Château Rive Gauche
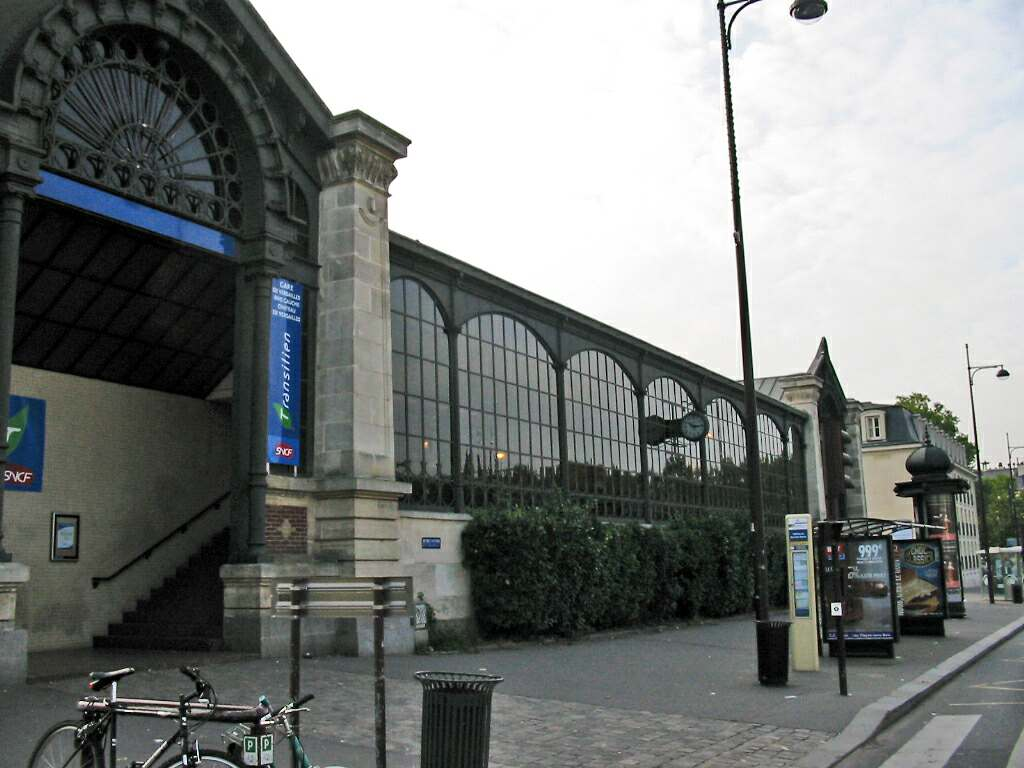
- Versailles Château Rive Gauche station entrance

General information
- Location: 5 Avenue du Général de Gaulle; Versailles; France
- Coordinates: 48°48′0″N 2°7′45″E
- Operator: SNCF
- Platforms: 2 island platforms, 1 side platform
- Tracks: 5 + 1 siding
- Connections: Grand Versailles: 6201, 6203, 6204, 6210, 6211, 6213, 6240, 6287; Île-de-France Ouest: 5146; Saint-Quentin-en-Yvelines: 5102, 5134, 5140, 5141; Saint-Germain Boucles de Seine: 1; Vélizy Vallées: 6122, 6161, 6162, 6163, 6173, 6182, 6185; Noctilien: N145

Construction
- Structure type: At-grade
- Accessible: Yes, by prior reservation

Other information
- Station code: 87393157
- Fare zone: 4

History
- Opened: 10 September 1840

Passengers
- 2024: 6,800,688

Services
Preceding station	RER	Following station
Terminus	RER C	Porchefontaine towards Juvisy
Location

Versailles Château Rive Gauche station (French pronunciation: [vɛʁsɑj ʃɑto ʁiv ɡoʃ]) is a terminal railway station serving the city of Versailles, a wealthy suburb located west of Paris, France. The station is the closest to the Palace of Versailles (French: Château de Versailles). The station is located at the western end of the Rive Gauche (lit. 'Left Bank') railway, named because it operates on the left bank of the Seine.

The station is operated by SNCF, the French national railway. It is served by RER C line of the Paris Region's express suburban rail system, the Réseau Express Régional.

In February 2012, "Château" was added to the station name to help navigate tourists to the station closest to the Palace of Versailles.

The station is one of several in Versailles, but sees fewer trains than Versailles Chantiers station.

== Gallery ==
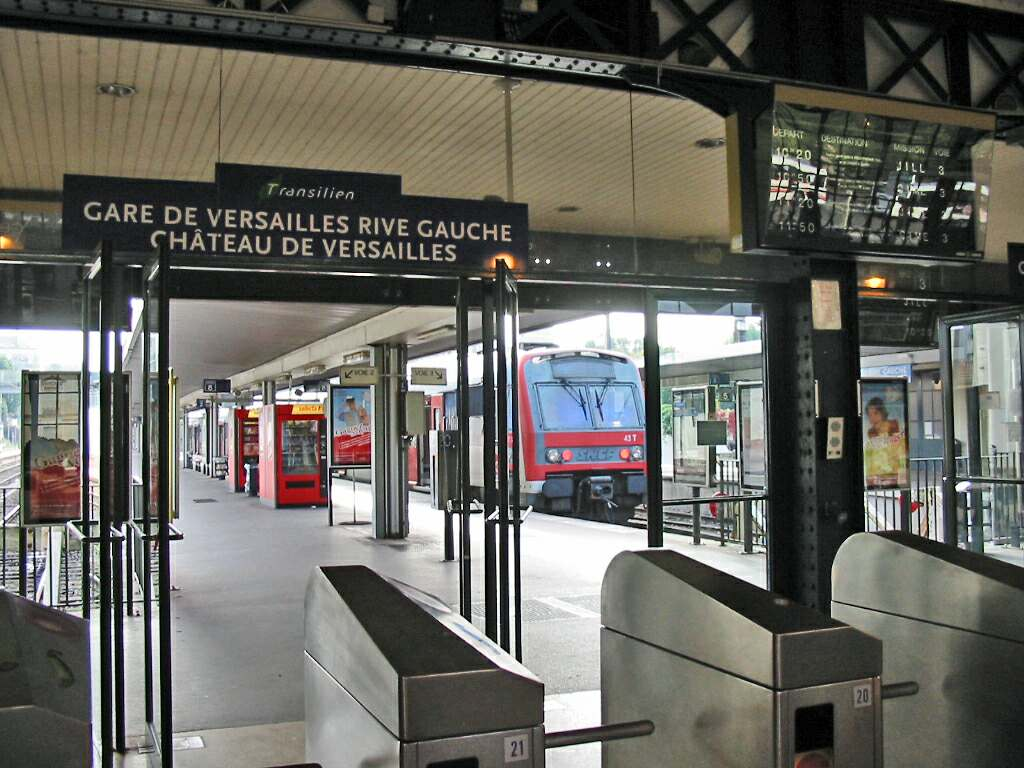
The platforms

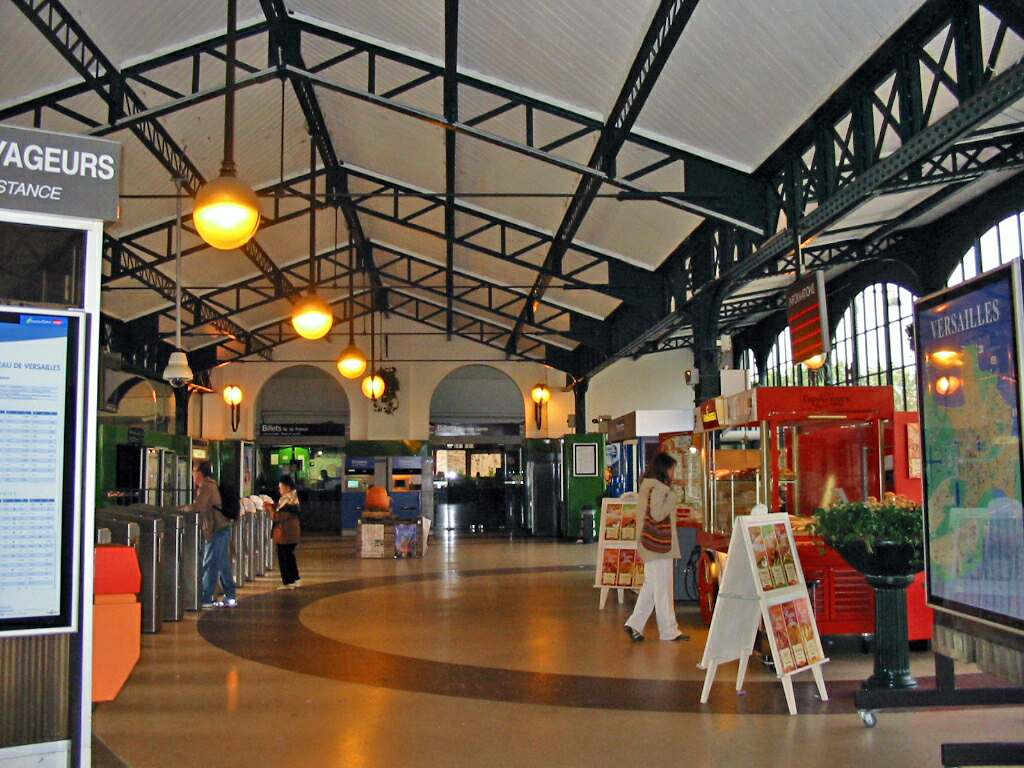
The hall

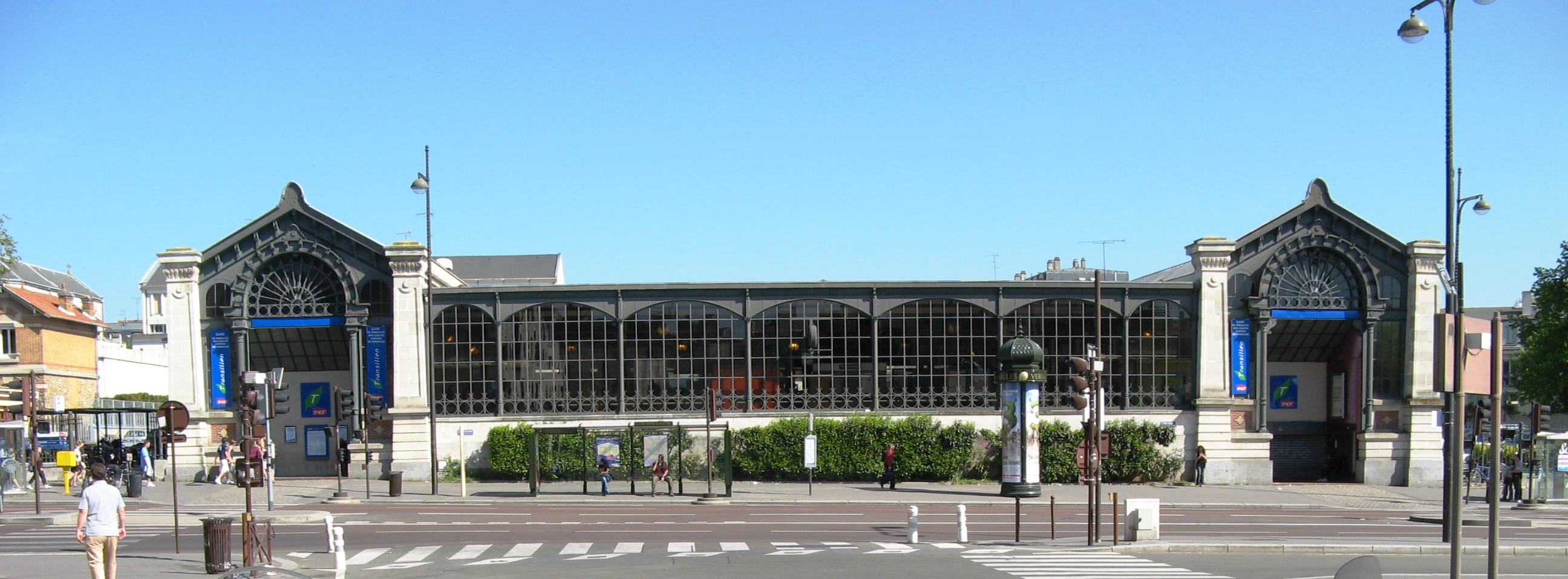
The façade

== See also ==
- Other train stations in Versailles:
  - Versailles Chantiers station (main station)
  - Versailles Rive Droite station
  - Montreuil station
  - Porchefontaine station
