= Dourdan-la-Forêt station =

Railway station in Dourdan, France

Dourdan-la-Forêt

General information
- Location: France
- Coordinates: 48°32′07″N 1°59′41″E
- System: Ground
- Operator: SNCF (Transilien)
- Connections: Transilien

Other information
- Status: In use
Location

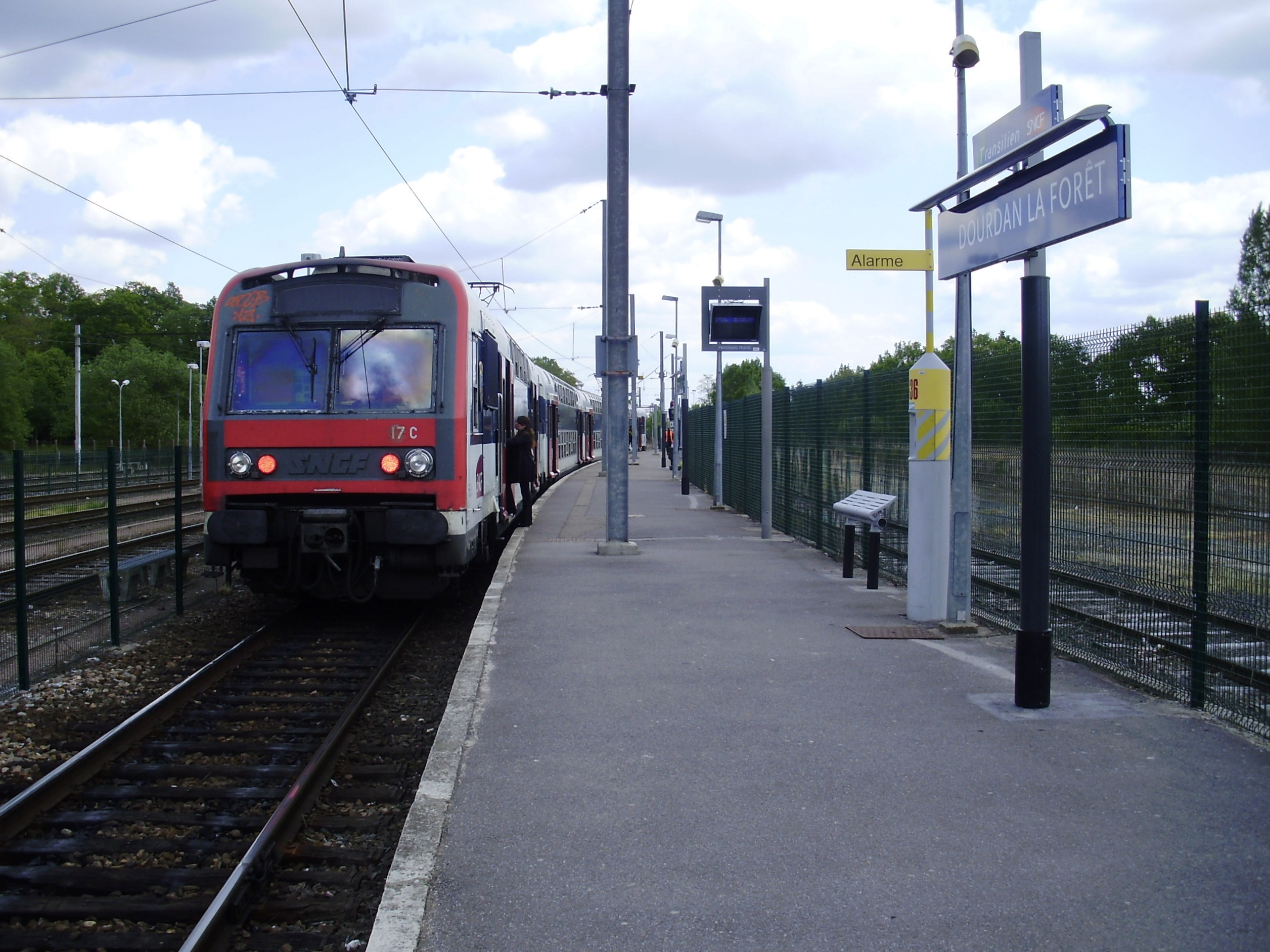
Platform

Dourdan-la-Forêt (French pronunciation: [duʁdɑ̃ la fɔʁɛ]) is a train station in Dourdan near Paris. It is served by Paris' express suburban rail system, the RER.

== See also ==
- List of stations of the Paris RER

Preceding station	RER	Following station
Dourdan towards Pontoise, Versailles Château Rive Gauche or Saint-Quentin-en-Yvelines	RER C	Terminus
