= Saint-Quentin-en-Yvelines–Montigny-le-Bretonneux station =

Railway station in Montigny-le-Bretonneux, France

Saint-Quentin-en-Yvelines–Montigny-le-Bretonneux
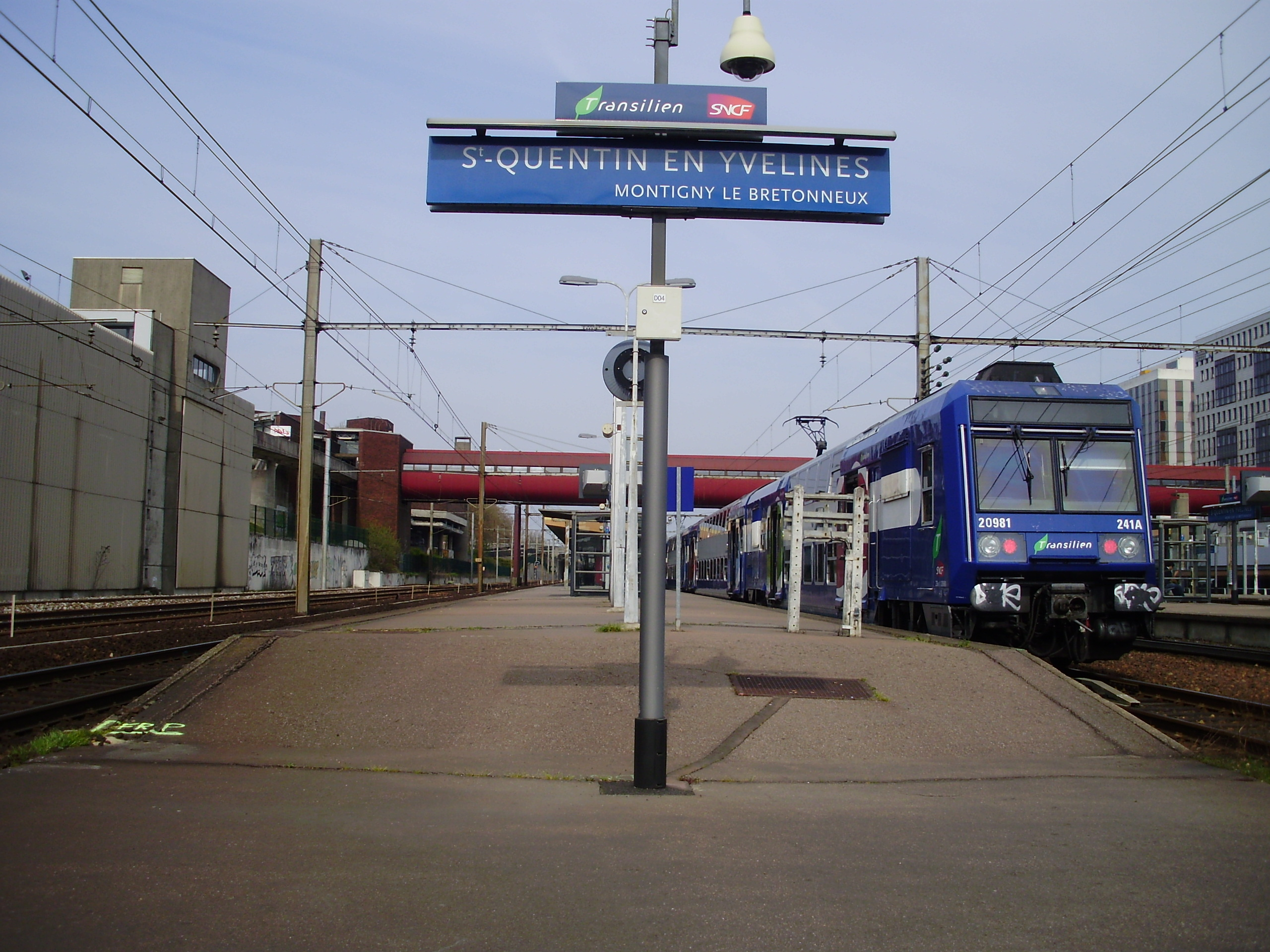

General information
- Location: Montigny-le-Bretonneux, Yvelines, Île-de-France, France
- Coordinates: 48°47′14″N 2°02′40″E
- Line: Paris–Brest railway RER C

Other information
- Station code: 87393843

Passengers
- 2024: 12,011,294

Services
Preceding station	RER	Following station
Terminus	RER C	Saint-Cyr towards Saint-Martin-d'Étampes
Preceding station	Transilien	Following station
Trappes towards Rambouillet	Line N	Saint-Cyr towards Paris–Montparnasse
Trappes towards La Verrière	Line U	Saint-Cyr towards La Défense
Location

Saint-Quentin-en-Yvelines–Montigny-le-Bretonneux (French pronunciation: [sɛ̃ kɑ̃tɛ̃ ɑ̃.n‿ivlin mɔ̃tiɲi lə bʁətɔnø]) is a station on the Paris–Brest railway. It is served by Paris's express suburban rail system, the RER Line C and by suburban Transilien Line N and U services. The station opened in 1975. It is within Montigny-le-Bretonneux.

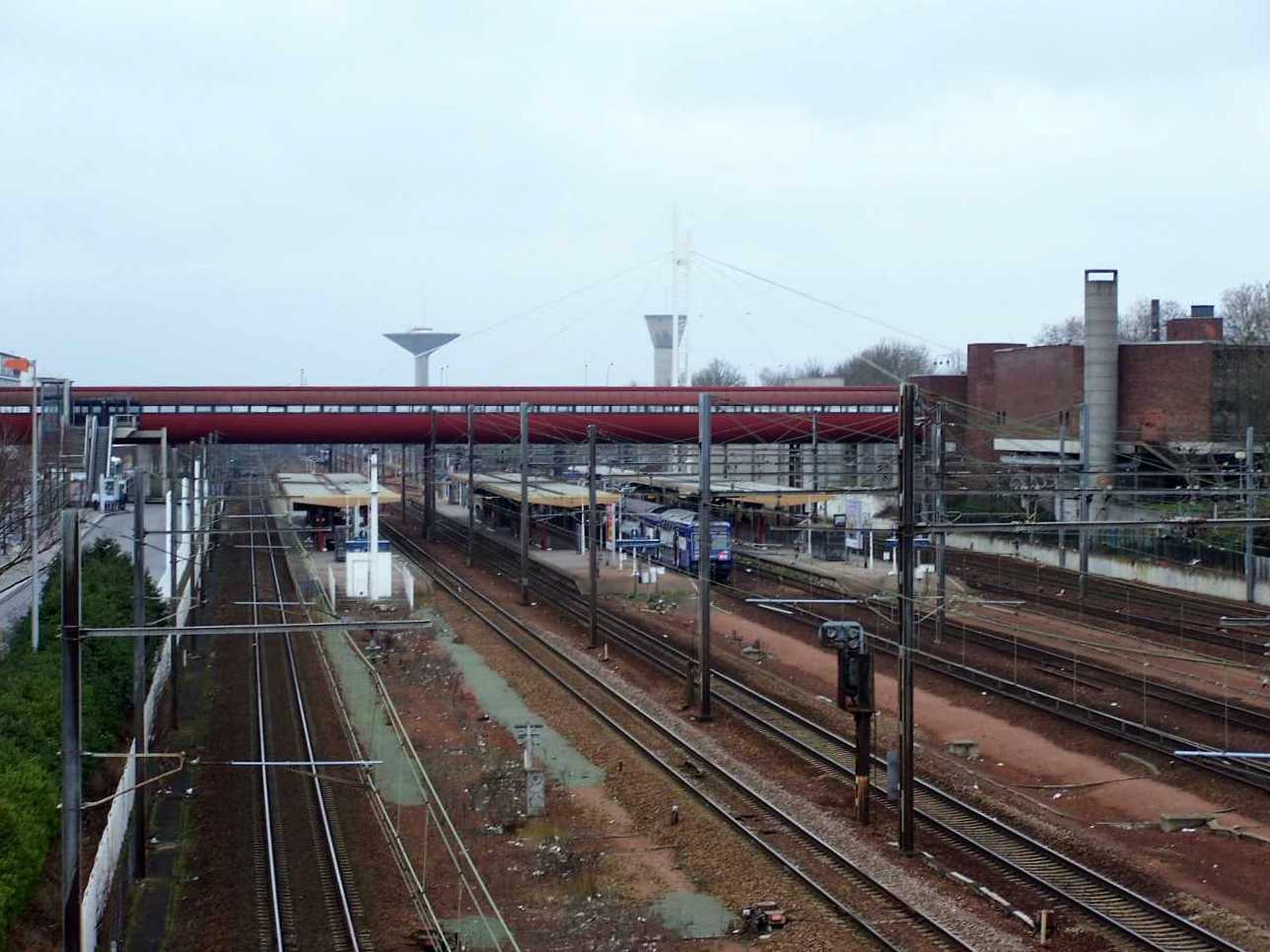

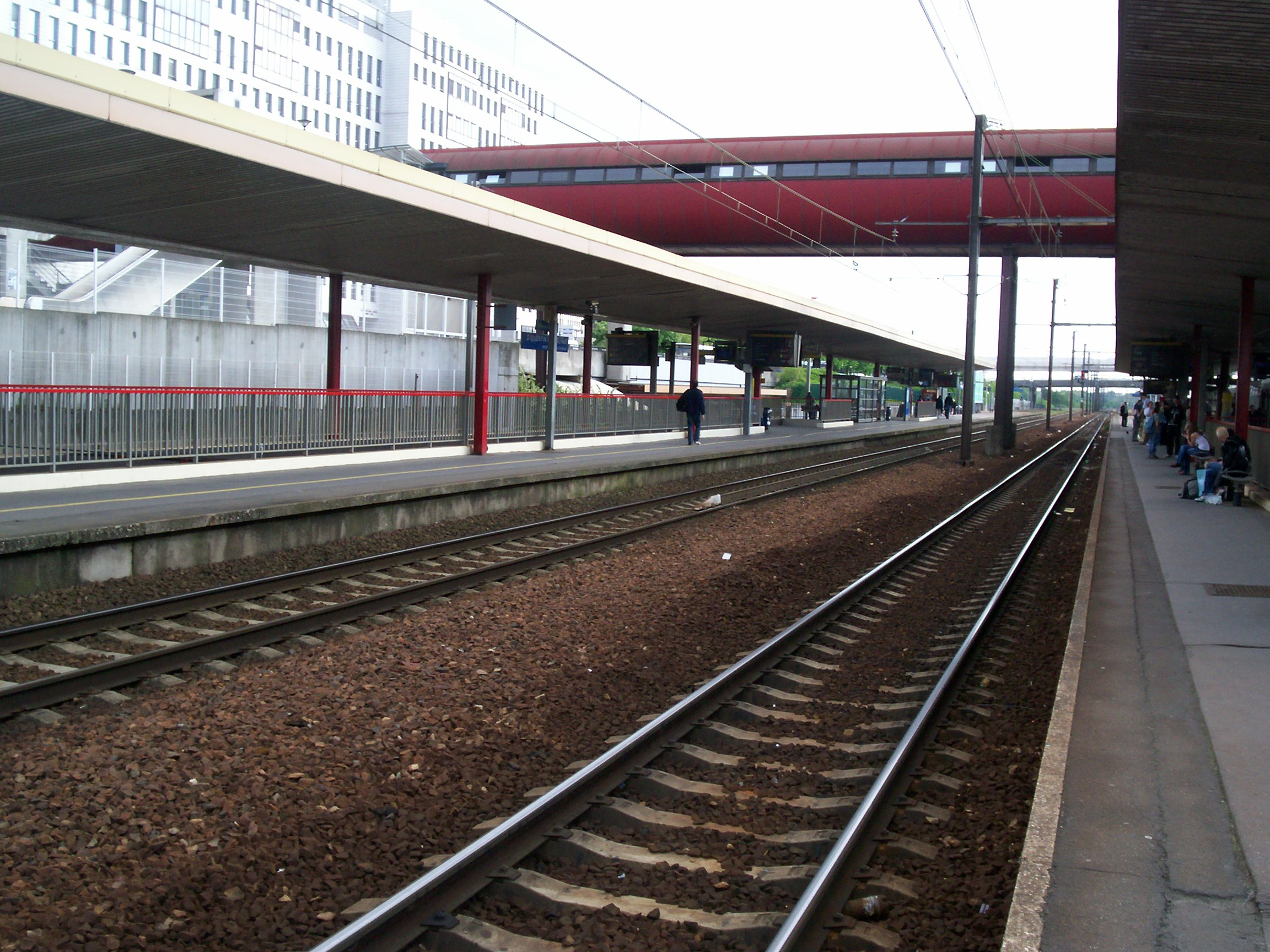

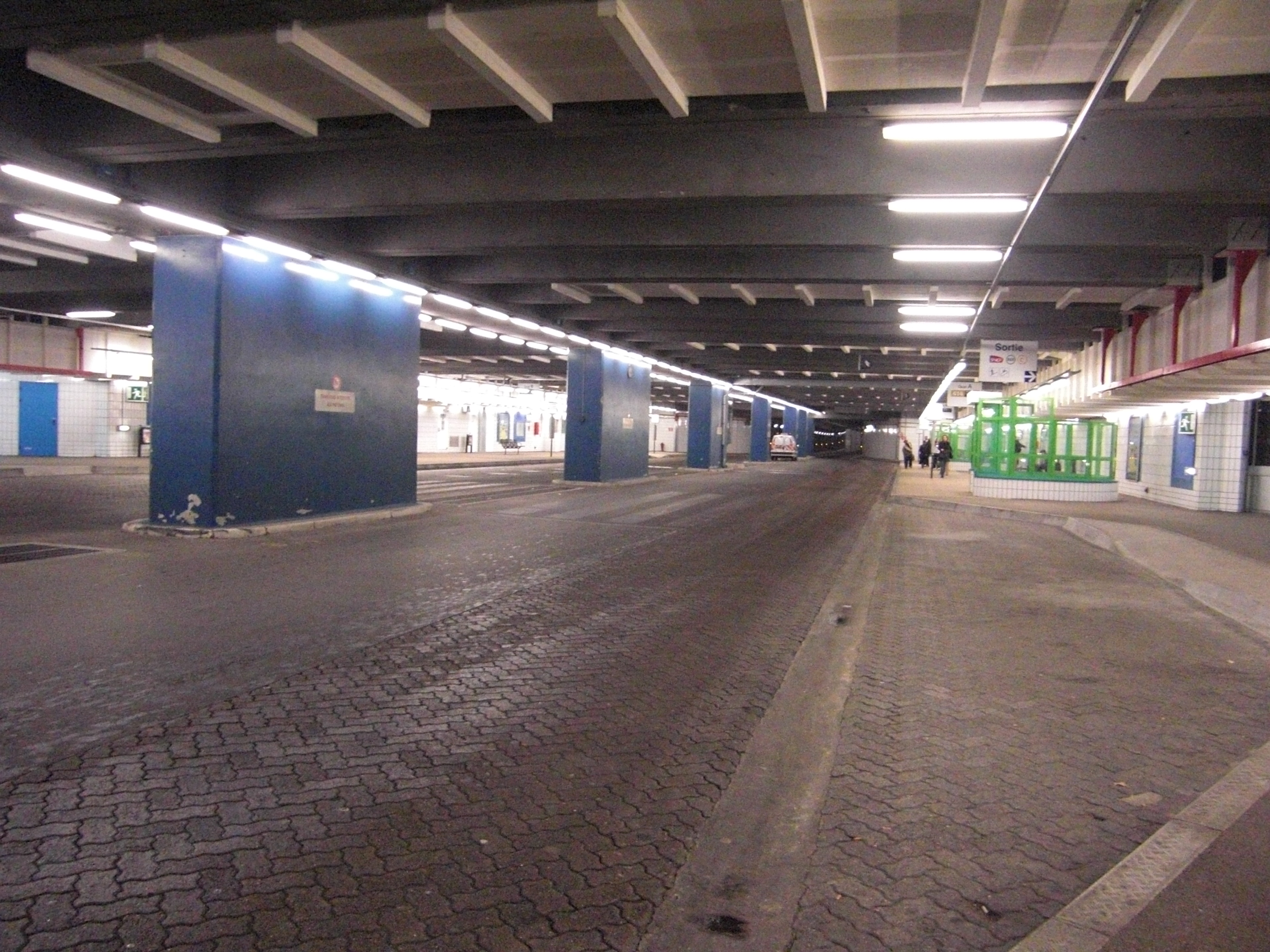
Bus interchange

== See also ==
- List of stations of the Paris RER
