= Saint-Martin-d'Étampes station =

Railway station in Étampes, France

Saint-Martin-d'Étampes
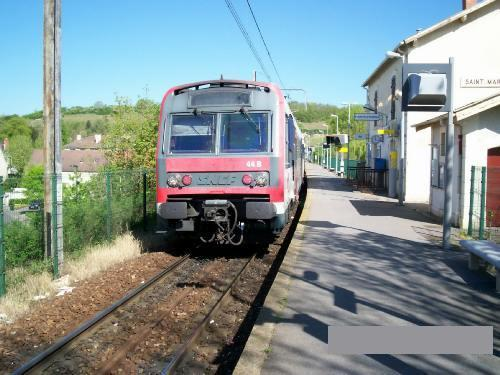
- Saint-Martin d'Étampes railway station

General information
- Location: Étampes, Essonne, Île-de-France, France
- Coordinates: 48°25′39″N 2°08′43″E
- Line: Étampes-Beaune-la-Rolande railway
- Platforms: 1
- Tracks: 1

Other information
- Station code: 87545350
- Fare zone: 5

History
- Opened: 27 September 1970
Location

Saint-Martin-d'Étampes (French pronunciation: [sɛ̃ maʁtɛ̃ detɑ̃p]) is a railway station in Étampes, Essonne, in the southern suburbs of Paris, France. The station was opened in 1970 and is on the Étampes–Beaune-la-Rolande railway. The station is served by Paris' express suburban rail system, the RER. The train services are operated by SNCF.

The line beyond the station was closed in 1969. The RER service was launched here in 1979. It was necessary to build this station, as trains could not terminate at Étampes without causing disruption to the Paris–Bordeaux railway.

== Train services ==
The following services serve the station:

- Local services (RER C) Saint-Martin d'Étampes–Juvisy–Paris–Issy–Versailles-Chantiers–Saint-Quentin-en-Yvelines

== See also ==
- List of stations of the Paris RER

| Preceding station | RER | Following station |
|---|---|---|
| Étampes towards Saint-Quentin-en-Yvelines | RER C | Terminus |
