= Economy of the Republic of Artsakh =

Economy of Artsakh
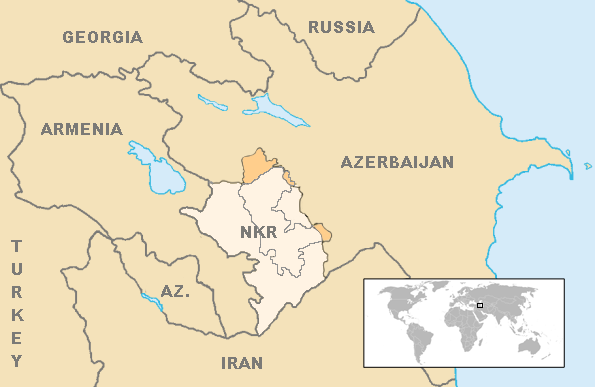
- Currency: 1 Dram = 100 louma
- Fiscal year: Calendar year

Statistics
- GDP: $716.8 million (2019 est.)
- GDP growth: 9% (2019 )
- GDP per capita: $4,779 (2019 est.)
- GDP by sector: services (57%), manufacturing industry (15%), construction (9%), agriculture (16%) (2007 est.)
- Labour force: 64,987 total (2013), 62,420 employed, 2,567 unemployed (2013 est)
- Unemployment: 4.0% (2013 est.)
- Main industries: tourism, agriculture, animal husbandry, gold mining, copper mining, electricity production, construction, road construction, diamond-processing, telecommunications, knitted wear, distillery, banking

External
- Exports: $202,050 (2018)
- Export goods: Foodstuffs, tourism, watchmaker, alcohol, electricity
- Main export partners: Armenia
- Imports: $353,007 (2018)
- Main import partners: Armenia

Public finance
- Spending: $186 million (2016)
- Economic aid: $38 million (2009)
- All values, unless otherwise stated, are in US dollars.

The economy of the Republic of Artsakh was a post-soviet free market, experiencing an economic depression during the 1990s (following the dissolution of the Soviet Union) but then a rapid growth after 2001 until the COVID-19 pandemic.

The economy of Karabakh showed a relatively quick and confident recovery from the 1991-1994 war. In 1999, the GDP figure was $59 million, 80 percent down on the figure in Soviet times. Yet, the GDP of the Republic of Artsakh reached $114 million in 2005, double the figure in 2001, registering economic growth of 14% (in current prices) in 2005, and in 2009 it registered a GDP of $260 million, which increased to $320 million by 2010. Nagorno-Karabakh's GDP (PPP) for 2010 was estimated at $1.6 billion.

According to official estimates of the Nagorno-Karabakh Statistical Service, the GDP in current (market) prices increased by 116% between 2001 and 2007. The Consumer Price Index increased only by 34% during this period, which implies a real growth of about 60% in GDP during the six years 2001–2007. In 2007, agriculture accounted for 16% of GDP, manufacturing industries 15%, construction 9%, and the service sector 57%. The share of agriculture in GDP went down from 33% in 2002 to 16% in 2007, while the share of manufacturing and services increased correspondingly.

Most investments were in telecoms, gold mining, diamond polishing, jewelry and agriculture. In the Soviet Union, Nagorno-Karabakh was the largest per capita producer of grapes. The territory's major newspaper and publishing company was Azat Artsakh, which was founded in Stepanakert in 1923.

Nagorno-Karabakh is known for its mulberry vodka (Armenian: tuti oghi), commercially produced and exported under the brand name Artsakh by the Artsakh-Alco Brandy Company in Askeran District.

== Energy ==
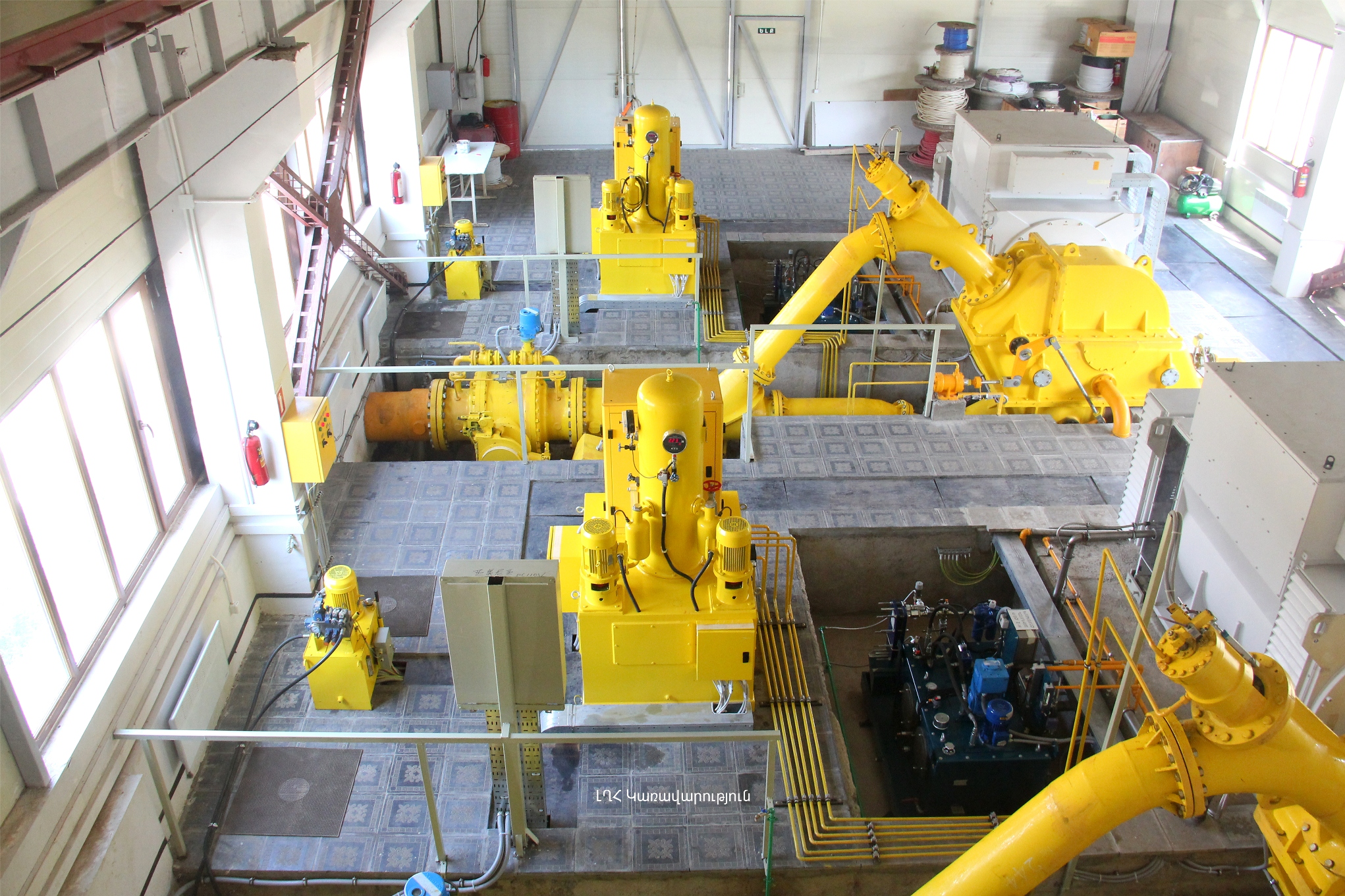
Trghi-1 hydroelectric power station

Up until recently Nagorno-Karabakh Republic was known to operate at least one hydroelectric power plant near Mardakert, which was constructed during the Soviet times. The government hoped to build a number of small hydroelectric power plants — at a cost of $70–$80 million — that would supply both domestic needs and provide opportunities for export. In 2001 the republic imported 60 percent of its electricity from Armenia.

On 12 April 2010 the prime ministers of NKR and Armenia inaugurated "Trghe-1" - the first in series of long anticipated hydro-electric stations in Nagorno-Karabakh. The name of the new electric energy company was "Artsakh HEK”, which already had a base capital of $5mln on the day of its inauguration. Prime Minister of Armenia, Tigran Sargsyan called on the public and the diaspora to buy the shares of "Artsakh HEPS" and to invest in NKR economy, saying that its security and future relies on its economic growth and economic self-sufficiency. Plans included the construction of two more mini-hydro-electric power stations on the same river – “Trghe-2 and “Trghe-3” by the end of 2010 and also “Mataghis-1” and “Mataghis-2” in 2011. The realization of the given energetic program would give the chance to produce additional 120 million kwt/h of the electric power. By 2012 this would almost completely satisfy the requirements of the republic for the electric power, which would rise by then to 300 million kwt/h.

With these new power plants NKR hoped to become not only self-sufficient in terms of its electricity production, but also a net exporter of electric energy.

== Road construction and infrastructure ==
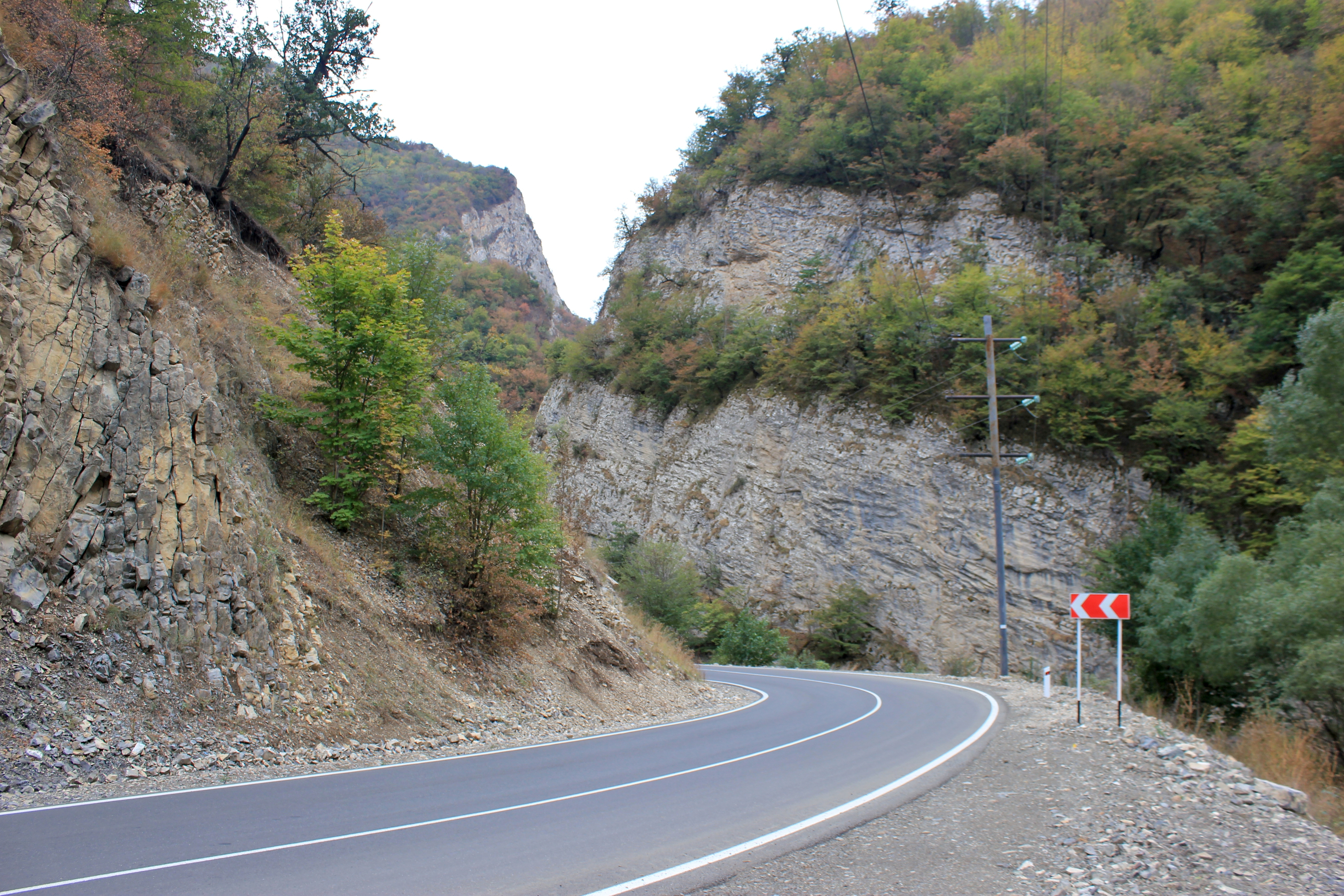
Vardenis-Martakert Highway

One of Nagorno-Karabakh's most eye-catching pieces of infrastructure is the $15 million Goris-Stepanakert road, built right after the 1991-1994 war ended by funding from the Armenian diaspora. This road through the Lachin corridor is the only one that connects the region with Armenia and the rest of the world.

Now the construction of the 168 km "North-South" highway at a cost of only $25 million, which connects Mardakert with Stepanakert and Martuni is completed.

In recent years a Lebanese-funded phone operator company "Karabakh Telecom" was launched. Total profit from communication services has increased 12.8 percent since 2008. The telecommunications sector was developed with Karabakh Telecom investing millions of dollars in mobile telephony, spearheaded by a Lebanese company.

The region had an inactive airline called Artsakh Air based in Stepanakert Airport and founded in 2011. The airline never operated any flights.

== Banking ==
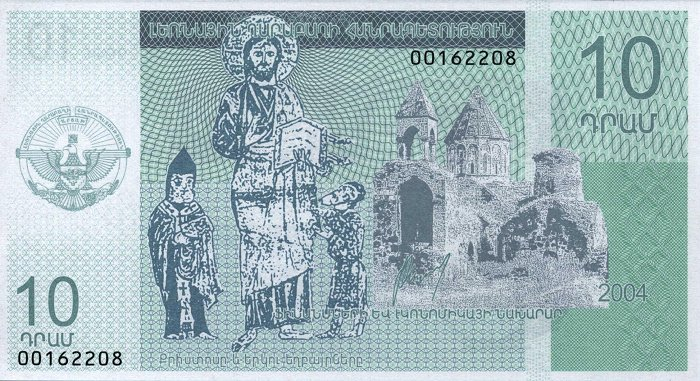
10 Dram banknote from 2004

ArtsakhBank has been operational since 1996 and has branches in Stepanakert and throughout various locations in Nagorno-Karabakh. It employs 243 people. Some of the leading Armenian banks also have branches in Nagorno Karabakh.

The sector is growing dynamically. As of September 1, 2010, the volume of deposits made AMD 38,664.1 mln. (~USD 107 mln.), which is 33.1% more, as compared to the level of January 1, 2010. As compared to January 1, 2010, the volume of credits issued by commercial banks increased by 28.3%.

The banking system is administered by Artsakhbank (the state bank) and a number of Armenian banks. The republic primarily uses the Armenian dram, while the Artsakh dram is also considered legal tender.

== Mining ==
Nagorno-Karabakh is rich in natural resources of precious and semi-precious metals, such as gold and copper and other natural resources.

Copper and gold mining has been advancing since 2002 with development and launch of operations at Drmbon deposit. Approximately 27-28 thousand tons (wet weight) of concentrates are produced with average copper content of 19-21% and gold content of 35-55 g/t. The mine is one of the biggest taxpayers of Nagorno-Karabakh and employs 1200 workers of which 65% are local citizens.

Copper and gold mining has been advancing since 2002 with development and launch of operations at Drmbon deposit. Approximately 27–28 thousand tons (wet weight) of concentrates are produced with average copper content of 19–21% and gold content of 32–34 g/t.

== Wine and brandy ==
Wine growing and processing of agricultural products, particularly wine (i.e., storage of wine, wine stuff, cognac alcohol) is one of the prioritized directions of the economic development. The region is known for wine-making since ancient times, especially the southern part, where the Artsakh vineyards are mainly found. It is home to the Khndoghni/Sireni grape variety. The climate of the region combined with its fertile soil allows to produce a unique variety of grapes, at an average height of 800 meters above sea level. Many wine karases (jugs) dating back to the 7th century, were found in the archaeological sites near the village of Togh. Amongst the wine producers formerly based in Artsakh include the Stepanakert Brandy Factory, operating since 1931 in Stepanakert with branches in Yerevan, Martuni and Karmir Shuka. The company produces a variety of cognac under the brand Madatoff, wine under the brand Berdashen, and fruit vodka under the brand Karabakh.

The Artsakh Brandy Company, opened in 1998 in Aygestan village of Askeran Region, was also active in Artsakh. The factory produces a variety of cognac under the brand Artsakh Ohanyan, fruit brandy under the brand Artsakh, wine under the brand Artsakh Shushi, and vodka under the brand Ohanyan. Kataro Winery of Anush-1 Company, opened in 2010 in Togh village of Hadrut Region, Artsakh. The winery produced a variety of Khndogni/Sireni wine from the vineyards of pre-2020 Artsakh, under the brand Kataro. The Mika-Hadrut Winery, in Hadrut, Hadrut Region, produced a variety of cognac, wine and vodka under the brand Mika. Other producers include Askeran Wine, in Askeran, Askeran Region, for wine and vodka, Aragil Winery, in Shekher, Martuni Region, known for its Shekher wine, Balasanyan Winery, in Askeran, Askeran Region, known for its Tat U Pap wine and vodka, Lia Cooperative, in Martakert, Martakert Region, which produces Martakert wine, the Hayrapetyan Brothers Winery, in Karmir Shuka village of Martuni Region, which produces a variety of wine, the Tnjri-2000" Cooperative, in Martuni, Martuni Region, which also produces a variety of wine, and Piank Winery, in Khramort, Askeran Region, known for its Vanqasar wine.

== External aid ==
NKR government has been a recipient of financial aid from the United States ($8 mln in 2010) and Armenia ($30 mln).

Armenian Diaspora has also been instrumental in providing some financial assistance through "Hayastan" All-Armenian Fund, Monte Melkonian Fund, Artsakh Investment Fund as well as direct micro-assistance schemes.

== See also ==
- Artsakhbank
- Artsakh dram
- Economy of Armenia
