= Villiers-le-Bel–Gonesse–Arnouville station =

Train station (Paris RER)

Villiers-le-Bel – Gonesse – Arnouville
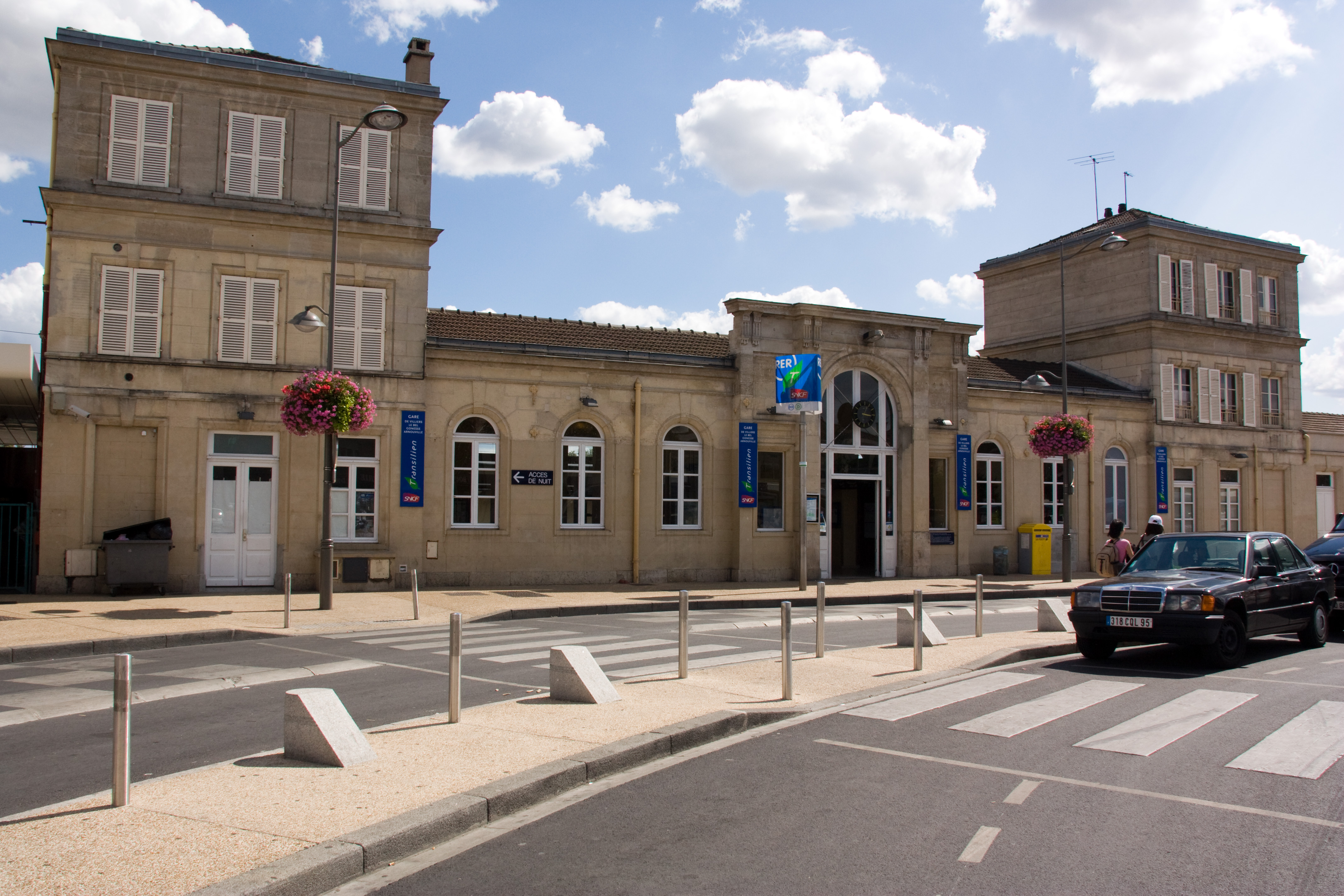
- Gare de Villiers-le-Bel – Gonesse – Arnouville main building

General information
- Location: 1, Place du Général Leclerc, 95400 Arnouville, Val d'Oise, Île-de-France, France
- Coordinates: 48°59′39″N 2°24′59″E
- Elevation: 69 m (226 ft)
- Operator: SNCF
- Lines: Paris-Lille railway RER D
- Platforms: 4 (including 1 emergency platform)
- Tracks: 7
- Train operators: SNCF
- Connections: RATP Bus Lines 268, 270, 370

Other information
- Station code: 87276220
- Fare zone: 4

History
- Opened: 1859

Passengers
- 2024: 12,566,762

Services
Preceding station	RER	Following station
Goussainville towards Creil	RER D	Garges–Sarcelles towards Corbeil-Essonnes
Goussainville Terminus	RER D	Garges–Sarcelles towards Melun
Location

Villiers-le-Bel – Gonesse – Arnouville is a railway station in Arnouville, Val d'Oise, Île-de-France, France. The station was opened in 1859 and is on the Paris–Lille railway. The station is served by the RER Line D, which is operated by SNCF. The station serves the communes of Arnouville, to the north Villiers-le-Bel and, to the east, Gonesse.

== History ==
The line from Saint-Denis station to Creil via Survilliers - Fosses was opened in 1859 by the Chemins de fer du Nord after six years of studies, with two tracks built at the station. That number was then doubled in 1907. A fifth track was laid during the construction of the LGV Nord in the early 1990s between Pierrefitte station and the new Gonesse junction.

== Station info ==
Situated at an altitude at 69 meters above sea level, the station is on the 14.759 kilometer point of the Paris-Lille railway, between the stations of Garges–Sarcelles and Goussainville. The station served 12,566,762 people in 2024, and 9,347,400 people in 2014.

== Train services ==
The following services serve the station:

- Local services (RER D) Goussainville – Villiers-le-Bel – Gare du Nord – Gare de Lyon – Combs-la-Ville–Quincy – Melun
- Local services (RER D) Creil – Orry-la-Ville–Coye – Villiers-le-Bel – Gare du Nord – Gare de Lyon – Juvisy – Évry-Courcouronnes – Corbeil-Essonnes

== Tramway of Villiers-le-Bel ==
From 1878 to 1949, a tram line, the Villiers-le-Bel tramway, linked the station to the village of Villiers-le-Bel. As the commune center of Villiers-le-Bel was not quite that easily accessible to the station, the tramway started between the two places. Due to the growing amount of competitors (private cars, and other buses were more efficient), the tramway closed down in 1949.
