= Artsakh dram =

Currency of Artsakh

արցախյան դրամ (Armenian)
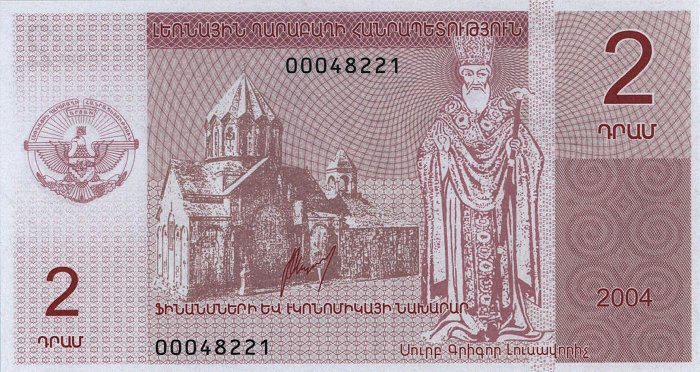
- 2 dram banknote (obverse)

ISO 4217
- Code: None

Units of account
- Symbol: Դր.
- Subunit
- 1/100: luma

Denominations
- Banknotes: 2 dram, 10 dram
- Coins: 50 luma, 1 dram, 5 dram, 1000 dram

Demographics
- Date of introduction: 2003
- Date of withdrawal: January 1, 2024
- User(s): Artsakh (alongside Armenian dram)

Issuance
- Central bank: Republic of Artsakh Ministry of Finance
- Website: minfin-nkr.am
- Printer: Österreichische Staatsdruckerei (Austria State Printing House)

Valuation
- Inflation: N/A
- Pegged with: Armenian dram
- This infobox shows the latest status before this currency was rendered obsolete.

The Artsakh dram (Armenian: արցախյան դրամ) was a monetary unit of the de facto independent Republic of Artsakh, which was dissolved on 1 January 2024 in the aftermath of Azerbaijani offensive in Nagorno-Karabakh. Despite being legal tender, it was not as widely used as the Armenian dram.

== Coins ==
Two commemorative coins were issued in 2003, while seven different coins have also been issued, all dated 2004. They are two aluminum 50 luma coins featuring a horse and a leaping antelope, three aluminum 1 dram coins featuring a wildcat, a pheasant and St. Gregory the Illuminator, two aluminum-bronze 5 dram coins featuring the Ghazanchetsots Cathedral in the town of Shushi and the We Are Our Mountains monument right outside Stepanakert, and two aluminum 1000 dram coins featuring Lake Van and Kevork Chavush. A new series of coins was issued in 2013, and consists of two 50 luma coins featuring a horse and antelope, three 1 dram coins depicting a leopard, wolf and pheasant and two five dram coins showing a bear and a capricorn.

Denomination	Date of first minting	Composition	Diameter (mm)	Mass (g)	Obverse	Reverse	Image
50 Luma	2004	Al	20,00	0,95	Coat of arms of the Republic of Artsakh	Horse	
50 Luma	2004	Al	20,00	0,95	Coat of arms of the Republic of Artsakh	Antelope	
1 Dram	2004	Al	21,90	1,15	Coat of arms of the Republic of Artsakh	Phasianidae	
1 Dram	2004	Al	21,90	1,15	Coat of arms of the Republic of Artsakh	Saint Gregory the Illuminator	
1 Dram	2004	Al	21,90	1,15	Coat of arms of the Republic of Artsakh	Cheetah	
5 Dram	2004	Cu+Ni+Zn	21,90	4,50	Coat of arms of the Republic of Artsakh	Ghazanchetsots Cathedral	
5 Dram	2004	Cu+Ni+Zn	21,90	4,50	Coat of arms of the Republic of Artsakh	We Are Our Mountains	
1000 Dram	2003	Al	21,90	1,15	Coat of arms of the Republic of Artsakh	Lake Van	
1000 Dram	2003	Al	21,90	1,15	Coat of arms of the Republic of Artsakh	Kevork Chavush	

== Banknotes ==
2 and 10 dram banknotes have been issued, bearing the date 2004 and printed by Österreichische Staatsdruckerei (Austria State Printing House).

2004 Series
Value	Main Colour	Images		Description		Date of	
Value	Main Colour	Obverse	Reverse	Obverse	Reverse	printing	issue
2 dram	Red			Gandzasar Cathedral of Saint John the Baptist in Mardakert district, Saint Gregory the Illuminator	Bas-relief Christian cross and John the Baptist baptizing Jesus Christ	2004	2004
10 dram	Green			Jesus holding gospels and raising hand in benediction, Dadivank monastery in Shahumian district	Ancient Hudaferin bridge, wine barrel with a bunch of grapes, Karabakh carpet	2004	2004

== See also ==
- Armenian dram
- Artsakhbank
- Economy of the Republic of Artsakh
- List of currencies
- List of historical currencies
