= Île-de-France tramway Line 5 =

Suburban tram line in Seine-Saint-Denis and Val-d'Oise, north of Paris

Coordinates: 48.9806°N 2.3692°E

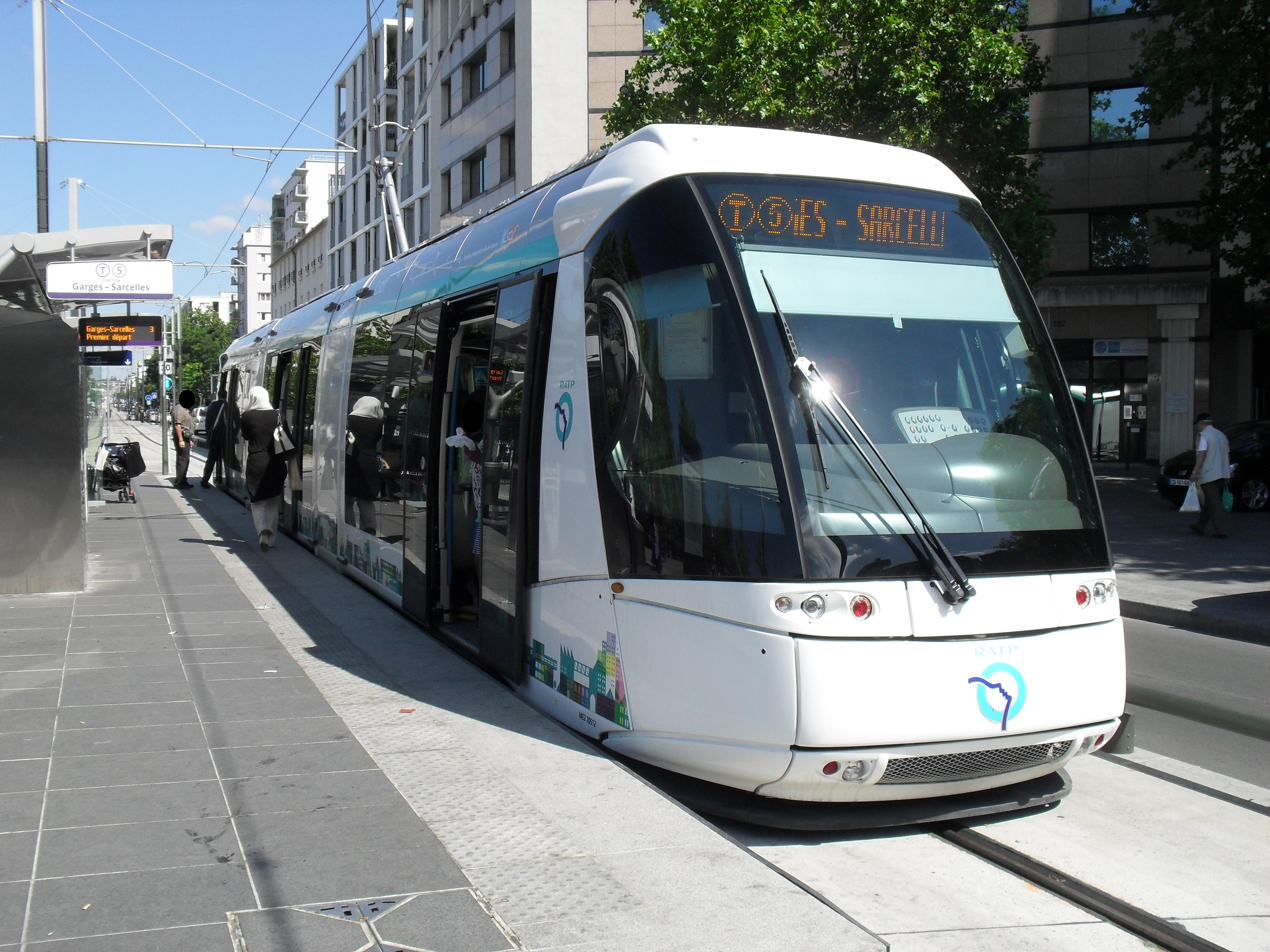
- Île-de-France tramway Line 5 at the Marché de Saint-Denis terminal

Overview
- Owner: Île-de-France Mobilités
- Termini: Garges–Sarcelles; Marché de Saint-Denis
- Stations: 16

Service
- Type: Tram
- System: Tramways in Île-de-France
- Operator: RATP Group
- Rolling stock: 17 Translohr STE3
- Ridership: Approx. 9 million per year

History
- Opened: 29 July 2013; 12 years ago

Technical
- Line length: 6.6 km (4.1 mi)
- Electrification: Overhead line, 750 V DC
Route map

Île-de-France tramway Line 5 (usually called simply T5) is part of the modern tram network of the Île-de-France region of France. Line T5 connects Garges–Sarcelles station and the centre of Saint-Denis (Marché de Saint-Denis) and , in the northern suburbs of Paris. Line T5 was Île-de-France's first rubber-tyred tramway line. The line has a length of 6.6 km (4.1 mi) and 16 stations. It opened to the public on 29 July 2013.

First envisioned during the 1990s as a means of providing better public transportation through Paris's northern suburbs, particularly the expanding districts of Pierrefitte-sur-Seine and Lochères in Sarcelles, actual planning activity for the line started during 1999. During February 2005, the defined Line 5 project was publicly announced by the Syndicat des Transports (STIF). Transit operator RATP was appointed as the principal contractor for performing the construction of the new line. During the latter part of 2009, work commenced upon Line 5's civil engineering works; construction commenced upon the track infrastructure and stations almost one year later.

The line is operated by the RATP Group under contract with Île-de-France Mobilités.

== Development ==
=== Background ===
Line T5 was designed with the stated aim of providing superior public transportation services in the northern suburbs of Paris, France, specifically the two neighborhoods of Pierrefitte-sur-Seine and Lochères in Sarcelles, which have been identified as possessing an expanding population during the years running up to the turn of the century. It was built to serve in excess of 86,000 neighbouring residents spread across five different communities, these being Saint-Denis, Pierrefitte-sur-Seine, Sarcelles, Garges-les-Gonesse and Montmagny. Key interchanges include St.Denis Market on the Line T1, Saint-Denis Basilica on Metro line 13 and at Garges-Sarcelles on Réseau Express Régional (RER) Line D.

Notably, Line 5 is unlike any previous tramways in the region in that it was designed to be a rubber-tyred tramway; as such, the completed line holds the distinction of being the first tyre-based tramway to be established in the Île-de-France region. Between 1999 and 2004, planning and surveying of the intended line was performed while the project was quietly defined by planning authorities. During February 2005, the Line 5 project was publicly announced by the Syndicat des Transports (STIF), the transport authority for the IIe-de-France region.

During November 2006, STIF issued its approval of the route's preliminary draft. During the first half of 2007, it was announced that an agreement concerning financing had been signed between the project's major stakeholders. Transit operator RATP became the principal contractor for the Line 5's construction, which included multiple stations and a maintenance depot. The regional councils of Val d’Oise and Seine-Saint-Denis were assigned responsibility for the civil works relating to the highway and associated public spaces. STIF served in a project management capacity on the construction phase, coordinating between the different parties involved.

=== Construction ===
During January 2008, work commenced upon preliminary construction of Line 5; during this phase, it was necessary to relocate numerous residents, pedestrian footpaths and bus stops along the route ahead of the actual construction activity. This displacement and relocation was supported by a one-off investment of €40.23 million, which was contributed by the regional council of Seine-Saint-Denis. Displacement work stated that same month in Valley d’ Oise; by January 2009, the process had reportedly reached the vicinity of Seine-Saint-Denis.

During the final months of 2009, civil engineering works commenced simultaneously in the Val d’Oise and Seine-Saint-Denis districts. In the latter half of 2010, work began on the construction of the tracks, platforms and the maintenance depot for Line 5. On 29 July 2013, the completed tramway was officially opened for revenue services.

Reportedly, Line 5 had been constructed at an estimated cost of €163.13 million. It is both owned and financed by STIF, who hold a 71.5 per stake in Line 5; the remaining minority stakes are owned by the State Region of France (17.2 per cent), the regional council of Val d’Oise (10 per cent) and RAPT (1.3 per cent). RATP is the body responsible for the line's operations, and has invested a total of €52 million on the procurement of its rolling stock.

== Rolling stock ==
The T5 is operated by a fleet of Translohr STE3 rubber-wheeled trams. During 2007, a contract for the delivery of 15 trams was awarded to Lohr Industries. The STE3 is a three-carriage tram vehicle; with a length of 25 metres, it provides sufficient capacity for the boarding of up to 127 passengers at a time. The trams are fitted with a relatively low floor, easing the boarding process for passengers, particularly those who have reduced mobility. Typically, each tram traverses the entire route within the space of 22 minutes, during which it normally achieves an average speed of 18 km/h (11 mph).

The tram vehicle possesses a relatively small axial radius of 10.5 metres, which is a favourable quality for the T5 line, which has been considered to be somewhat curvy and have sharp bends present along its route. For more consistent stopping distances, they are equipped with an anti-lock braking system (ABS) system. According to the rolling stock manufacturer Alstom, the Translohr tramway system combines the benefits of a guided system with those of tyre-based vehicles, including increased brake performance due to the greater adhesion of tyres, lower noise levels and favourable gradient performance. The Translohr tram system, as used on Line 5, is also used on Line 6, which was planned and built around the same time period.

== Gallery ==
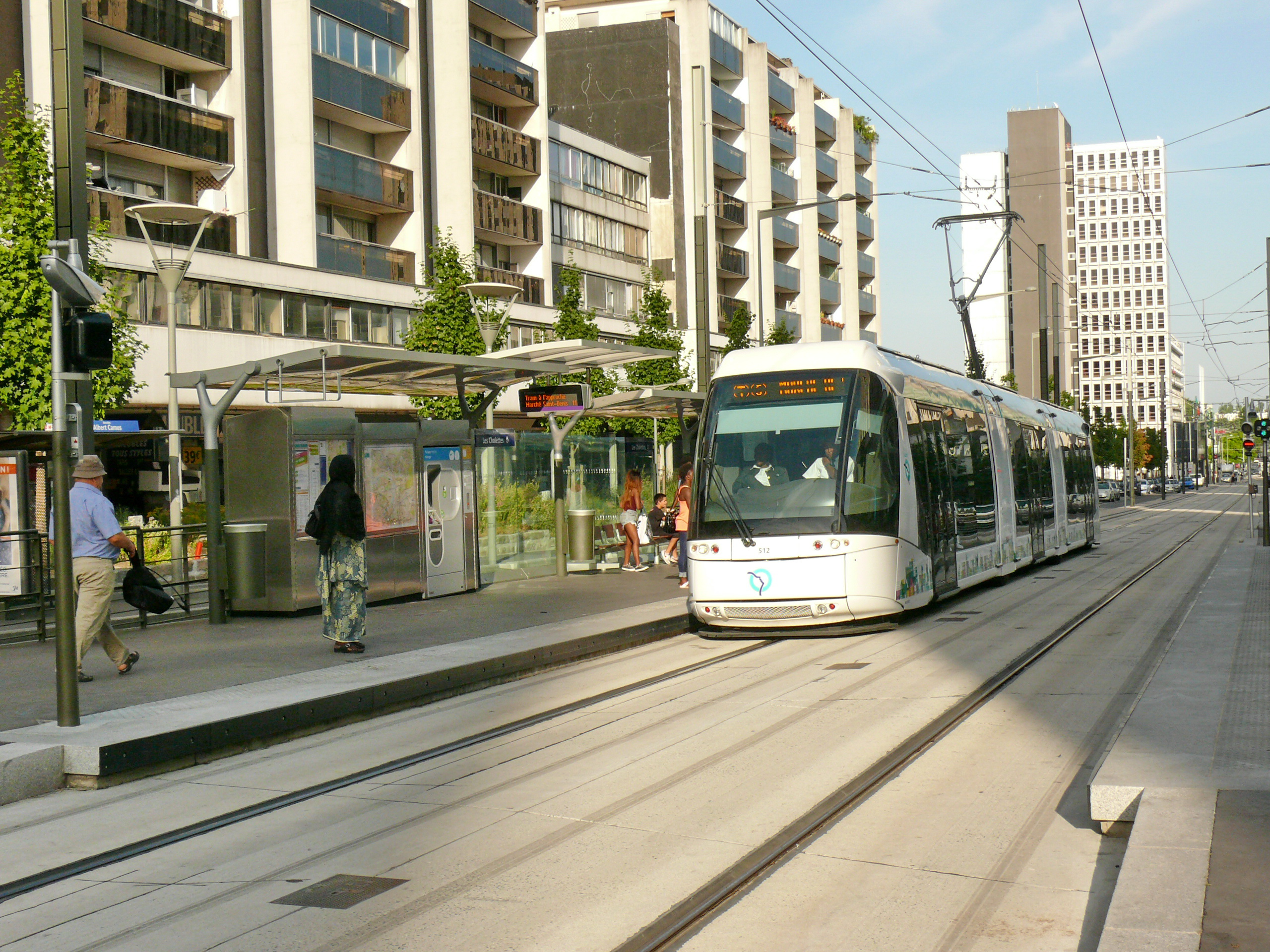
T5 tramway at Les Cholettes station

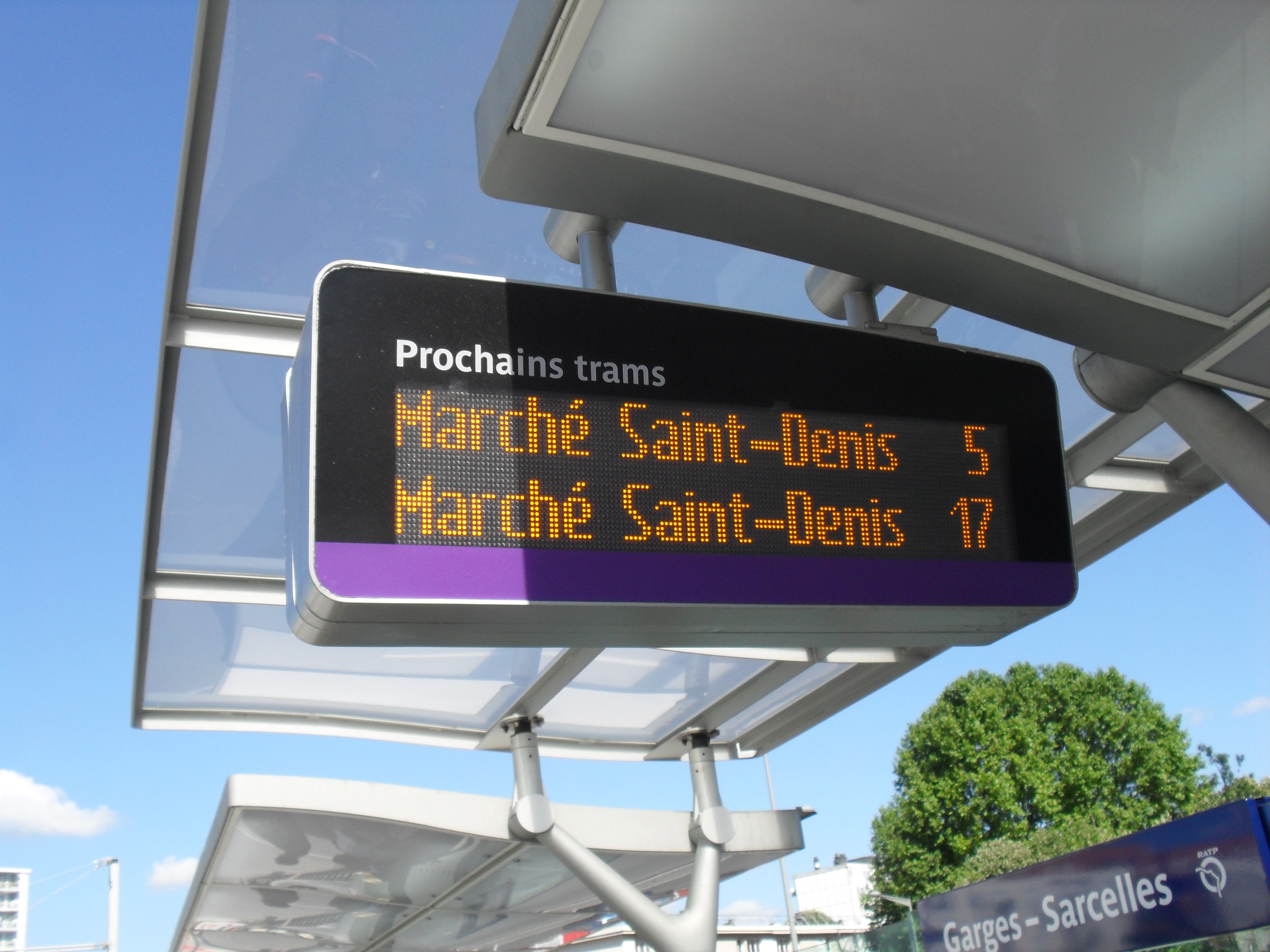
The SIEL system at work at Garges-Sarcelles.

== See also ==
- List of rubber-tyred tram systems
