= Garges–Sarcelles station =

Railway station in Île-de-France

Coordinates: 48.9761°N 2.3900°E

Garges–Sarcelles
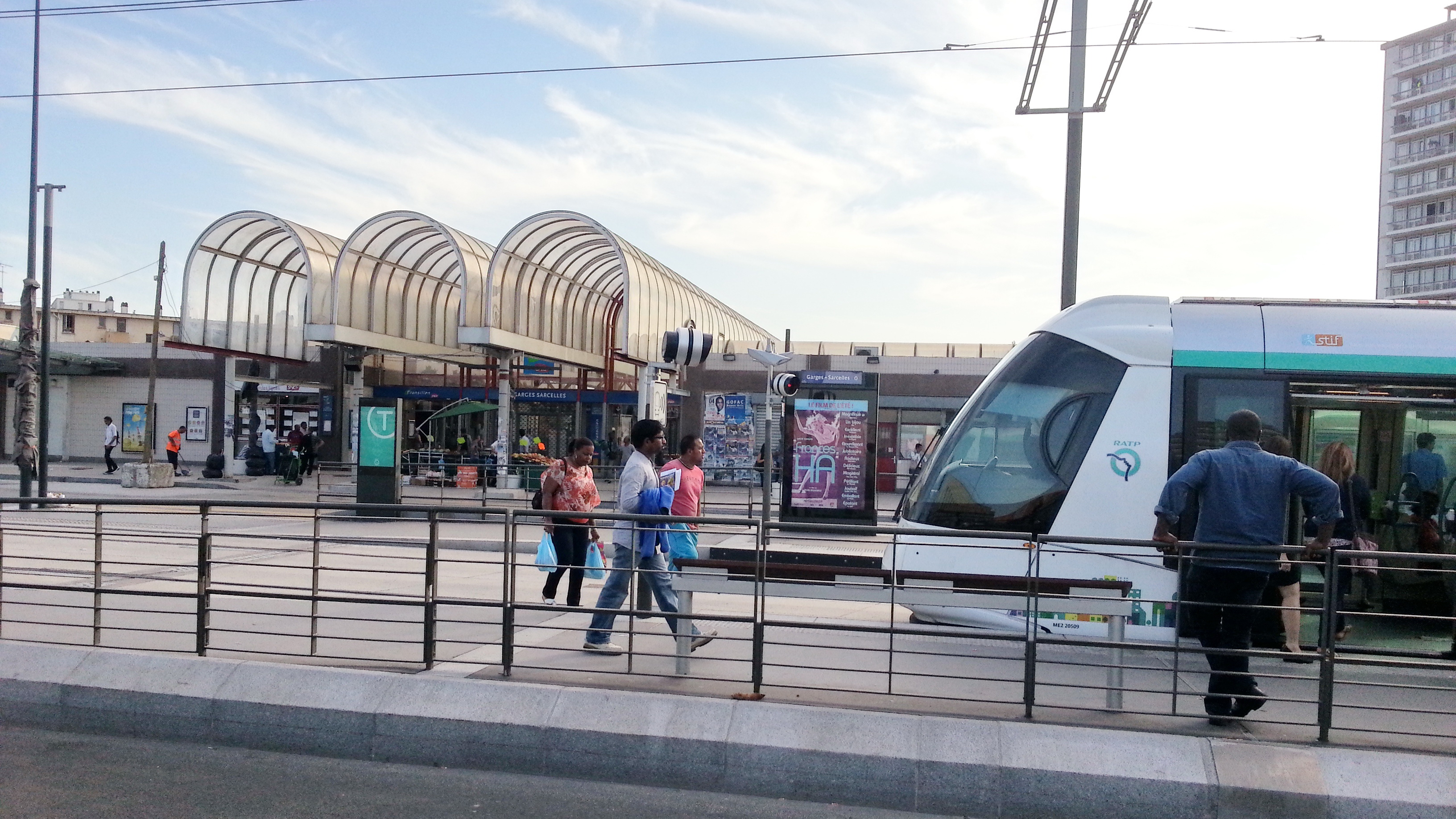
- Tram stop with the entrance to the station in the background

General information
- Location: Avenue Anatole-France, 95140 Garges-lès-Gonesse; France
- Owner: SNCF
- Operator: SNCF
- Lines: RER D T5
- Platforms: 2 island platforms and 1 side platform
- Tracks: 5

Construction
- Accessible: Yes, by prior reservation

Other information
- Station code: 87276196

History
- Opened: 1858

Passengers
- 2024: 22,265,054

Services
Preceding station	RER	Following station
Villiers-le-Bel–Gonesse–Arnouville towards Creil	RER D	Pierrefitte–Stains towards Corbeil-Essonnes
Villiers-le-Bel–Gonesse–Arnouville towards Goussainville	RER D	Pierrefitte–Stains towards Melun
Location

Garges–Sarcelles (French pronunciation: [ɡaʁʒ saʁsɛl]) is a railway station in Île-de-France. The station is served by the RER D and serves the communes of Garges-lès-Gonesse and Sarcelles.

The station is also the terminus of Île-de-France tramway Line 5.
