= Garges-lès-Gonesse =

- Commune
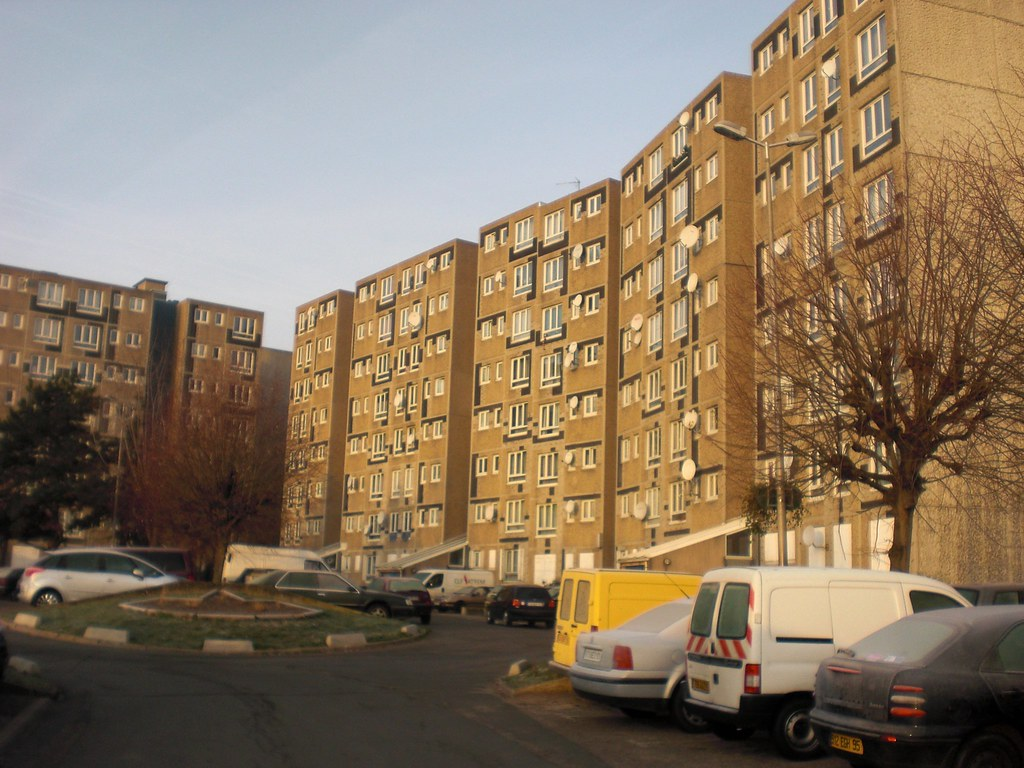
- One of the city's projects and major urban concentrations, Les Doucettes.

- Coat of arms

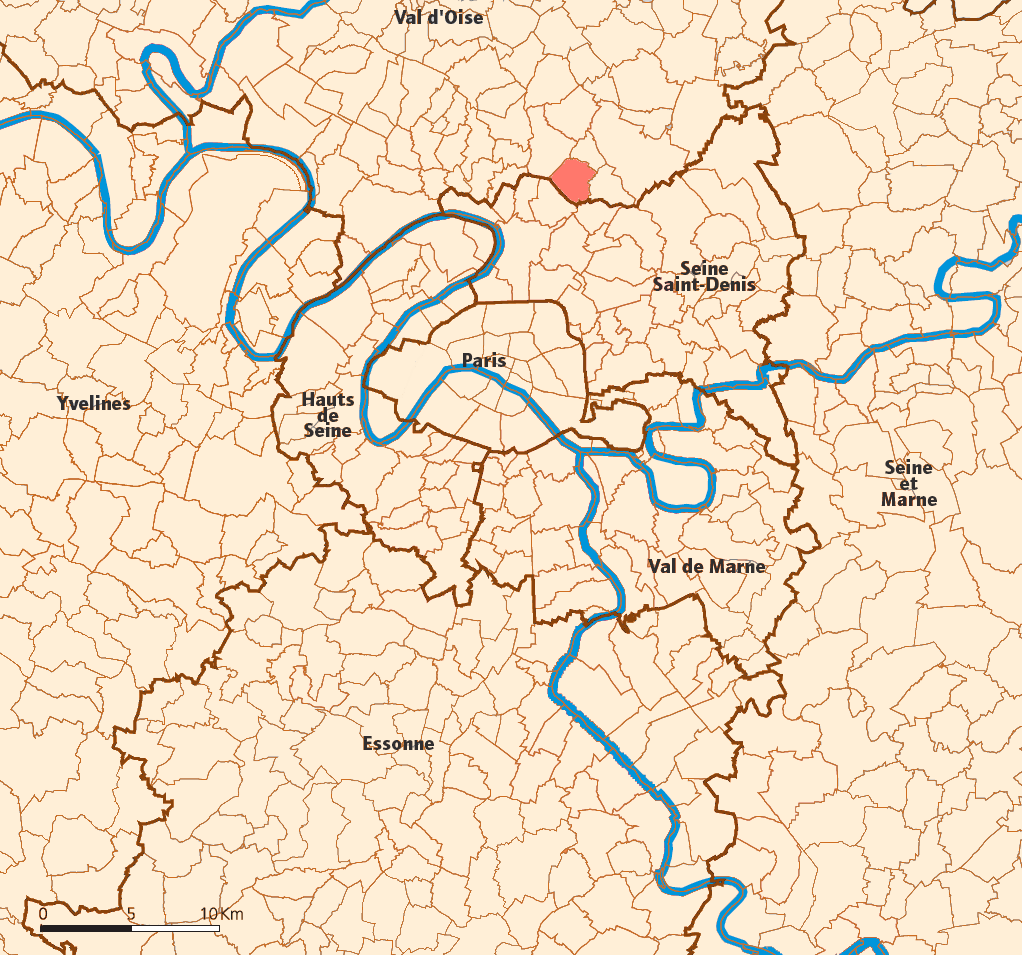
- Location (in red) within Paris inner and outer suburbs
- Location of Garges-lès-Gonesse
- Location within France Location within Île-de-France (region)
- Coordinates: 48°58′22″N 2°24′03″E
- Country: France
- Region: Île-de-France
- Department: Val-d'Oise
- Arrondissement: Sarcelles
- Canton: Garges-lès-Gonesse
- Intercommunality: CA Roissy Pays de France

Government
  - Mayor (2020–2026): Benoît Jimenez
- Area^{1}: 5.47 km^{2} (2.11 sq mi)
- Elevation: 60 m (200 ft)
- Highest elevation: 80 m (260 ft)
- Lowest elevation: 34 m (112 ft)
- Population (2023): 41,791
  - Density: 7,640/km^{2} (19,800/sq mi)
- Time zone: UTC+01:00 (CET)
  - Summer (DST): UTC+02:00 (CEST)
- INSEE/Postal code: 95268 /95140
- ^{1} French Land Register data, which excludes lakes, ponds, glaciers > 1 km^{2} (0.386 sq mi or 247 acres) and river estuaries.

Garges-lès-Gonesse (French pronunciation: [ɡaʁʒ lɛ ɡɔnɛs], literally Garges near Gonesse) is a commune in the Val-d'Oise department in northern France. It is located in the northern suburbs of Paris, 14.1 km (8.8 mi) from the center of Paris. The city is a part of the Paris urban area. It is the seat of the canton of Garges-lès-Gonesse, which also covers Arnouville.

The city is strongly urbanized and is near the Paris–Le Bourget Airport. Garges-lès-Gonesse was transformed from an old rural village to a suburb at the beginning of the 20th century.

== Toponymy ==
The name Garges possibly derives from the Old Germanic wardja, meaning 'place of guard', referring to a Frankish fort built in the 4th century.

== History ==
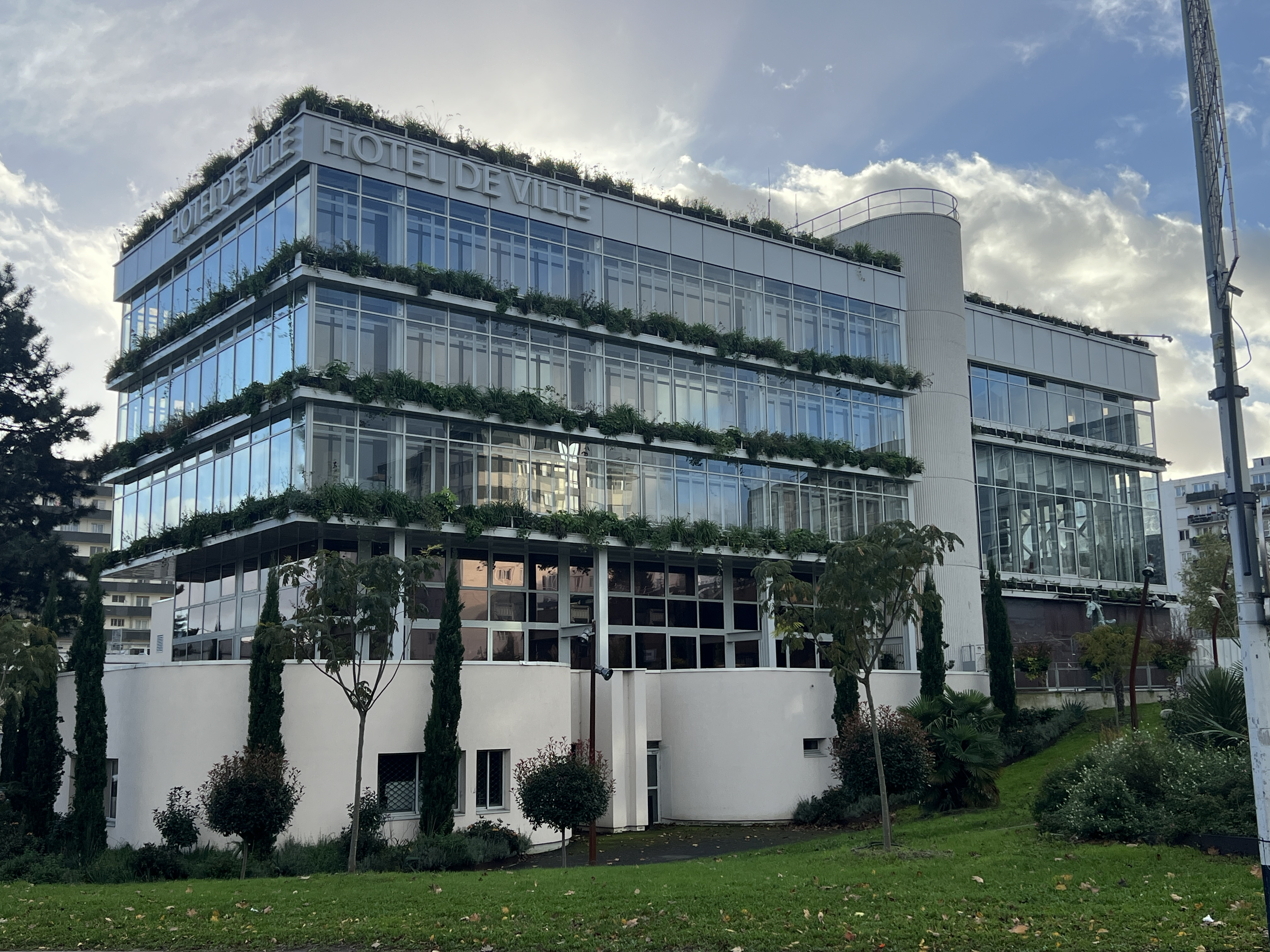
The Hôtel de Ville

The Hôtel de Ville was completed in 1975.

== Population ==
Historical population

Year	Pop.	±% p.a.
1793	554	—
1821	483	−0.49%
1846	437	−0.40%
1872	360	−0.74%
1886	540	+2.94%
1901	639	+1.13%
1906	688	+1.49%
1911	681	−0.20%
1921	1,211	+5.93%
1926	1,805	+8.31%
1931	2,621	+7.75%
1936	3,330	+4.90%

Year	Pop.	±% p.a.
1946	3,536	+0.60%
1954	4,814	+3.93%
1962	10,483	+10.22%
1968	27,312	+17.30%
1975	37,927	+4.80%
1982	40,182	+0.83%
1990	42,144	+0.60%
1999	40,058	−0.56%
2007	39,098	−0.30%
2012	41,001	+0.96%
2017	42,728	+0.83%
2023	41,791	−0.37%

Source: EHESS and INSEE (1968-2023)

== Transport ==
Garges-lès-Gonesse is served by Garges – Sarcelles station on Paris RER line D.

== Education ==
Primary schools:

- 13 preschools
- 11 elementary schools
- Four combined preschools and elementary schools

Secondary schools:

- Junior high schools: Paul Eluard, Henri Wallon, Pablo Picasso, and Henri Matisse
- Senior high school/sixth-form college: Lycée Simone de Beauvoir
- Vocational high school: Lycée professionel Arthur Rimbaud

== Personalities ==
Andre Soares, author

- Marc Macedot, athlete
- Mr. Brainwash, street artist
- Wissam Ben Yedder, footballer

== See also ==
- Communes of the Val-d'Oise department
