= Coat of arms of Artsakh =

National coat of arms

- Armiger: Republic of Artsakh
- Adopted: November 17, 1992
- Shield: We Are Our Mountains monument, Or; Per fess, the first a panorama of a mountain range Azure and Argent, the second a vertically set flag of the Republic of Artsakh
- Supporters: An Eagle proper displayed, above the Eagle's head, a ornamented crown Or.
- Motto: Armenian: Լեռնային Ղարաբաղի Հանրապետություն-Արցախ "Artsakh Republic of Mountainous Karabakh"
- Other elements: In the eagle's talons are various agricultural products including wheat and grapes

The coat of arms of the Republic of Artsakh consists of an eagle above which is an ornamented crown. On the chest of the eagle is a shield with a panorama of a mountain range and under it a vertically set Flag of the Republic of Artsakh. Over this are the two stone heads of "Granny and Gramps" (Տատիկ և Պապիկ, Tatik yev Papik) from the We Are Our Mountains monument in Stepanakert, the capital of Artsakh. The eagle's feet clutch various agricultural products including wheat and grapes. The outer rim is made up of a golden circular ribbon bearing inscription "Լեռնային Ղարաբաղի Հանրապետություն-Արցախ, Lerrnayin Gharabaghi Hanrapetut’yun-Arts’akh" ("Artsakh Republic of Mountainous Karabakh") in Armenian.

The coat of arms was adopted by the decision of the Supreme Council of the Republic on 17 November 1992, and is regulated by the "Charter on the State Coat of Arms of the NKR".

Following an Azerbaijani offensive on 19 September 2023, Artsakh agreed to dissolve itself by 1 January 2024. However, in October, the government of Artsakh established a government-in-exile in Yerevan. Whilst in exile, they repealed the decree which would dissolve Artsakh's institutions on 22 December 2023.

== Description ==
The coat of arms is an image of an eagle with outstretched wings, above the head of which is the crown of the Artaxiad dynasty. On the eagle's chest there is a shield divided into two parts: in the upper part there is a panorama of Bolshoy Kirs Mountain, the highest point of the republic and the Karabakh Ridge, in the lower part there is a vertical image of the flag of Nagorno-Karabakh.

In the center of the shield is the monument "We are our Mountains" in Stepanakert (Khankendi), the capital of Artsakh. The eagle holds the fruits of agriculture: wheat, grapes and mulberries. The eagle is surrounded by a golden ribbon with the inscription "Nagorno-Karabakh Republic — Artsakh" in black letters in Armenian:

Լեռնային Ղարաբաղի Հանրապետություն Արցախ

The author explained the symbolism of the coat of arms as follows: the edges of the six feathers of the eagle's outstretched wings turn into an ornament — these are six vowel letters of the Armenian alphabet, and below 36 feathers, this is a quote from the Armenian poet Gevorg Emin: a regiment of 36 people defended the nation, these are words about 36 letters of the alphabet. The crown of Tigran the Great above the eagle's head, indicating the wealth and power of the Artaxiads, symbolizes the eternity of passing generations. Wheat ears indicate abundance and hospitality, each ear consists of 13 grains — one guiding, the rest paired according to the number of months of the year, "I pray to God that He will give us bread all year round, so that we can allocate a share of it to others," said Lavrent Galayan.

== Gallery ==
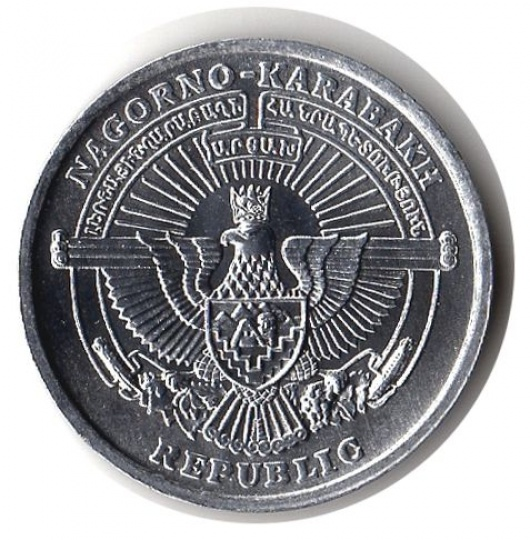
Coat of arms on a 1 dram coin

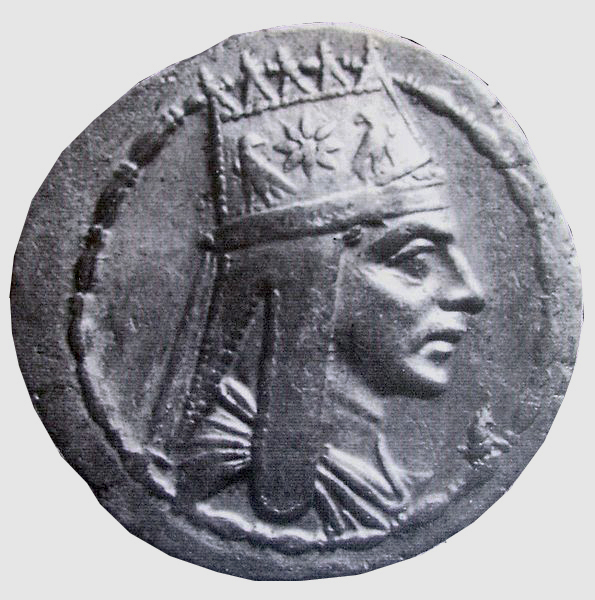
Coin of Tigran the Great with the image of the crown of the Artaxiad dynasty

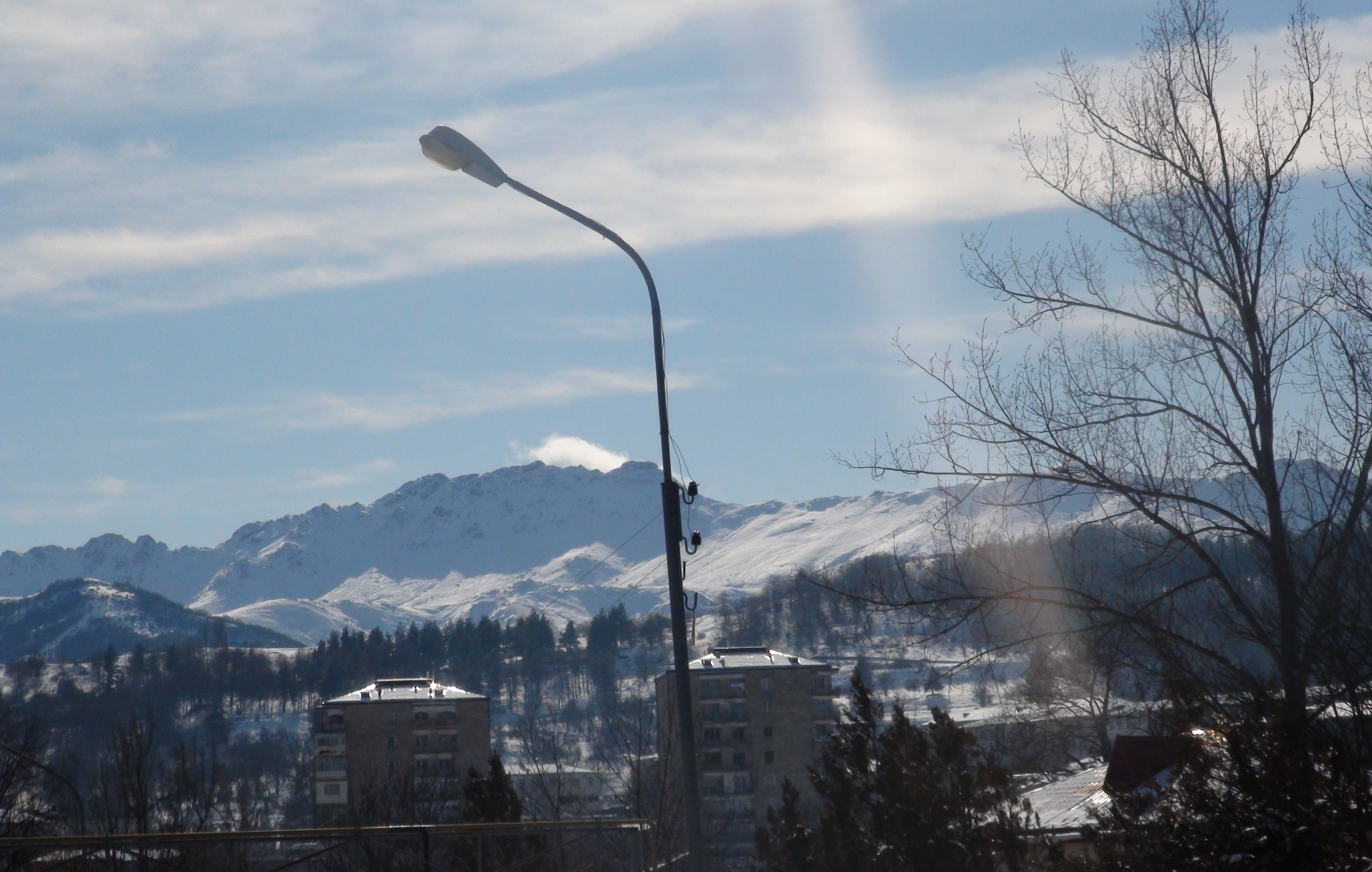
Bolshoy Kirs Mountain

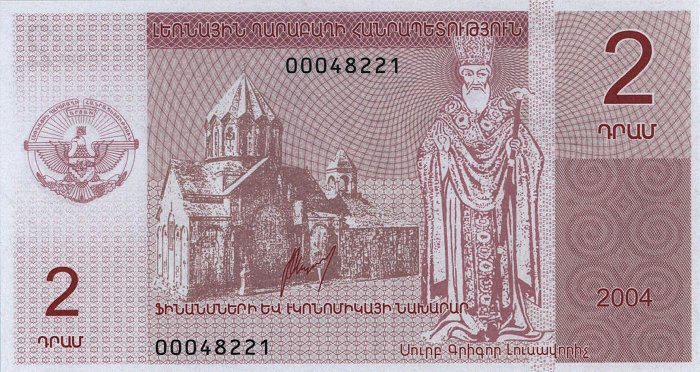
Coat of arms on a 2 dram banknote

== See also ==
- Coat of arms of Armenia
- Flag of Artsakh
