= Canton of Garges-lès-Gonesse =

Coordinates: 48.97°N 2.40°E

The canton of Garges-lès-Gonesse is an administrative division of the Val-d'Oise department, Île-de-France region, northern France. It was created at the French canton reorganisation which came into effect in March 2015. Its seat is in Garges-lès-Gonesse.

It consists of the following communes:

1. Arnouville
2. Garges-lès-Gonesse
