= Flag of Artsakh =

National flag

Republic of Artsakh
- Use: National flag
- Proportion: 1:2
- Adopted: 2 June 1992
- Relinquished: 1 October 2023
- Design: A horizontal tricolour of red, blue, and orange with a white sideways zig-zag chevron in the fly
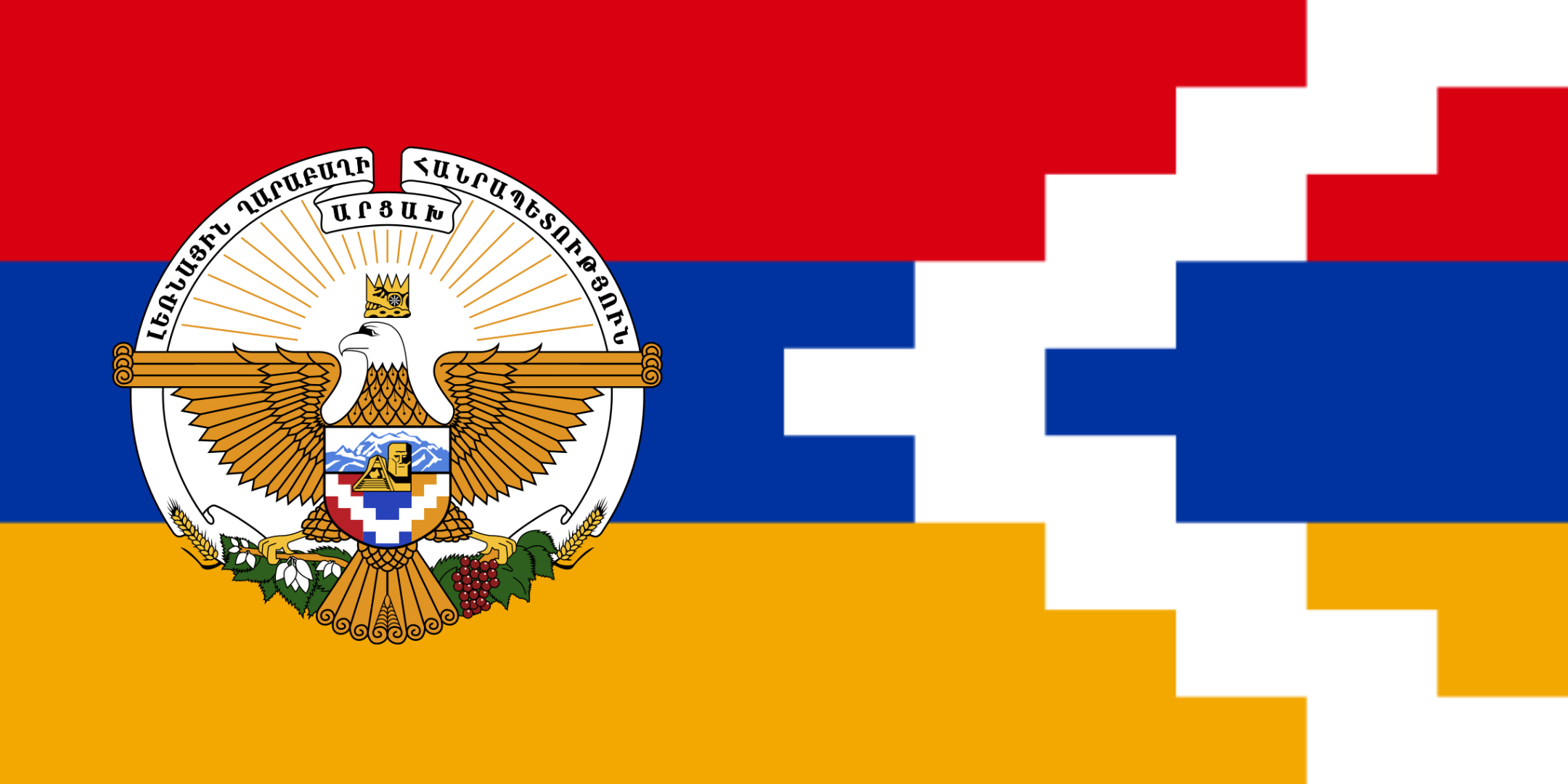
- Use: Presidential Standard
- Proportion: 1:2
- Design: A horizontal tricolour of red, blue, orange, and a white sideways zig-zag chevron in the fly, defaced with the Emblem at its centre.

On 2 June 1992, the Nagorno-Karabakh Republic (NKR), a former breakaway state in the South Caucasus region, adopted a flag derived from the flag of Armenia, to which a white, five-toothed, stepped carpet pattern is added, beginning at the two verges of the flag's fly and meeting at a point equal to one-third of the distance from that side. The NKR was renamed the Republic of Artsakh in 2017 after a referendum and retained the flag. Following an Azerbaijani offensive on 19 September 2023, Artsakh agreed to dissolve itself by 1 January 2024. However, Samvel Shahramanyan said that there was no official document stipulating the dissolution of government institutions, implying that the republic may continue as a government in exile. As of 21 July 2024, the government of Artsakh is currently in exile in Yerevan.

== Description ==
The flag is a rectangular panel of three horizontal and equal-length stripes. On the right side of the panel is a white five-pronged stepped carpet pattern. The pattern occupies one-third of the flag. The flag's aspect ratio is 1:2. The flag was adopted on 2 June 1992.

The symbolism of the colors is as follows: Red—the ongoing struggle of the Armenian people for existence, Christian faith, independence and freedom, blue—the will of the Armenian people to live under a peaceful sky, orange—solidarity and hard work of the Armenian people, and the white pattern represents the mountains of Armenian Artsakh, and also forms an arrow pointing westward to symbolize the aspiration for eventual union with Armenia. This symbolizes the Armenian heritage, culture and population of the area, and the triangular shape and zigzag cut represent Artsakh as a separated region of Armenia. The white pattern on the flag is also similar to the designs used on rugs, a symbol of national identity.

== History ==
Designed on the basis of the Armenian tricolor, featuring a zigzag pattern of white color reminiscent of ornaments and patterns of traditional Armenian carpets.

The idea of color separation and sketch came from the first head of the NKR Supreme Council Artur Mkrtchyan. The flag design is attributed to Syrian-born Armenian-American Vahé Fattal, a well-known painter, graphic designer, art collector and philanthropist. In recognition of his design, he was invited to Stepanakert in 1993 by the Supreme Council of the Republic of Nagorno-Karabakh.

By the decree of the Supreme Council of the Nagorno-Karabakh Republic of 26 January 1993, the coat of arms, flag and anthem of the NKR were approved. The flag is enshrined in the Constitution of the Republic of Artsakh, and was adopted at a national referendum held on 10 December 2006. The Law "On the Flag, Coat of Arms and Anthem of the NKR" was adopted on 27 November 2008. The description of the flag has undergone minor changes in the 2017 NKR Constitution.

== Gallery ==
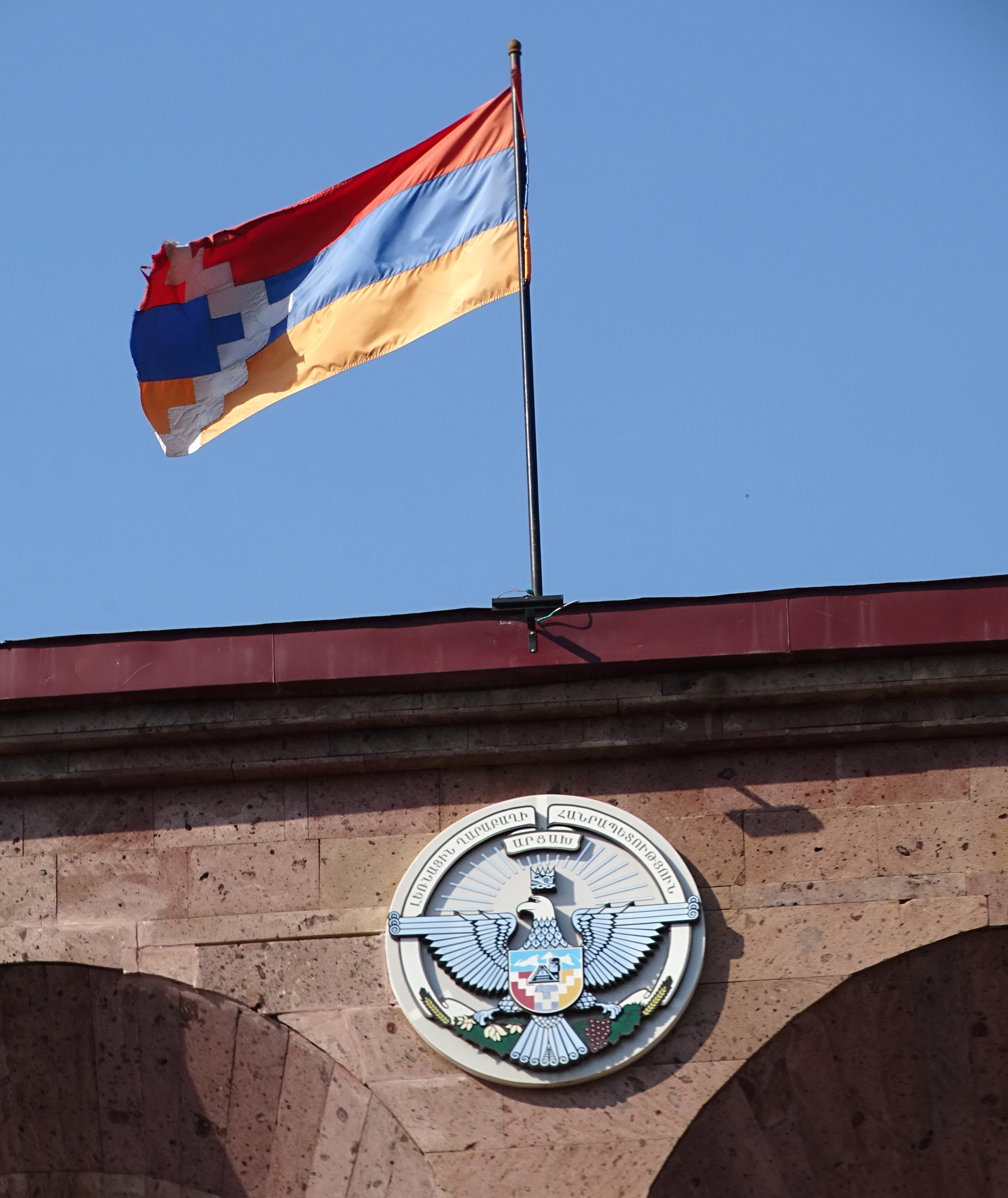

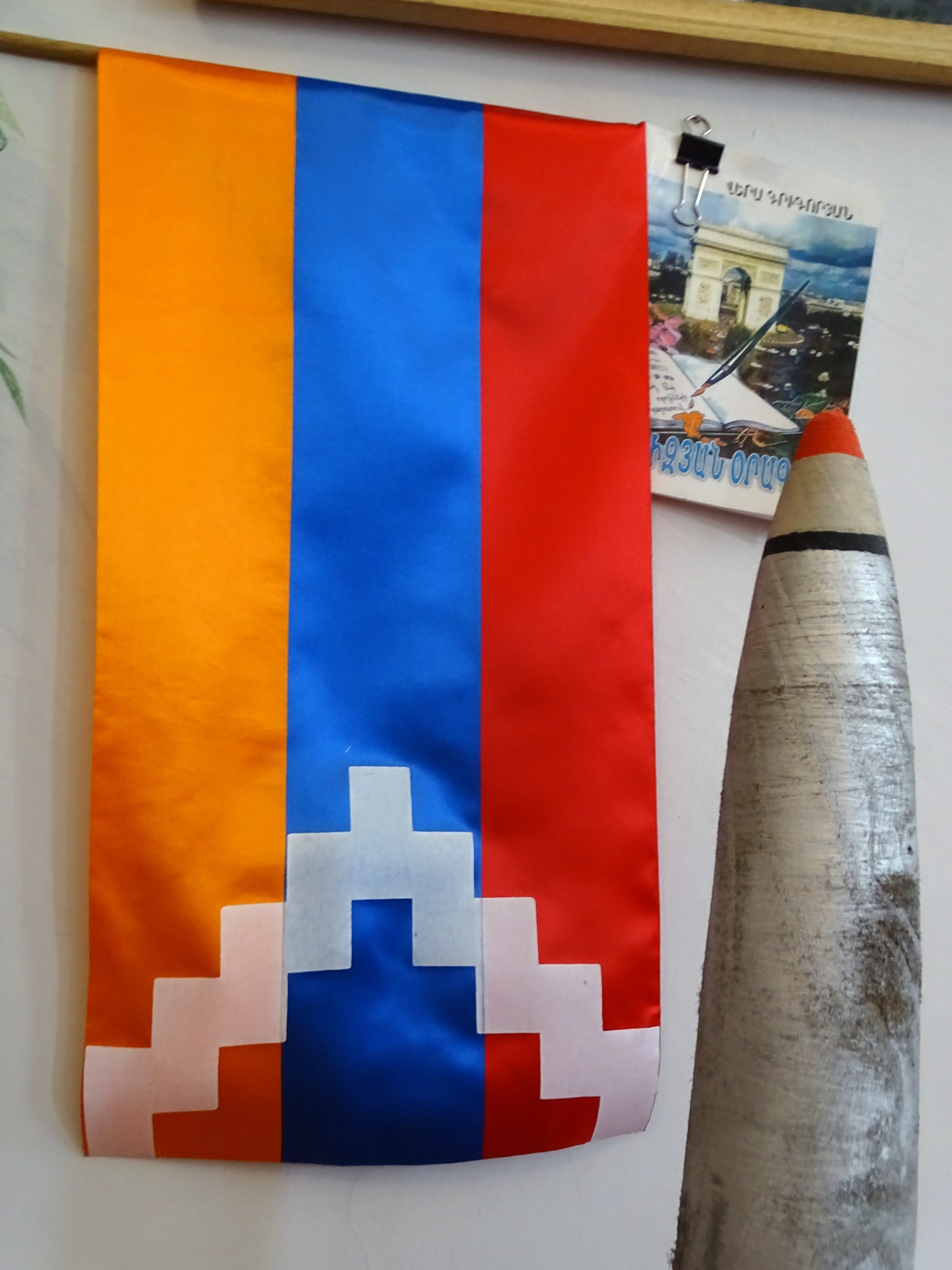

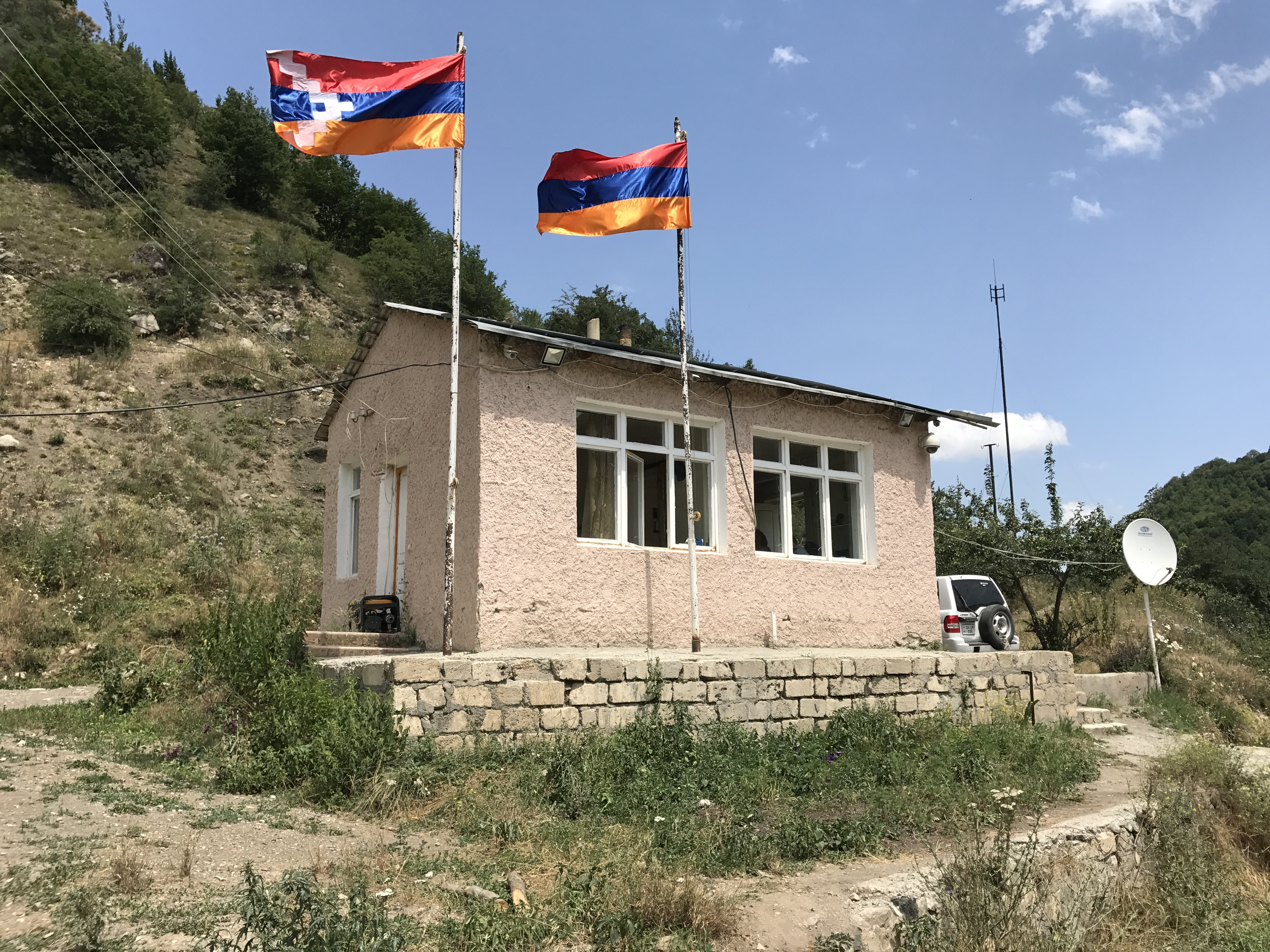

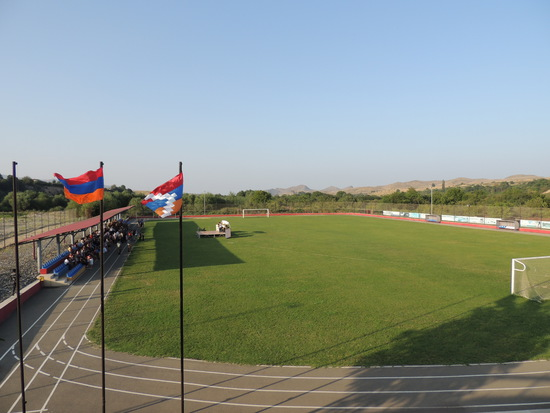

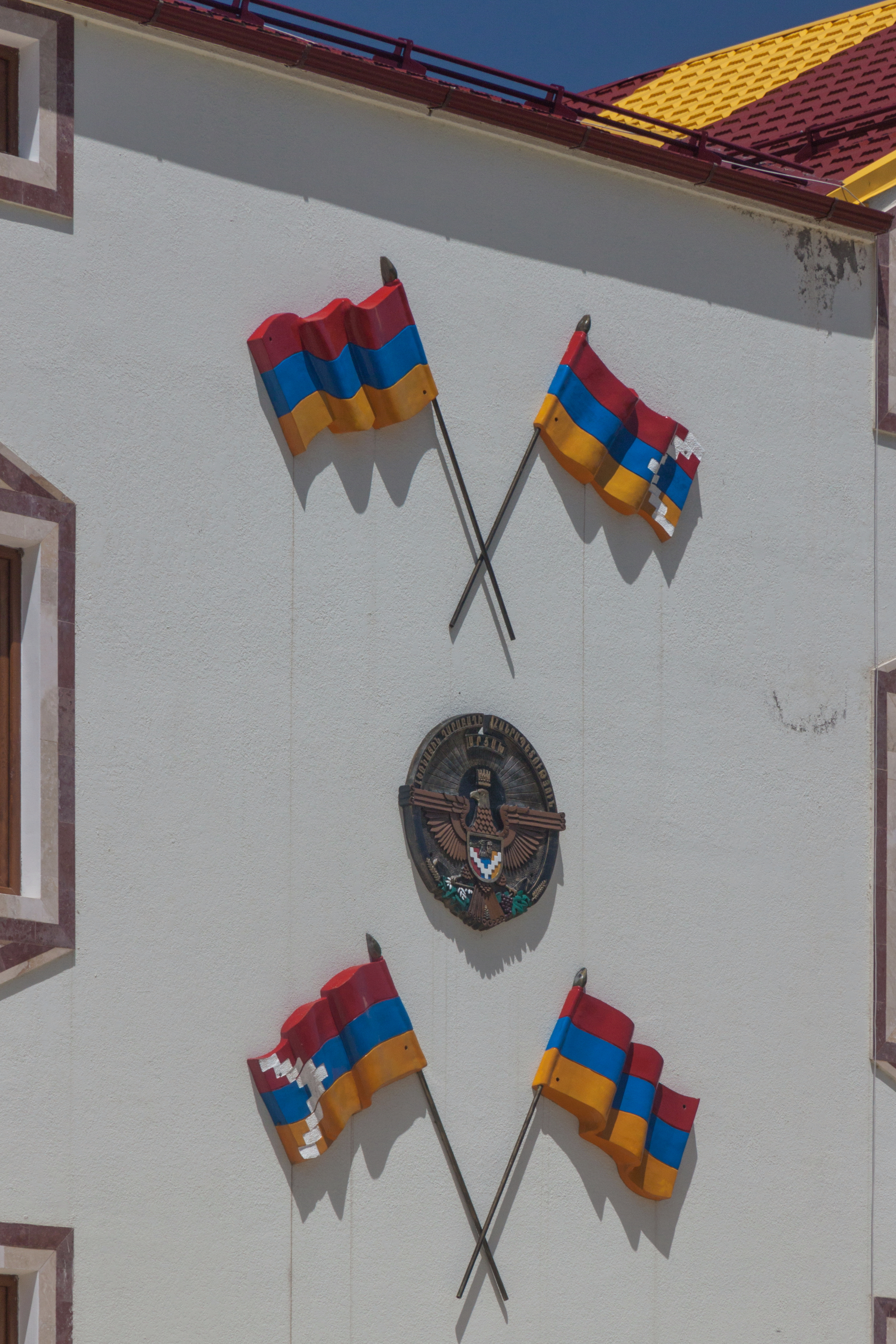

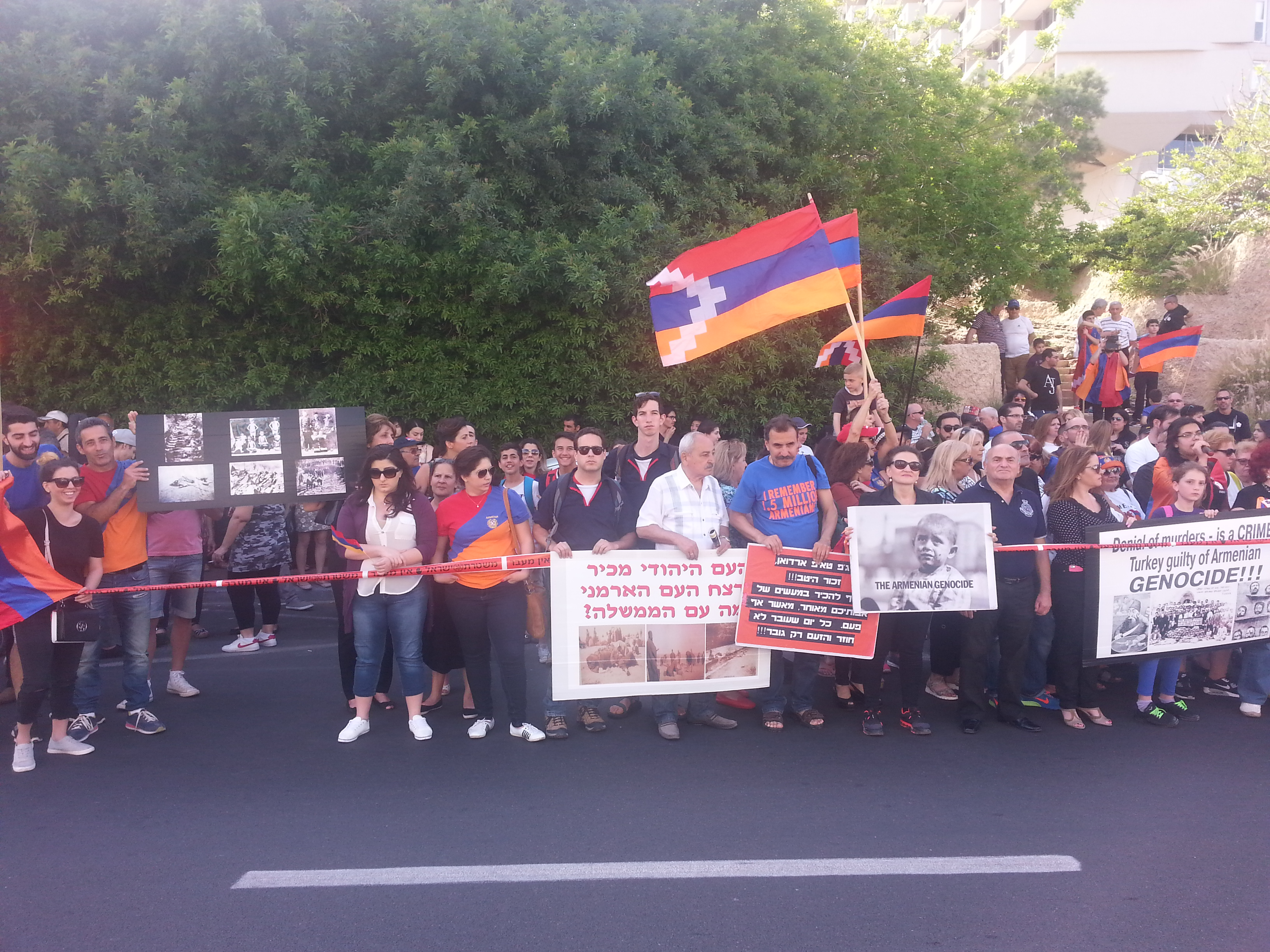

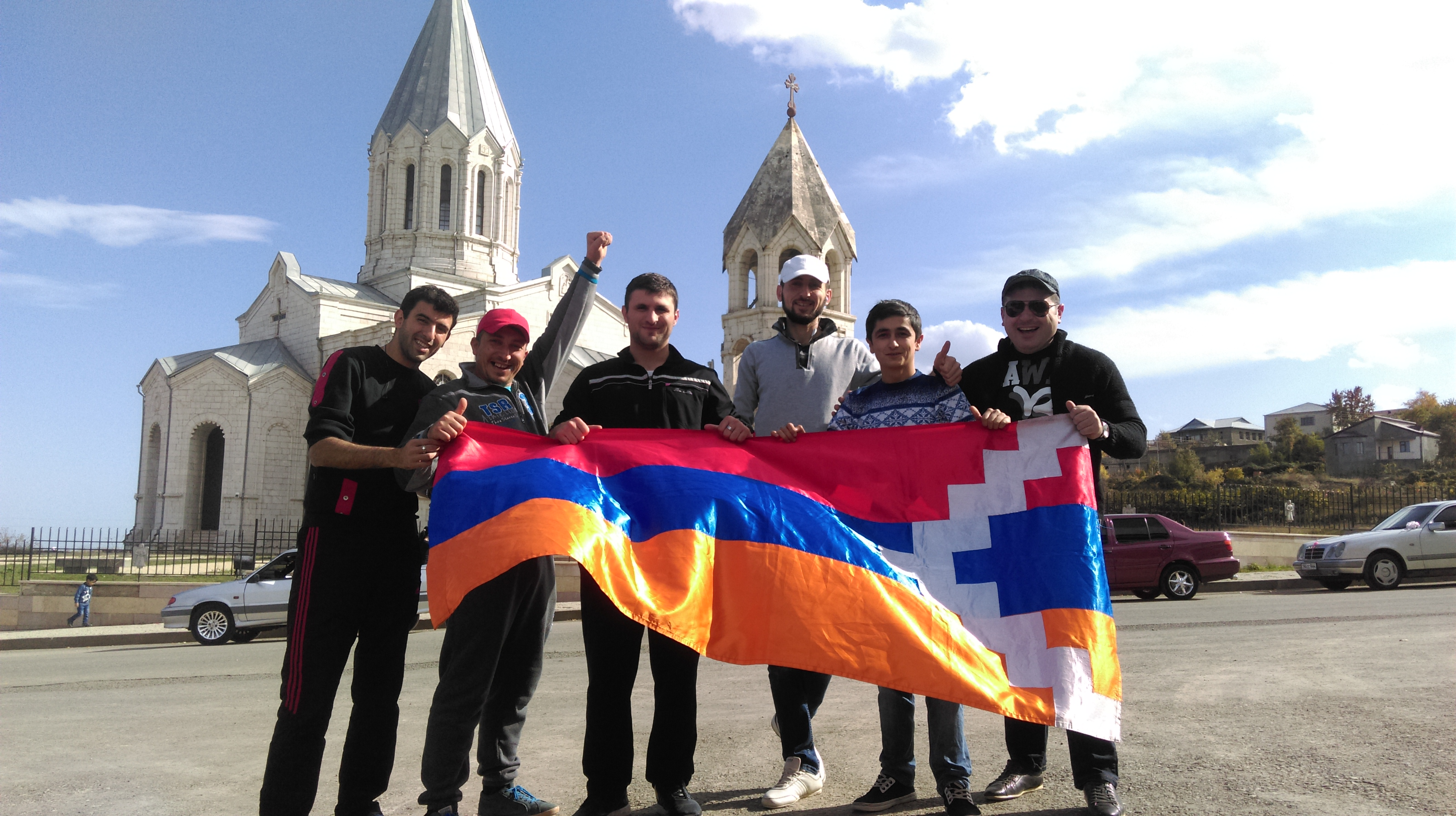

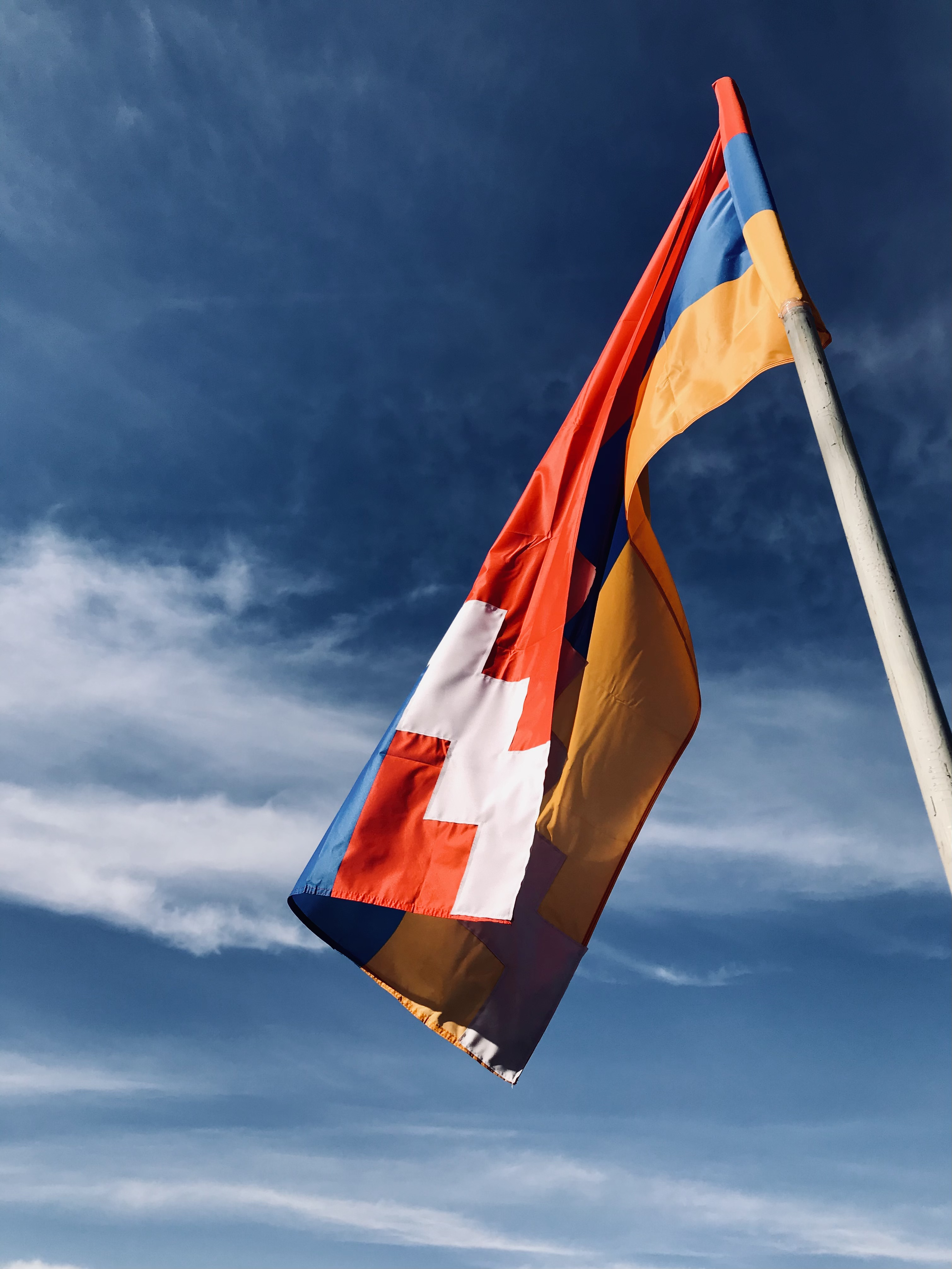

== See also ==
- Coat of arms of Artsakh
- Flag of Armenia
