= Hôtel de Ville, Garges-lès-Gonesse =

Town hall in Garges-lès-Gonesse, France

Hôtel de Ville
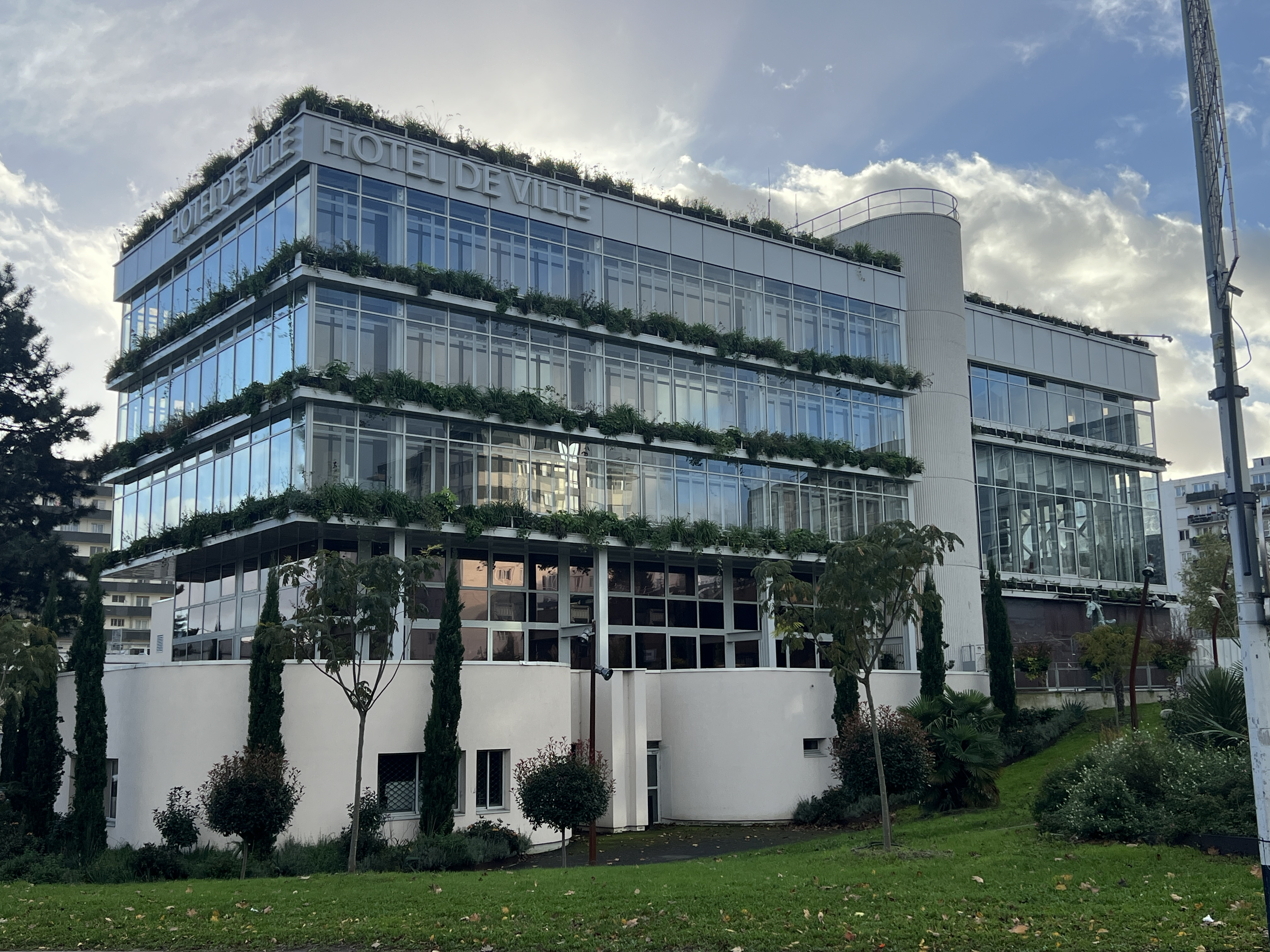
- The main frontage of the Hôtel de Ville in November 2023
- Interactive map of the Hôtel de Ville area

General information
- Type: City hall
- Architectural style: Brutalist style
- Location: Garges-lès-Gonesse, France
- Coordinates: 48.9717°N 2.4006°E
- Completed: 1975

Design and construction
- Architects: Pierre-Paul Heckly and Jack Moulin

The Hôtel de Ville (French pronunciation: [otɛl də vil], City Hall) is a municipal building in Garges-lès-Gonesse, Val-d'Oise, in the northern suburbs of Paris, standing on Place l'Hôtel de Ville.

== History ==
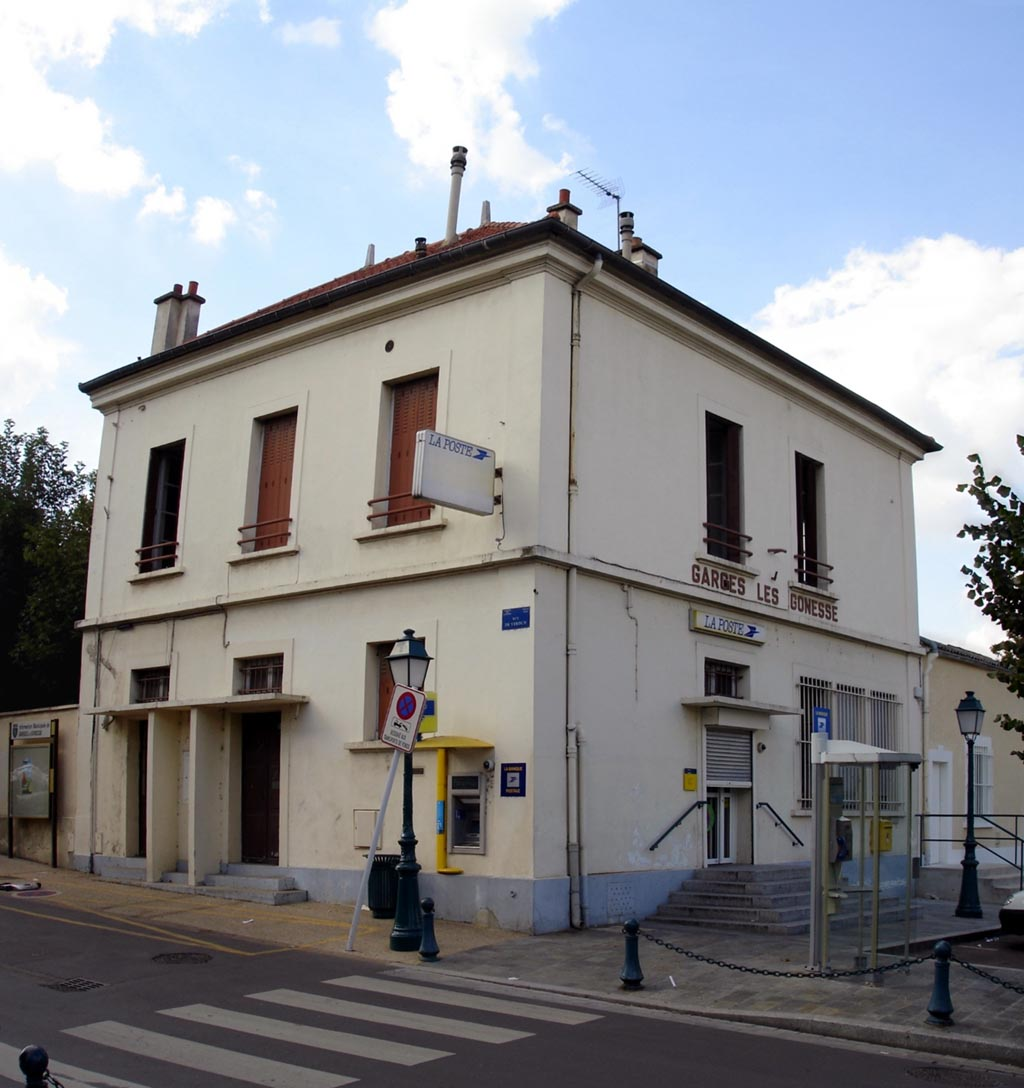
The first town hall

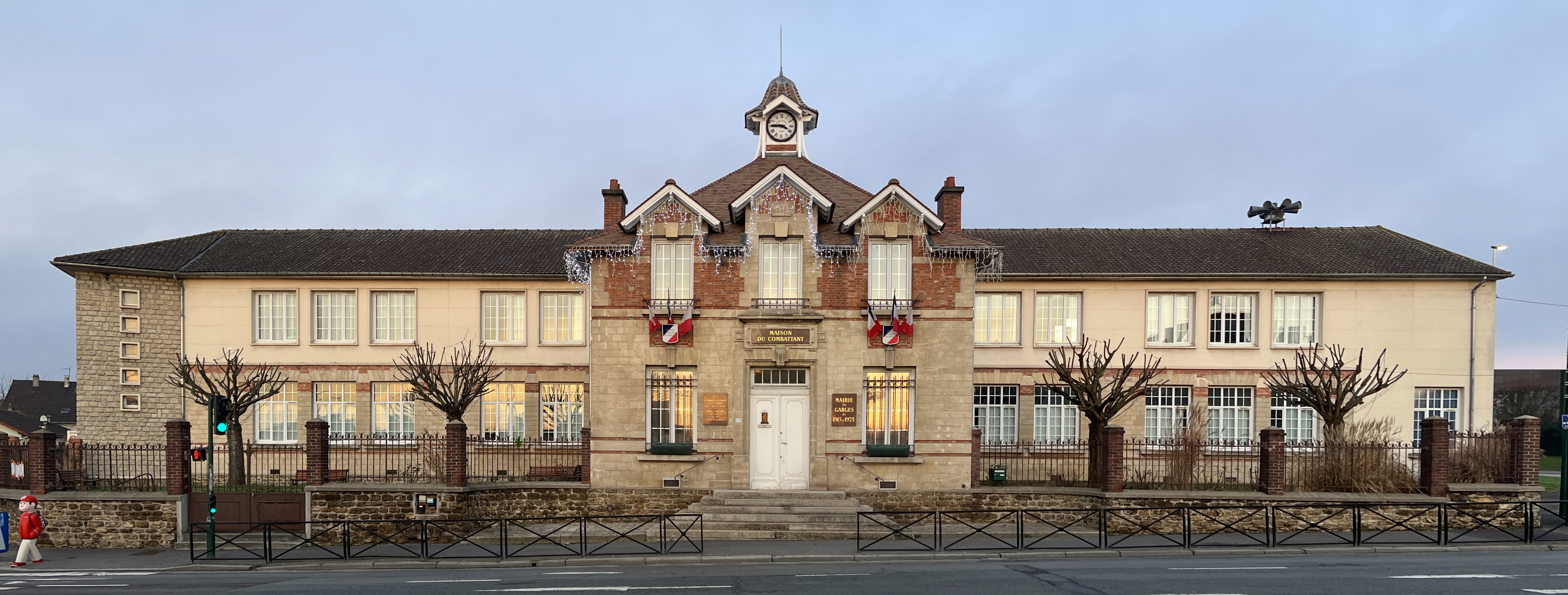
The second town hall

Following the French Revolution, meetings of the town council were initially held in the home of the mayor at the time. However, in the mid-19th century, the council established a town hall at the east end of Rue de Verdun. This building subsequently became a post office and later became a social and cultural centre.

In the early 20th century, following population growth, the council decided to commission a combined town hall and school. The site it selected, on the west side of what is now Rue de Stalingrad, formed part of the gardens of the local congregational girls' school. The building was designed in the neoclassical style, built in coursed stone with elements of red brick and was completed in 1913.

The design involved a symmetrical main frontage of 13 bays facing onto what is now Rue de Stalingrad. The central section of three bays, which was projected forward, featured a short flight of steps leading up to a square headed doorway with voussoirs and a keystone. It was flanked by a pair of casement windows. On the first floor, there were three dormer windows with keystones, and, at roof level, there was a small square clock tower with an ogee-shaped dome. The wings were fenestrated with casement windows. The building later became the local maison du combattants (veterans' house).

In the early 1970s, the town council decided to commission a modern town hall. The site they selected was in the heart of the new commercial centre of the town. The new building was designed by Pierre-Paul Heckly and Jack Moulin in the brutalist style, built in concrete and glass and was officially opened in 1975. The design involved a four-storey structure with a glass façade facing west onto a newly created square, Place l'Hôtel de Ville. Internally, the principal room was the Salle des Mariages (wedding room) on the first floor.

An extensive programme of refurbishment works was undertaken to a design by Safia Benayad-Cherif between September 2017 and May 2023. However, following the fatal shooting of Nahel Merzouk on 27 June 2023, there were riots across France and the ground floor of the town hall was badly damaged in an arson attack on the night of 28 June 2023. The damage was so severe that the council estimated the repairs would cost €2 million and take two years to complete.
