= Pierrefitte–Stains station =

Railway station in Pierrefitte-sur-Seine, France

Coordinates: 48.9636°N 2.3719°E

Pierrefitte–Stains
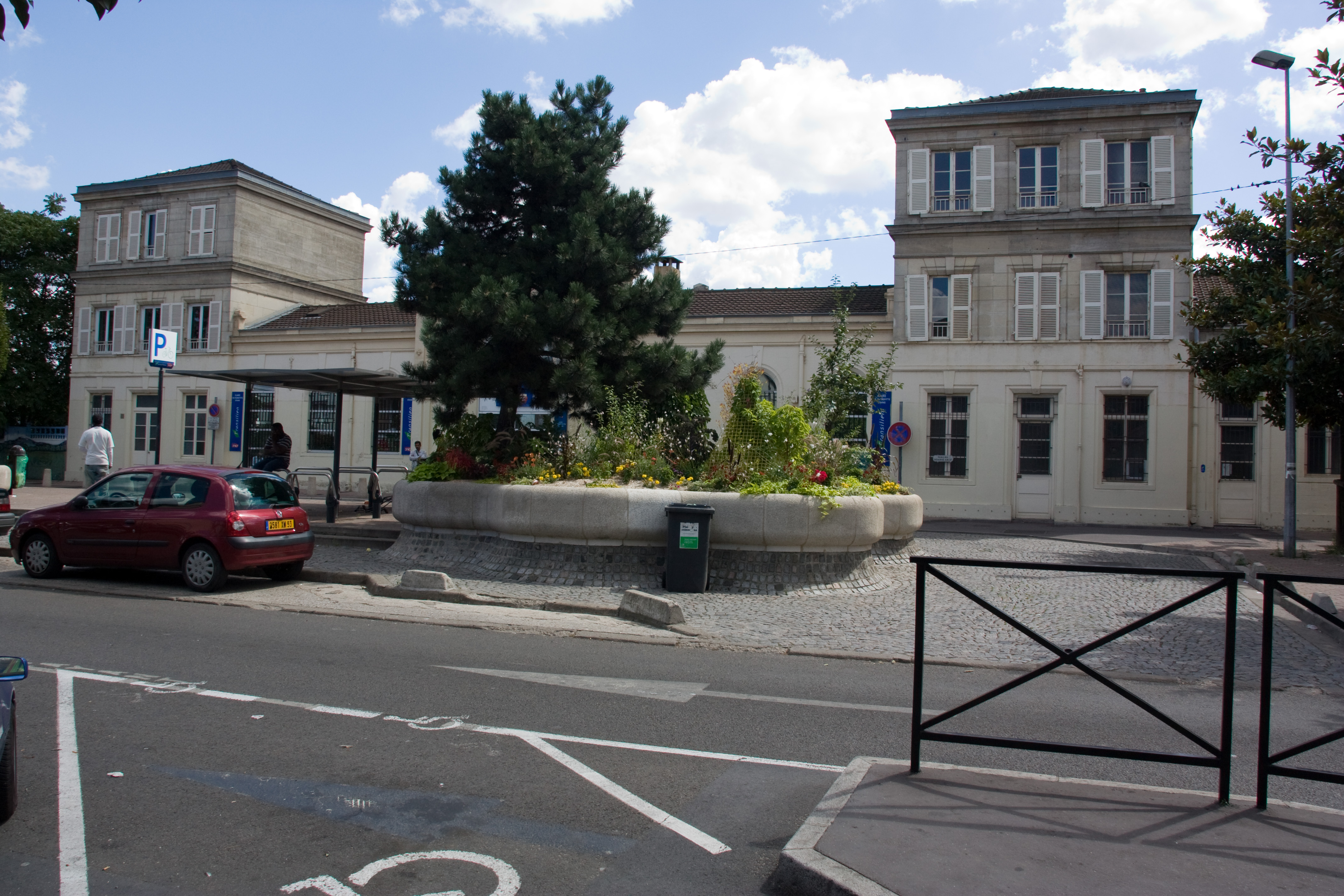

General information
- Location: 1 place du Général-Leclerc, Pierrefitte-sur-Seine; France
- Owner: SNCF
- Operator: SNCF
- Lines: RER D T11

Construction
- Accessible: Yes, by prior reservation

History
- Opened: 10 May 1859; 167 years ago

Passengers
- 2024: 14,163,490

Services
Preceding station	RER	Following station
Garges–Sarcelles towards Creil	RER D	Saint-Denis towards Melun or Malesherbes
Preceding station	Tram	Following station
Villetaneuse–Université towards Épinay-sur-Seine	T11	Stains–La Cerisaie towards Le Bourget
Location

Pierrefitte–Stains is a station in Pierrefitte-sur-Seine and near to Stains in the northern suburbs of Paris, in Seine-Saint-Denis department. It is situated on the RER D suburban railway line and the T11 Express.
