= Artsakhbank =

Armenian bank

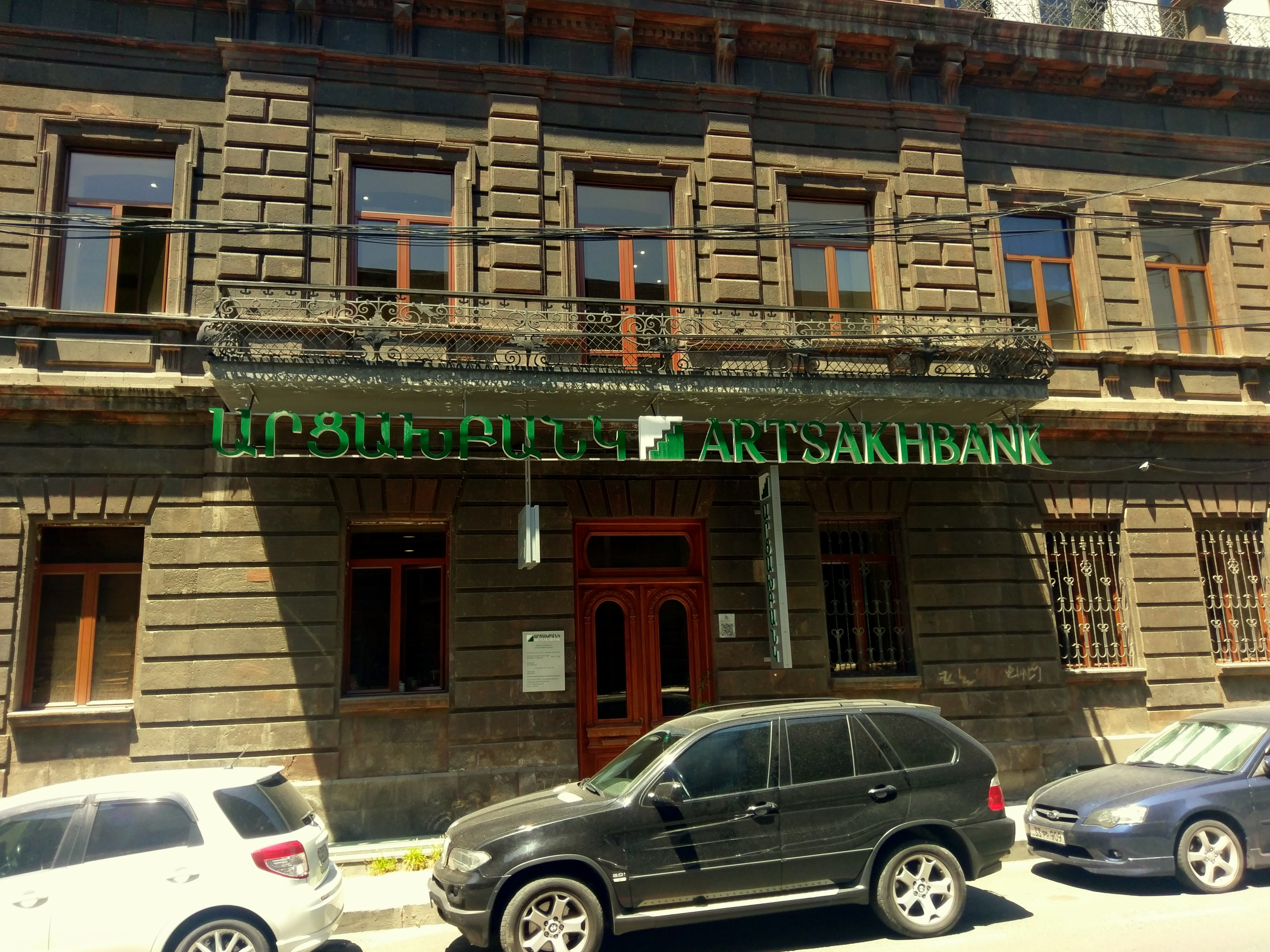
- Artsakhbank branch in Yerevan
- Type: Closed joint-stock company
- Industry: Banking
- Founded: 1996
- Headquarters: Yerevan, Armenia
- Key people: Kamo S. Nersisyan, Chairman of the Board
- Products: Financial services
- Total assets: ▲$145.2 million (2011)
- Total equity: ▲$24.7 million (2011)
- Number of employees: 373 (2023)
- Website: artsakhbank.am

Artsakhbank is an Armenian bank with headquarters in Yerevan. As of 31 August 2023, the bank had seven branches in Yerevan.

== History ==
The bank was established on 12 February 1996. On 6 November 1996 Artsakhbank Closed Joint-Stock Company (CJSC) was transformed into Artsakhbank Open Joint-Stock Company, according to the resolution of the bank's shareholders general meeting. On 24 June 2001, Artsakhbank OJSC, was reorganized back into Artsakhbank CJSC.

The bank is a shareholder of Armenian Card (ArCa) and a full member of ArCa, the Armenian national payment system, as well as a member of the Europay/MasterCard international payment system and a member of the SWIFT system.

Artsakhbank is a member of several international money transfer systems, such as MoneyGram, Migom, Leader, and Anelik. The bank has correspondent relations with 25 banks, both local and foreign.

== Operations ==
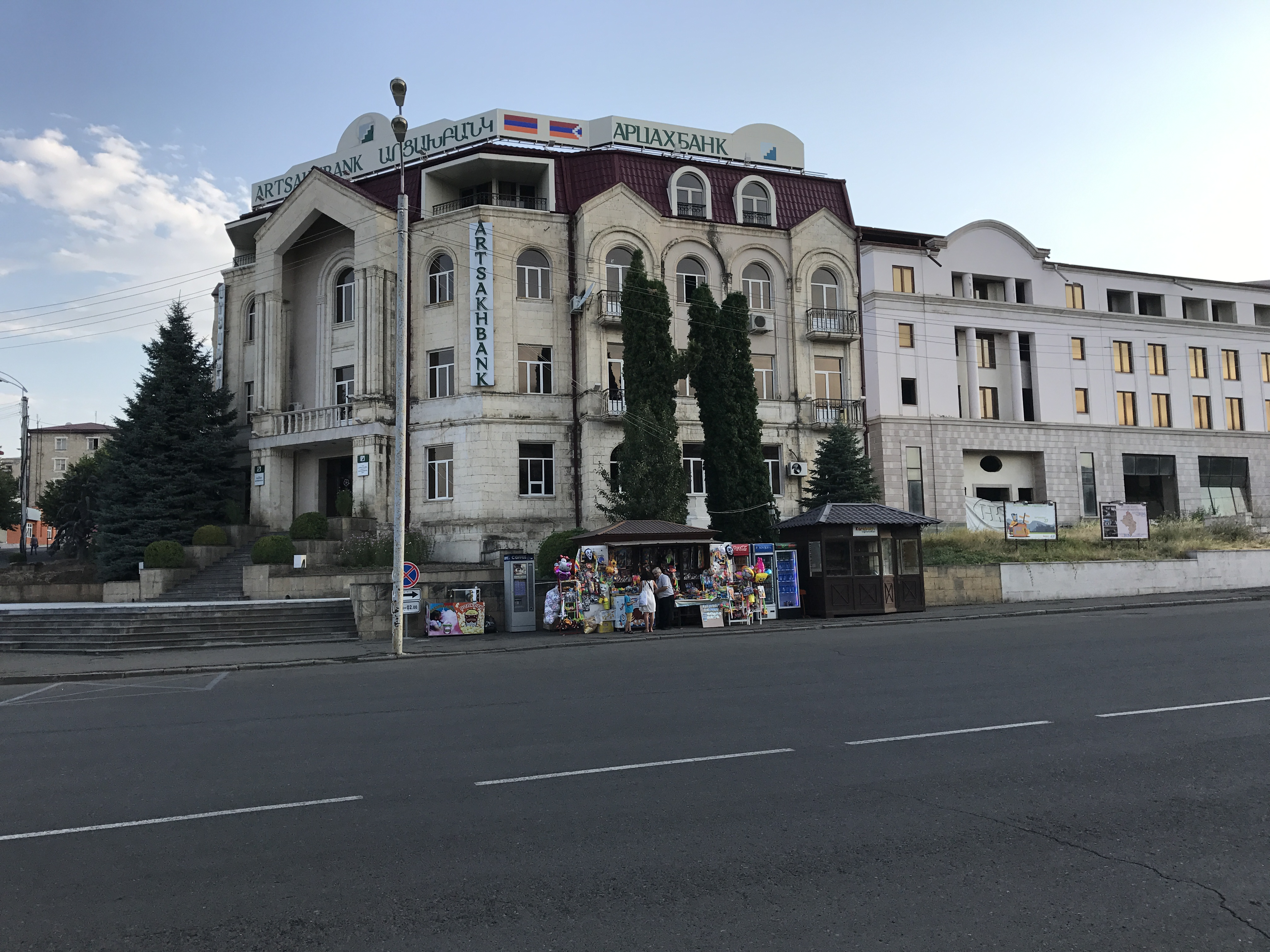
A former branch located in Stepanakert, Artsakh

The bank serves 43,787 customers, of which 41,427 are individuals.

The bank had 373 employees as of 31 August 2023. At that time, the bank's total equity came to ֏8.960358 billion (US$24.7 million), with total assets of ֏52.61811 billion ($145.2 million) and liabilities of ֏43.657752 billion ($120.5 million).

The bank also operated 11 branches across what was once the Republic of Artsakh until the Azerbaijani seizure of Artsakh's territory in 2023.

== See also ==
- Armenian dram
- List of banks in Armenia
- Economy of Armenia
- Economy of the Republic of Artsakh
