= Shekher =

Shekher Շեխեր Şexer
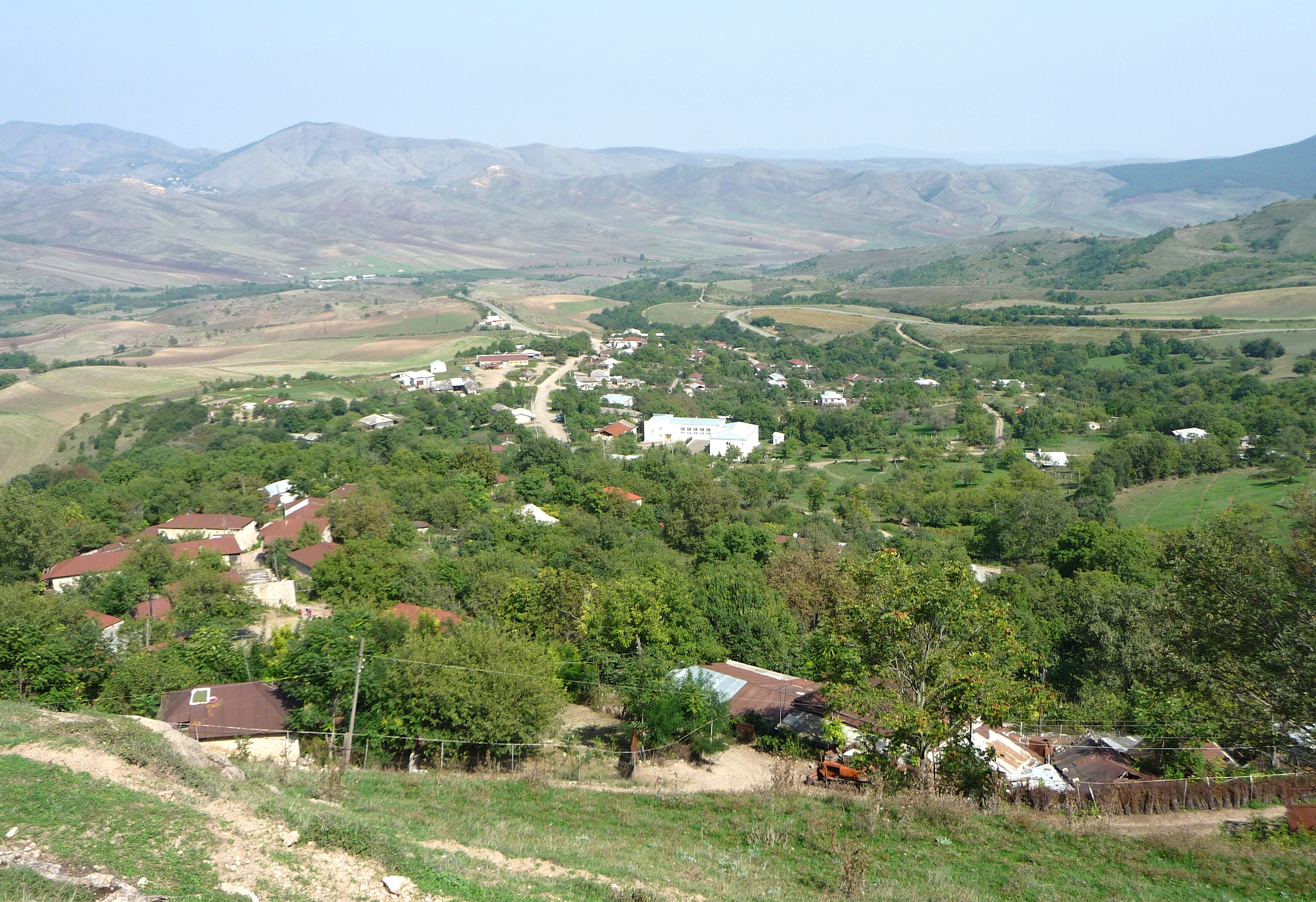

- Location within Azerbaijan
- Coordinates: 39°38′47″N 46°58′45″E
- Country: Azerbaijan
- District: Khojavend

Population (2015)
  - Total: 407
- Time zone: UTC+4 (AZT)

Shekher (Armenian: Շեխեր; Azerbaijani: Şexer) is a village in the Khojavend District of Azerbaijan, in the region of Nagorno-Karabakh. The village had an ethnic Armenian-majority population in 1989.

== History ==
During the Soviet period, the village was part of the Martuni District of the Nagorno-Karabakh Autonomous Oblast within the Azerbaijan Soviet Socialist Republic. After the First Nagorno-Karabakh War, the village was administrated as part of the Martuni Province of the breakaway Republic of Artsakh. The village came under the control of Azerbaijan on 9 November 2020, during the 2020 Nagorno-Karabakh war.

== Historical heritage sites ==
Historical heritage sites in and around the village include the church of Surb Vardan (Armenian: Սուրբ Վարդան), the 16th/17th-century shrine of Pir Bab (Armenian: Փիր բաբ) with an adjacent khachkar, and two 17th-century khachkars.

== Demographics ==
Prior to the 2020 Nagorno-Karabakh war, it had an Armenian majority with 408 inhabitants in 2005, and 407 inhabitants in 2015.

== Partnerships ==
In October 2018, the village signed a friendship declaration with the Commune of Arnouville, France. In June 2019, the French administrative court of Cergy-Pontoise declared that the signing breached French law by exceeding the authority of a municipal jurisdiction and by not respecting the international commitments of France (notably Nagorno-Karabakh's lack of recognition as a state), proclaiming the declaration null and void.
