= Azat Artsakh =

Republic of Artsakh

Azat Artsakh (Ազատ Արցախ in Armenian meaning "Free Artsakh) is the official newspaper of the Republic of Artsakh published in Armenian. It was established on 16 June 1923.

The paper had been known under several names, initially as Geghtchouk (Գեղջուկ in Armenian, meaning "Villager"). The name was changed to Khorherdayin Karabakh (Խորհրդային Ղարաբաղ - meaning "Soviet Karabakh"), and much later to Artsakh (Արցախ in Armenian, Artsakh being the Armenian equivalent for Karabakh), and with the establishment of Nagorno-Karabakh Republic, it was renamed Mountainous Karabakh Republic (ԼՂ Հանրապետություն in Armenian) and, then, finally renamed Azat Artsakh.

The newspaper also has online edition in Armenian, Russian and English.

== See also ==
- List of newspapers in Nagorno-Karabakh
