= Arnouville =

- Commune
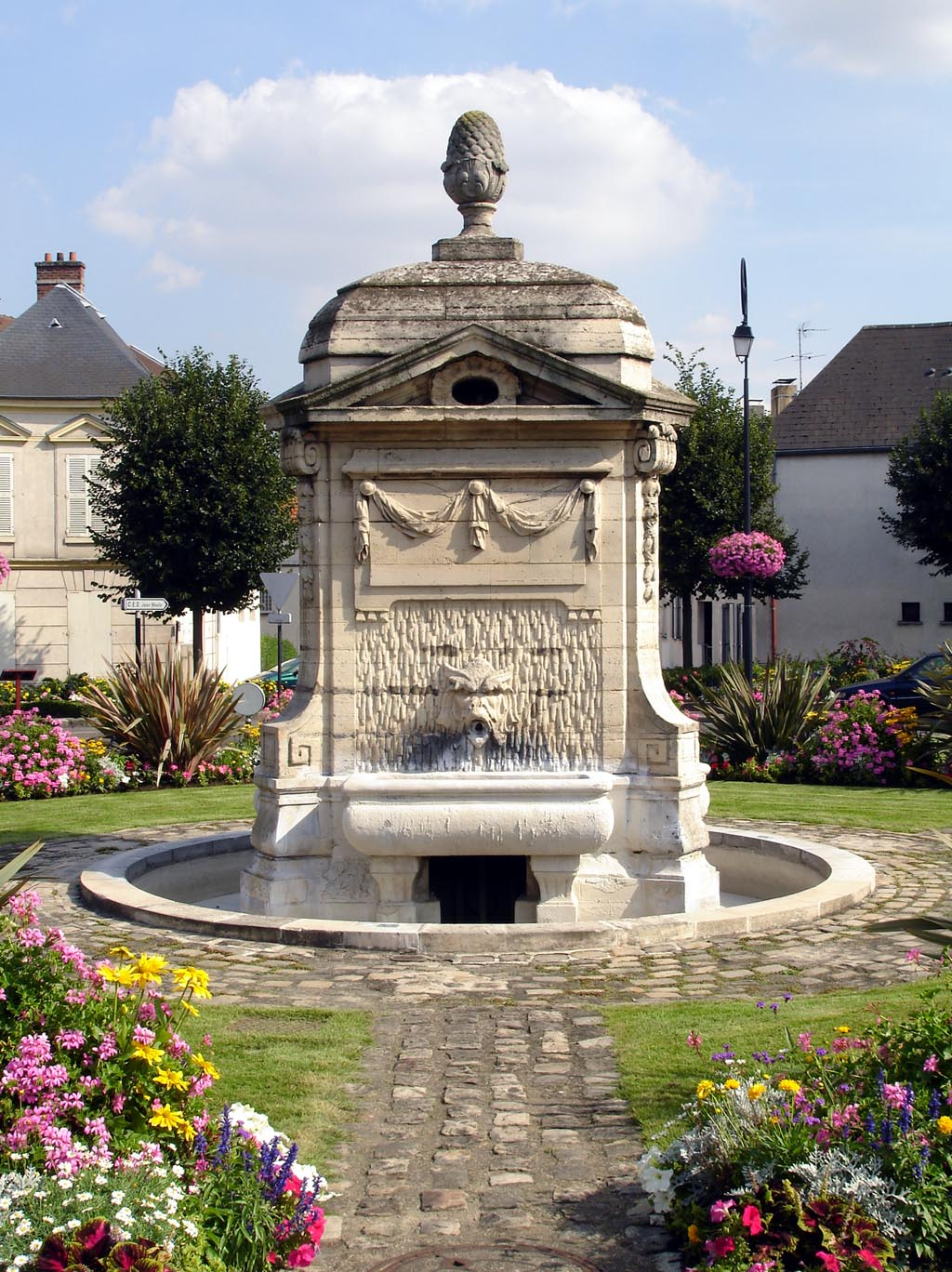
- La Fontaine

- Coat of arms
- Location of Arnouville
- Location within France Location within Île-de-France (region)
- Coordinates: 48°59′16″N 2°25′03″E
- Country: France
- Region: Île-de-France
- Department: Val-d'Oise
- Arrondissement: Sarcelles
- Canton: Garges-lès-Gonesse
- Intercommunality: CA Roissy Pays France

Government
  - Mayor (2020–2026): Pascal Doll
- Area^{1}: 2.84 km^{2} (1.10 sq mi)
- Population (2023): 15,023
  - Density: 5,290/km^{2} (13,700/sq mi)
- Time zone: UTC+01:00 (CET)
  - Summer (DST): UTC+02:00 (CEST)
- INSEE/Postal code: 95019 /95400
- ^{1} French Land Register data, which excludes lakes, ponds, glaciers > 1 km^{2} (0.386 sq mi or 247 acres) and river estuaries.

Arnouville (French pronunciation: [aʁnuvil]) is a commune in the Val-d'Oise department in Île-de-France in northern France. Previously known as Arnouville-lès-Gonesse (French pronunciation: [aʁnuvil lɛ ɡɔnɛs], lit. 'Arnouville near Gonesse'), the commune was officially renamed to Arnouville on 11 July 2010.

== Population ==
Historical population

Year	Pop.	±% p.a.
1793	340	—
1821	273	−0.78%
1846	281	+0.12%
1872	394	+1.31%
1901	519	+0.95%
1911	909	+5.76%
1921	1,677	+6.32%
1926	4,020	+19.11%
1931	6,285	+9.35%
1936	6,879	+1.82%
1946	6,552	−0.49%

Year	Pop.	±% p.a.
1954	7,932	+2.42%
1962	10,227	+3.23%
1968	11,114	+1.40%
1975	11,085	−0.04%
1982	10,530	−0.73%
1990	12,223	+1.88%
1999	12,291	+0.06%
2007	13,215	+0.91%
2012	13,979	+1.13%
2017	14,227	+0.35%
2023	15,023	+0.91%

Source: EHESS and INSEE (1968–2023)

== Education ==
Public primary schools in the commune:

- Preschools (écoles maternelles): Victor Hugo, Anna Fabre, Charles Perrault, and Claude Demange
- Elementary schools: Victor Hugo, Danielle Casanova, Jean Jaurès, and Jean Monnet

The commune also has a junior high school, Collège Jean Moulin, and a vocational high school, Lycée d’Enseignement Professionnel Virginia Henderson. Lycée René Cassin, a general high school/sixth-form college, is in nearby Gonesse.

The private school network École Saint-Didier has its junior high division, Collège Saint Didier, in Arnouville, while the primary division is in Villiers-le-Bel.

== Partnerships ==
The Commune has a Friendship Declaration with the village of Şəkər, Khojavend, of the de facto independent Nagorno-Karabakh Republic (which is de jure part of Azerbaijan). In June 2019, the French administrative court of Cergy-Pontoise declared that the signing breached French law by exceeding the authority of a municipal jurisdiction and by not respecting the international commitments of France (notably Nagorno-Karabakh's lack of recognition as a state), proclaiming the declaration null and void.

== See also ==
- Communes of the Val-d'Oise department
