= Grigny to Corbeil-Essonnes line =

Railroad line located in Essonne, department in France

Plateau d'Évry-Courcouronnes Line
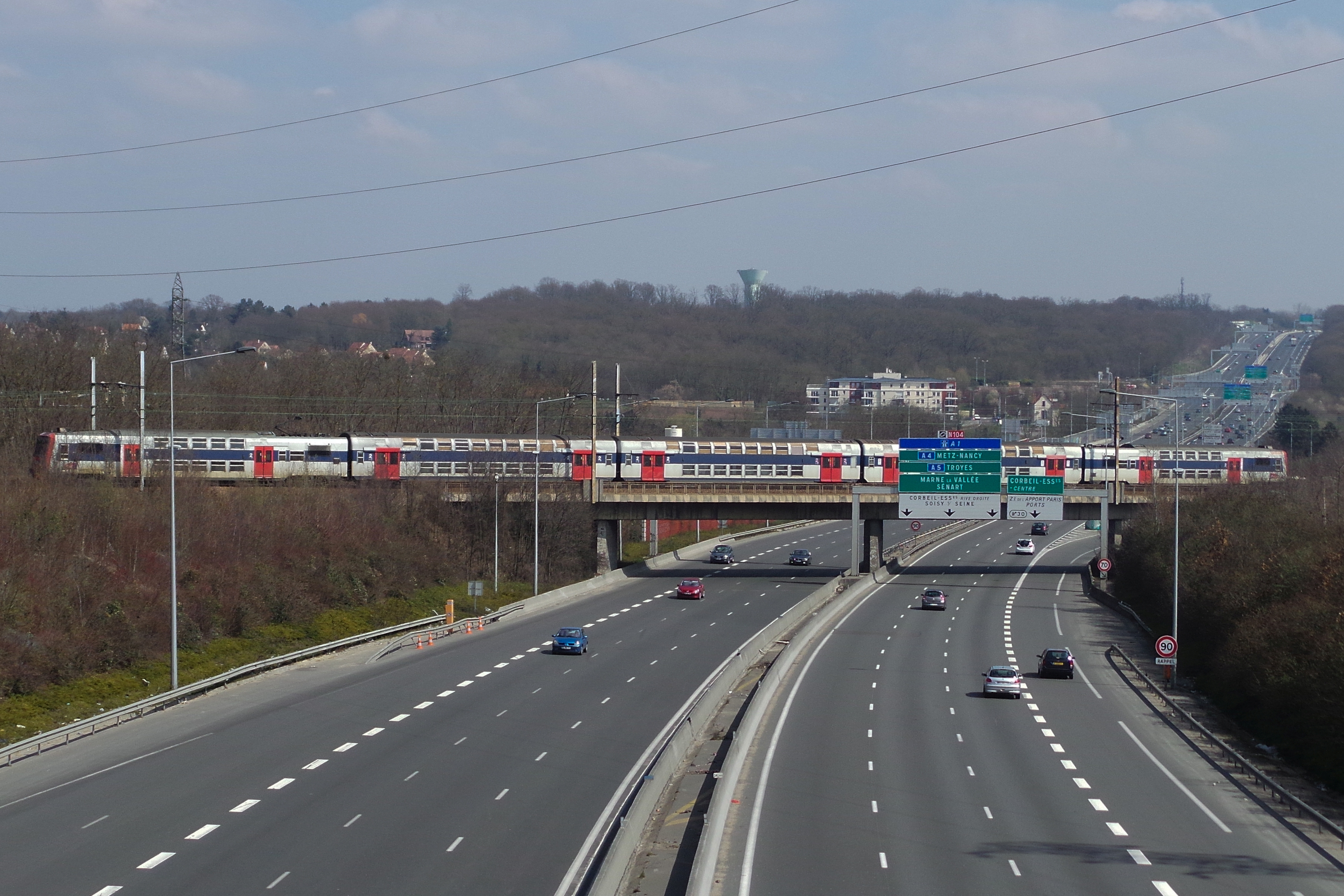
- Railway bridge over the Francilienne.

Overview
- Other name: Grigny to Corbeil-Essonnes Line
- Native name: Ligne du plateau d'Évry-Courcouronnes
- Owner: SNCF
- Locale: Île-de-France, France
- Termini: Grigny; Corbeil-Essonnes
- Stations: 5

Service
- Operator: SNCF

History
- Opened: 1974 – 1975

Technical
- Line length: 10.7 km (6.6 mi)
- Number of tracks: 2
- Character: Suburban rail
- Track gauge: 1,435 mm (4 ft 8 1/2 in) standard gauge
- Electrification: 1.5 kV DC overhead line
- Signalling: ABS
Route map
988000 - Ligne de Grigny à Corbeil-Essonnes.png

The Grigny to Corbeil-Essonnes or Plateau d'Évry line is a double-track, standard-gauge railroad line ten kilometers long located in the French department of Essonne, in the Île-de-France region. It serves the various districts of the new town of Évry. It is the first new passenger line built by the Société nationale des chemins de fer français (SNCF) since its creation in 1938. It forms line no. 988,000 of the national rail network.

Opened in two stages in 1974 and 1975, the line runs in parallel to—but is longer and more winding than—the line from Villeneuve-Saint-Georges to Montargis via Corbeil, known as the “ligne de la vallée,” to which it is connected at both ends. It is one of the main southern branches of RER line D and carries only fairly heavy commuter traffic. Although theoretically equivalent to the historic route through the Seine Valley, traffic restrictions on certain types of engines limit their use by non-RER traffic to a few exceptional detours. There are no level crossings.

== History ==
=== Chronology ===
- February 16, 1974, the opening of the Grigny-Centre station, operated as a branch line;
- December 6, 1975, the opening of the entire line.

=== Serving the new town of Évry ===
The line from Grigny to Corbeil-Essonnes is the first new passenger line built by the Société nationale des chemins de fer français (SNCF). In fact, since its creation in 1938, the new works of the national railway company had, until that time, only involved adaptations, reconstructions, or the creation of significant marshaling yards, but no new line sections.

In the late 1960s, the decision was taken to build the Plateau line to support the development of the new town of Évry, built on a plateau overlooking the left bank of the Seine. The town was chosen to become the prefecture of the new Essonne department, created by the dismantling of the former Seine and Seine-et-Oise departments. The scale of the housing development planned for the communes of Grigny, Ris-Orangis, Courcouronnes, and Évry meant that an efficient rail link was essential.

The first project in the special SNCF program, the preliminary design was taken into account by the Paris transport authority in January 1970. But without waiting for the declaration of public utility, which was signed on May 16, 1972, the Minister of Transport authorized emergency execution on September 7, 1971. Work began immediately under the supervision of a GET (Groupe d'Études Travaux) belonging to the Equipment Division of the Paris-Sud-Est region.

The line was designed to avoid any nuisance to future residents, with a mostly trench route, partly covered at several points along the way. Twenty-eight road bridges had to be built over the trench, some to re-establish existing routes, others to establish new links linked to the new town project. Some of the bridges built at the time have still not been put to use thirty years later (e.g. a bridge in Évry between the Évry-Courcouronnes and Bras de Fer stations), as the original plans have since evolved.

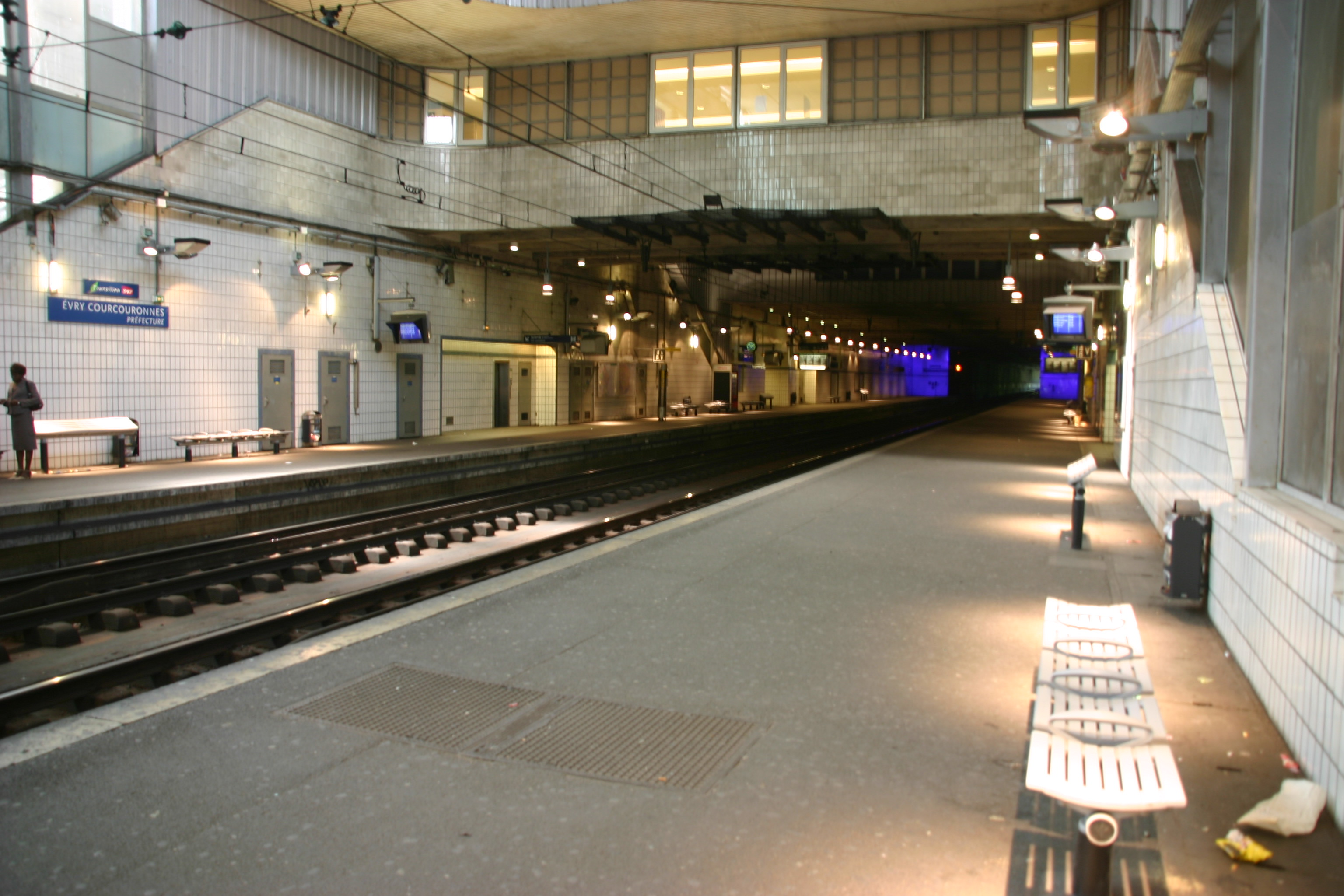
The platforms of Évry-Courcouronnes station.

The route involved digging a tunnel at Grigny, building access ramps at both ends (embankments to the north and viaducts to the south), and clearing a long trench across the plateau where the new town was to be built. Four stations were built “ex nihilo,” three of them semi-buried, and one, Orangis-Bois de l'Épine, in the open air. They are equipped with parking lots and modern facilities such as remote car sharing and escalators.

The project also entails major changes to the valley line to which it connects at both ends. To the north, a new junction is created at the line's origin at Grigny-Val de Seine and several modifications are made to Juvisy station, a major transfer point for the southern suburbs. A track and platform were removed to lengthen the track to 315 meters for twelve-car trains, an underpass was built, and a small all-relay soft-transit signal box (PRS) was installed in station 1, to remotely control the new bifurcation. To the south, the new line imposes major changes on the facilities at Corbeil-Essonnes station. A train storage platform was built, and a single PRS was put into service on October 19, 1975.

Work was slowed by difficult terrain and urban planning constraints, but proceeded rapidly. The line went into service in two stages. On February 16, 1974, a first section was opened as far as Grigny-Centre station, operated as a branch line with a temporary terminus on track 2. The remainder of the line was energized on November 28, 1975, and opened to the public on December 6, 1975. The new line immediately enjoyed high ridership.

== Features ==
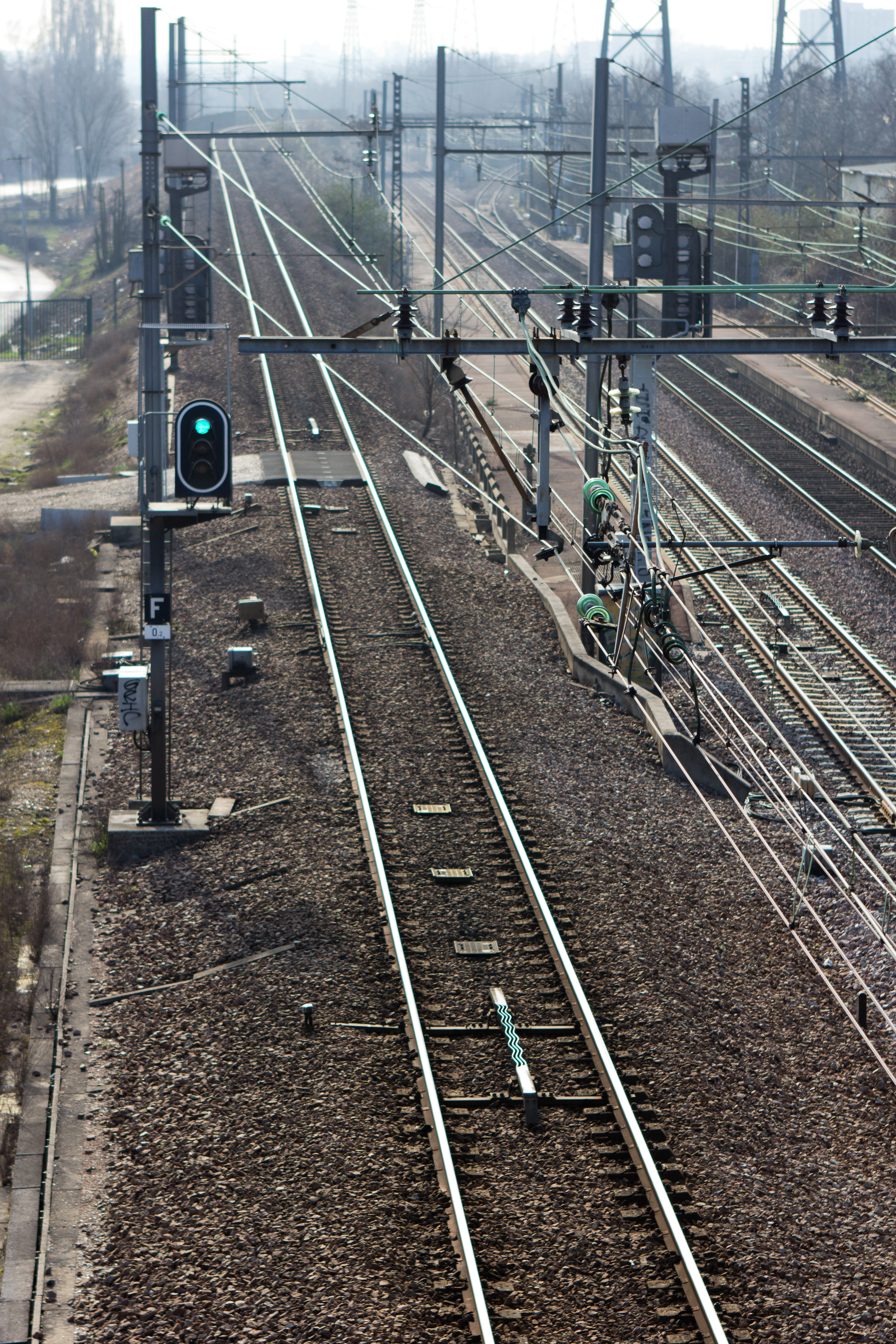
Ramp allowing the line from Corbeil to be crossed without shearing.

Video in the driver's cab from Viry-Châtillon to Grigny-Centre. The Z 20500 train leaves the valley line and enters the plateau line at the old Grigny-Val-de-Seine station.

=== Route ===
Ten kilometers long, the plateau line branches off from the line from Villeneuve-Saint-Georges to Montargis via Corbeil, known as the valley line, at the level of the former Grigny-Val-de-Seine station, now abandoned. A grade separation allows track 1 of the line to cross without shearing track 2 coming from Corbeil via the valley.

After crossing the Route Nationale 7, a ramped embankment leads to the Grigny-Centre station. This station is half open-air, and half underground. The line leaves the station via the Grigny tunnel, also a ramp, which opens into a trench close to the A6 autoroute. It remains in a trench for most of the rest of the route. This layout was chosen at the time of construction in anticipation of future urbanization.

While the Orangis-Bois de l'Épine station is in the open air, the stations at Évry-Courcouronnes and Bras de Fer, on the other hand, are cut-and-covered, taking on the appearance of underground stations. At the southern edge of the Évry plateau, the line descends to Corbeil-Essonnes station via a long viaduct spanning the Francilienne before joining the valley line.

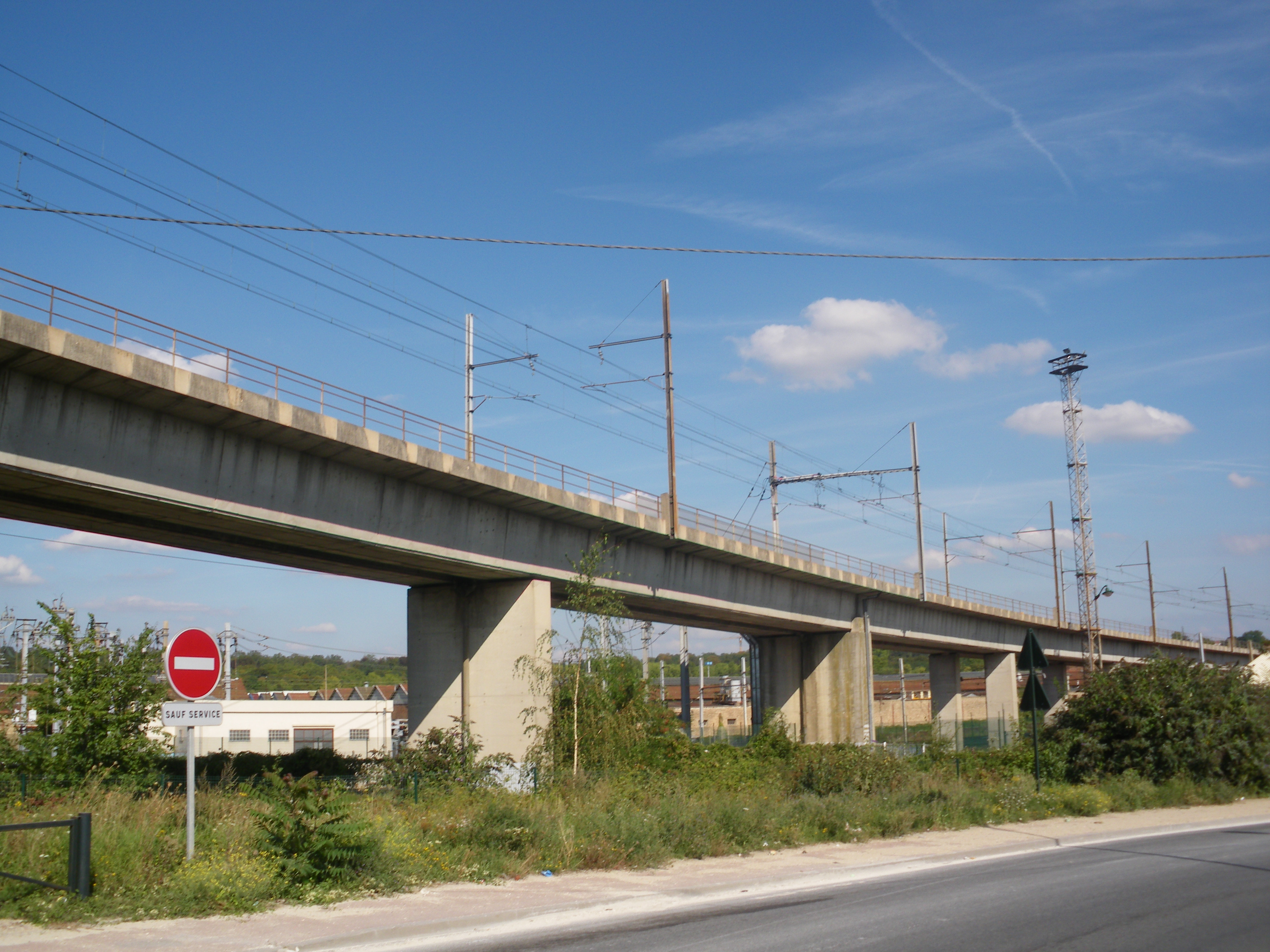
Corbeil-Essonnes flyover which spans the tracks of the Villeneuve-Saint-Georges to Montargis line.

=== Engineering structures ===
The main engineering structures on the route are the Grigny tunnel (805 m), the bridge over the RN7 (59 m), the bridge over the Francilienne (133 m), and the Corbeil viaduct (395 m). This viaduct, with a gradient of 20%, is made up of three parts: a 341.20 m long flying junction over the tracks of the “la vallée” line, a 96 m long station and a 232.25 m long enclosure.

The line also features 23 bridges, 9 over and 14 under.

=== Equipment ===
The double-track line is equipped with a permanent counter-current system (IPCS). (Note: The valley line is also equipped with a permanent counter-sense facility (IPCS).) Like the entire Paris-Lyon suburban network, it is electrified with 1.5 kV direct current, with a substation at kilometer point 3.6 (Pilatre substation) and another at Corbeil-Tarterêts; it is equipped with an automatic block signaling (ABS), speed control by beacons (KVB) and a ground-to-train radio link without data transmission.

== Operations ==
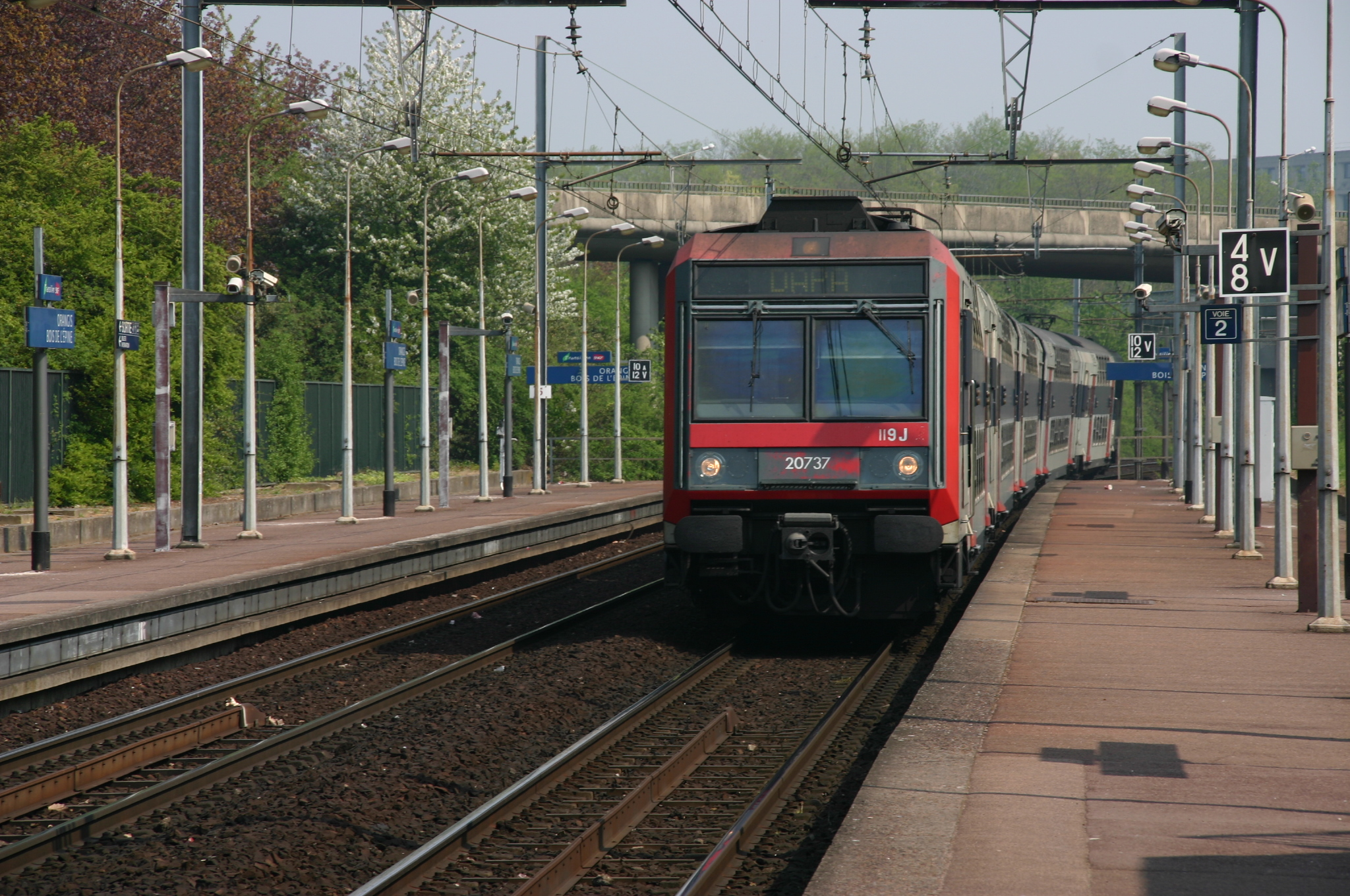
A Z 20500 train carrying out the “DAPA” mission arrives at Orangis-Bois de l'Épine station.

The line is operated by SNCF as part of RER line D and under the Transilien label.

The line's difficult longitudinal profile is not conducive to freight traffic, which is prohibited. There are curves with a minimum radius of 600 meters, and steep gradients of 15 ‰ in the north-south direction, and 20 ‰ in the other direction, on the long viaduct climb from Corbeil. These features limit the speed to 100 km/h (originally 120 km/h). Three types of passenger rolling stock are used: Z 5300 railcars from the outset, Z 5600s, and, more generally since then, Z 20500s.

In 1974, a Z 5300 trainset split and grouped at Juvisy with trains running from Paris to Melun via Corbeil, provided service to Grigny on a quarter-hourly basis at peak times and on a half-hourly basis at off-peak times. When the section was fully opened in 1975, the line was served by trains linking it directly to Paris-Lyon, with one train per quarter-hour at peak times and one train per half-hour at off-peak times. Since December 14, 2008, trains have been running to and from Malesherbes, La Ferté-Alais, Melun, Corbeil-Essonnes, Juvisy, Paris-Gare-de-Lyon, Châtelet-Les Halles, Stade-de-France-Saint-Denis, Villiers-le-Bel-Gonesse-Arnouville, Goussainville or Orry-la-Ville-Coye. All trains on the Plateau line are omnibus, with some trains running directly between Villeneuve-Saint-Georges and Paris-Gare-de-Lyon.

The average journey time between Viry-Châtillon and Corbeil-Essonnes is sixteen minutes, while the average journey time from Paris-Lyon to Corbeil via the plateau is thirty-seven to forty-four minutes, depending on whether trains are semi-direct or omnibus. The entire line is located in Zone 5 of the Île-de-France public transport pricing system, Viry-Châtillon being the last station in Zone 4.

Daily passenger numbers ranged from 7,500 to 15,000, depending on the stop, in 2003, the most important of which was Évry-Courcouronnes station, a significant transfer point with around 15,000 passengers a day.

== Gallery ==
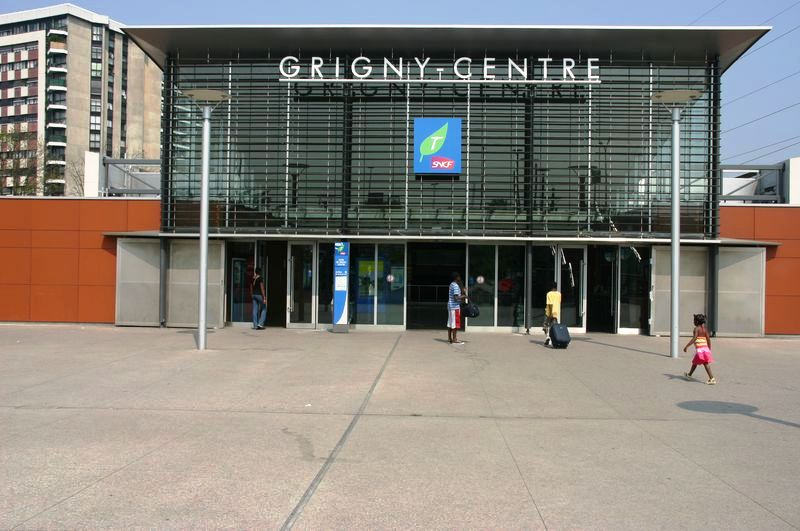
Grigny-Center.

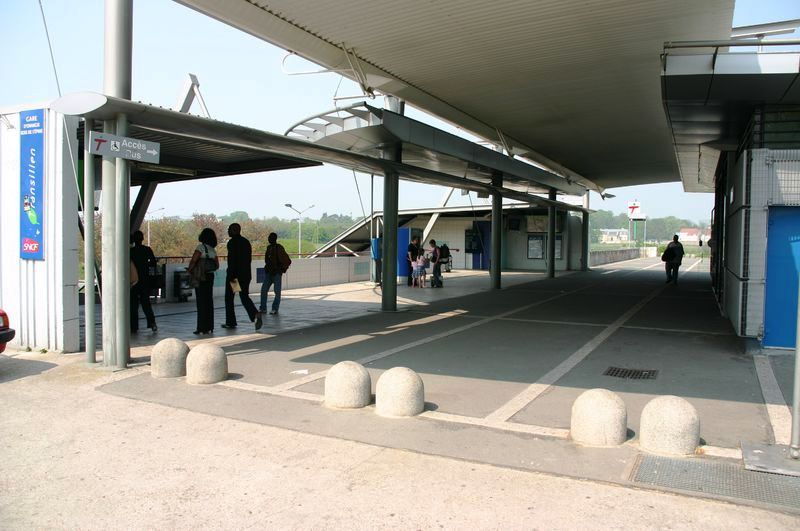
Orangis-Bois de l'Épine.

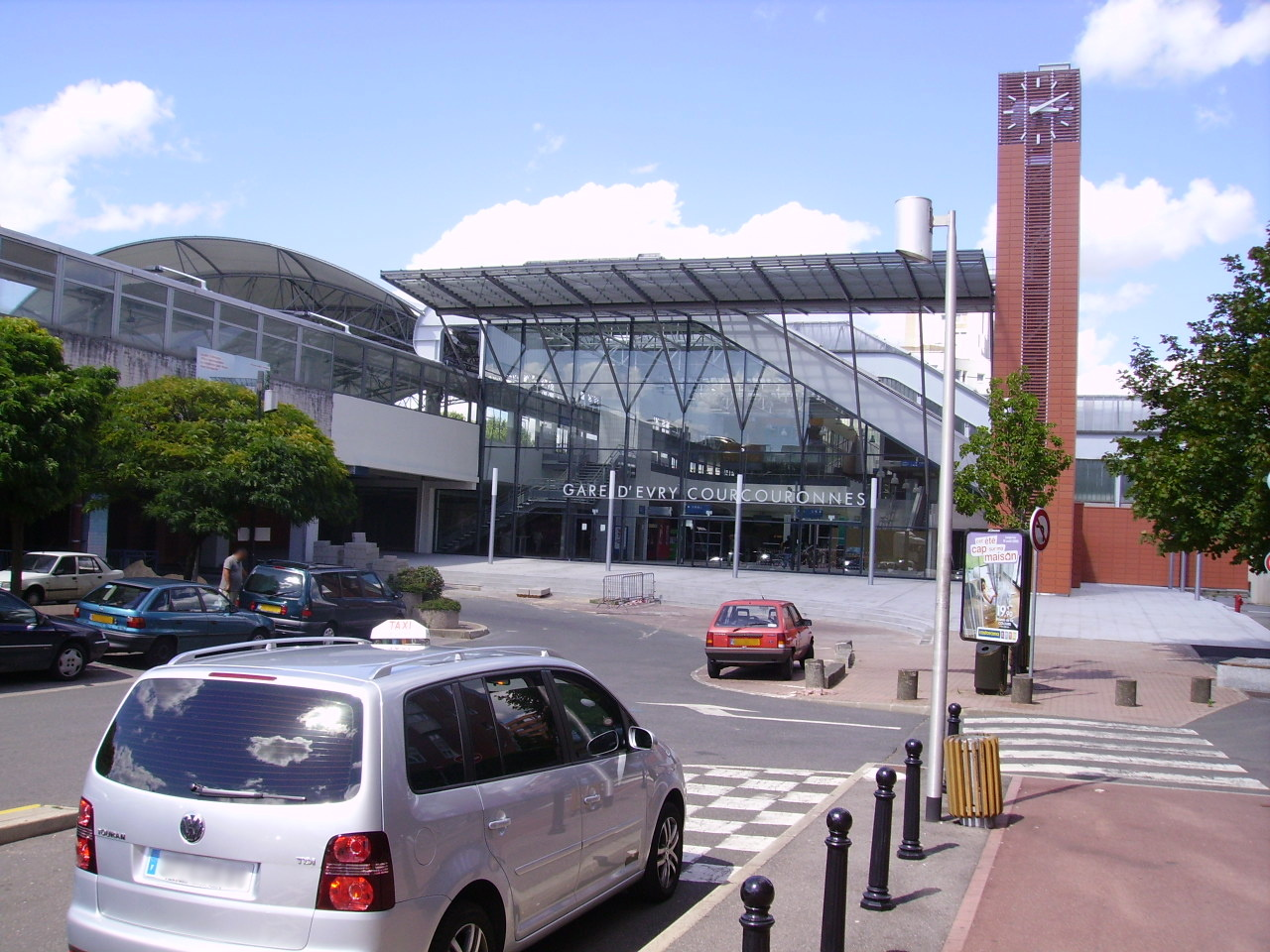
Evry-Courcouronnes Center.

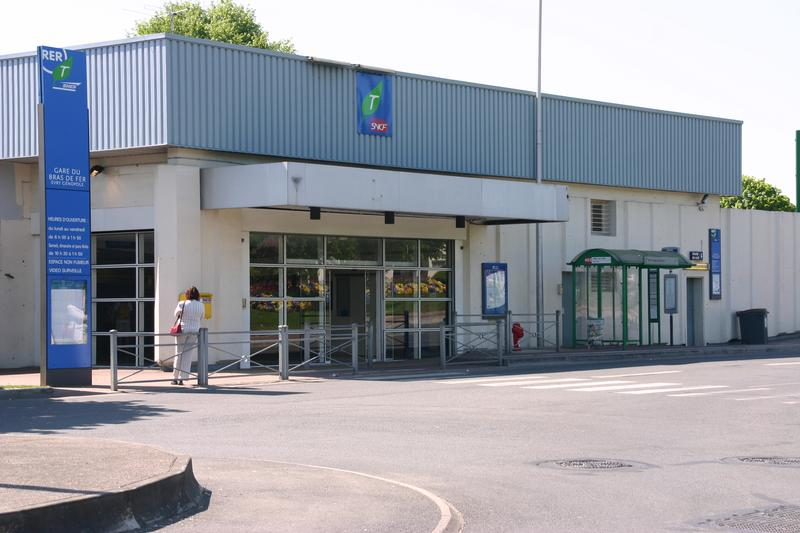
Bras de Fer-Évry-Génopole.

== See also ==
- List of railway lines in France

== Bibliography ==
- Carrière, Bruno (1997). Les trains de banlieue, t. 1 : De 1837 à 1938 [Suburban trains, vol. 1: From 1837 to 1938] (in French). Tours: La Vie du rail. p. 303.
- Collardey, Bernard (1999). Les trains de banlieue, t. II : De 1938 à 1999 [Suburban trains, vol. II: From 1938 to 1999] (in French). Paris: La Vie du rail. p. 335. ISBN 2-902808-76-3.
- Douté, Reinhard (2011). Les 400 profils de lignes voyageurs du réseau français : lignes 601 à 990 [The 400 passenger line profiles of the French network: lines 601 to 990] (in French). Vol. 2. La Vie du rail. p. 212. ISBN 978-2-918758-44-0.
