= Malesherbes =

Malesherbes may refer to:

- Guillaume-Chrétien de Lamoignon de Malesherbes (1721–1794); French statesman, lawyer and defender of King Louis XVI
- Guillaume de Lamoignon de Blancmesnil (1683—1772); seigneur de Blancmesnil et de Malesherbes; father of Guillame-Chrétien, politician and statesman
- Malesherbes station (Paris Metro), on Boulevard Malesherbes
- Malesherbes, Loiret; commune in France
  - Malesherbes station (Paris RER), railway station serving Malesherbes, Loiret
- SC Malesherbes; French football club

== See also ==
- Louis Malesherbes Goldsborough (1805–1877) U.S. Admiral
