= René Cagnat =

French historian (1852–1937)

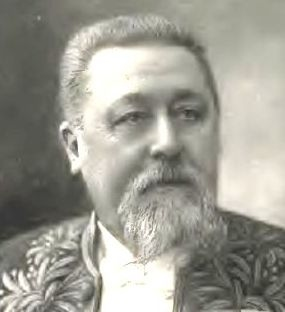
- Cagnat in 1920
- Born: René Louis Victor Cagnat; 10 October 1852
- Died: 27 March 1937 (aged 84); Paris
- Occupations: Historian; Epigrapher
- Spouse: Geneviève Hauvette (1857–1935)

René Cagnat (10 October 1852 – 27 March 1937) was a French historian, a specialist of Latin epigraphy and history of North Africa during Antiquity.

== Biography ==
On the death of his father, Léon Renier, a friend of the family, supported his education. Under the influence of Ernest Desjardins, he became interested in epigraphy. Agrégé de grammaire in 1876, he led an archaeological campaign in Tunisia and became professor of epigraphy in 1883.

From 1880, René Cagnat devoted his first scientific work in 1882 on municipal militias as well as indirect taxes in the Roman Empire. In 1885 he published his famous Cours d'épigraphie latine which had several editions. His most lasting achievement was the creation in 1888 of the journal L'Année épigraphique, in which epigraphy reports, previously widely dispersed, were collected and published. In carrying out this task, he was assisted by Jean-Guillaume Feignon, his deputy epigrapher. By the 1880s, Cagnat focused especially on the inscriptions in North Africa. At the request of Theodor Mommsen, he studied, first with Johannes Schmidt then with Hermann Dessau, these inscriptions for the Corpus Inscriptionum Latinarum.

In the 1890s, the French government entrusted him with the monitoring of North African museums and local epigraphic research. Between 1906 and 1927, Cagnat contributed to the publication of Inscriptiones Graecae ad res Romanas pertinentes (collection of Greek inscriptions on topics related to the Roman Empire).

He married Geneviève Hauvette (1857–1935), the daughter of Eugène-Louis Hauvette-Besnault.

He was the stepfather of Alfred Merlin who succeeded him at the Academie des Inscriptions et Belles Lettres.

== Honours ==
In 1887, Cagnat was appointed a professor at the Collège de France, where he succeeded Desjardins at the chair of Roman epigraphy and antiquities. In 1895, he was elected a member of the Académie des Inscriptions et Belles-Lettres, of which he was permanent secretary from 1916 to his death. In 1904, on the recommendation of Otto Hirschfeld and Ulrich von Wilamowitz-Moellendorff, he was elected a corresponding member of the Prussian Academy of Sciences. Elected member of the Royal Academy of Science, Letters and Fine Arts of Belgium.

== Publications (selection) ==
- 1882: Etude historique sur les impots indirects chez les Romains jusqu'aux invasions des barberes, Paris, Imprimerie nationale
- 1885: Cours d'épigraphie latine, Paris, reprint 1890 (read the 1890 edition online)
- 1892: L'armée romaine d'Afrique et l'occupation militaire de l'Afrique sous les empereurs, Paris
- 1895–1905 Timgad, une cité africaine sous l'Empire romain with Émile Boeswillwald and Albert Ballu, éd. Ernest Leroux, Paris, (read online)
- 1909: Carthage, Timgad, Tébessa et les villes antiques de l'Afrique du Nord, Paris, reprint 1927
- 1916–1920: Manuel d'archéologie romaine with Victor Chapot, Paris
- 1923: Inscriptions latines d'Afrique, Paris

== Bibliography ==
- (in German) Christa Kirsten [sous la dir. de], Die Altertumswissenschaften an der Berliner Akademie. Wahlvorschläge zur Aufnahme von Mitgliedern von F.A. Wolf bis zu G. Rodenwaldt, éd. Akademie-Verlag, Berlin, 1985 (vol. 5 des études sur l'histoire de l'German Academy of Sciences at Berlin), pp. 128–129
