= SNCF Class Z 20500 =

Type of double-decker, dual-voltage electric multiple unit trainset

Z 20500
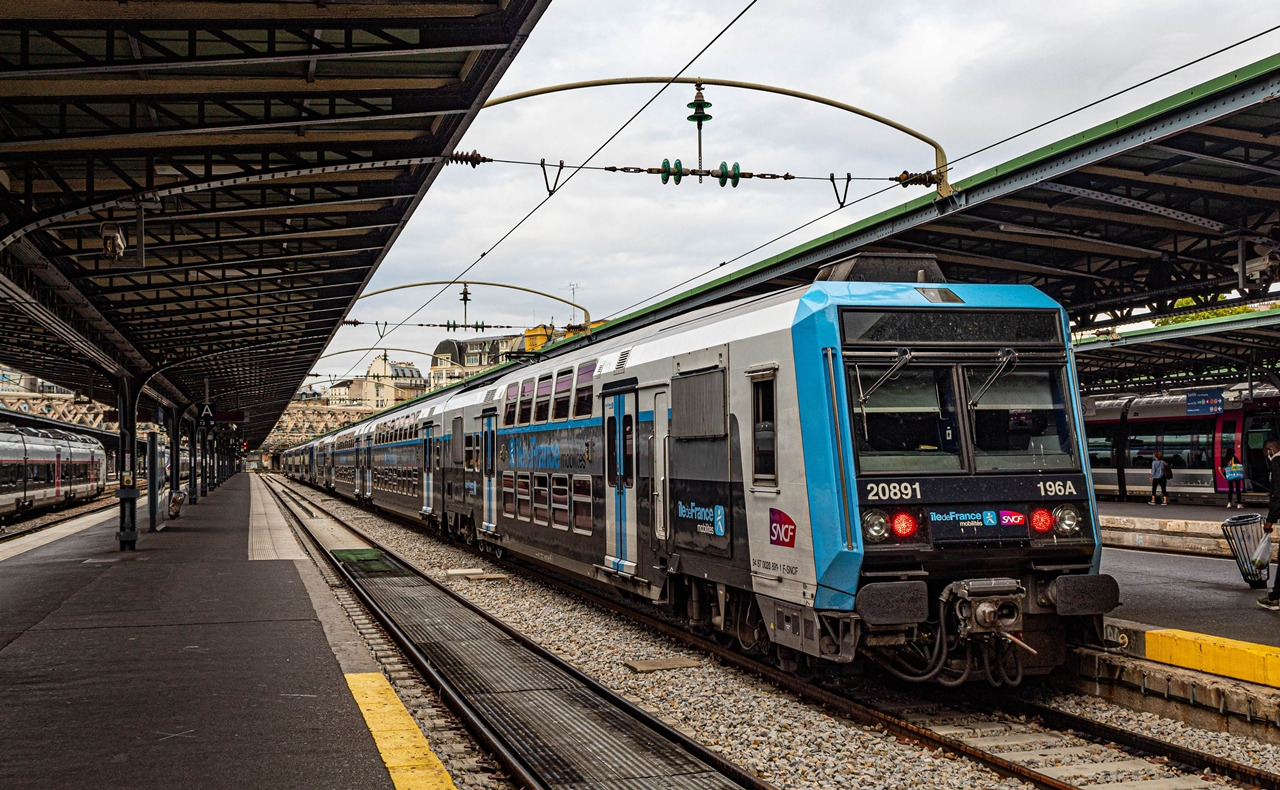
- Z 20500 trainset operating on the Transilien Line P line at Gare de l'Est
- In service: 1988–present
- Manufacturers: ANF, CIMT, and GEC Alsthom
- Family name: Z 2N series
- Constructed: 1988–1998
- Entered service: 20 September 1988
- Refurbished: 2007–2016, 2019–2023
- Number built: 200 trainsets (934 cars)
- Number in service: 200
- Successor: Z 58500; Z57000; Z 2N-NG
- Formation: 4 or 5 cars per trainset: 66 trainsets with 4 cars; 134 trainsets with 5 cars
- Fleet numbers: Z 20501/2 to 20899/900
- Operators: SNCF (RER and Transilien)
- Depots: Joncherolles; Les Ardoines; Noisy-le-Sec; Villeneuve-Saint-Georges
- Line served: RER RER C RER D Transilien Transilien Line P (Paris-Est) Transilien Line R (Paris-Gare-de-Lyon) Transilien Line V

Specifications
- Car body construction: Copper steel Stainless steel
- Width: 2.82 m (9 ft 3 in)
- Height: 4.32 m (14 ft 2 in)
- Doors: 2 pairs per side, per car
- Maximum speed: 140 km/h (87 mph)
- Weight: Motor cars: 69 t (152,000 lb); Trailer cars: 43 t (95,000 lb)
- Traction system: GEC Alsthom thyristor chopper and thyristor phase sequence inverter
- Traction motors: 8x asynchronous (4 FHA 2870)
- Power output: 2,800 kW (3,800 hp)
- Transmission: Gear wheel, hollow shaft and cardan shaft, 4.18 ratio
- Acceleration: 1 m/s^{2} (3.3 ft/s^{2}) 4 cars 0.77 m/s^{2} (2.5 ft/s^{2}) 5 cars
- Deceleration: 0.85 m/s^{2} (2.8 ft/s^{2}) (service); 0.95 m/s^{2} (3.1 ft/s^{2}) (emergency)
- Electric systems: Overhead line: 25 kV 50 Hz AC; 1,500 V DC
- Current collection: Pantograph (type AM 91BU)
- Bogies: type Y401(motor)/Y30PL(trailer), H shape
- Braking system: Electrodynamic
- Safety systems: Crocodile, KVB
- Coupling system: Scharfenberg type
- Multiple working: Other Z 2N series trains (Z 5600, Z 8800, Z 20500, Z 20900)
- Track gauge: 1,435 mm (4 ft 8 1/2 in) standard gauge

The SNCF Class Z 20500 is a double-deck, dual-voltage electric multiple unit trainset that are operated by SNCF on the Réseau Express Régional (RER), a hybrid suburban commuter and rapid transit system and the Transilien, a suburban commuter rail system, both serving Paris and its Île-de-France suburbs.

The 200 trains were built by a consortium of French manufacturer Alstom (then known as GEC Alsthom), ANF Industrie (which would be purchased by Bombardier in 1989 before the end of the deliveries), and Compagnie industrielle de matériel de transport (CIMT). The final assembly of the trains took place between 1988 and 1998.

They are part of the Z 2N series of trainsets, which were continuously improved over several generations.

== Specifications ==
=== Formations ===
The first Z 20500 trainsets delivered included "short" trailer cars that were 24.8 m (81 ft 4 in) in length and nearly identical to those used on the earlier Z 2N series trainsets (Z 5600/Z 8800) and the VB2N. After 1991, the consortium started delivering new "long" trailer cars that were 26.4 m (86 ft 7 in) in length. Over the years, the trailer cars have been shifted around to meet the needs of the different lines.

These are the current configurations of the Z 20500 trainsets:

- Four long cars: Two motor cars and two long trailer cars. Used on the RER C, Transilien P. Assigned to the Ardoines and Noisy depots.
- Five long cars: Two motor cars and three long trailer cars. Used on the RER D and Transilien R. Assigned to the Joncherolles and Villeneuve depots.
- Five short cars, including VB2N car: Two motor cars and two short trailer cars, extended by adding a VB2N car in 2003–2004 and in 2009–2012. Used on the RER D and Transilien R. Assigned to the Joncherolles depot.
- Five long cars, including VB2N car: Two motor cars and two long trailer cars, extended by adding a VB2N car in 2013. Used on the RER D and Transilien R. Assigned to the Joncherolles depot.

== Z 92050 ==
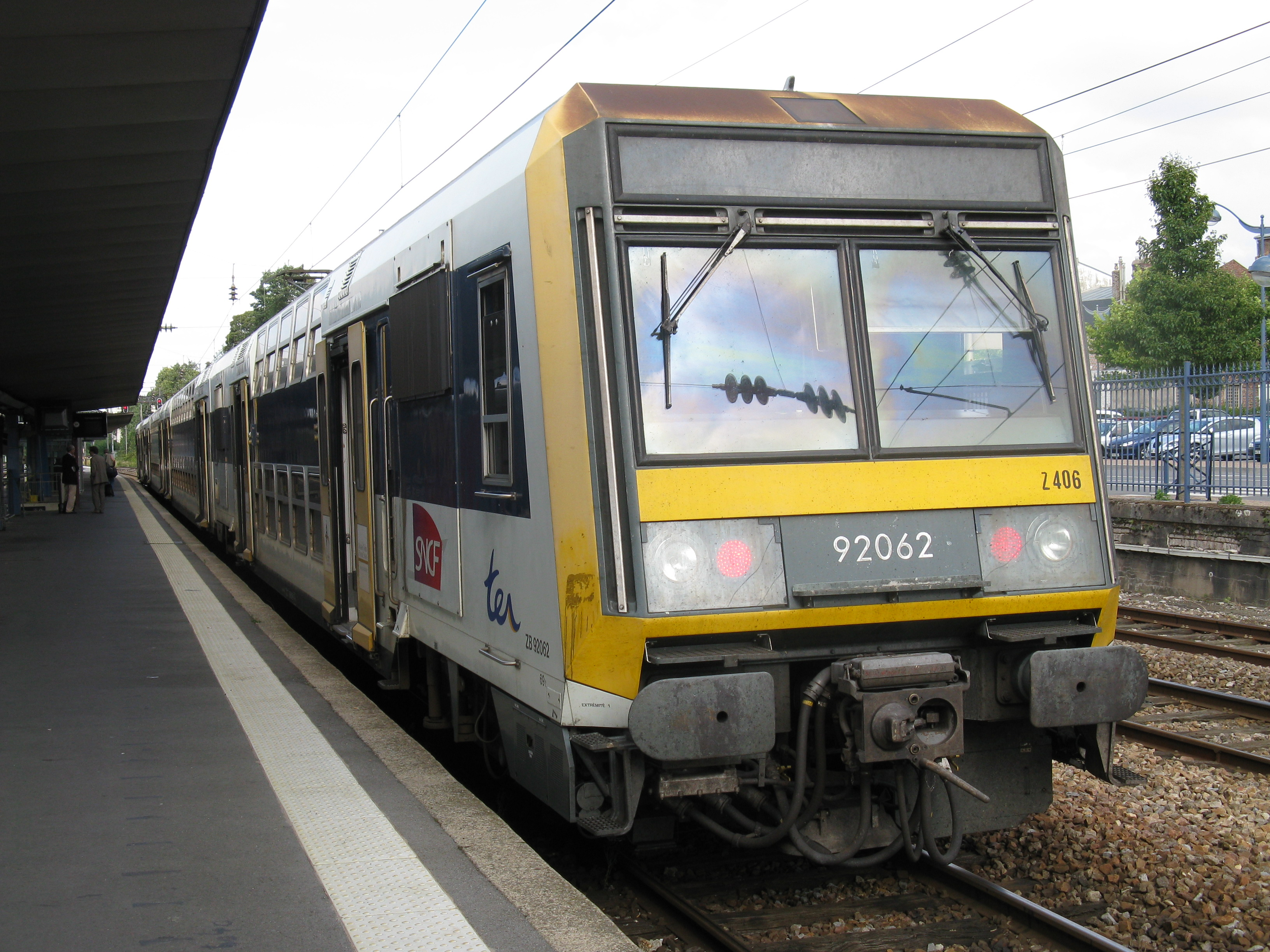
Class Z 92050 in original TER Nord-Pas-de-Calais livery at Arras station

Departure Z20500.

Ride in Z20500

At the start of the 1990s, the Nord-Pas-de-Calais region was looking to purchase double-deck electric multiple unit trainsets to add capacity on its busiest TER routes. In 1994, the region decided to join the Île-de-France's Z 20500 order, ordering six trainsets to be called the Class Z 92050. The fleet is delivered from the end of May to December 1996. The Z 92050 trains are technically identical to the Z 20500, but with a more comfortable 2+2 seating (instead of the 3+2 seating in Z 20500) and the addition of a bathroom in the motor car.

The equipment received heavy use for nearly two decades but as more modern double-deck equipment was delivered (Z 23500, TER 2N NG, and Regio 2N), it became more challenging to have a small and unique type of equipment. So, in December 2012, the Syndicat des transports d'Île-de-France (STIF) offered to purchase the Z 92050 fleet for €16.5 million to be split evenly by STIF and SNCF, operator of the Transilien network. The equipment received some modifications to make them suitable for one operator and then deployed on Transilien Line P.

== Fleet ==
this link leads to the Z20500 fleet page (in french) Z20500 fleet

== Description ==
=== Exterior ===
The Z20500 resumes the general architecture of Z5600 / Z8800, drawn by MBD design, having more angular shapes.

The windows have rounded corners, even that of the doors.

Many liveries have existed according to the renovations and wishes of the organizing authority :

- The "Ile de France" livery, blue white red
- the "transilien" livery, dark blue with berlingots
- the "Carmillon" livery (actual SNCF color) black Carmillon white
- and the "IDFM" livery (colors of the organizing authority) white, blue and black.

=== Interior ===
The interior is composed of two intermediate platforms at the ends and a two-level section in the center. The interior colors follow the renovations and the exterior livery in accordance with the exterior livery.

Despite 2 renovations, the Z20500 are not air conditioned, only the windows have a UV filter.

In 2007, the renovation 1 (2007-2016) consists in putting the Transilien livery (then Carmillon livery for the last ones) to remove the partitions of the old first missing classes, to change the organization of the seats from 2 + 2 to 3 + 2, allowing more passengers. The SIVE, "Système d'information voyageurs embarqué" (On-board passenger Information System) is also installed, made up at first of audio announcements (only for the trains running on the RER D), then since 2011, visual devices and Closed-circuit television.

In 2018 begins the renovation 2 (2018 -), The purpose of this work is to improve thermal comfort by affixing athermic films on the windows and by increasing the number of opening windows, to make improvements to the interior fittings (resumption of degraded upholstery, new lamination of the ceilings, replacement of all the seat fabrics, equipment of the platforms with USB sockets, etc.) and to improve passenger information with LED exterior front displays and by installing more loudspeakers . In addition, since 2020 LCD screens have been installed above the doors.

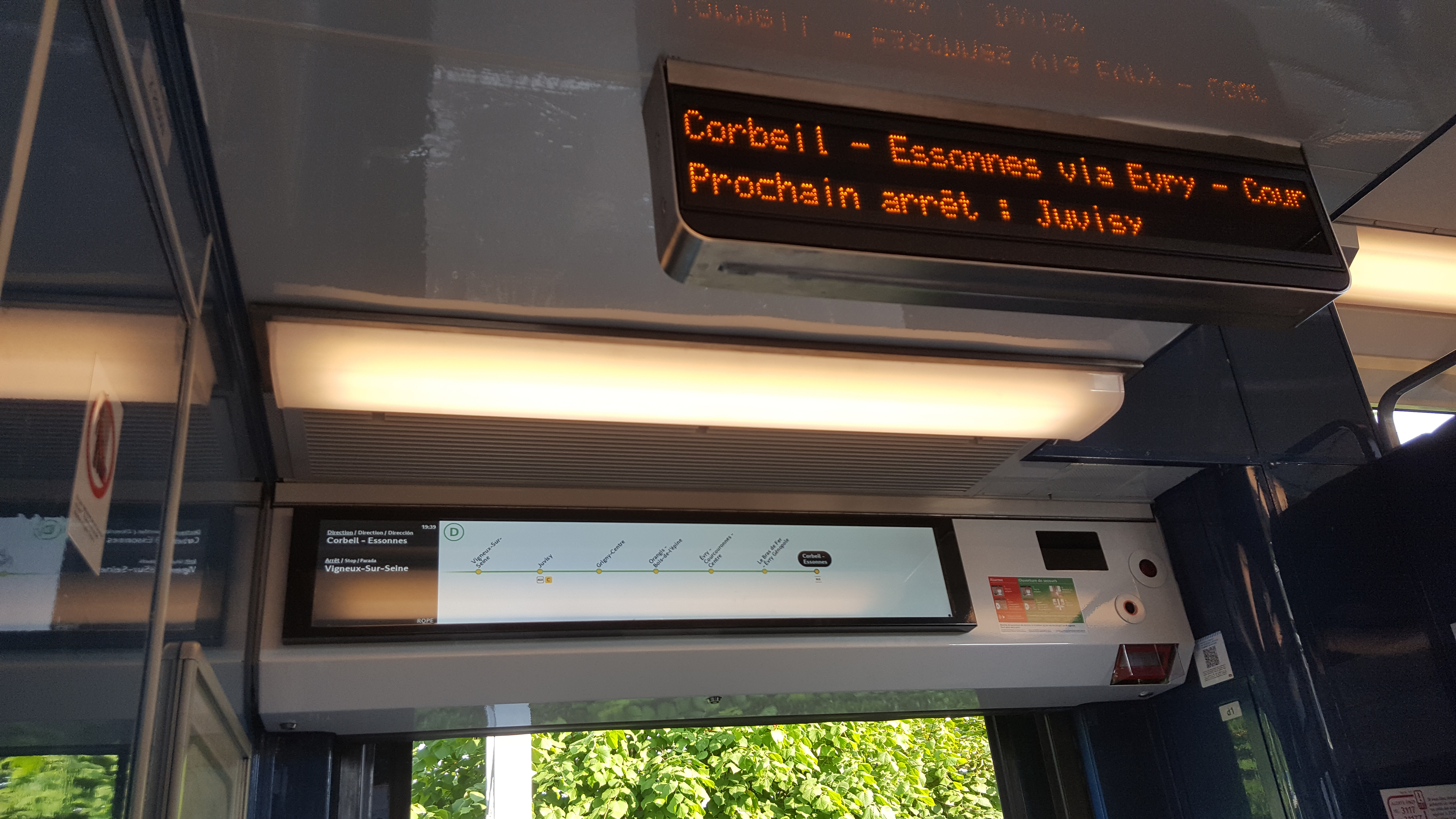
The old and the new SIVE for a complete information, in 2021

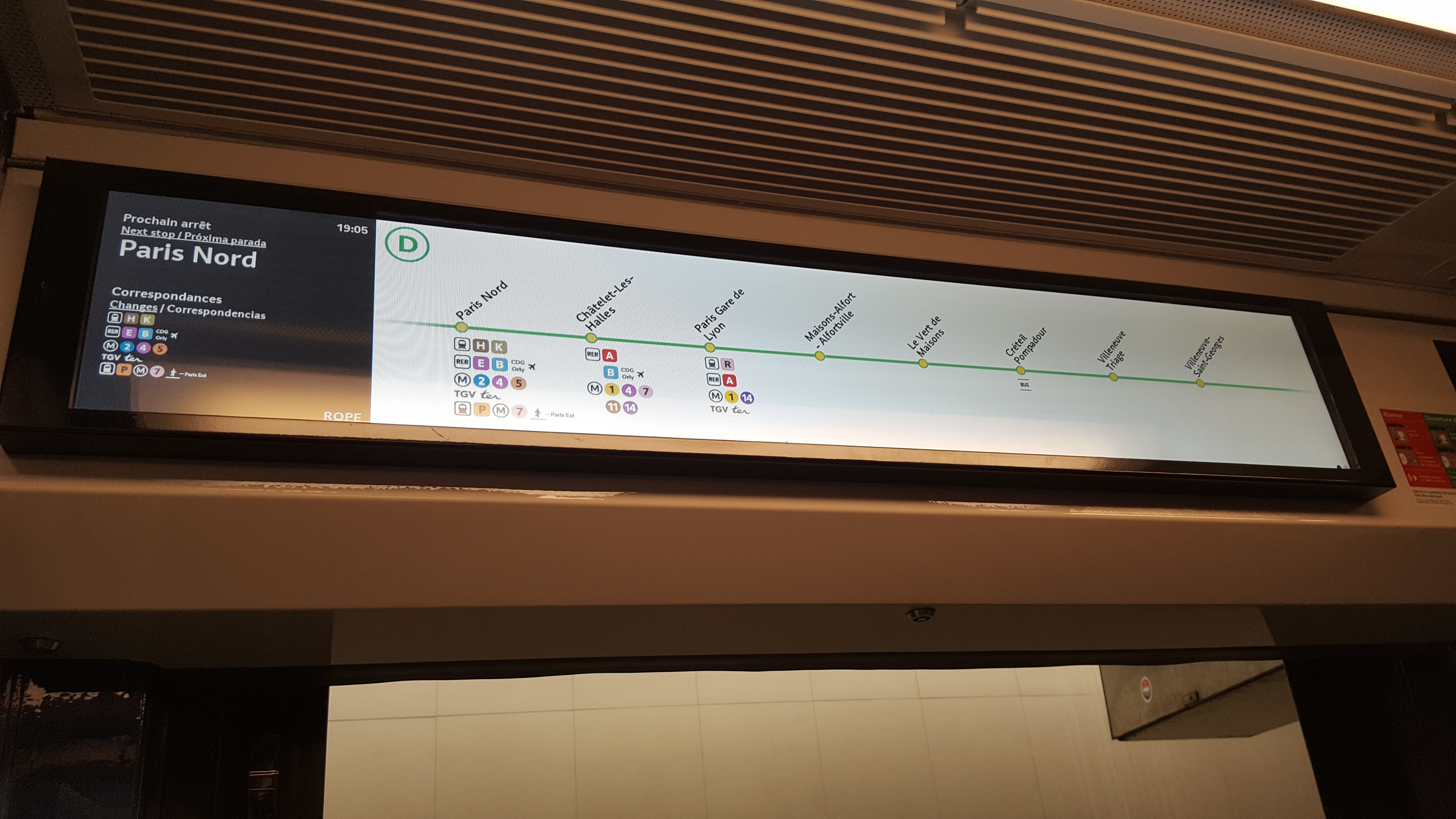
SIVE new generation LCD screens

== Formations ==
=== Line C ===
As of 25 December 2021, 45 Z20500 trainsets are based at the Les Ardoines SNCF depot.

As shown below, they are formed with two motored cars and two non-powered (trailer) cars (2M2T).

	← Versailles/Pontoise/St Quentin-en-Yvelines Juvisy/Massy-Palaiseau/Saint-Martin-d'Étampes →			
Car No.	1 >	2	3	< 4
Type	Motor	Trailer	Trailer	Motor
Numbering	Z 20xxx (odd number)	ZRB 201xxx (odd number)	ZRB 202xxx (odd number)	Z 20xxx (even number)

- < or > show a pantograph. Cars 1 and 4 are each equipped with one pantograph.
- Car 2 was formerly a mixed 1st class and 2nd class car.

=== Line P ===
As of 25 December 2021, 21 Z20500 trainsets were based at the Noisy le Sec SNCF depot.

As shown below, they are formed with two motored cars and two non-powered (trailer) cars (2M2T).

	← Gare de l'Est (Paris) Meaux/Château Thierry →			
Car No.	1 >	2	3	< 4
Type	Motor	Trailer	Trailer	Motor
Numbering	Z 20xxx (odd number)	ZRB 201xxx (odd number)	ZRB 202xxx (odd number)	Z 20xxx (even number)

- < or > show a pantograph. Cars 1 and 4 are each equipped with one pantograph.
- Car 2 was formerly a mixed 1st class and 2nd class car.

=== Line D ===
As of 25 December 2021, 134 Z20500 trainsets were based at the Villeneuve and Les Joncherolles SNCF depots.

As shown below, they are formed with two motored cars and three non-powered (trailer) cars (2M3T).

	← Creil Corbeil-Essonnes/Malesherbes/Melun →				
Car No.	1 >	2	3	4	< 5
Type	Motor	Trailer	Trailer	Trailer	Motor
Numbering	Z 20xxx (odd number)	ZRB 201xxx (odd number)	ZRB 202xxx (odd number)	ZRB 203xxx (odd number)	Z 20xxx (even number)

- < or > show a pantograph. Cars 1 and 5 were each equipped with one pantograph.
- Car 3 was formerly a mixed 1st class and 2nd class car

== Photo gallery ==
=== Exterior ===
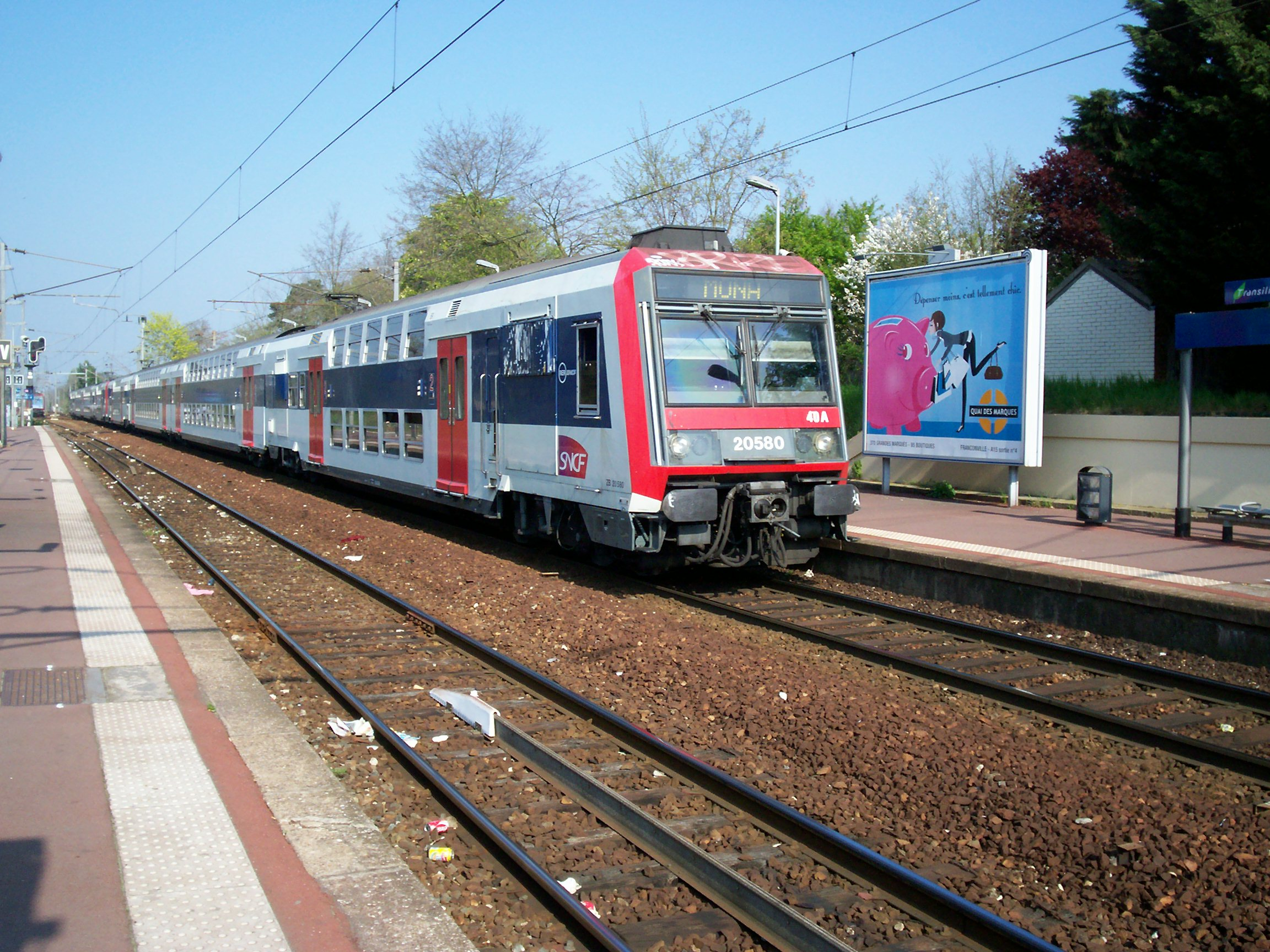
Z 20500 on RER C in original Île-de-France livery

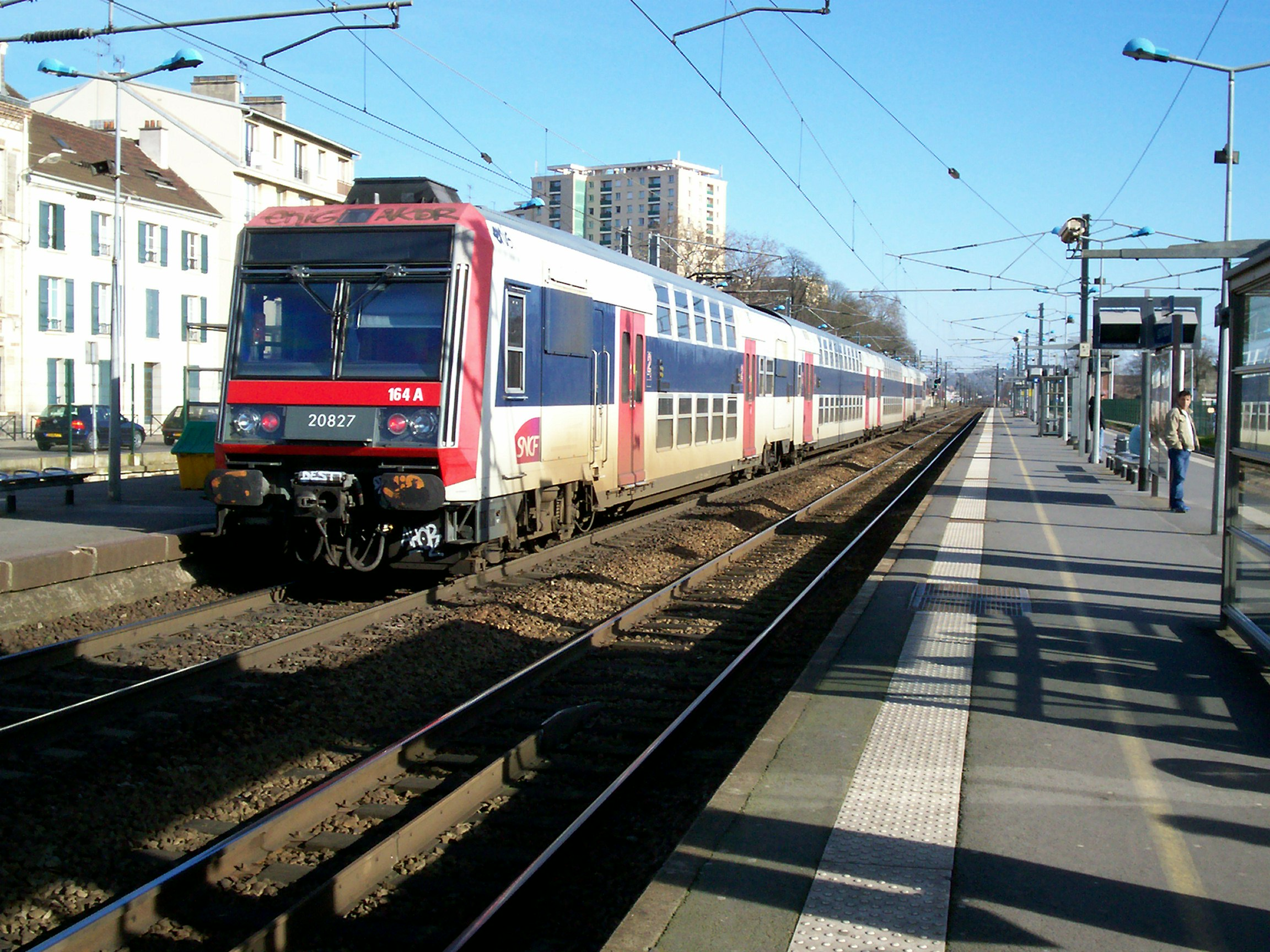
Transilien running MERI service

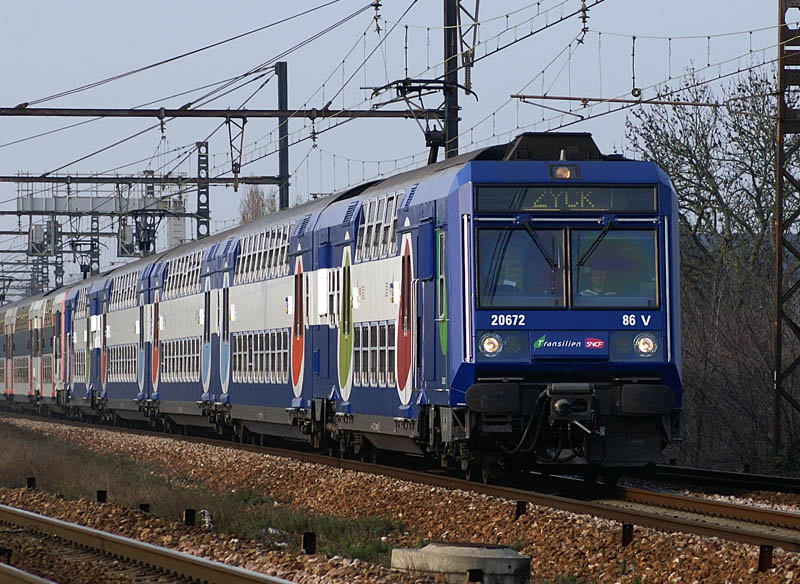
Z 20500 in Transilien livery in Cesson

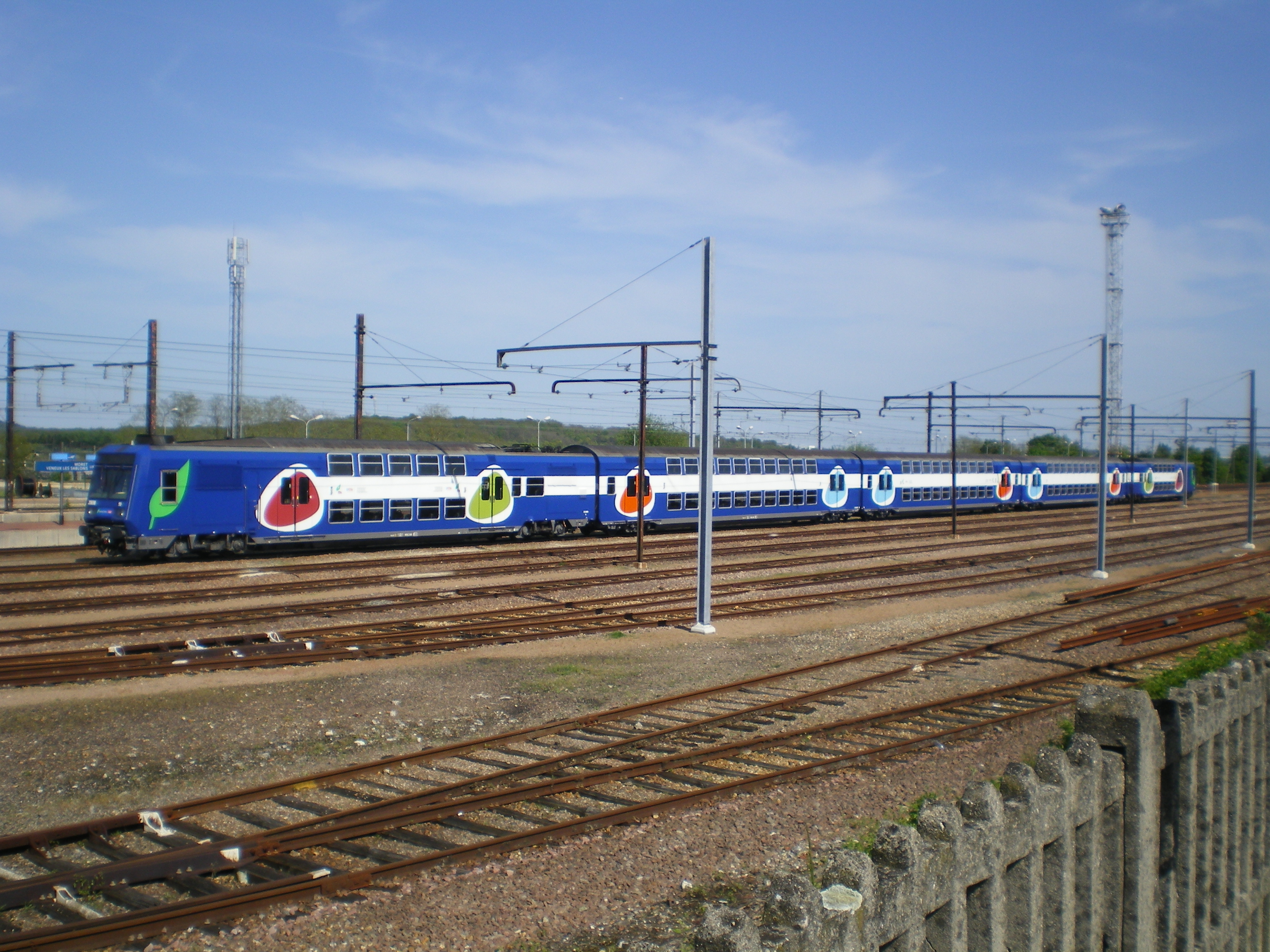
Full view of Z 20500 in Transilien livery near Moret-sur-Loing

Z 20500 in Transilien livery near Moret-sur-Loing

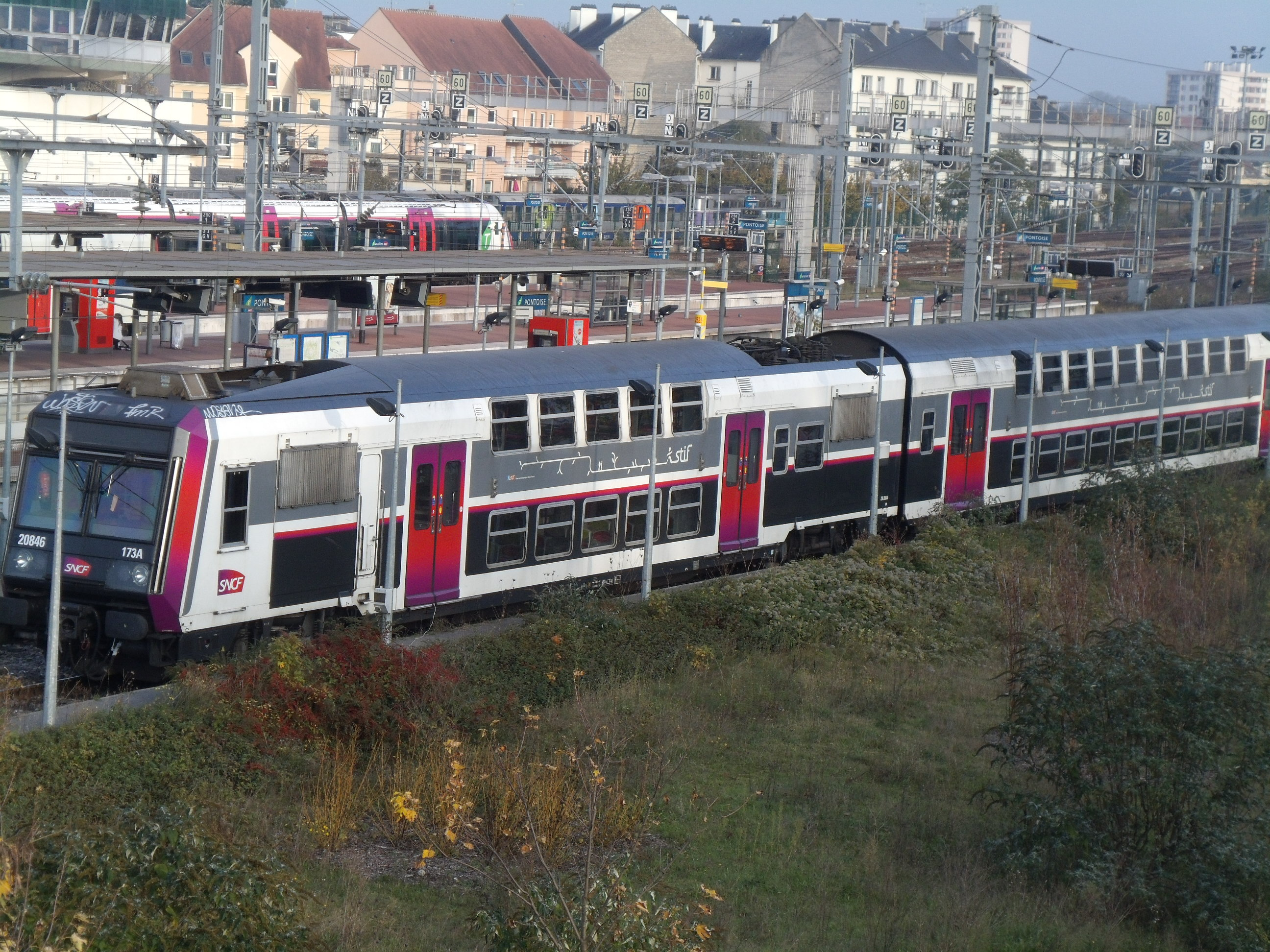
Z 20500 in Carmillon/STIF livery at Pontoise station

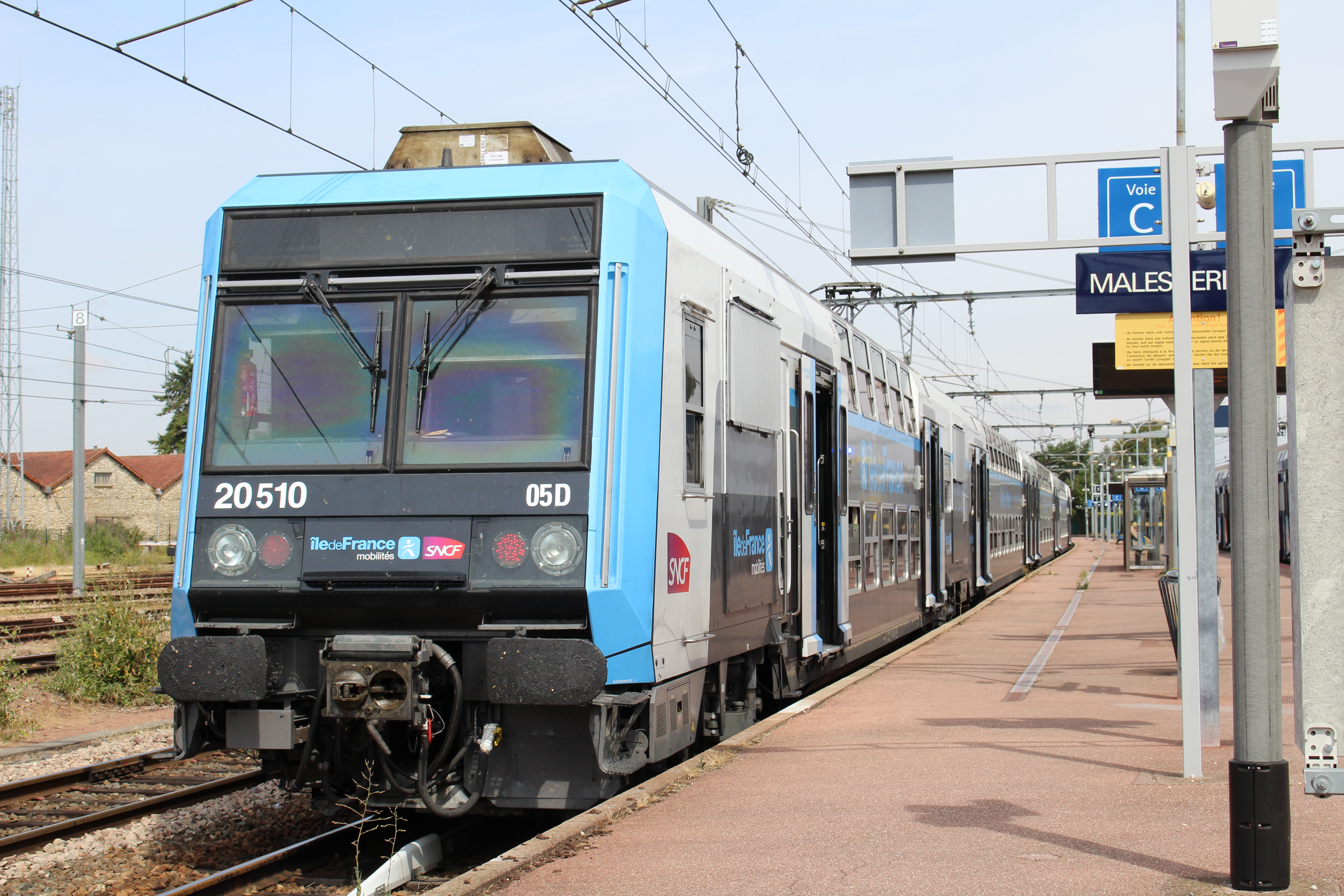
Z 20500 in newest Île-de-France Mobilités livery at Malesherbes station

=== Interior ===
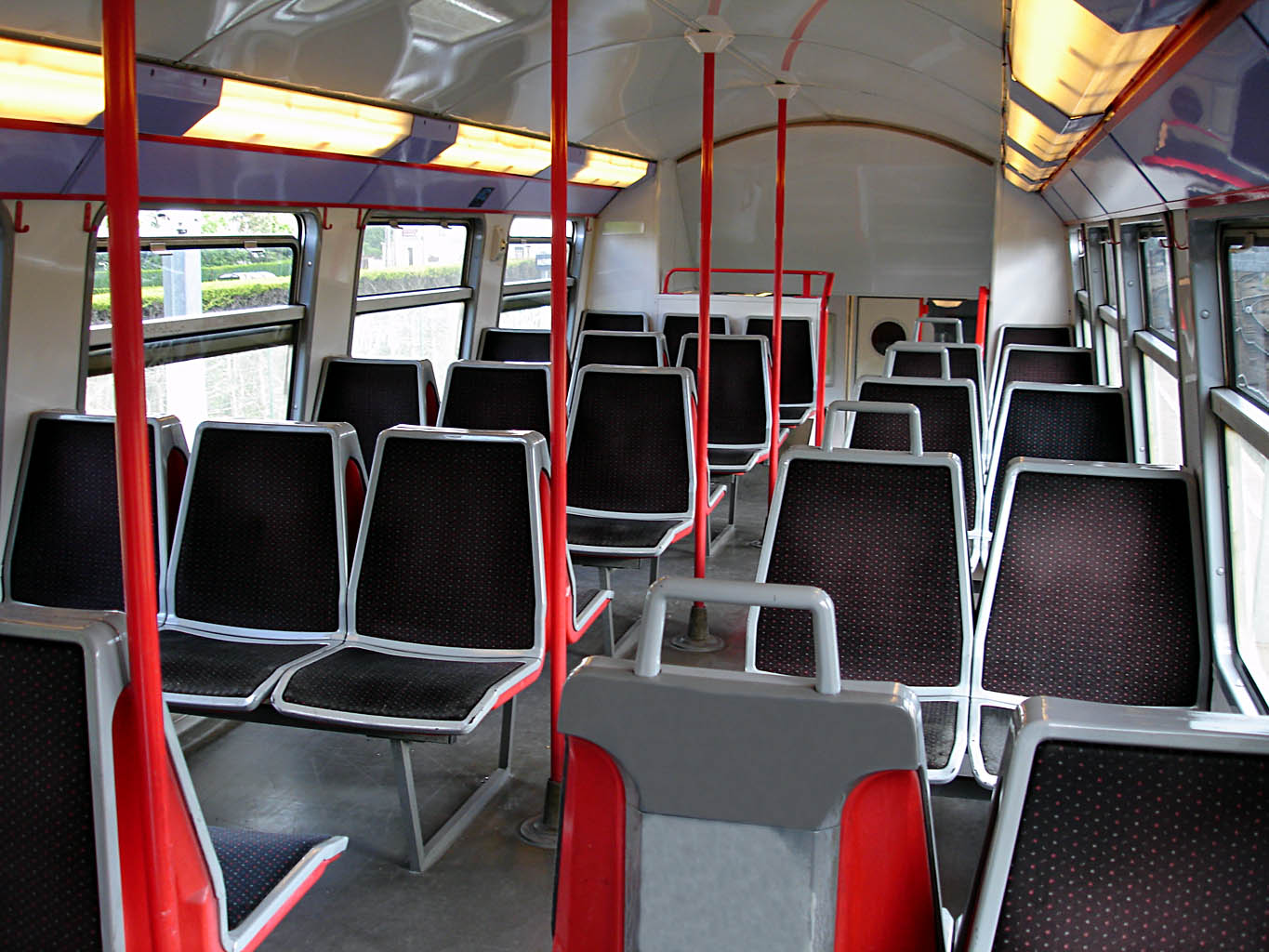
Original interior of Z 20500 train

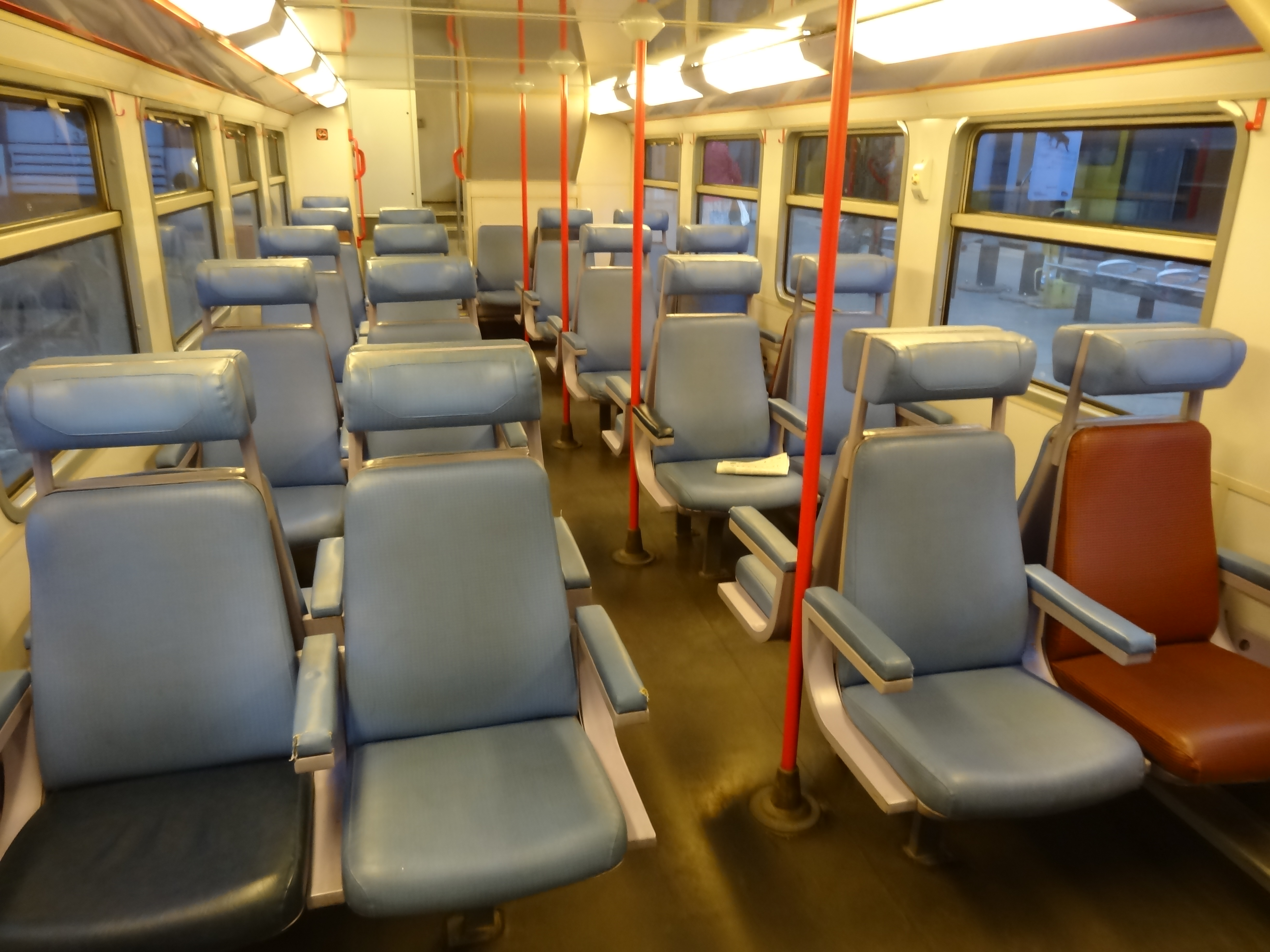
Original interior of Z 92050 train

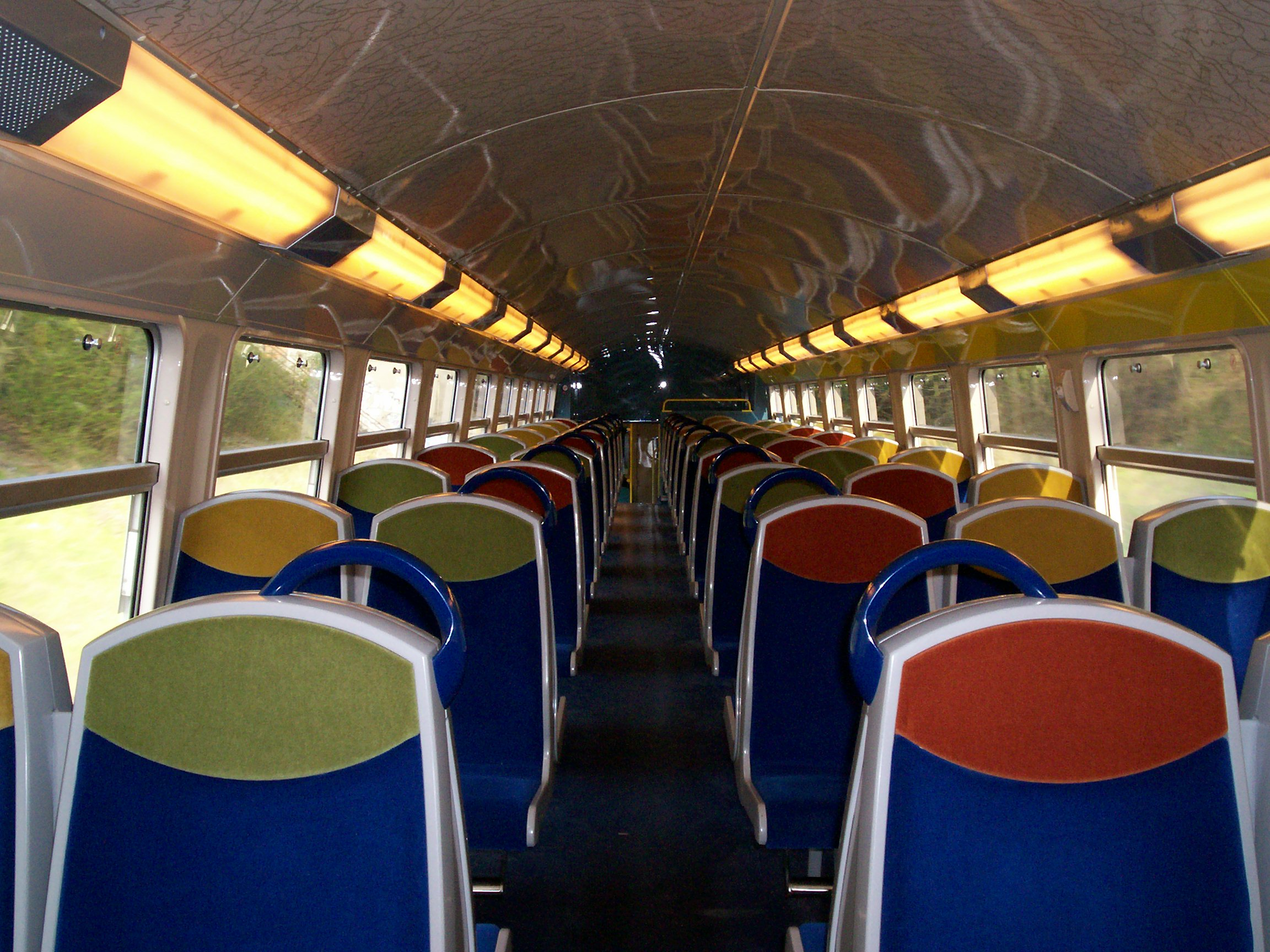
Z 20500 interior after first renovation

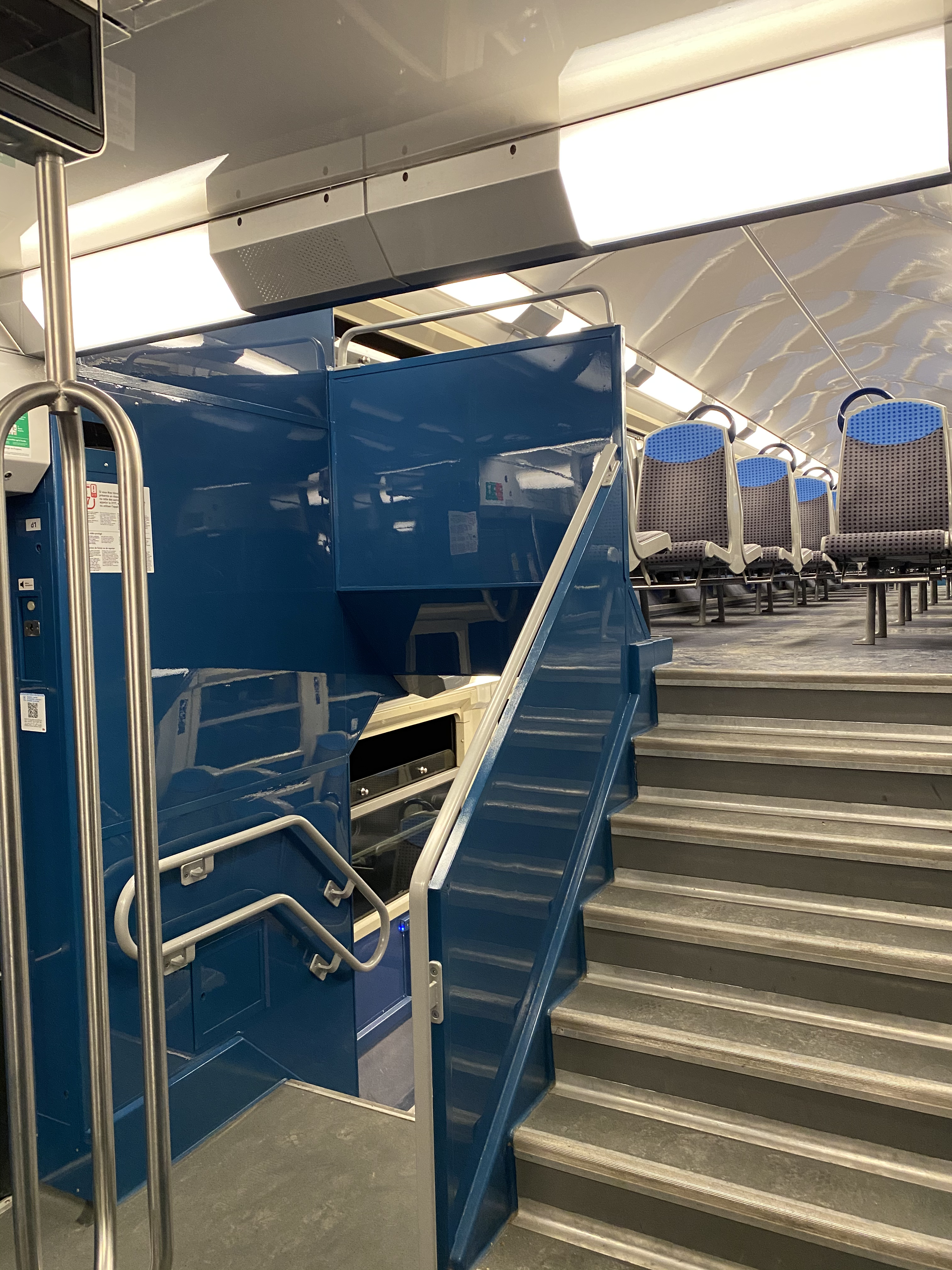
Z 20500 interior after second renovation

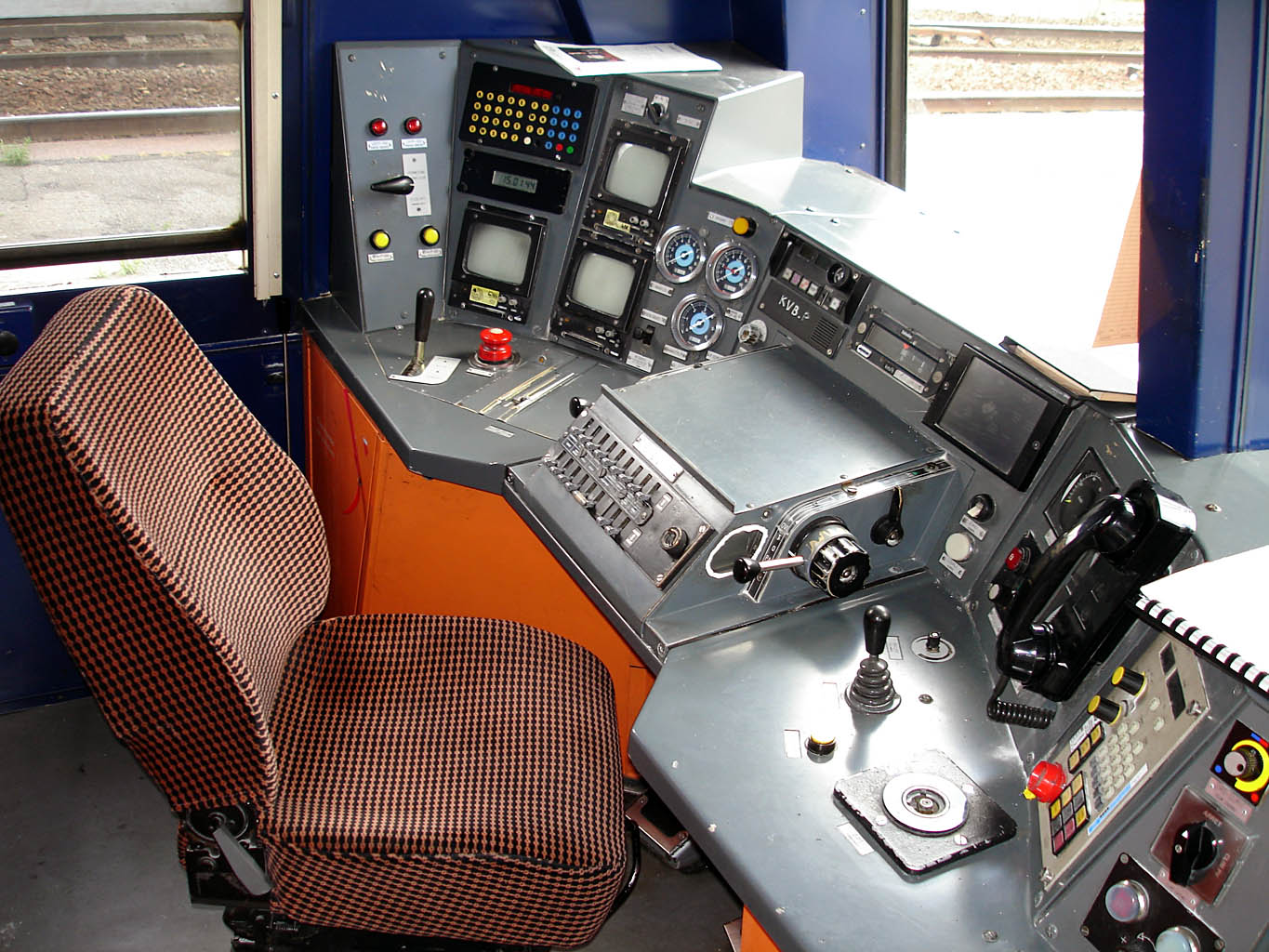
Operators compartment

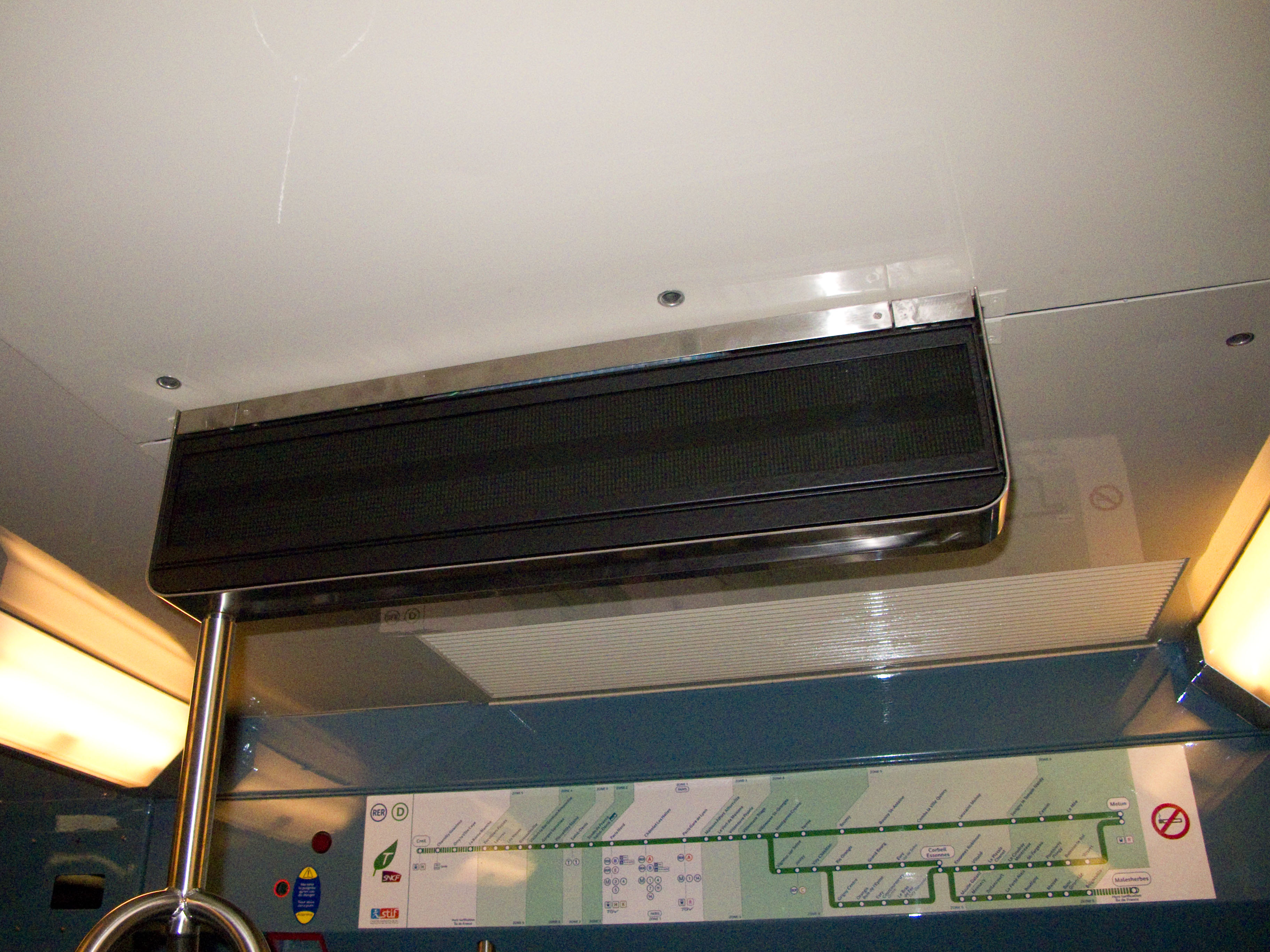
Customer information display

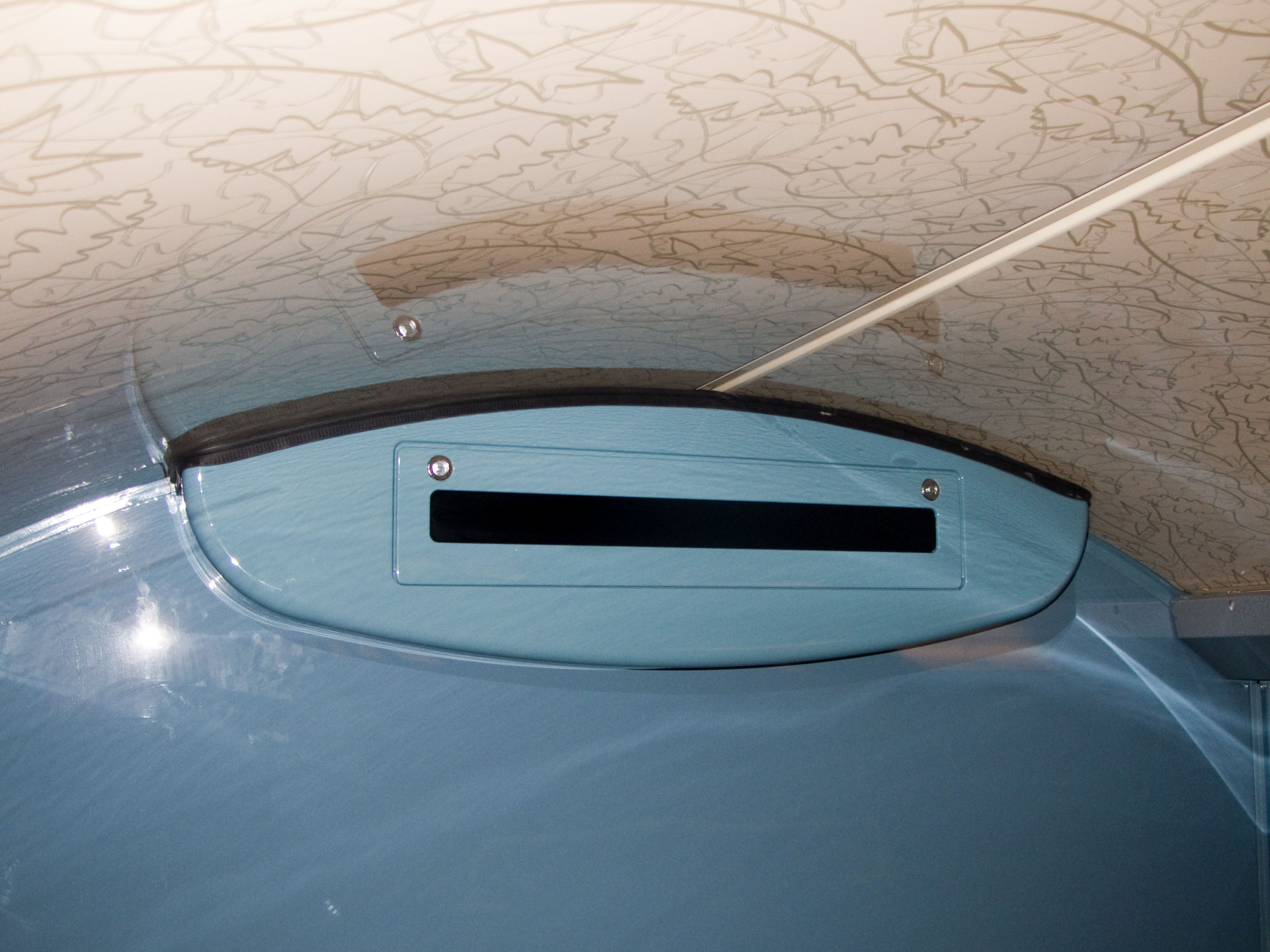
Customer information display

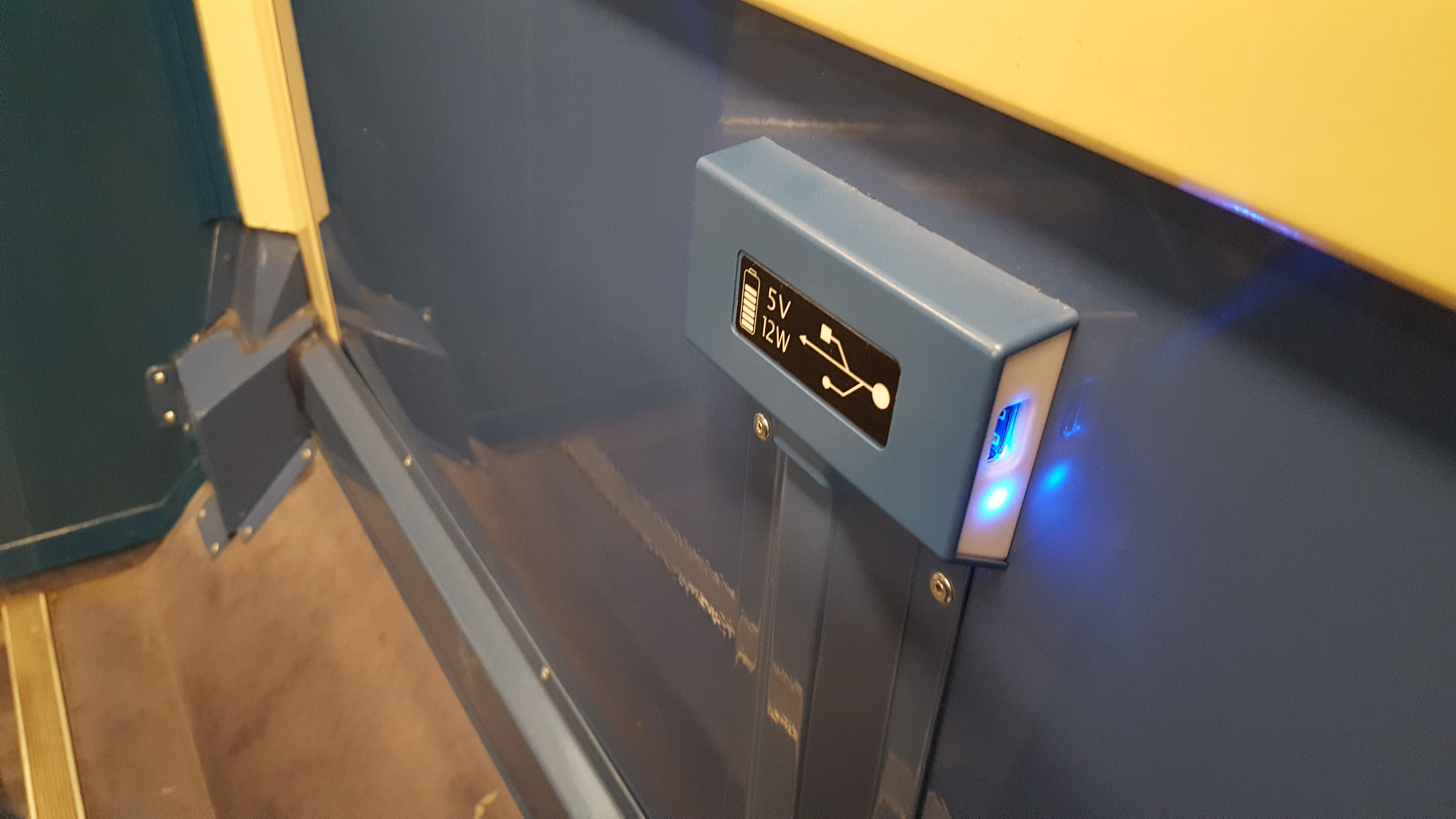
USB socket
