= Eugène-Louis Hauvette-Besnault =

French Indologist (1820–1888)

- Born: 5 February 1820; Malesherbes
- Died: 28 June 1888 (aged 68); Malesherbes
- Occupation: Indologist

Eugène-Louis Hauvette-Besnault (5 February 1820 – 28 June 1888) was a 19th-century French Indologist.

== Biography ==
Eugène-Louis Hauvette-Besnault was professor of sanskrit at the École pratique des hautes études (EPHE). Agrégé de lettres in 1853, he translated volumes IV and V of the Bhagavata Purana.

He was one of Eugène Burnouf's last students. Among his own students in Sanskrit were James Darmesteter and Abel Bergaigne.

The historian and epigrapher René Cagnat was his stepson.

== Publications ==
- 1859: Morceaux choisis en prose et en vers des classiques anglais, with Frédéric-Gustave Eichhoff.
- 1865: Pantchâdhyâyi, ou les Cinq chapitres sur les amours de Crichna avec les Gopîs, extrait du Bhâgavata Purâna, livre X, chapitres XXIX-XXXIII
- 1867: Le Mahâbhârata, poème épique de Krishna-Dwaipayana, traduit complètement pour la première fois du sanscrit en français, by M. Hippolyte Fauche. Compte rendu signé Hauvette-Besnault
- 1881: Le Bhâgavata purâna ou Histoire poétique de Kreichna, by Eugène Burnouf, Eugène Louis Hauvette-Besnault, Alfred Roussel and Jean Filliozat
- 1886: Épisode des grains de riz écrasés
- 1898: Le Bhâgavata Purâna ou Histoire poétique de Kreichna by Eugène Burnouf, Eugène-Louis Hauvette-Besnault and Alfred Roussel
