= Goussainville station =

Railway station in Goussainville, France

Goussainville
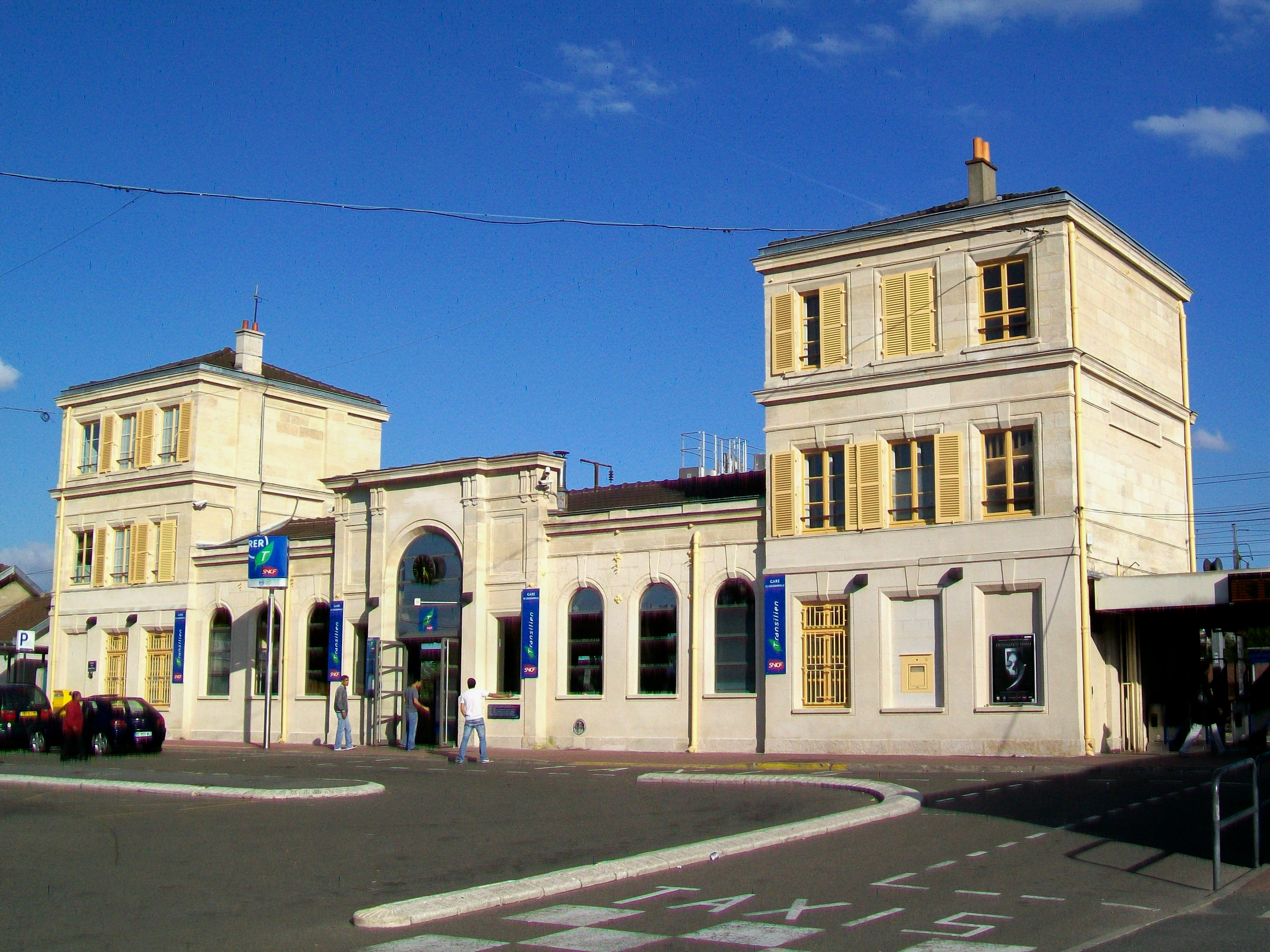
- Exterior of Gare de Goussainville

General information
- Location: Place de 8 mai 1945, 95280 Goussainville, Val d'Oise, Île-de-France, France
- Coordinates: 49°01′26″N 2°27′47″E
- Operator: SNCF
- Lines: Paris–Lille railway RER D
- Platforms: 2 (1 side and 1 central)
- Tracks: 5 (3 to garage, 2 rapid pass)
- Train operators: SNCF
- Connections: Noctilien Line N146

Other information
- Station code: 87276246
- Fare zone: 5

History
- Opened: 1859

Passengers
- 2024: 5,690,505

Services
Preceding station	RER	Following station
Les Noues towards Creil	RER D D1–D3	Villiers-le-Bel–Gonesse–Arnouville towards Melun or Malesherbes
Terminus	RER D D7	Villiers-le-Bel–Gonesse–Arnouville towards Melun or Malesherbes
Location

Goussainville is a railway station in Goussainville, Val d'Oise, Île-de-France, France. The station was opened on 1859, and it is on the Paris-Lille railway. This station, together with the station of Les Noues station, serves the commune of Goussainville.

== History ==
The line from Saint-Denis station to Creil via Survilliers - Fosses was opened in 1859 by the Chemins de fer du Nord after six years of studies, with two tracks built at the station. That number was then doubled in 1907.

== Station info ==
The station of Goussainville was opened on 1859. It is at the 19.5 kilometer point of the Paris–Lille railway. It served 3,391,200 passengers in 2014, and during a survey in 2019, 5,227,952 people used the station.

== Train services ==
- Local services (RER D) Creil–Orry-la-Ville–Coye–Goussainville–Saint-Denis–Gare de Lyon–Villeneuve-Saint-Georges–Juvisy–Corbeil–Essonnes
- Local services (RER D) Goussainville–Saint-Denis–Gare de Lyon–Villeneuve-Saint-Georges–Montgeron-Crosne–Combs-la-Ville–Quincy–Melun
