= Malesherbes, Loiret =

Malesherbes
- Part of Le Malesherbois
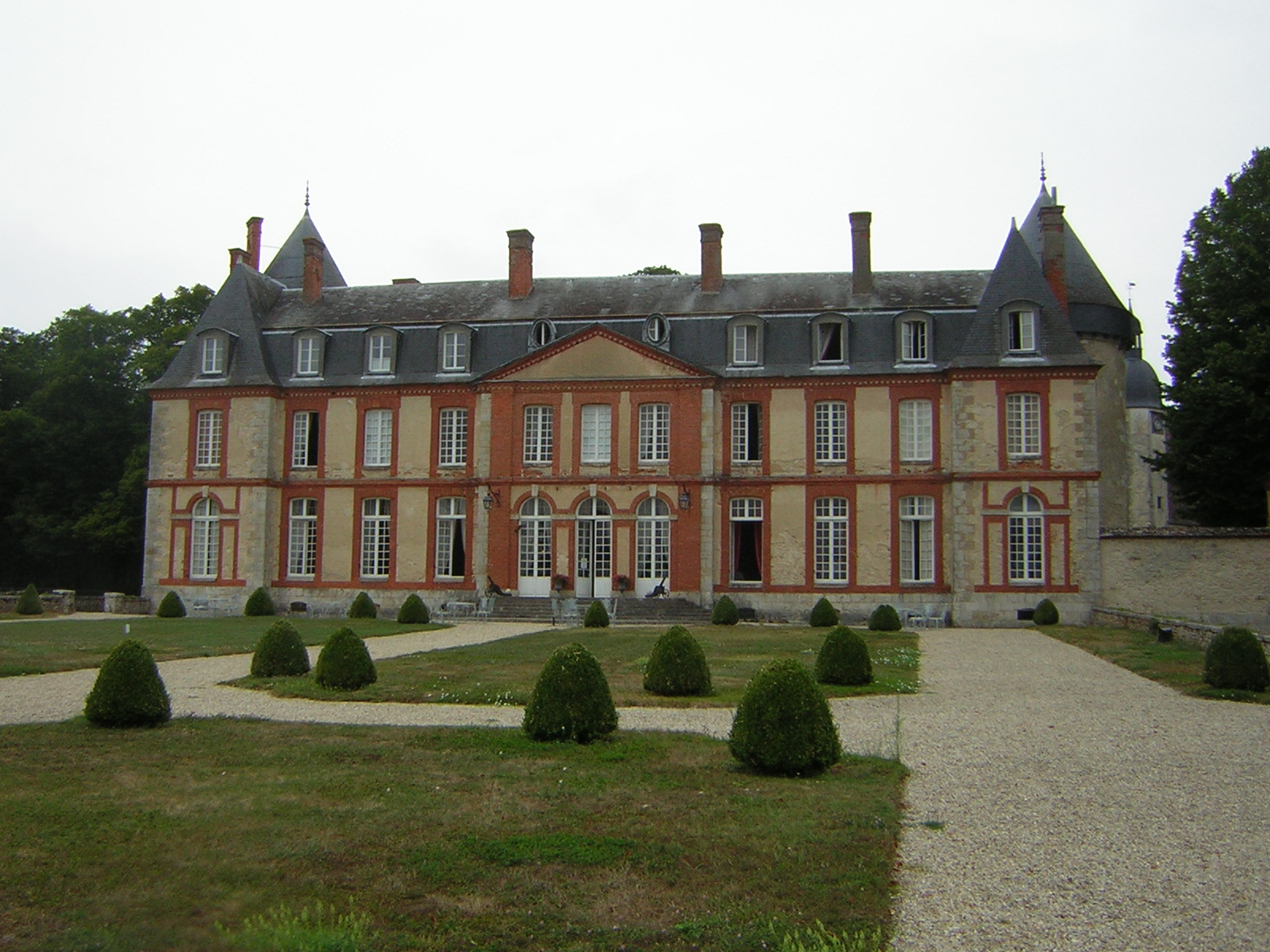
- Castle of Malesherbes

- Coat of arms
- Location of Malesherbes
- Location within France Location within Centre-Val de Loire
- Coordinates: 48°17′42″N 2°24′54″E
- Country: France
- Region: Centre-Val de Loire
- Department: Loiret
- Arrondissement: Pithiviers
- Canton: Le Malesherbois
- Commune: Le Malesherbois
- Area^{1}: 17.61 km^{2} (6.80 sq mi)
- Highest elevation: 140 m (460 ft)
- Lowest elevation: 67 m (220 ft)
- Population (2022): 6,004
  - Density: 340.9/km^{2} (883.0/sq mi)
- Time zone: UTC+01:00 (CET)
  - Summer (DST): UTC+02:00 (CEST)
- Postal code: 45330
- ^{1} French Land Register data, which excludes lakes, ponds, glaciers > 1 km^{2} (0.386 sq mi or 247 acres) and river estuaries.

Malesherbes (French pronunciation: [malzɛʁb]) is a former commune in the Loiret department in north-central France. On 1 January 2016, it was merged into the new commune of Le Malesherbois. It is 65 kilometers away from Orléans.

The terminus of the RER D is located in the commune.

== Notable people ==
- Chrétien Guillaume de Lamoignon de Malesherbes (1721-1794), magistrate, lawyer and French statesman. He lived in the Castle of Malesherbes.
- Eugène-Louis Hauvette-Besnault, Indologist, was born and died in Malesherbes.

== See also ==
- Communes of the Loiret department
