= Malesherbes station (Paris RER) =

Railway station in Malesherbes, France

Coordinates: 48°17′37″N 2°24′5″E

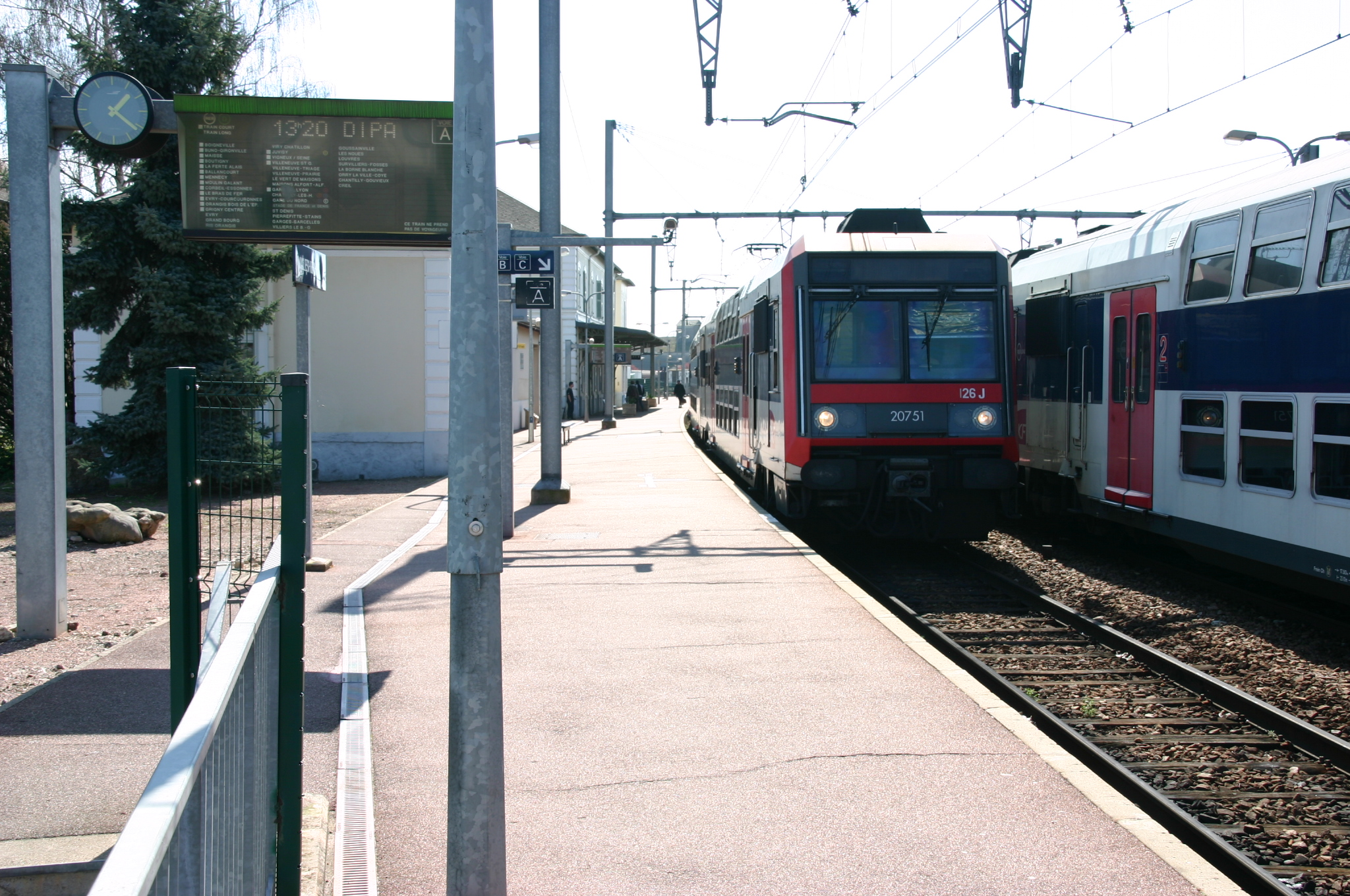
Gare de Malesherbes

Malesherbes is a railway station serving Malesherbes, Loiret, Centre-Val de Loire in central France. It is one of the termini for the RER D trains. It is the southern most RER station in the Île-de-France network.

Preceding station	RER	Following station
Boigneville towards Juvisy	RER D	Terminus
