= List of Transilien stations =

The following is a list of all stations of the Transilien network. For stations of the RER network, see the list of RER stations.

== Stations ==
Table outlining Transilien stations
Station	Transilien Line H (Paris-Nord)	Transilien Line J (Paris-Saint-Lazare)	Transilien Line K (Paris-Nord)	Transilien Line L (Paris-Saint-Lazare)	Transilien Line N (Paris-Montparnasse)	Transilien Line P (Paris-Est)	Transilien Line R (Paris-Gare-de-Lyon)	Transilien Line U	Transilien Line V	Zone	Commune	Dept.	Code
Achères-Ville				Transilien Line L (Paris-Saint-Lazare)						5	Achères	78	87381657
Andrésy		Transilien Line J (Paris-Saint-Lazare)								5	Andrésy	78	87381491
Argenteuil		Transilien Line J (Paris-Saint-Lazare)								4	Argenteuil	95	87381848
Asnières-sur-Seine		Transilien Line J (Paris-Saint-Lazare)		Transilien Line L (Paris-Saint-Lazare)						3	Asnières-sur-Seine	92	87381137
Aubergenville-Élisabethville		Transilien Line J (Paris-Saint-Lazare)								5	Aubergenville	78	87386730
Aulnay-sous-Bois			Transilien Line K (Paris-Nord)							4	Aulnay-sous-Bois	93	87271411
Auvers-sur-Oise	Transilien Line H (Paris-Nord)									5	Auvers-sur-Oise	95	87276543
Bagneaux-sur-Loing							Transilien Line R (Paris-Gare-de-Lyon)			5	Bagneaux-sur-Loing	77	87684191
Bécon-les-Bruyères				Transilien Line L (Paris-Saint-Lazare)						3	Courbevoie	92	87382002
Bellevue					Transilien Line N (Paris-Montparnasse)					3	Meudon	92	87393116
Belloy–Saint-Martin	Transilien Line H (Paris-Nord)									5	Belloy-en-France	95	87276550
Bessancourt	Transilien Line H (Paris-Nord)									5	Bessancourt	95	87276642
Beynes					Transilien Line N (Paris-Montparnasse)					5	Beynes	78	87393363
Bois-Colombes		Transilien Line J (Paris-Saint-Lazare)								3	Bois-Colombes	92	87381079
Bois-le-Roi							Transilien Line R (Paris-Gare-de-Lyon)			5	Bois-le-Roi	77	87682203
Boissy-l'Aillerie		Transilien Line J (Paris-Saint-Lazare)								5	Boissy-l'Aillerie	95	87381152
Bonnières		Transilien Line J (Paris-Saint-Lazare)								5	Bonnières-sur-Seine	78	87415893
Boran-sur-Oise	Transilien Line H (Paris-Nord)									100	Boran-sur-Oise	60	87276444
Bouffémont - Moisselles	Transilien Line H (Paris-Nord)									5	Bouffémont	95	87276485
Bougival				Transilien Line L (Paris-Saint-Lazare)						4	La Celle-Saint-Cloud	78	87382440
Bourron-Marlotte – Grez							Transilien Line R (Paris-Gare-de-Lyon)			5	Bourron-Marlotte	77	87684118
Bruyères-sur-Oise	Transilien Line H (Paris-Nord)									5	Bruyères-sur-Oise	95	87276451
Cergy-le-Haut				Transilien Line L (Paris-Saint-Lazare)						5	Cergy	95	87382655
Cergy-Préfecture				Transilien Line L (Paris-Saint-Lazare)						5	Cergy	95	87381905
Cergy-Saint-Christophe				Transilien Line L (Paris-Saint-Lazare)						5	Cergy	95	87382499
Cernay	Transilien Line H (Paris-Nord)									4	Ermont	95	87276063
Chailly – Boissy-le-Châtel						Transilien Line P (Paris-Est)				5	Chailly-en-Brie	77	87116343
Champ de courses d'Enghien	Transilien Line H (Paris-Nord)									4	Soisy-sous-Montmorency	95	87276030
Champagne-sur-Oise	Transilien Line H (Paris-Nord)									5	Champagne-sur-Oise	95	87276519
Champagne-sur-Seine							Transilien Line R (Paris-Gare-de-Lyon)			5	Champagne-sur-Seine	77	87682450
Champbenoist–Poigny						Transilien Line P (Paris-Est)				5	Poigny	77	87115873
Changis – Saint-Jean						Transilien Line P (Paris-Est)				5	Changis-sur-Marne	77	87116509
Chanteloup-les-Vignes		Transilien Line J (Paris-Saint-Lazare)								5	Chanteloup-les-Vignes	78	87381475
Chaponval	Transilien Line H (Paris-Nord)									5	Auvers-sur-Oise	95	87276162
Chars		Transilien Line J (Paris-Saint-Lazare)								5	Chars	95	87381194
Chartrettes							Transilien Line R (Paris-Gare-de-Lyon)			5	Chartrettes	77	87682419
Château-Thierry						Transilien Line P (Paris-Est)				100	Château-Thierry	02	87116582
Chauffry						Transilien Line P (Paris-Est)				5	Saint-Siméon	77	87116350
Chaumont-en-Vexin		Transilien Line J (Paris-Saint-Lazare)								100	Chaumont-en-Vexin	60	87381228
Chaville-Rive-Droite				Transilien Line L (Paris-Saint-Lazare)				Transilien Line U		3	Chaville	92	87382333
Chaville-Rive-Gauche					Transilien Line N (Paris-Montparnasse)					3	Chaville	92	87393207
Chelles–Gournay						Transilien Line P (Paris-Est)				4	Chelles	77	87116111
Chézy-sur-Marne						Transilien Line P (Paris-Est)				100	Chézy-sur-Marne	02	87116574
Clamart					Transilien Line N (Paris-Montparnasse)					2	Clamart	92	87391565
Clichy–Levallois				Transilien Line L (Paris-Saint-Lazare)						2	Clichy	92	87381129
Coignières					Transilien Line N (Paris-Montparnasse)					5	Coignières	78	87393272
Colombes		Transilien Line J (Paris-Saint-Lazare)								3	Colombes	92	87381087
Compans			Transilien Line K (Paris-Nord)							5	Compans	77	87272047
Conflans-Fin-d'Oise		Transilien Line J (Paris-Saint-Lazare)		Transilien Line L (Paris-Saint-Lazare)						5	Conflans-Sainte-Honorine	78	87381459
Conflans-Sainte-Honorine		Transilien Line J (Paris-Saint-Lazare)								5	Conflans-Sainte-Honorine	78	87381897
Cormeilles-en-Parisis		Transilien Line J (Paris-Saint-Lazare)								4	Cormeilles-en-Parisis	95	87381863
Coulommiers +						Transilien Line P (Paris-Est)				5	Coulommiers	77	87116301
Courbevoie				Transilien Line L (Paris-Saint-Lazare)						2	Courbevoie	92	87382200
Creil	Transilien Line H (Paris-Nord)									100	Creil	60	87276006
Crépy-en-Valois			Transilien Line K (Paris-Nord)							100	Crépy-en-Valois	60	87271593
Crouy-sur-Ourcq						Transilien Line P (Paris-Est)				5	Crouy-sur-Ourcq	77	87116640
Dammartin – Juilly – Saint-Mard			Transilien Line K (Paris-Nord)							5	Saint-Mard	77	87271536
Deuil–Montmagny	Transilien Line H (Paris-Nord)									4	Deuil-la-Barre	95	87276345
Domont	Transilien Line H (Paris-Nord)									4	Domont	95	87276436
Dordives							Transilien Line R (Paris-Gare-de-Lyon)			100	Dordives	45	87684233
Dreux					Transilien Line N (Paris-Montparnasse)					100	Dreux	28	87393488
Écouen - Ézanville	Transilien Line H (Paris-Nord)									4	Ézanville	95	87276394
Enghien-les-Bains	Transilien Line H (Paris-Nord)									4	Enghien-les-Bains	95	87276022
Épinay–Villetaneuse	Transilien Line H (Paris-Nord)									3	Épinay-sur-Seine	95	87271122
Épluches	Transilien Line H (Paris-Nord)									5	Saint-Ouen-l'Aumône	95	87276147
Épône – Mézières		Transilien Line J (Paris-Saint-Lazare)			Transilien Line N (Paris-Montparnasse)					5	Épône	78	87386763
Éragny – Neuville		Transilien Line J (Paris-Saint-Lazare)								5	Éragny	95	87381418
Ermont–Eaubonne	Transilien Line H (Paris-Nord)	Transilien Line J (Paris-Saint-Lazare)								4	Ermont	95	87276055
Ermont-Halte	Transilien Line H (Paris-Nord)									4	Ermont	95	87276584
Esbly						Transilien Line P (Paris-Est)				5	Esbly	77	87116327
Faremoutiers–Pommeuse						Transilien Line P (Paris-Est)				5	Pommeuse	77	87116277
Ferrières–Fontenay							Transilien Line R (Paris-Gare-de-Lyon)			100	Fontenay-sur-Loing	45	87684241
Fontaine-le-Port							Transilien Line R (Paris-Gare-de-Lyon)			5	Fontaine-le-Port	77	87682427
Fontainebleau–Avon							Transilien Line R (Paris-Gare-de-Lyon)			5	Avon	77	87682211
Fontainebleau-Forêt							Transilien Line R (Paris-Gare-de-Lyon)			5	Fontainebleau	77	
Fontenay-le-Fleury					Transilien Line N (Paris-Montparnasse)					5	Fontenay-le-Fleury	78	87393405
Franconville – Le Plessis-Bouchard	Transilien Line H (Paris-Nord)									4	Franconville	95	87276071
Frépillon	Transilien Line H (Paris-Nord)									5	Frépillon	95	87276659
Garancières – La Queue					Transilien Line N (Paris-Montparnasse)					5	Garancières	78	87393439
Garches – Marnes-la-Coquette				Transilien Line L (Paris-Saint-Lazare)						3	Garches	92	87382259
Gare de l'Est						Transilien Line P (Paris-Est)				1	Paris	75	87113001
Gare de Lyon							Transilien Line R (Paris-Gare-de-Lyon)			1	Paris	75	87686030
Gare du Nord	Transilien Line H (Paris-Nord)		Transilien Line K (Paris-Nord)							1	Paris	75	87271031
Gare Montparnasse					Transilien Line N (Paris-Montparnasse)					1	Paris	75	87391003
Gare Saint-Lazare		Transilien Line J (Paris-Saint-Lazare)		Transilien Line L (Paris-Saint-Lazare)						1	Paris	75	87384008
Gargenville		Transilien Line J (Paris-Saint-Lazare)								5	Gargenville	78	87381566
Gisors		Transilien Line J (Paris-Saint-Lazare)								100	Gisors	27	87381244
Gros Noyer–Saint-Prix	Transilien Line H (Paris-Nord)									4	Ermont	95	87276592
Groslay	Transilien Line H (Paris-Nord)									4	Groslay	95	87276360
Guérard – La Celle-sur-Morin						Transilien Line P (Paris-Est)				5	Guérard	77	87116269
Herblay		Transilien Line J (Paris-Saint-Lazare)								4	Herblay	95	87381889
Héricy							Transilien Line R (Paris-Gare-de-Lyon)			5	Héricy	77	87682435
Houdan					Transilien Line N (Paris-Montparnasse)					5	Houdan	78	87393462
Houilles–Carrières-sur-Seine		Transilien Line J (Paris-Saint-Lazare)		Transilien Line L (Paris-Saint-Lazare)						4	Houilles	78	87386409
Isles – Armentières – Congis						Transilien Line P (Paris-Est)				5	Isles-les-Meldeuses	77	87116616
Issou – Porcheville		Transilien Line J (Paris-Saint-Lazare)								5	Issou	78	87381574
Jouy-sur-Morin – Champgoulin						Transilien Line P (Paris-Est)				5	Jouy-sur-Morin	77	87430918
Jouy-sur-Morin – Eustache Lenoir						Transilien Line P (Paris-Est)				5	Jouy-sur-Morin	77	87430900
~~Jouy-sur-Morin – Le Marais~~						Transilien Line P (Paris-Est)				5	Jouy-sur-Morin	77	87116384
Jouy-sur-Morin – Monument aux Morts						Transilien Line P (Paris-Est)				5	Jouy-sur-Morin	77	87430884
Juziers		Transilien Line J (Paris-Saint-Lazare)								5	Juziers	78	87381558
L'Étang-la-Ville				Transilien Line L (Paris-Saint-Lazare)						5	L'Étang-la-Ville	78	87382473
L'Isle-Adam – Parmain	Transilien Line H (Paris-Nord)									5	Parmain	95	87276527
La Barre Ormesson	Transilien Line H (Paris-Nord)									4	Deuil-la-Barre	95	87271171
La Celle-Saint-Cloud				Transilien Line L (Paris-Saint-Lazare)						4	La Celle-Saint-Cloud	78	87382432
La Défense				Transilien Line L (Paris-Saint-Lazare)				Transilien Line U		3	Puteaux	92	87382218
La Ferté-Gaucher						Transilien Line P (Paris-Est)				5	La Ferté-Gaucher	77	87116392
La Ferté-Gaucher – Centre						Transilien Line P (Paris-Est)				5	La Ferté-Gaucher	77	87430819
La Ferté-Milon						Transilien Line P (Paris-Est)				100	La Ferté-Milon	02	87116673
La Ferté-sous-Jouarre						Transilien Line P (Paris-Est)				5	La Ferté-sous-Jouarre	77	87116517
La Frette – Montigny		Transilien Line J (Paris-Saint-Lazare)								4	La Frette-sur-Seine	95	87381871
La Garenne-Colombes				Transilien Line L (Paris-Saint-Lazare)						3	La Garenne-Colombes	92	87386003
La Grande-Paroisse							Transilien Line R (Paris-Gare-de-Lyon)			5	La Grande-Paroisse	77	87682476
La Verrière					Transilien Line N (Paris-Montparnasse)			Transilien Line U		5	La Verrière	78	87393256
Lagny – Thorigny						Transilien Line P (Paris-Est)				5	Thorigny-sur-Marne	77	87116319
Lavilletertre		Transilien Line J (Paris-Saint-Lazare)								100	Lavilletertre	60	87381202
Le Perray					Transilien Line N (Paris-Montparnasse)					5	Le Perray-en-Yvelines	78	87393298
Le Plessis-Belleville			Transilien Line K (Paris-Nord)							100	Le Plessis-Belleville	60	87271551
Le Stade		Transilien Line J (Paris-Saint-Lazare)								3	Colombes	92	87381095
Val d'Or				Transilien Line L (Paris-Saint-Lazare)						3	Saint-Cloud	92	87382366
Les Clairières de Verneuil		Transilien Line J (Paris-Saint-Lazare)								5	Verneuil-sur-Seine	78	87386664
Les Essarts-le-Roi					Transilien Line N (Paris-Montparnasse)					5	Les Essarts-le-Roi	78	87393280
Les Mureaux		Transilien Line J (Paris-Saint-Lazare)								5	Les Mureaux	78	87386680
Les Vallées				Transilien Line L (Paris-Saint-Lazare)						3	La Garenne-Colombes	92	87386300
Liancourt-Saint-Pierre		Transilien Line J (Paris-Saint-Lazare)								100	Liancourt-Saint-Pierre	60	87381210
Limay		Transilien Line J (Paris-Saint-Lazare)								5	Limay	78	87381582
Livry-sur-Seine							Transilien Line R (Paris-Gare-de-Lyon)			5	Livry-sur-Seine	77	87682401
Lizy-sur-Ourcq						Transilien Line P (Paris-Est)				5	Lizy-sur-Ourcq	77	87116632
Longueville						Transilien Line P (Paris-Est)				5	Longueville	77	87116137
Louveciennes				Transilien Line L (Paris-Saint-Lazare)						4	Louveciennes	78	87382457
Luzarches	Transilien Line H (Paris-Nord)									5	Luzarches	95	87276576
Maisons-Laffitte				Transilien Line L (Paris-Saint-Lazare)						4	Maisons-Laffitte	78	87386425
Mantes-la-Jolie		Transilien Line J (Paris-Saint-Lazare)			Transilien Line N (Paris-Montparnasse)					5	Mantes-la-Jolie	78	87381509
Mantes-Station		Transilien Line J (Paris-Saint-Lazare)								5	Mantes-la-Jolie	78	87381590
Marchezais – Broué					Transilien Line N (Paris-Montparnasse)					100	Marchezais	28	87393470
Mareil-Marly				Transilien Line L (Paris-Saint-Lazare)						4	Mareil-Marly	78	87382812
Mareil-sur-Mauldre					Transilien Line N (Paris-Montparnasse)					5	Mareil-sur-Mauldre	78	87381715
Mareuil-sur-Ourcq						Transilien Line P (Paris-Est)				100	Mareuil-sur-Ourcq	60	87116665
Marles-en-Brie						Transilien Line P (Paris-Est)				5	La Houssaye-en-Brie	77	87116228
Marly-le-Roi				Transilien Line L (Paris-Saint-Lazare)						4	Marly-le-Roi	78	87382465
Maule					Transilien Line N (Paris-Montparnasse)					5	Maule	78	87381723
Maurecourt		Transilien Line J (Paris-Saint-Lazare)								5	Andrésy	78	87381483
Meaux						Transilien Line P (Paris-Est)				5	Meaux	77	87116103
Melun							Transilien Line R (Paris-Gare-de-Lyon)			5	Melun	77	87682005
Mériel	Transilien Line H (Paris-Nord)									5	Mériel	95	87276675
Méry-sur-Oise	Transilien Line H (Paris-Nord)									5	Méry-sur-Oise	95	87276667
Meudon					Transilien Line N (Paris-Montparnasse)					3	Meudon	92	87393108
Meulan – Hardricourt		Transilien Line J (Paris-Saint-Lazare)								5	Hardricourt	78	87381830
Mitry–Claye			Transilien Line K (Paris-Nord)							5	Mitry-Mory	77	87271528
Montargis							Transilien Line R (Paris-Gare-de-Lyon)			100	Montargis	45	87684001
Montereau							Transilien Line R (Paris-Gare-de-Lyon)			5	Montereau-Fault-Yonne	77	87682302
Montfort-l'Amaury – Méré					Transilien Line N (Paris-Montparnasse)					5	Méré	78	87393892
Montgeroult – Courcelles		Transilien Line J (Paris-Saint-Lazare)								5	Montgeroult	95	87381160
Montigny–Beauchamp	Transilien Line H (Paris-Nord)									4	Beauchamp	95	87276089
Montigny-sur-Loing							Transilien Line R (Paris-Gare-de-Lyon)			5	Montigny-sur-Loing	77	87684100
Montreuil				Transilien Line L (Paris-Saint-Lazare)						4	Versailles	78	87382879
Montsoult–Maffliers	Transilien Line H (Paris-Nord)									5	Montsoult	95	87276493
Moret–Veneux-les-Sablons							Transilien Line R (Paris-Gare-de-Lyon)			5	Moret-Loing-et-Orvanne	77	87682278
Mormant						Transilien Line P (Paris-Est)				5	Mormant	77	87116087
Mortcerf						Transilien Line P (Paris-Est)				5	Mortcerf	77	87116244
Mouroux						Transilien Line P (Paris-Est)				5	Mouroux	77	87116285
Nangis						Transilien Line P (Paris-Est)				5	Nangis	77	87116095
Nanterre-Université				Transilien Line L (Paris-Saint-Lazare)						3	Nanterre	92	87386318
Nanteuil-le-Haudouin			Transilien Line K (Paris-Nord)							100	Nanteuil-le-Haudouin	60	87271577
Nanteuil – Saâcy						Transilien Line P (Paris-Est)				5	Saâcy-sur-Marne	77	87116558
Nemours–Saint-Pierre							Transilien Line R (Paris-Gare-de-Lyon)			5	Saint-Pierre-lès-Nemours	77	87684126
Neuville-Université				Transilien Line L (Paris-Saint-Lazare)						5	Neuville-sur-Oise	95	87334482
Nézel – Aulnay					Transilien Line N (Paris-Montparnasse)					5	Nézel	78	87381731
Nogent-l'Artaud – Charly						Transilien Line P (Paris-Est)				100	Nogent-l'Artaud	02	87116566
Nointel - Mours	Transilien Line H (Paris-Nord)									5	Nointel	95	87276758
Noisy-le-Roi				Transilien Line L (Paris-Saint-Lazare)						5	Noisy-le-Roi	78	87393876
Orgerus – Béhoust					Transilien Line N (Paris-Montparnasse)					5	Orgerus	78	87393447
Ormoy-Villers			Transilien Line K (Paris-Nord)							100	Ormoy-Villers	60	87271585
Osny		Transilien Line J (Paris-Saint-Lazare)								5	Osny	95	87381145
Persan–Beaumont	Transilien Line H (Paris-Nord)									5	Persan	95	87276469
Pierrelaye	Transilien Line H (Paris-Nord)									5	Pierrelaye	95	87276097
Plaisir – Grignon					Transilien Line N (Paris-Montparnasse)					5	Plaisir	78	87393421
Plaisir – Les Clayes					Transilien Line N (Paris-Montparnasse)					5	Plaisir	78	87393629
Poissy		Transilien Line J (Paris-Saint-Lazare)								5	Poissy	78	87386573
Pont Cardinet				Transilien Line L (Paris-Saint-Lazare)						1	Paris	75	87381111
Pont Petit	Transilien Line H (Paris-Nord)									5	Saint-Ouen-l'Aumône	95	87276154
Pontoise	Transilien Line H (Paris-Nord)	Transilien Line J (Paris-Saint-Lazare)								5	Pontoise	95	87276139
Précy-sur-Oise	Transilien Line H (Paris-Nord)									100	Précy-sur-Oise	60	87276410
Presles–Courcelles	Transilien Line H (Paris-Nord)									5	Presles	95	87276501
Provins						Transilien Line P (Paris-Est)				5	Provins	77	87116160
Puteaux				Transilien Line L (Paris-Saint-Lazare)				Transilien Line U		3	Puteaux	92	87382382
Rambouillet					Transilien Line N (Paris-Montparnasse)					5	Rambouillet	78	87393314
Rosny-sur-Seine		Transilien Line J (Paris-Saint-Lazare)								5	Rosny-sur-Seine	78	87415885
Saint-Cloud				Transilien Line L (Paris-Saint-Lazare)				Transilien Line U		3	Saint-Cloud	92	87382358
Saint-Cyr					Transilien Line N (Paris-Montparnasse)			Transilien Line U		5	Saint-Cyr-l'École	78	87393223
Saint-Denis	Transilien Line H (Paris-Nord)									3	Saint-Denis	93	87271015
Saint-Germain-en-Laye-Bel-Air – Fourqueux				Transilien Line L (Paris-Saint-Lazare)						4	Saint-Germain-en-Laye	78	87366922
Saint-Germain-en-Laye–Grande-Ceinture				Transilien Line L (Paris-Saint-Lazare)						4	Saint-Germain-en-Laye	78	87382804
Saint-Leu-d'Esserent	Transilien Line H (Paris-Nord)									100	Saint-Leu-d'Esserent	60	87276402
Saint-Leu-la-Forêt	Transilien Line H (Paris-Nord)									4	Saint-Leu-la-Forêt	95	87276600
Saint-Mammès							Transilien Line R (Paris-Gare-de-Lyon)			5	Saint-Mammès	77	87682294
Saint-Nom-la-Bretèche–Forêt de Marly				Transilien Line L (Paris-Saint-Lazare)						5	L'Étang-la-Ville	78	87382481
Saint-Ouen-l'Aumône	Transilien Line H (Paris-Nord)									5	Saint-Ouen-l'Aumône	95	87276105
Saint-Ouen-l'Aumône-Liesse	Transilien Line H (Paris-Nord)									5	Saint-Ouen-l'Aumône	95	87337980
Saint-Ouen-l'Aumône-Quartier de l'Église		Transilien Line J (Paris-Saint-Lazare)								5	Saint-Ouen-l'Aumône	95	87381426
Saint-Quentin-en-Yvelines–Montigny-le-Bretonneux					Transilien Line N (Paris-Montparnasse)			Transilien Line U		5	Montigny-le-Bretonneux	78	87393843
Saint-Rémy-la-Vanne						Transilien Line P (Paris-Est)				5	Saint-Rémy-la-Vanne	77	87116376
Saint-Siméon						Transilien Line P (Paris-Est)				5	Saint-Siméon	77	87116368
Sainte-Colombe–Septveilles						Transilien Line P (Paris-Est)				5	Sainte-Colombe	77	87116178
Sannois		Transilien Line J (Paris-Saint-Lazare)								4	Sannois	95	87276188
Santeuil – Le Perchay		Transilien Line J (Paris-Saint-Lazare)								5	Santeuil	95	87381186
Sarcelles–Saint-Brice	Transilien Line H (Paris-Nord)									4	Saint-Brice-sous-Forêt	95	87276386
Sartrouville				Transilien Line L (Paris-Saint-Lazare)						4	Sartrouville	78	87386417
Seugy	Transilien Line H (Paris-Nord)									5	Seugy	95	87272039
Sèvres-Rive-Gauche					Transilien Line N (Paris-Montparnasse)					3	Sèvres	92	87393124
Sèvres–Ville-d'Avray				Transilien Line L (Paris-Saint-Lazare)				Transilien Line U		3	Sèvres	92	87382341
Souppes–Château-Landon							Transilien Line R (Paris-Gare-de-Lyon)			5	Souppes-sur-Loing	77	87684217
Suresnes–Mont-Valérien				Transilien Line L (Paris-Saint-Lazare)				Transilien Line U		3	Suresnes	92	87382374
Tacoignières – Richebourg					Transilien Line N (Paris-Montparnasse)					5	Tacoignières	78	87393454
Taverny	Transilien Line H (Paris-Nord)									4	Taverny	95	87276634
Thieux – Nantouillet			Transilien Line K (Paris-Nord)							5	Thieux	77	87272054
Thomery							Transilien Line R (Paris-Gare-de-Lyon)			5	Fontainebleau	77	87682252
Thun-le-Paradis		Transilien Line J (Paris-Saint-Lazare)								5	Meulan-en-Yvelines	78	87381822
Tournan						Transilien Line P (Paris-Est)				5	Tournan-en-Brie	77	87116210
Trappes					Transilien Line N (Paris-Montparnasse)			Transilien Line U		5	Trappes	78	87393835
Trie-Château		Transilien Line J (Paris-Saint-Lazare)								100	Trie-Château	60	87381236
Triel-sur-Seine		Transilien Line J (Paris-Saint-Lazare)								5	Triel-sur-Seine	78	87381806
Trilport						Transilien Line P (Paris-Est)				5	Trilport	77	87116491
Us		Transilien Line J (Paris-Saint-Lazare)								5	Us	95	87381178
Vaires–Torcy						Transilien Line P (Paris-Est)				5	Vaires-sur-Marne	77	87116293
Val d'Argenteuil		Transilien Line J (Paris-Saint-Lazare)								4	Argenteuil	95	87381798
Valmondois	Transilien Line H (Paris-Nord)									5	Butry-sur-Oise	95	87276535
Vanves–Malakoff					Transilien Line N (Paris-Montparnasse)					2	Vanves	92	87391532
Vaucelles	Transilien Line H (Paris-Nord)									4	Taverny	95	87276626
Vaucresson				Transilien Line L (Paris-Saint-Lazare)						4	Vaucresson	92	87382267
Vaux-sur-Seine		Transilien Line J (Paris-Saint-Lazare)								5	Vaux-sur-Seine	78	87381814
Verneuil-l'Étang						Transilien Line P (Paris-Est)				5	Verneuil-l'Étang	77	87116079
Vernon–Giverny		Transilien Line J (Paris-Saint-Lazare)								100	Vernon	27	87415604
Vernou-sur-Seine							Transilien Line R (Paris-Gare-de-Lyon)			5	Vernou-la-Celle-sur-Seine	77	87682468
Vernouillet – Verneuil		Transilien Line J (Paris-Saint-Lazare)								5	Verneuil-sur-Seine	78	87386656
Versailles Chantiers					Transilien Line N (Paris-Montparnasse)			Transilien Line U	Transilien Line V	4	Versailles	78	87393009
Versailles Rive Droite				Transilien Line L (Paris-Saint-Lazare)						4	Versailles	78	87382861
Viarmes	Transilien Line H (Paris-Nord)									5	Viarmes	95	87276568
Villaines	Transilien Line H (Paris-Nord)									5	Villaines-sous-Bois	95	87272021
Villennes-sur-Seine		Transilien Line J (Paris-Saint-Lazare)								5	Villennes-sur-Seine	78	87386649
Villepreux – Les Clayes					Transilien Line N (Paris-Montparnasse)					5	Les Clayes-sous-Bois	78	87393413
Villiers – Neauphle – Pontchartrain					Transilien Line N (Paris-Montparnasse)					5	Villiers-Saint-Frédéric	78	87393884
Viroflay Rive Droite				Transilien Line L (Paris-Saint-Lazare)						3	Viroflay	78	87382887
Viroflay Rive Gauche					Transilien Line N (Paris-Montparnasse)					3	Viroflay	78	87393215
Vulaines-sur-Seine – Samoreau							Transilien Line R (Paris-Gare-de-Lyon)			5	Vulaines-sur-Seine	77	87682443

== See also ==
- Transilien
- List of SNCF stations in Île-de-France
- List of RER stations
- List of tram stops in Île-de-France
