= List of SNCF stations in Île-de-France =

This article contains a list of current SNCF railway stations in the Île-de-France region of France (RER stations with no other SNCF service are not included in this list; see the separate list of RER stations).

== Essonne (91) ==
- Angerville
- Dourdan
- Étampes
- Guillerval
- Juvisy
- Massy–Palaiseau
- Massy TGV
- Monnerville

== Hauts-de-Seine (92) ==
- Asnières-sur-Seine
- Bécon-les-Bruyères
- Bellevue
- Bois-Colombes
- Chaville-Rive-Droite
- Chaville-Rive-Gauche
- Clamart
- Clichy–Levallois
- Colombes
- Courbevoie
- La Défense
- Garches-Marnes-la-Coquette
- La Garenne-Colombes
- Meudon
- Nanterre-Université
- Puteaux
- Saint-Cloud
- Sèvres-Rive-Gauche
- Sèvres–Ville-d'Avray
- Le Stade
- Suresnes–Mont-Valérien
- Le Val-d'Or
- Les Vallées
- Vanves–Malakoff
- Vaucresson

== Paris (75) ==
- Gare d'Austerlitz
- Gare de Bercy
- Gare de l'Est
- Gare de Lyon
- Gare Montparnasse
- Gare du Nord
- Gare Saint-Lazare
- Pont Cardinet

== Seine-et-Marne (77) ==
- Bagneaux-sur-Loing
- Bois-le-Roi
- Bourron-Marlotte-Grez
- Champagne-sur-Seine
- Champbenoist–Poigny
- Changis-Saint-Jean
- Chartrettes
- Chelles–Gournay
- Compans
- Couilly-Saint-Germain-Quincy
- Coulommiers
- Crécy-la-Chapelle
- Crouy-sur-Ourcq
- Dammartin-Juilly-Saint-Mard
- Esbly
- Faremoutiers-Pommeuse
- La Ferté-sous-Jouarre
- Fontainebleau–Avon
- Fontainebleau-Forêt
- Fontaine-le-Port
- La Grande-Paroisse
- Guérard-La Celle-sur-Morin
- Héricy
- Isles-Armentières-Congis
- Lagny-Thorigny
- Livry-sur-Seine
- Lizy-sur-Ourcq
- Longueville
- Marles-en-Brie
- Marne-la-Vallée–Chessy
- Meaux
- Melun
- Mitry–Claye
- Montereau
- Montigny-sur-Loing
- Montry-Condé
- Moret–Veneux-les-Sablons
- Mormant
- Mortcerf
- Mouroux
- Nangis
- Nanteuil-Saâcy
- Nemours – Saint-Pierre
- Provins
- Sainte-Colombe–Septveilles
- Saint-Mammès
- Saint-Siméon
- Souppes – Château-Landon
- Thieux-Nantouillet
- Thomery
- Tournan
- Trilport
- Vaires–Torcy
- Verneuil-l'Étang
- Vernou-sur-Seine
- Villiers-Montbarbin
- Vulaines-sur-Seine-Samoreau

== Seine-Saint-Denis (93) ==
- Aéroport Charles de Gaulle 2 TGV
- Aulnay-sous-Bois
- Épinay–Villetaneuse
- Saint-Denis

== Val-d'Oise (95) ==
- Argenteuil
- Auvers-sur-Oise
- La Barre - Ormesson
- Belloy–Saint-Martin
- Bessancourt
- Boissy-l'Aillerie
- Bouffémont - Moisselles
- Bruyères-sur-Oise
- Cergy-le-Haut
- Cergy-Préfecture
- Cergy-Saint-Christophe
- Cernay
- Champagne-sur-Oise
- Champ de courses d'Enghien
- Chaponval
- Chars
- Cormeilles-en-Parisis
- Deuil-Montmagny
- Domont
- Écouen - Ézanville
- Enghien-les-Bains
- Épluches
- Éragny-Neuville
- Ermont–Eaubonne
- Ermont-Halte
- Franconville-Le Plessis-Bouchard
- Frépillon
- La Frette-Montigny
- Groslay
- Gros Noyer–Saint-Prix
- Herblay
- L'Isle-Adam–Parmain
- Luzarches
- Mériel
- Méry-sur-Oise
- Montgeroult-Courcelles
- Montigny–Beauchamp
- Montsoult–Maffliers
- Neuville-Université
- Nointel - Mours
- Osny
- Persan–Beaumont
- Pierrelaye
- Pontoise
- Pont-Petit
- Presles–Courcelles
- Saint-Leu-la-Forêt
- Saint-Ouen-l'Aumône
- Saint-Ouen-l'Aumône-Liesse
- Saint-Ouen-l'Aumône-Quartier de l'Église
- Sannois
- Santeuil-Le Perchay
- Sarcelles–Saint-Brice
- Seugy
- Taverny
- Us
- Val d'Argenteuil
- Valmondois
- Vaucelles
- Viarmes
- Villaines

== Yvelines (78) ==
- Achères-Ville
- Andrésy
- Aubergenville-Élisabethville
- Beynes
- Bonnières
- Bougival
- Bréval
- La Celle-Saint-Cloud
- Chanteloup-les-Vignes
- Les Clairières-de-Verneuil
- Coignières
- Conflans-Fin-d'Oise
- Conflans-Sainte-Honorine
- Épône-Mézières
- Les Essarts-le-Roi
- L'Étang-la-Ville
- Fontenay-le-Fleury
- Garancières-La Queue
- Gargenville
- Gazeran
- Houdan
- Houilles–Carrières-sur-Seine
- Issou-Porcheville
- Juziers
- Limay
- Louveciennes
- Maisons-Laffitte
- Mantes-la-Jolie
- Mantes-Station
- Mareil-sur-Mauldre
- Marly-le-Roi
- Maule
- Maurecourt
- Meulan-Hardricourt
- Montfort-l'Amaury-Méré
- Montreuil
- Les Mureaux
- Nézel-Aulnay
- Orgerus-Béhoust
- Le Perray
- Plaisir-Grignon
- Plaisir-Les Clayes
- Poissy
- Rambouillet
- Rosny-sur-Seine
- Saint-Cyr
- Saint-Nom-la-Bretèche–Forêt de Marly
- Saint-Quentin-en-Yvelines–Montigny-le-Bretonneux
- Sartrouville
- Tacoignières-Richebourg
- Thun-le-Paradis
- Trappes
- Triel-sur-Seine
- Vaux-sur-Seine
- Vernouillet-Verneuil
- La Verrière
- Versailles-Chantiers
- Versailles Rive Droite
- Villennes-sur-Seine
- Villepreux-Les Clayes
- Villiers-Neauphle-Pontchartrain
- Viroflay Rive Droite
- Viroflay Rive Gauche

== See also ==
- SNCF
- List of SNCF stations for SNCF stations in other regions
- List of Transilien stations
