= Bouffémont–Moisselles station =

French railway station

Bouffémont Moisselles
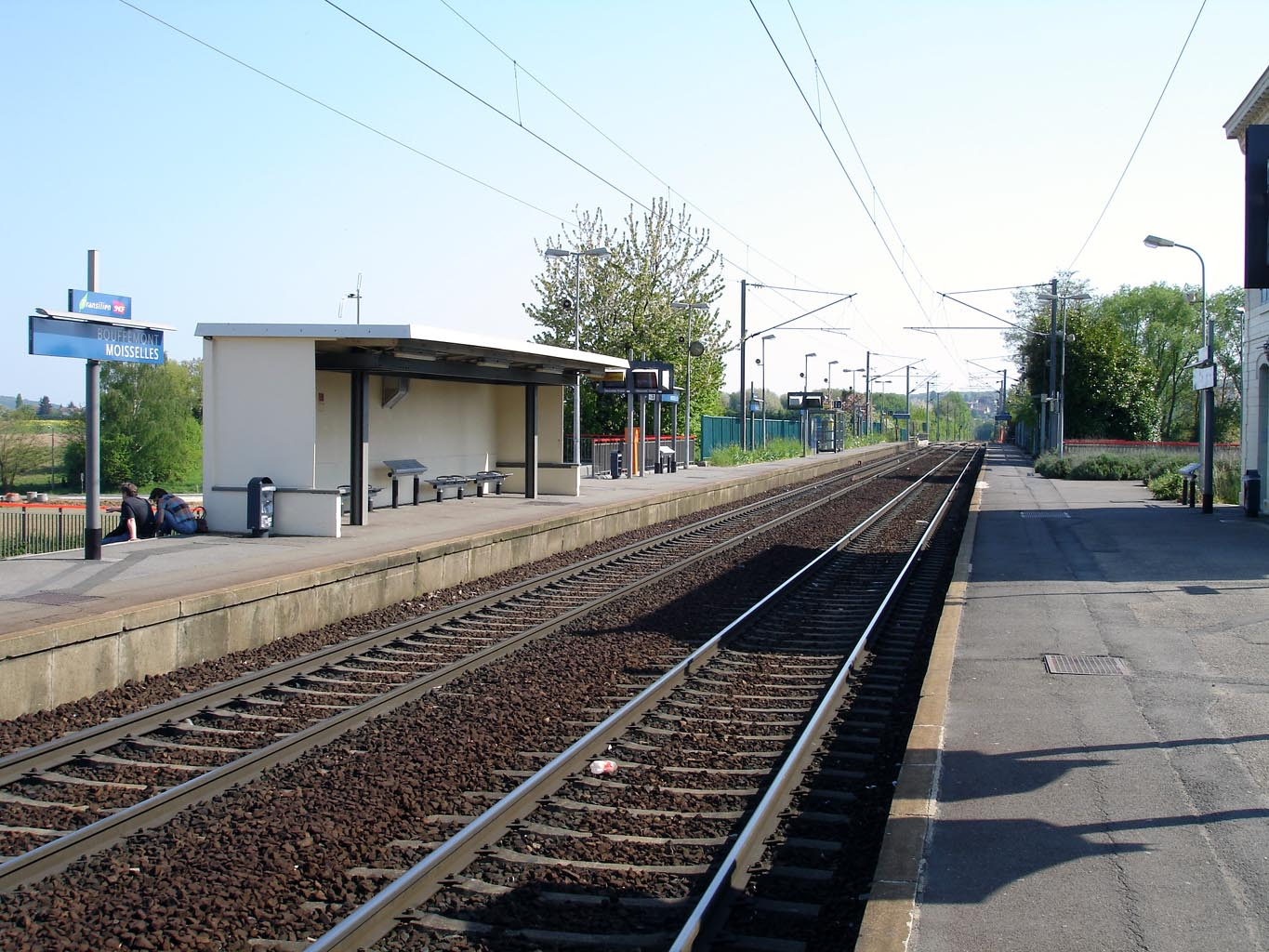
- Platforms

General information
- Location: Bouffémont, France
- Coordinates: 49°02′43″N 2°19′22″E
- Owner: SNCF
- Line: Épinay-Villetaneuse–Le Tréport-Mers railway
- Platforms: 2

Construction
- Parking: 150

Other information
- Station code: 87276485
- Fare zone: 5 (Orange Card)

History
- Opened: 1877

Passengers
- 2024: 1,133,662

Services
Preceding station	Transilien	Following station
Domont towards Paris-Nord	Line H	Montsoult–Maffliers towards Persan–Beaumont or Luzarches
Location

Bouffémont–Moisselles is a railway station in Bouffémont (Val d'Oise department), France and also serves nearby Moisselles. It is on the Épinay-Villetaneuse–Le Tréport-Mers railway, which connects the Paris agglomeration with the coastal resort Le Tréport via Beauvais. The station is served by Transilien suburban trains from the Gare du Nord in Paris to Persan-Beaumont and to Luzarches. The annual number of passengers was 1.1 million in 2024. The station has 150 parking spaces. The line from Épinay-Villetaneuse to Persan-Beaumont via Montsoult was opened by the Compagnie des chemins de fer du Nord (Nord Railway Company) in 1877.

== Bus connections ==
- Vallée de Montmorency : Vallée de Montmorency: 1520
