= Écouen–Ézanville station =

French railway station

Écouen–Ézanville
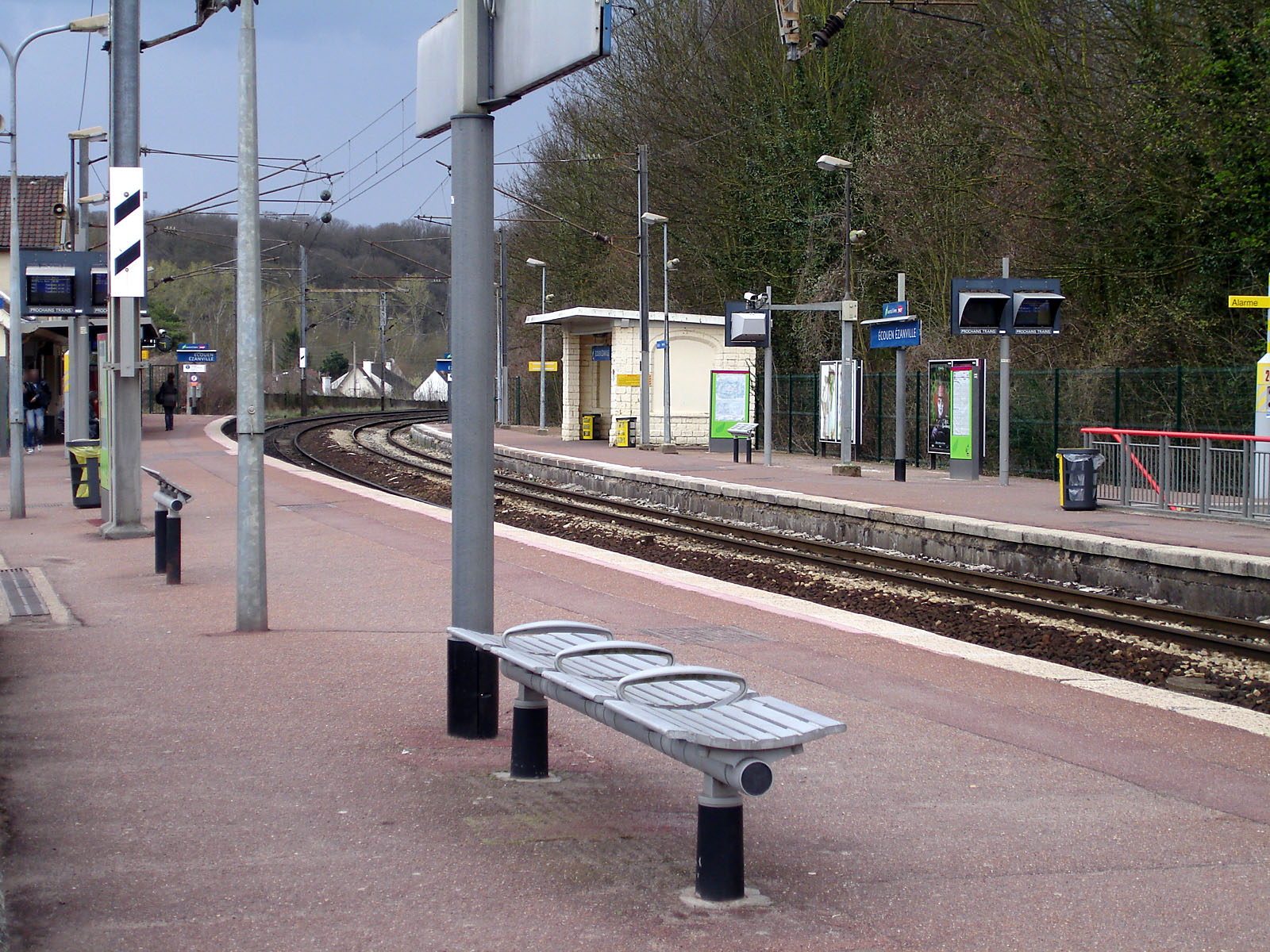

General information
- Location: Ézanville, France
- Coordinates: 49°01′22″N 2°21′47″E
- Owner: SNCF
- Line: Épinay-Villetaneuse–Le Tréport-Mers railway
- Platforms: 2 platforms and an inner quay

Construction
- Parking: 300

Other information
- Station code: 87276394
- Fare zone: 4

History
- Opened: 1877

Passengers
- 2024: 1,912,907

Services
Preceding station	Transilien	Following station
Sarcelles–Saint-Brice towards Paris-Nord	Line H	Domont towards Persan–Beaumont or Luzarches
Location

Écouen–Ézanville is a railway station in Ézanville (Val d'Oise department), France. It is on the Épinay-Villetaneuse–Le Tréport-Mers railway, which connects the Paris agglomeration with the coastal resort Le Tréport via Beauvais. The station is served by Transilien suburban trains from the Gare du Nord in Paris to Persan-Beaumont and to Luzarches. The annual number of passengers was 1,912,907 in 2024. The station has 300 parking spaces. The line from Épinay-Villetaneuse to Persan-Beaumont via Montsoult was opened by the Compagnie des chemins de fer du Nord (Nord Railway Company) in 1877.

== Bus routes ==
- RATP : RATP Bus: 269
- Vallée de Montmorency : Vallée de Montmorency: 1516 1517
