= Vallée de Montmorency bus network =

Public transport network in Val-d'Oise, France

Vallée de Montmorency
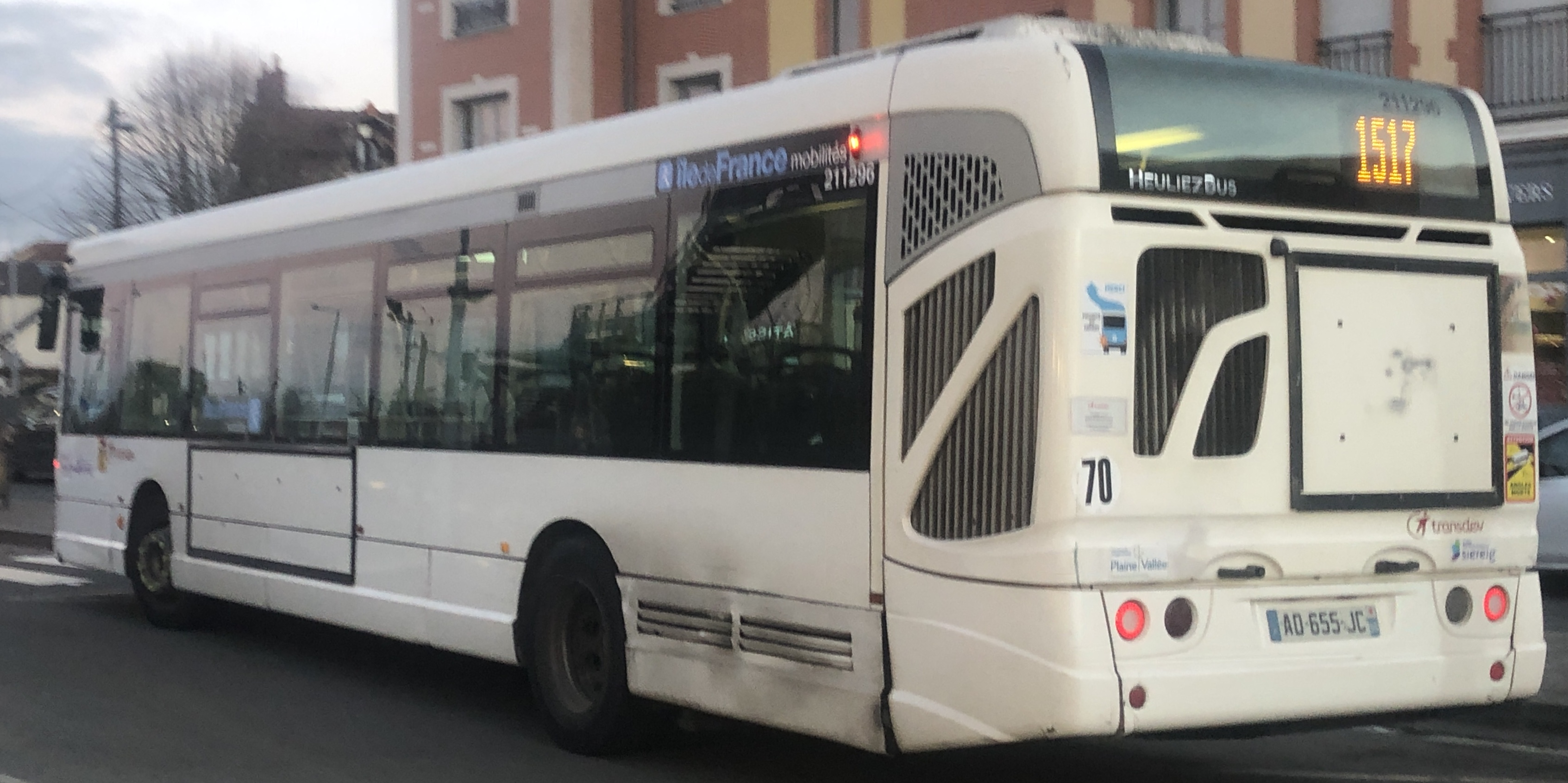
- Heuliez GX 327 n°211296 of line 1517 at Domont station.
- Parent: Île-de-France Mobilités
- Founded: August 1, 2021
- Service area: Seine-Saint-Denis: (Épinay-sur-Seine); Val-d'Oise: (Andilly, Argenteuil, Attainville, Bouffémont, Deuil-la-Barre, Domont, Eaubonne, Écouen, Enghien-les-Bains, Ermont, Ézanville, Groslay, Margency, Moisselles, Montlignon, Montmorency, Piscop, Saint-Brice-sous-Forêt, Saint-Gratien, Saint-Prix, Sarcelles, Soisy-sous-Montmorency)
- Routes: 1510 1511 1512 1513 1514; 1515 1516 1517 1518 1519; 1520 1521 1527 1533 1537
- Operator: Transdev (Transdev Valmy)
- Website: Vallée de Montmorency website

Vallée de Montmorency (formerly: Valmy) is a French bus network run by Île-de-France Mobilités and Communauté d'agglomération Plaine Vallée. The network is operated by Transdev through his subsidiary Transdev Valmy from August 1, 2021.

It consists of 15 lines which mainly serve the communities of the vallée de Montmorency. The network is also completed with two night lines and a demand-responsive transport.

== History ==
The network was created in the 1950s as Valmy, initialism using the name of vallée de Montmorency. It mainly served the municipalities of Andilly, Enghien-les-Bains, Montmorency, Saint-Gratien, Sarcelles and Soisy-sous-Montmorency.

== Network development ==
=== Progressive developments ===
In June 1999, a project to create a line 39 aimed at connecting the Pierrefitte - Stains station to l'Hôtel de Ville de Montmagny was abandoned. The planned route was finally taken over in January 2000 by shuttles from the RATP ex-line 254.

On August 30, 2010, the Sunday lines were restructured. The red line was integrated into the line 14, the yellow line into the line 15A, the green line into the line 15M, and the blue line into the line 110. (Note: Line 110 now corresponds, after restructuring, to lines 10 and 11.)

On November 3, 2014, the line 14 saw its offer restructured following the increase in the line's ridership.

==== Tramway Line 5 ====
When the Tramway Line T5 opened on July 29, 2013, line 37 was extended to Les Cholettes via Groslay station and Sarcelles - ZAC des Monts.

==== Tramway Line 8 ====
In order to support the commissioning of the Tramway Line T8, five lines of the network saw their commercial service affected.

==== Grand Paris des Bus ====
As part of the operation called Grand Paris des Buses led by Île-de-France Mobilités, three lines of the network benefited from reinforcement from August 27, 2018.

=== Opening to the competition ===
Following the opening of public transport to competition in Île-de-France, the Valmy bus network became Vallée de Montmorency on August 1, 2021, corresponding to public service delegation number 5 established by Île-de-France Mobilités. An invitation to tender was therefore launched by the organizing authority in order to designate a company which will succeed the operation of Transdev Transports du Val-d'Oise (Transdev TVO) for a period of seven years. It is finally Transdev, via his society Transdev Valmy, who was designated during the board of directors on February 11, 2021. At the time of its opening to competition, the network consisted of lines 10, 11, 12, 13, 14, 15, 16, 33 (SoisyBus) and 37 of the former Valmy bus network, as well as lines 30-13, 30-39, 38-02, 38-03 and 38-05 of the former Valbus and Parisis bus networks operated by Les Cars Rose and Les Cars Lacroix.

On August 22, 2022, originally scheduled on March 7, 2022, lines 12 and 13 are modified and lines 17 and 27 are created. Line 17 took over the Écouen shuttle from line 13 as well as the Dobus, urban service from Domont while line 27 connects the Eaubonne hospital to the Garges - Sarcelles station, thus replacing part of the section of line 95.02 of the Busval d'Oise network. Finally, two Bus Soirée lines are created respectively in Domont and Écouen.

==== Network renaming ====
Since August 28, 2023, the network is one of the first to apply the new principle of unique regional numbering planned by Île-de-France Mobilités, removing duplicates. The correspondence between old and new numbers is as follows:

Network renaming
Old	New
10	1510
11	1511
12	1512
13	1513
14	1514
15	1515
16	1516
17	1517
30-13	1518
30-39	1519
38-02	1520
38-03	1521
27	1527
33 (SoisyBus)	1533
37	1537

== Routes ==
=== Main routes ===
Image	Line	First direction	Second direction
	1510	Gare d'Ermont-Eaubonne	Soisy-sous-Montmorency — Parc des Sources
	1511	Gare Saint-Gratien	Soisy-sous-Montmorency — Docteur Schweitzer
	1512	Gare d'Ermont-Eaubonne	Montmorency — La Chênée; Gare de Domont
	1513	Gare d'Enghien-les-Bains	Montmorency — La Chênée
	1514	Gare d'Enghien-les-Bains	Gare d'Ermont-Eaubonne
	1515	Gare d'Enghien-les-Bains	Gare d'Épinay-Villetaneuse; Montmorency — La Chênée
	1516	Gare d'Enghien-les-Bains	Gare de Saint-Gratien; Gare d'Argenteuil
	1517	Gare de Domont	Domont — Carrefour d'Ombreval (school days only); Écouen — Maillol
	1518	Gare de Sarcelles - Saint-Brice	Piscop — Mairie
	1519	Gare de Sarcelles - Saint-Brice	Saint-Brice-sous-Forêt — Rougemonts - Liberté
	1520	Attainville — Mairie	Montmorency — Lycée
	1521	Gare du Gros Noyer	Saint-Prix — Léon Cordier
	1527	Gare de Garges - Sarcelles	Eaubonne — Hôpital Simone-Veil
	1533	Gare du Champ de courses d'Enghien	Soisy-sous-Montmorency — Parc des Sources
	1537	Gare d'Épinay-sur-Seine	Sarcelles — Les Flanades

=== Night routes ===
The network is also completed by two night lines named Soirée Domont and Soirée Écouen-Ézanville.

Image	Line
	Soirée Domont
	Soirée Écouen-Ézanville

=== Demand-responsive transport ===
The network also operates a demand-responsive transport named TàD Eaubonne-Domont.

Image	Line
	TàD Eaubonne-Domont

== See also ==
- Île-de-France Mobilités
- Île-de-France tramway Line 5
- Île-de-France tramway Line 8
