= Domont station =

French railway station

Coordinates: 49°01′58″N 2°20′15″E

Domont
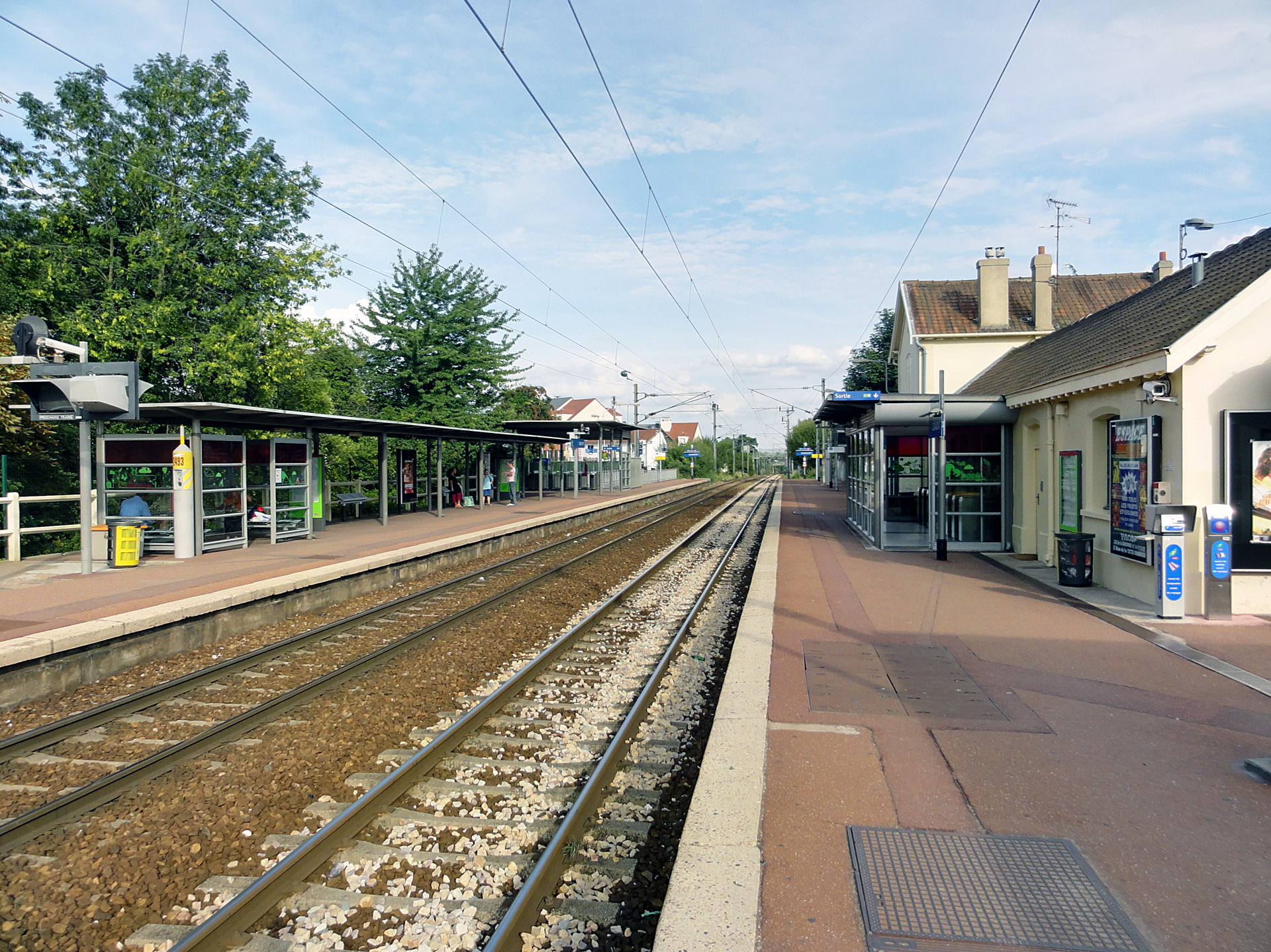

General information
- Location: Domont, France
- Owner: SNCF
- Line: Épinay-Villetaneuse–Le Tréport-Mers railway
- Platforms: 2 outer platforms
- Tracks: 2

Construction
- Depth: 3 m (9.8 ft)
- Parking: 509

Other information
- Station code: 87276436
- Fare zone: 4

History
- Opened: 1877

Passengers
- 2024: 2,763,059

Services
Preceding station	Transilien	Following station
Écouen - Ézanville towards Paris-Nord	Line H	Bouffémont - Moisselles towards Persan–Beaumont or Luzarches
Location

The Domont Station is a railway station in Domont in the Val d'Oise department, France. It is on the Épinay-Villetaneuse–Le Tréport-Mers railway. The station is used by Transilien line H trains from Paris to Persan-Beaumont and Luzarches. The annual number of passengers was 2,763,059 in 2024. The station has 509 free parking spaces.

== History ==
The Nord Company opened the line from Épinay to Persan-Beaumont via Montsoult in 1877.
