= Ermont Halte station =

Railway station in Ermont, France

Ermont Halte
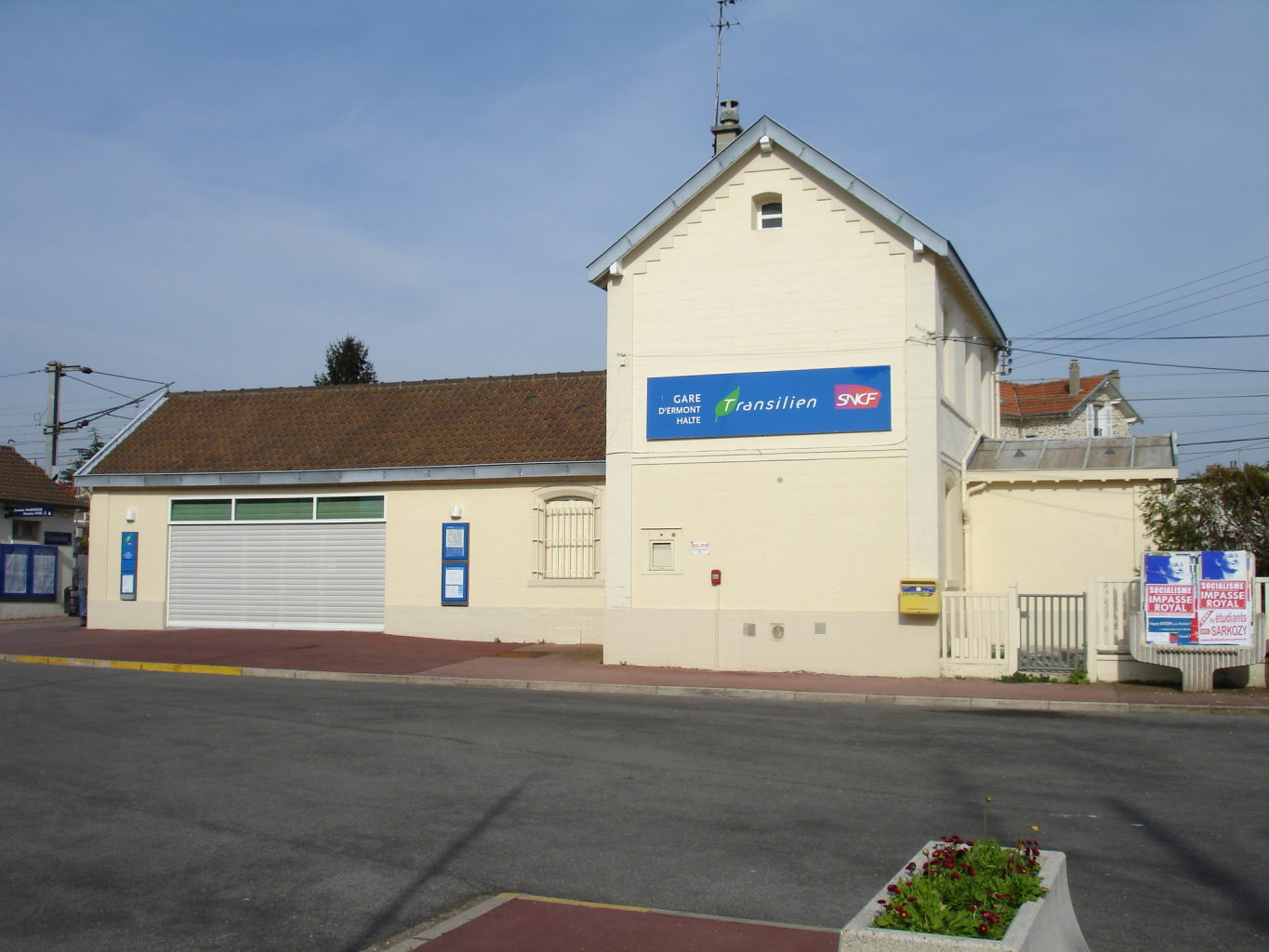
- The station in 2007

General information
- Location: Ermont, France
- Coordinates: 48°59′23″N 2°15′48″E
- Owner: SNCF
- Line: Ermont-Eaubonne–Valmondois railway
- Platforms: 2
- Tracks: 2

Construction
- Parking: 200

Other information
- Station code: 87276584
- Fare zone: 4

History
- Opened: 1876
- Electrified: 1970

Passengers
- 2024: 1,065,645

Services
Preceding station	Transilien	Following station
Ermont–Eaubonne towards Paris-Nord	Line H	Gros Noyer–Saint-Prix towards Persan–Beaumont
Location

Ermont-Halte is a railway station in the commune of Ermont (Val-d'Oise department), France. The station is served by Transilien Paris Nord (line H) trains from Paris to Persan-Beaumont via Saint-Leu-la-Forêt. In 2024, there were 1.1 million passengers. The station has free parking for 200 vehicles. Ermont-Halte is located on the line from Ermont-Eaubonne to Valmondois, that was opened in 1876. The line was electrified in 1970.

== See also ==
- List of SNCF stations in Île-de-France
