= Transilien Paris-Nord =

Suburban rail network around Paris

Transilien Paris-Nord is one of the sectors in the Paris Transilien suburban rail network. The trains on this sector depart from Gare du Nord in central Paris, and serve the north-west and north-east of Île-de-France region with Transilien lines H and K. Transilien services from Gare du Nord are part of the SNCF Gare du Nord rail network.

== Line H ==
Line H

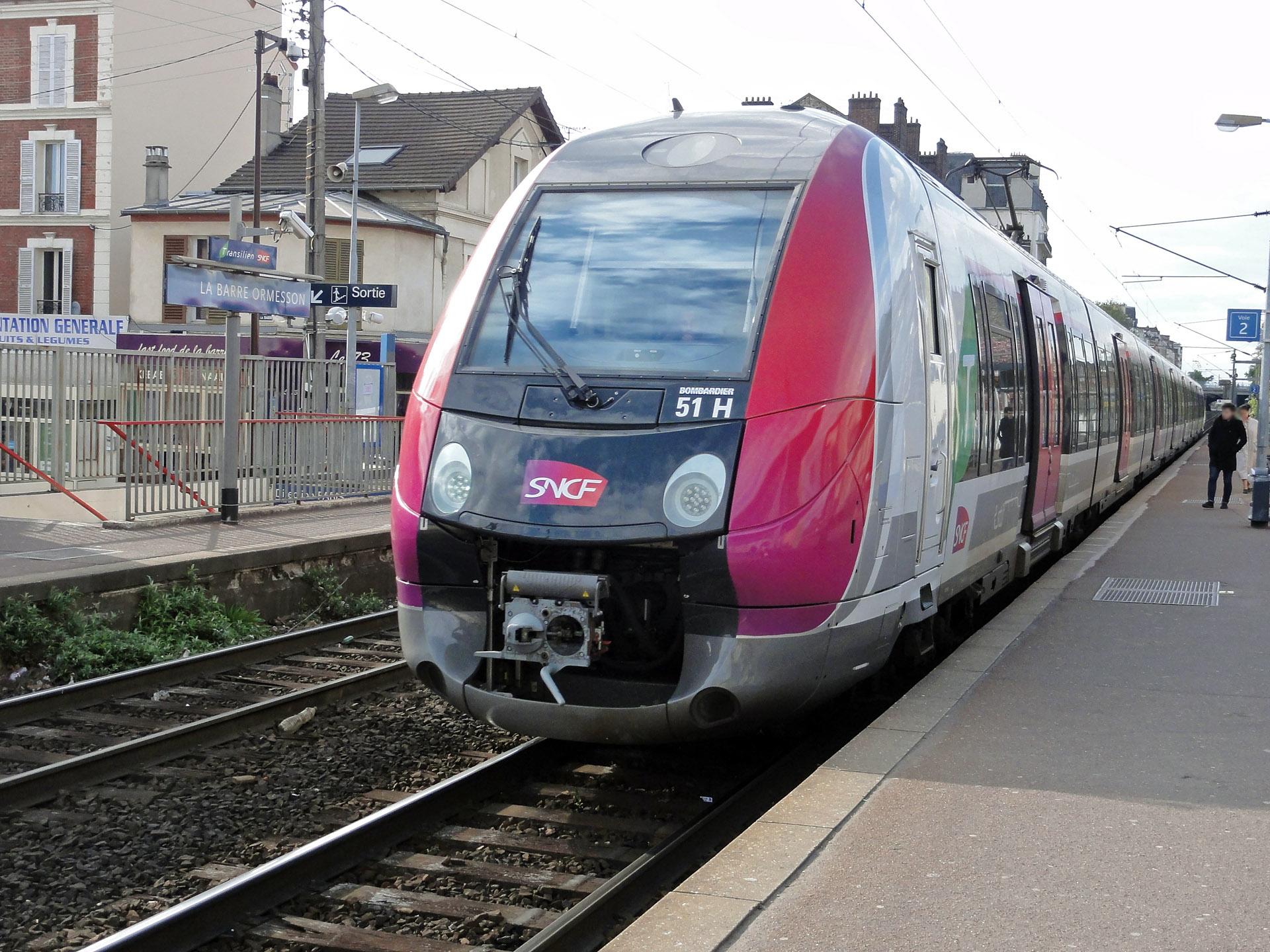

Overview
- Termini: Gare du Nord; Luzarches Pontoise Persan–Beaumont Creil
- Stations: 46

Service
- Type: Commuter rail
- System: Transilien
- Operator: SNCF
- Rolling stock: Z 50000

History
- Opened: 20 June 1846 (first sections); 1 January 2001 (recreated as Line H)

Technical
- Line length: 138 km (86 mi)
- Track gauge: 1,435 mm (4 ft 8 1/2 in) standard gauge

The trains on Line H travel between Gare du Nord in Paris and the north-west of Île-de-France region, with termini in Luzarches, Pontoise, Persan–Beaumont and Creil.

=== List of Line H stations ===
==== Pontoise branch ====
- Gare du Nord
- Saint-Denis station
- Épinay–Villetaneuse station
- La Barre - Ormesson station
- Enghien-les-Bains station
- Champ de courses d'Enghien station
- Ermont–Eaubonne station
- Cernay station
- Franconville – Le Plessis-Bouchard station
- Montigny–Beauchamp station
- Pierrelaye station
- Saint-Ouen-l'Aumône-Liesse station
- Saint-Ouen-l'Aumône station
- Pontoise station

==== Persan-Beaumont West Branch ====
- Ermont-Halte station
- Gros Noyer–Saint-Prix station
- Saint-Leu-la-Forêt station
- Vaucelles station
- Taverny station
- Bessancourt station
- Frépillon station
- Méry-sur-Oise station
- Mériel station
- Valmondois station
- L'Isle-Adam–Parmain station
- Champagne-sur-Oise station
- Persan–Beaumont station

==== Persan-Beaumont East Branch ====
- Deuil - Montmagny station
- Groslay station
- Sarcelles–Saint-Brice station
- Écouen - Ézanville station
- Domont station
- Bouffémont - Moisselles station
- Montsoult–Maffliers station
- Presles–Courcelles station
- Nointel - Mours station
- Persan–Beaumont station

==== Luzarches branch ====
- Villaines station
- Belloy–Saint-Martin station
- Viarmes station
- Seugy station
- Luzarches station

==== Pontoise-Creil branch ====
- Pontoise station
- Saint-Ouen-l'Aumône station
- Épluches station
- Pont-Petit station
- Chaponval station
- Auvers-sur-Oise station
- same route as the Persan-Beaumont west line between Valmondois and Persan-Beaumont
- Bruyères-sur-Oise station
- Boran-sur-Oise station
- Précy-sur-Oise station
- Saint-Leu-d'Esserent station
- Creil station

=== Services ===
Like other Transilien lines, every train service consists of four letters and is called a name of mission, mission code or a name of service. These have been adopted during the Transilien service update of 2004. They are only displayed on timetables and on passenger information display systems.

The first letter corresponds to the destination of the train.

- A: Gare du Nord
- D: Saint-Denis
- E: Ermont-Eaubonne
- F: Saint-Leu-la-Forêt
- L: Luzarches
- M: Montsoult–Maffliers
- O: Pontoise
- P: Persan–Beaumont
- S: Sarcelles–Saint-Brice
- T: Transversal (Creil, Pontoise or Persan–Beaumont) or Ermont-Eaubonne for work missions
- V: Valmondois

The second, third and fourth letters indicate the stations served by the train. A Transilien Line H train calling all stations has an O as the second or the third letter (AOLA, OPOC, POVA, SOGA). An E on the second position indicates that a radial service does not serve nearly all stations on the route (LEMI, LEVI). If the train runs via Montsoult–Maffliers then the third letter is always an M (LOMI, POMA).

Some of the service names may spell backwards when going in "down" direction, which is from Gare du Nord. This usually occurs when the fourth letter is the train's station of origin. Examples: ADDO (to Gare du Nord) spelled backwards is ODDA (to Pontoise), AREV (to Gare du Nord) spelled backwards is VERA (to Valmondois).

Table of services
Destination	Names of services
Gare du Nord	ADDO, ADEL, ADEO, ADEP, AEVI, AFOI, AOGA, AOLA, AOMA, AOSA, APOR, AREP, AREV, ASSA, AVEL, AVOL, AVOP
Saint-Leu-la-Forêt	FOGI
Luzarches	LEMI, LEVA, LOMI
Montsoult–Maffliers	MOSA
Pontoise	ODDA, ODEA, OPOC
Persan–Beaumont	PEDA, PEMI, POMA, PERA, POTA, POVA
Sarcelles–Saint-Brice	SOGA
Transversal	To Pontoise: TIMA, TOLI; To Persan-Beaumont: TEGA, TRIA; To Creil: TSOL, TZEB
Valmondois	VERA, VEVI, VOBA

== Line K ==
Line K

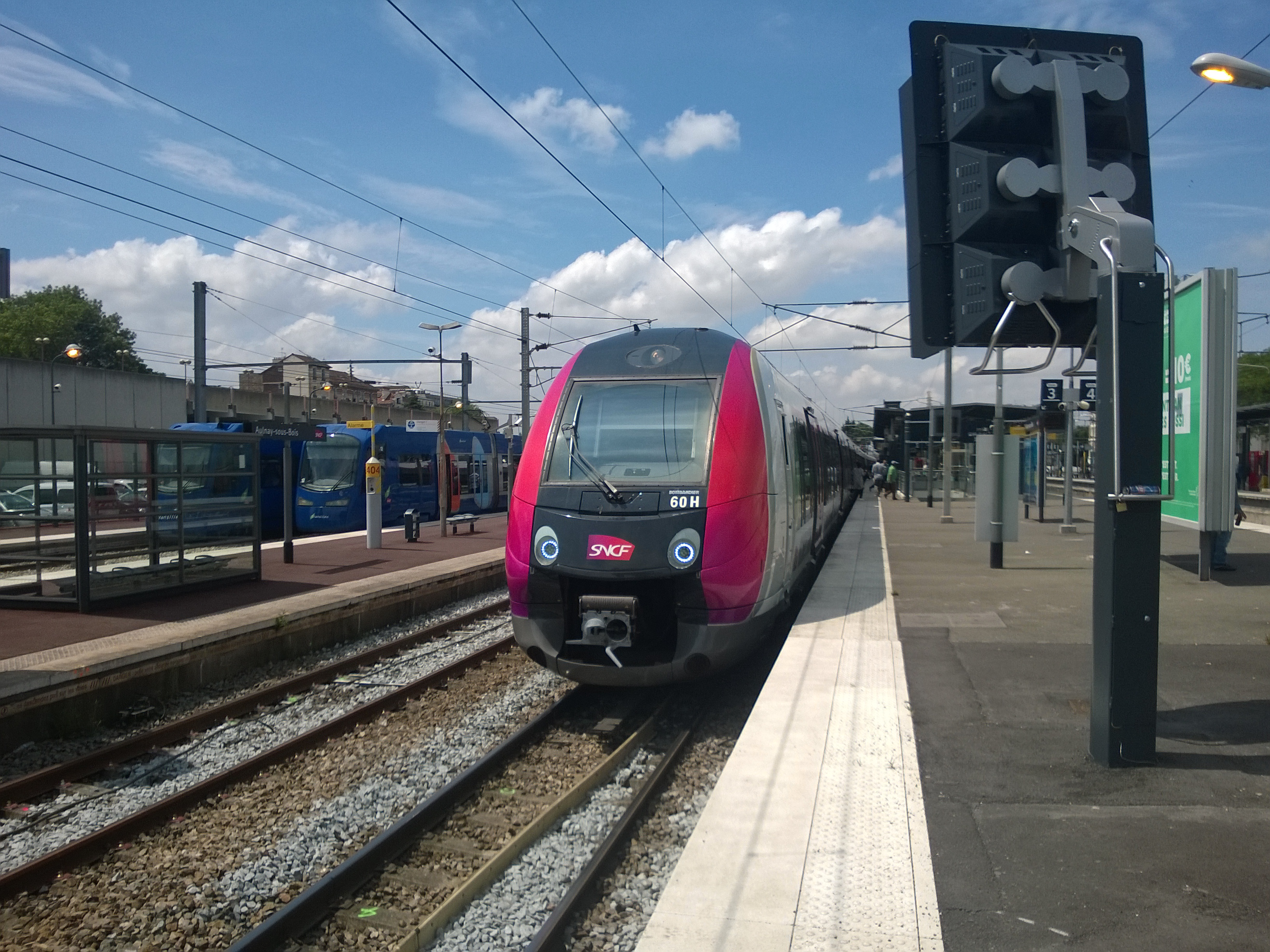

Overview
- Termini: Gare du Nord; Crépy-en-Valois
- Stations: 10

Service
- Type: Commuter rail
- System: Transilien
- Operator: SNCF
- Rolling stock: Z 50000

History
- Opened: 4 June 1860 (first sections); 31 December 2004 (recreated as Line K)

Technical
- Line length: 61 km (38 mi)
- Track gauge: 1,435 mm (4 ft 8 1/2 in)

The trains on Line K serves primarily the north-est of Île-de-France region and travel between Gare du Nord in Paris and Crépy-en-Valois in Hauts-de-France region.

=== List of Line K stations ===
- Gare du Nord
- Aulnay-sous-Bois station
- Mitry–Claye station
- Compans station
- Thieux–Nantouillet station
- Dammartin–Juilly–Saint-Mard station
- Le Plessis–Belleville station
- Nanteuil-le-Haudouin station
- Ormoy–Villers station
- Crépy-en-Valois station

=== Services ===
The four-letter codes of Line K are much simpler. Only one of the four letters have a meaning: this indicates the destination, which is the start of the code. If a four-letter code begins with a K, this means that the train runs to Crépy-en-Valois, but if a four-letter code begins with an A, this means that the train runs to Gare du Nord. Line K assigns names of services to TER services as well for Paris-Laon services (TERL to Laon and TERP to Gare du Nord).

	AEKY KEPY	AIKY KIPY
Gare du Nord	Yes	Yes
Aulnay-sous-Bois	Yes	Yes
Mitry-Claye	Yes	Yes
Compans	Yes	No
Thieux - Nantouilet	Yes	No
Dammartin - Juilly - Saint-Mard	Yes	Yes
Le Plessis-Belleville	Yes	Yes
Nanteuil-le-Haudouin	Yes	Yes
Ormoy-Villers	Yes	No
Crépy-en-Valois	Yes	Yes

== See also ==
- List of Transilien stations
