= Bouffémont =

- Commune
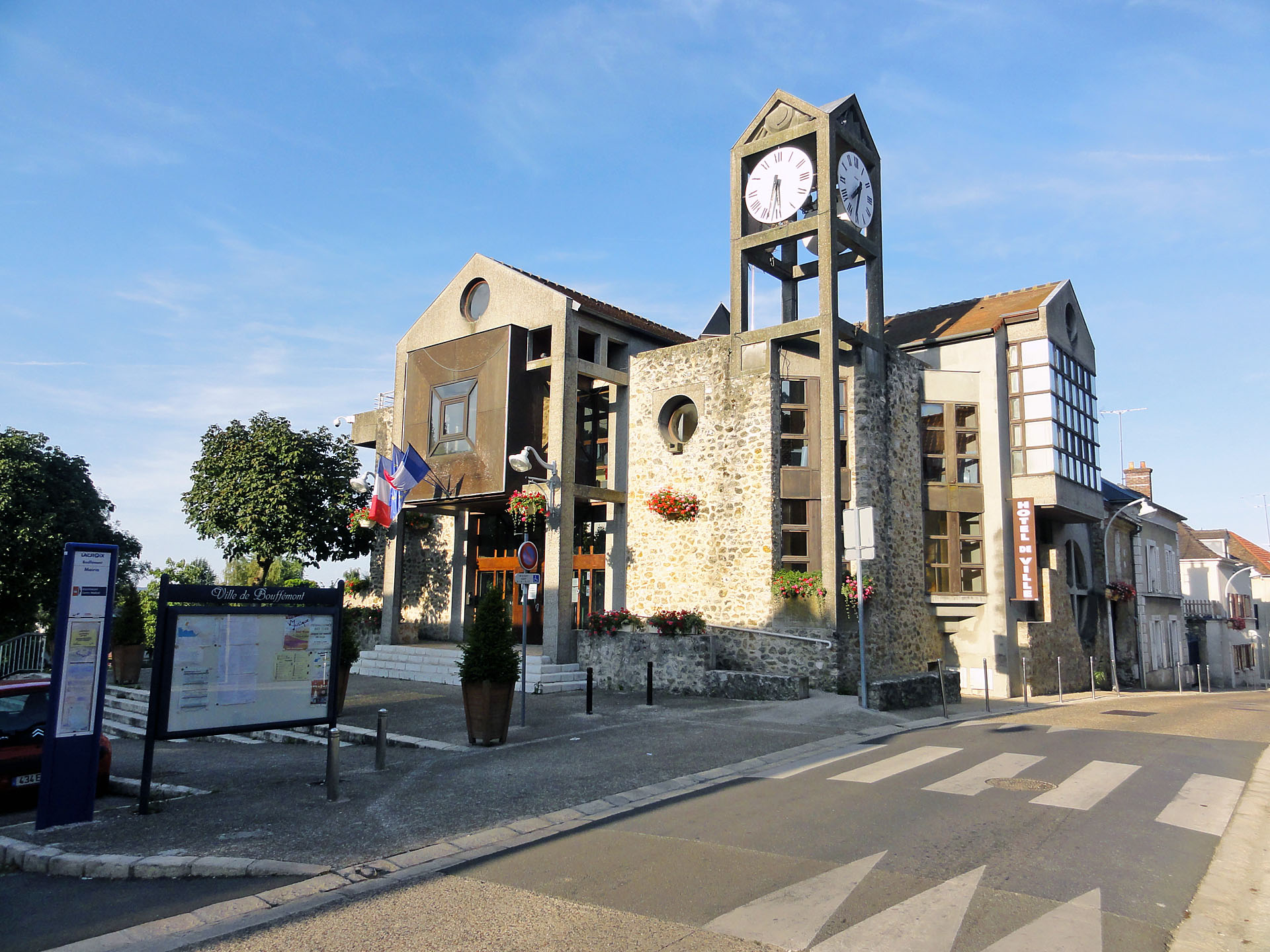
- The town hall of Bouffémont

- Coat of arms
- Location of Bouffémont
- Location within France Location within Île-de-France (region)
- Coordinates: 49°02′39″N 2°18′00″E
- Country: France
- Region: Île-de-France
- Department: Val-d'Oise
- Arrondissement: Sarcelles
- Canton: Domont
- Intercommunality: CA Plaine Vallée

Government
  - Mayor (2020–2026): Michel Lacoux
- Area^{1}: 4.51 km^{2} (1.74 sq mi)
- Population (2023): 6,593
  - Density: 1,460/km^{2} (3,790/sq mi)
- Time zone: UTC+01:00 (CET)
  - Summer (DST): UTC+02:00 (CEST)
- INSEE/Postal code: 95091 /95570
- ^{1} French Land Register data, which excludes lakes, ponds, glaciers > 1 km^{2} (0.386 sq mi or 247 acres) and river estuaries.

Bouffémont (French pronunciation: [bufemɔ̃]) is a commune in the Val-d'Oise department in Île-de-France in northern France.

== Geography ==
The town borders Domont, Moisselles, Baillet-en-France, Chauvry, Saint-Prix and Montlignon.

The city is divided into three districts:

- Hauts-Champs is the district that includes most homes.
- Trait-d'Union is the area between Hauts-Champs and le Village.
- The historic centre of the town is known as le Village.

The city is served by the Bouffémont-Moisselles station, route H of the Transilien Paris-Nord.

== Population ==
Historical population

Year	Pop.	±% p.a.
1793	276	—
1821	351	+0.86%
1841	336	−0.22%
1856	326	−0.20%
1876	324	−0.03%
1896	322	−0.03%
1906	335	+0.40%
1921	358	+0.44%
1926	442	+4.31%
1931	632	+7.41%
1936	626	−0.19%
1946	566	−1.00%

Year	Pop.	±% p.a.
1954	766	+3.85%
1962	635	−2.32%
1968	775	+3.38%
1975	3,154	+22.20%
1982	4,841	+6.31%
1990	5,700	+2.06%
1999	5,701	+0.00%
2007	5,701	+0.00%
2012	6,022	+1.10%
2017	6,327	+0.99%
2023	6,593	+0.69%

Source: EHESS and INSEE

== See also ==
- Communes of the Val-d'Oise department
