= Sarcelles–Saint-Brice station =

French railway station

Sarcelles–Sᵗ-Brice
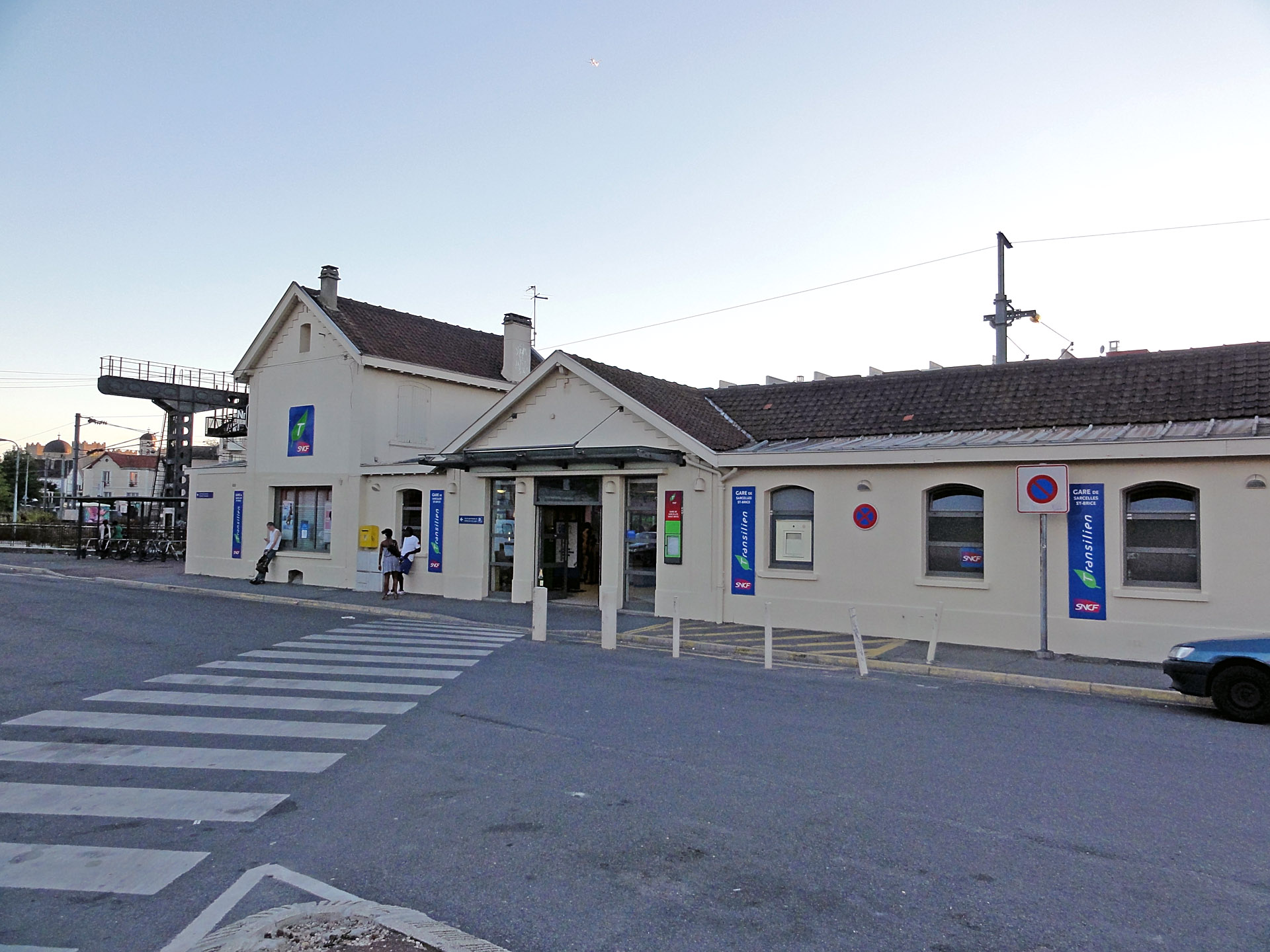

General information
- Location: Saint-Brice-sous-Forêt, France
- Coordinates: 48.995721°N 2.368653°E
- Owner: SNCF
- Line: Épinay-Villetaneuse–Le Tréport-Mers railway
- Platforms: 1 lateral, 1 central platform
- Tracks: 2

Construction
- Depth: 3 m (9.8 ft)
- Parking: 20, 42 and 101 lots

Other information
- Station code: 87276386
- Fare zone: 4 (Orange Card)

History
- Opened: 1877

Passengers
- 2024: 6,141,188

Services
Preceding station	Transilien	Following station
Groslay towards Paris-Nord	Line H	Écouen–Ézanville towards Persan–Beaumont or Luzarches
Location

Sarcelles–Saint-Brice station is a railway station located in Saint-Brice-sous-Forêt, France, which also serves Sarcelles. It is on the Épinay-Villetaneuse–Le Tréport-Mers railway. The station is used by Transilien line H trains from Paris to Persan-Beaumont and Luzarches. In 2002, the station served between 2,500 and 7,500 passengers a day. There are three car parks with 163 spaces in total. The Compagnie des chemins de fer du Nord (Nord company) opened the Épinay–Persan-Beaumont via Montsoult section of the Épinay–Le Tréport line in 1877.
