= Montsoult =

- Commune
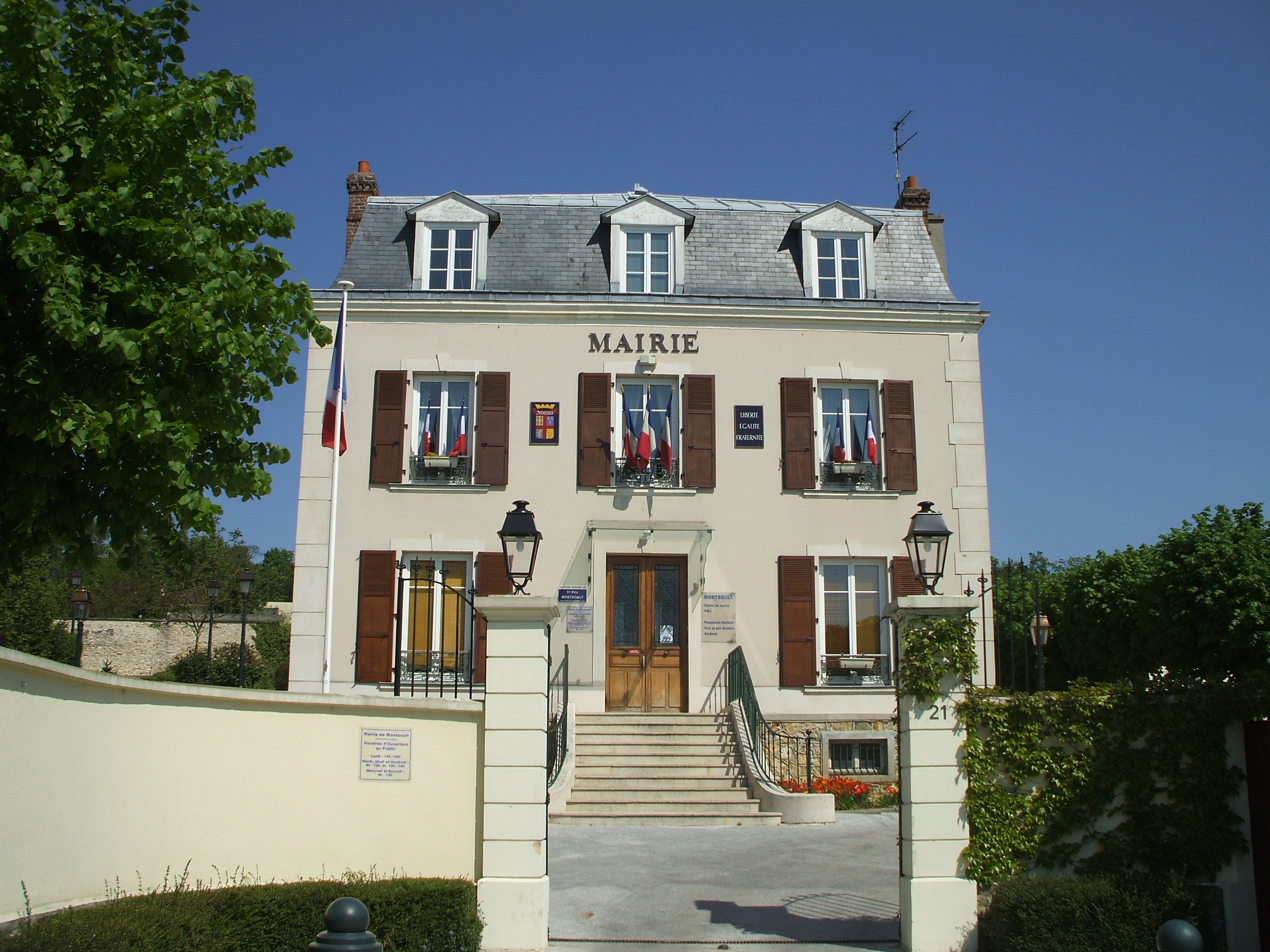
- The town hall of Montsoult

- Coat of arms
- Location of Montsoult
- Location within France Location within Île-de-France (region)
- Coordinates: 49°04′20″N 2°18′41″E
- Country: France
- Region: Île-de-France
- Department: Val-d'Oise
- Arrondissement: Sarcelles
- Canton: Domont
- Intercommunality: Carnelle Pays de France

Government
  - Mayor (2020–2026): Silvio Biello
- Area^{1}: 3.84 km^{2} (1.48 sq mi)
- Population (2023): 4,023
  - Density: 1,050/km^{2} (2,710/sq mi)
- Time zone: UTC+01:00 (CET)
  - Summer (DST): UTC+02:00 (CEST)
- INSEE/Postal code: 95430 /95560
- ^{1} French Land Register data, which excludes lakes, ponds, glaciers > 1 km^{2} (0.386 sq mi or 247 acres) and river estuaries.

Montsoult (French pronunciation: [mɔ̃su]) is a commune in the Val-d'Oise department in Île-de-France in northern France. Montsoult–Maffliers station has rail connections to Persan, Luzarches, Sarcelles and Paris.

== Population ==
Historical population
Year	Pop.	±% p.a.
1968	1,777	—
1975	2,498	+4.99%
1982	3,175	+3.49%
1990	3,523	+1.31%
1999	3,519	−0.01%
2007	3,474	−0.16%
2012	3,396	−0.45%
2017	3,482	+0.50%
2023	4,023	+2.44%
Source: INSEE

== See also ==
- Communes of the Val-d'Oise department
