= Luzarches =

- Commune
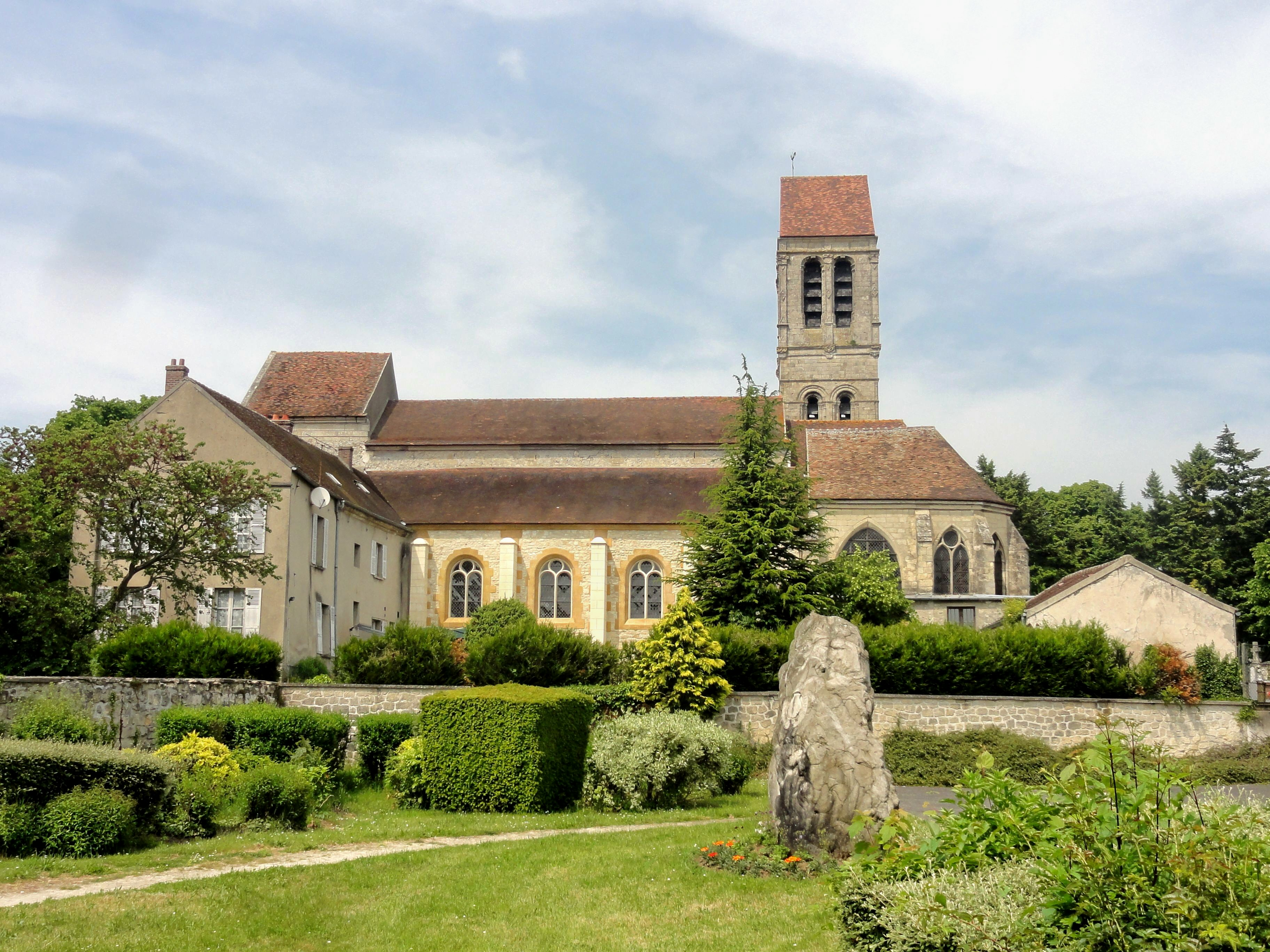
- The Church of Saint-Côme-Saint-Damien, in Luzarches

- Coat of arms
- Location of Luzarches
- Location within France Location within Île-de-France (region)
- Coordinates: 49°06′49″N 2°25′24″E
- Country: France
- Region: Île-de-France
- Department: Val-d'Oise
- Arrondissement: Sarcelles
- Canton: Fosses
- Intercommunality: Carnelle Pays-de-France

Government
  - Mayor (2020–2026): Michel Mansoux
- Area^{1}: 20.49 km^{2} (7.91 sq mi)
- Population (2023): 5,008
  - Density: 244.4/km^{2} (633.0/sq mi)
- Time zone: UTC+01:00 (CET)
  - Summer (DST): UTC+02:00 (CEST)
- INSEE/Postal code: 95352 /95270
- ^{1} French Land Register data, which excludes lakes, ponds, glaciers > 1 km^{2} (0.386 sq mi or 247 acres) and river estuaries.

Luzarches (French pronunciation: [lyzaʁʃ]) is a commune in the Val-d'Oise department in Île-de-France in northern France. Luzarches station has rail connections to Sarcelles and Paris.

Just south of the town is a monument on the D316, which commemorates the closest distance to Paris that German units reached during the advance westwards in September 1914.

== Population ==
Historical population
Year	Pop.	±% p.a.
1968	2,036	—
1975	2,484	+2.88%
1982	2,559	+0.43%
1990	3,371	+3.50%
1999	3,899	+1.63%
2007	4,084	+0.58%
2012	4,401	+1.51%
2017	4,551	+0.67%
2023	5,008	+1.61%
Source: INSEE

== Twin towns ==
- Montrose, Angus, Scotland, United Kingdom has been twinned with Luzarches since 1994.
