= Saint-Ouen-l'Aumône-Quartier de l'Église station =

Railway station in Saint-Ouen-l'Aumône, France

Sᵗ-Ouen l'Aumône Quartier de l'Église
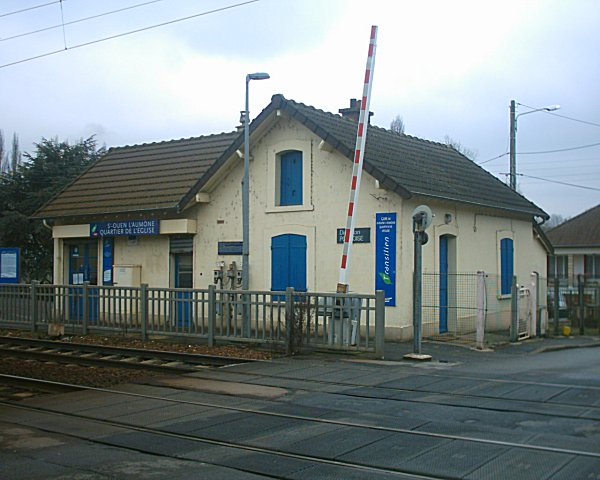

General information
- Location: Saint-Ouen-l'Aumône, Val d'Oise, Île-de-France; France
- Coordinates: 49°2′24″N 2°6′13″E
- Line: Transilien
- Platforms: 2 side platforms
- Tracks: 2

Other information
- Station code: 87381426
- Fare zone: 5

History
- Opened: 1877

Services
Preceding station	Transilien	Following station
Éragny-Neuville towards Paris-St.-Lazare	Line J	Pontoise towards Gisors
Location

Saint-Ouen-l'Aumône-Quartier de l'Église (French pronunciation: [sɛ̃t‿wɛ̃ lomon kaʁtje də leɡliz]) is a railway station in the town of Saint-Ouen-l'Aumône, France. It is situated to the south of the town-centre at the level crossing with the Chaussée Jules César.

The station opened in 1877 and was originally called Saint-Ouen-l'Aumône, but with recent railway line constructions the number of stations in Saint-Ouen-l'Aumône was getting confusing, and as the station was not the principal station for the town and its location was near the town's church, the suffix Quartier de l'Église was added.

The station building is a small cottage situated at the level crossing which is used for ticket selling as well as the transport police. The line serving the station is a two track line with two side platforms. There is no footbridge and a crossover at the level crossing is available to change platforms.

The station is served by one service only, with some trains not continuing to Gisors and terminating at Pontoise.

== See also ==
Railway network in the St-Ouen l'Aumône area
