= Montsoult–Maffliers station =

French railway station

Montsoult–Maffliers
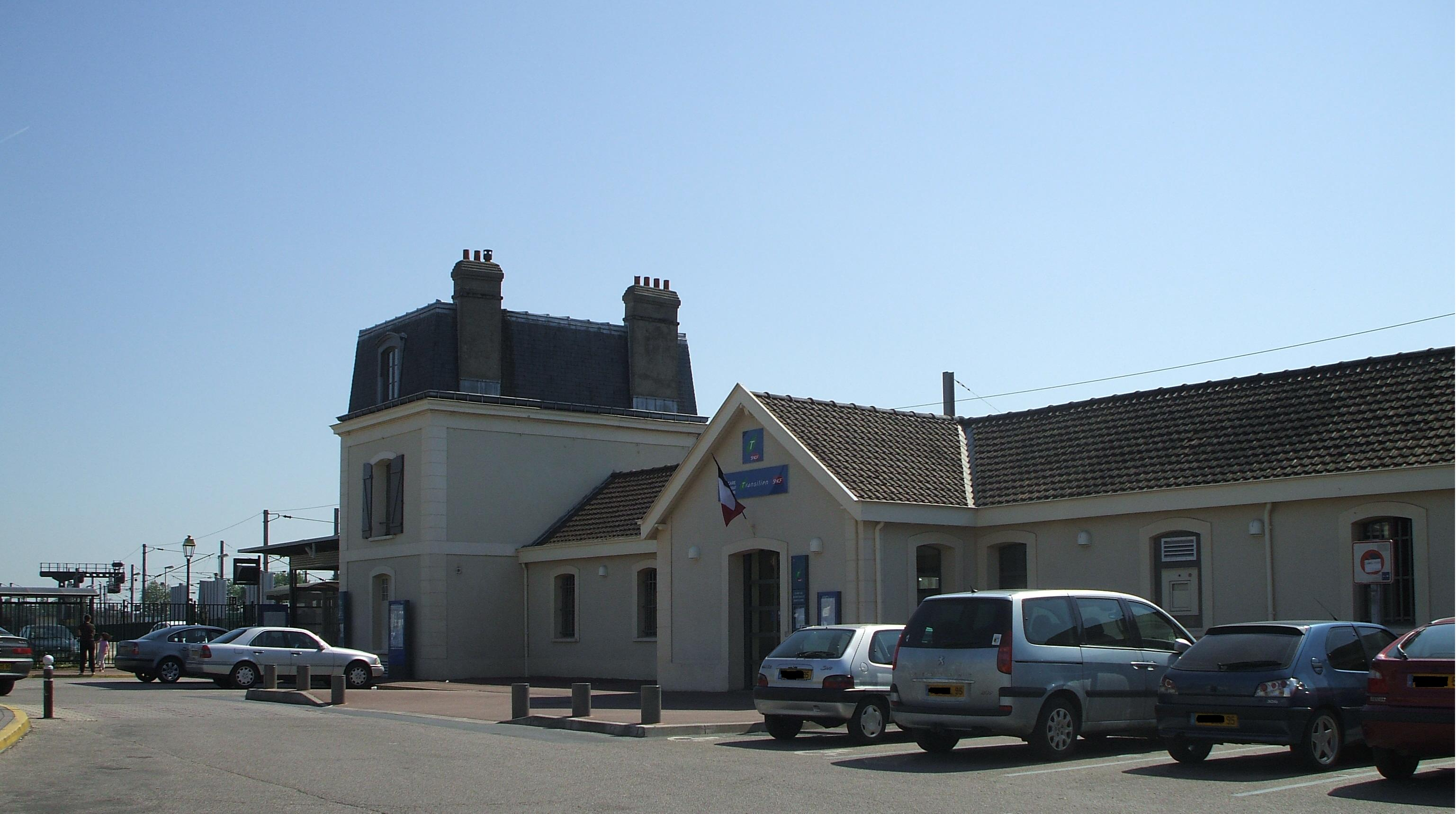

General information
- Location: Montsoult, France
- Coordinates: 49°3′58″N 2°19′22″E
- Owner: SNCF
- Lines: Épinay-Villetaneuse–Le Tréport-Mers railway Montsoult-Maffliers–Luzarches railway
- Platforms: 1 side, 1 island
- Tracks: 3

Construction
- Parking: 69 free, 450 paid

Other information
- Station code: 87276493
- Fare zone: 5

History
- Opened: 5 April 1877

Passengers
- 2024: 1,632,269

Services
Preceding station	Transilien	Following station
Bouffémont–Moisselles towards Paris-Nord	Line H	Presles–Courcelles towards Persan–Beaumont
Bouffémont–Moisselles towards Paris-Nord	Line H	Villaines towards Luzarches
Location

The Montsoult–Maffliers station is a railway station in Montsoult (Val d'Oise department), France which also serves nearby Maffliers. It is on the Épinay-Villetaneuse–Le Tréport-Mers railway and is also the interchange station for the Montsoult-Maffliers – Luzarches spur line. The station is used by Transilien line H trains from Paris to Persan-Beaumont and Luzarches.

In 2024, the station served 1,632,269 passengers. There are 69 free parking spaces and 450 paid spaces.

== History ==
The Compagnie des chemins de fer du Nord (Nord company) opened the Épinay – Persan-Beaumont via Montsoult section of the Épinay – Le Tréport line in 1877, and the Montsoult – Luzarches spur in 1880.
