= Seugy station =

Railway station in Seugy, France

Seugy
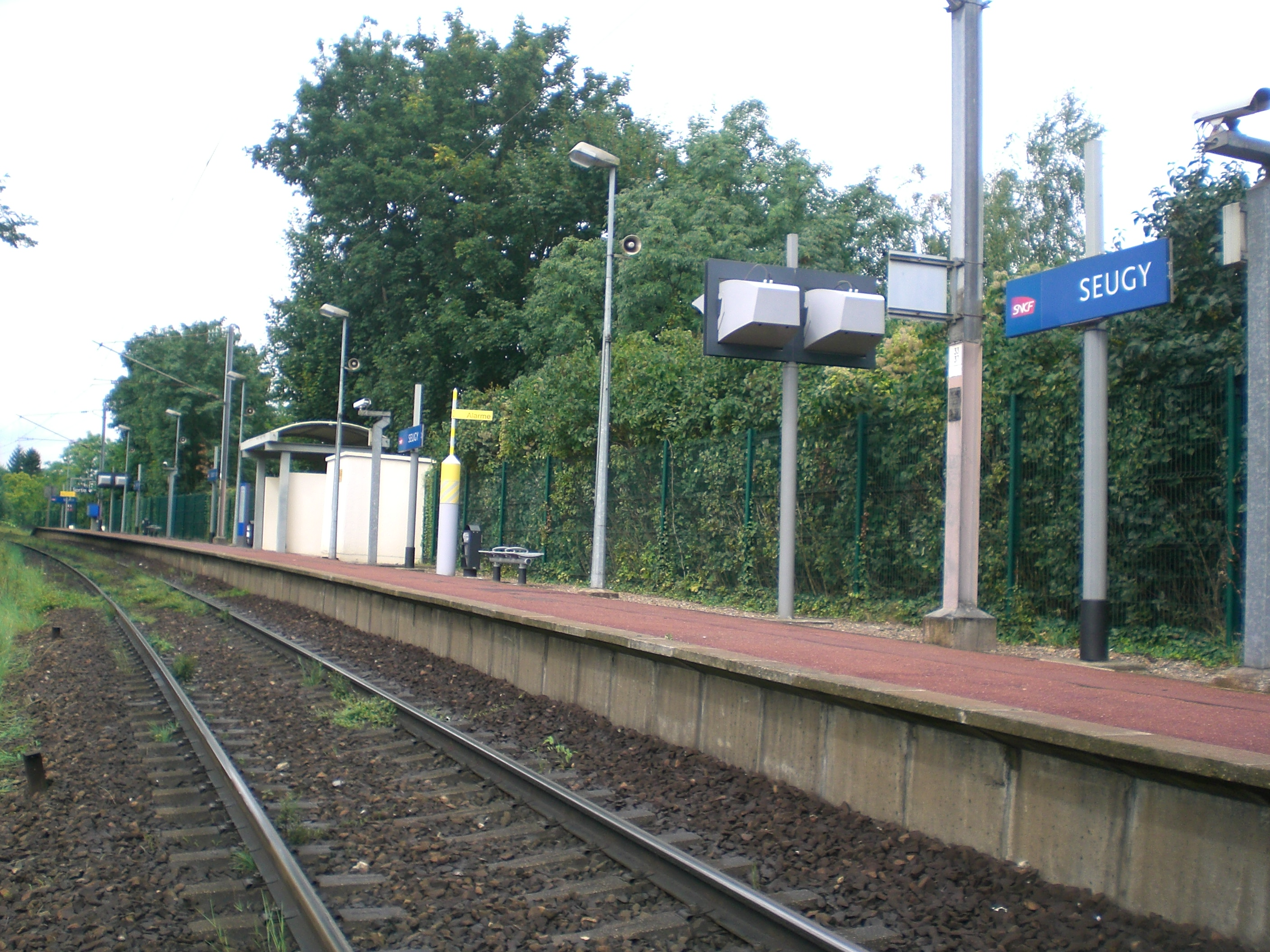

General information
- Location: Seugy, France
- Coordinates: 49°7′8″N 2°23′56″E
- Owner: SNCF
- Line: Montsoult-Maffliers–Luzarches railway
- Platforms: 1

Other information
- Station code: 87272039
- Fare zone: 5

History
- Opened: 1893

Services
Preceding station	Transilien	Following station
Viarmes towards Paris-Nord	Line H	Luzarches Terminus
Location

Seugy is a railway station in Seugy, Val d'Oise department, France. The station is served by the Transilien H trains from Paris to Luzarches. In 2002 fewer than 500 passengers per day joined a train here.
