= Moisselles =

- Commune
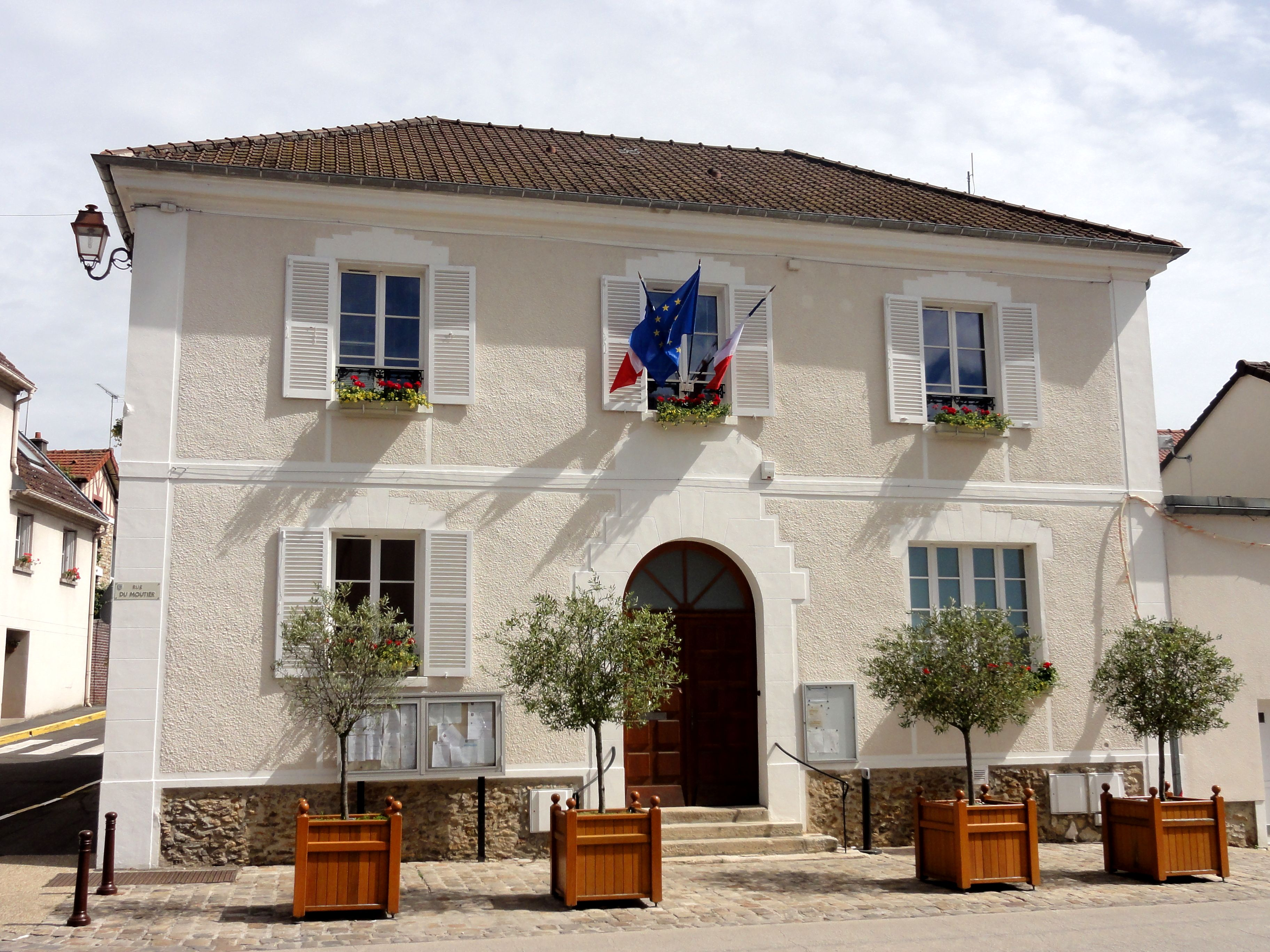
- The town hall of Moisselles

- Coat of arms
- Location of Moisselles
- Location within France Location within Île-de-France (region)
- Coordinates: 49°03′02″N 2°20′12″E
- Country: France
- Region: Île-de-France
- Department: Val-d'Oise
- Arrondissement: Sarcelles
- Canton: Domont
- Intercommunality: CA Plaine Vallée

Government
  - Mayor (2020–2026): Véronique Ribout
- Area^{1}: 1.46 km^{2} (0.56 sq mi)
- Population (2023): 1,261
  - Density: 864/km^{2} (2,240/sq mi)
- Time zone: UTC+01:00 (CET)
  - Summer (DST): UTC+02:00 (CEST)
- INSEE/Postal code: 95409 /95570
- ^{1} French Land Register data, which excludes lakes, ponds, glaciers > 1 km^{2} (0.386 sq mi or 247 acres) and river estuaries.

Moisselles (French pronunciation: [mwasɛl]) is a commune in the Val-d'Oise department in Île-de-France in northern France. It lies 13 km north of St Denis, and about 30 km west of Paris Charles de Gaulle Airport.

== See also ==
- Communes of the Val-d'Oise department
