= Épinay-Villetaneuse–Le Tréport-Mers railway =

Railway line in France

Coordinates: 49.4973°N 1.9892°E

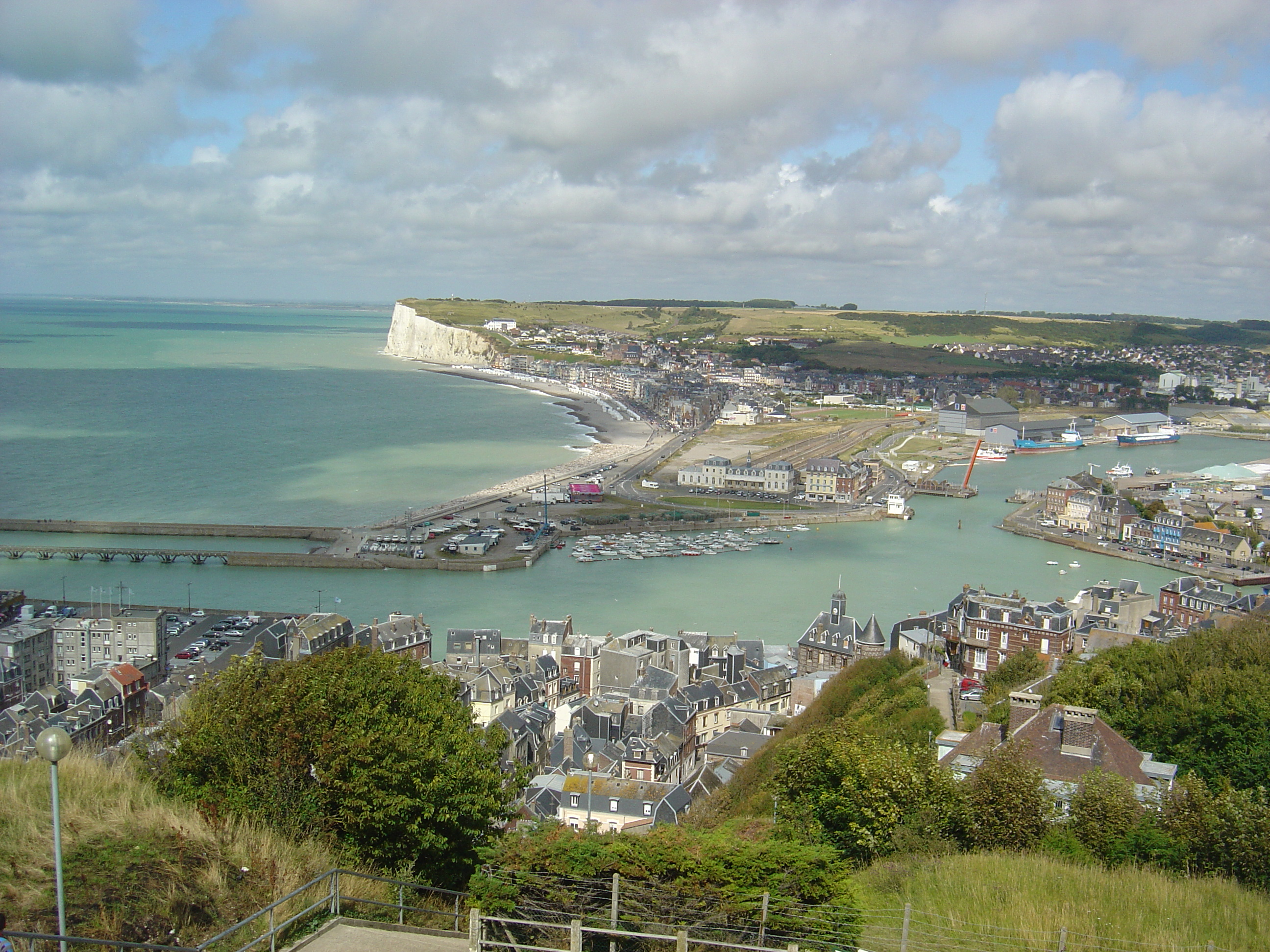
- Épinay-Villetaneuse–Le Tréport-Mers railway

Overview
- Status: Operational
- Owner: SNCF Réseau
- Locale: France (Île-de-France, Hauts-de-France, Normandy)
- Termini: Épinay-Villetaneuse station; Le Tréport-Mers station

Service
- System: SNCF
- Operator(s): SNCF

History
- Opened: 1872-1877

Technical
- Line length: 173 km (107 mi)
- Number of tracks: Double track (Épinay–Milly-sur-Thérain); Single track (Milly-sur-Thérain–Le Tréport)
- Track gauge: 1,435 mm (4 ft 8 1/2 in) standard gauge
- Electrification: 25 kV 50 Hz (Épinay–Beauvais)

The railway from Épinay-Villetaneuse to Le Tréport-Mers is a French 173-kilometre long railway line, that connects Paris to Le Tréport on the English Channel coast. It was opened in several stages between 1872 and 1877.

== Route ==
The Épinay-Villetaneuse–Le Tréport-Mers railway begins near the Épinay-Villetaneuse station, where it branches off the railway from Paris to Pontoise. It winds in generally northern direction to the Montsoult-Maffliers station, where the line to Luzarches branches off. It crosses the river Oise in Persan, and continues in northwestern direction towards Beauvais. It passes through Abancourt. From Aumale it follows the river Bresle downstream until it reaches its terminus Le Tréport-Mers station, near the beach resort towns Le Tréport and Mers-les-Bains.

=== Main stations ===
The main stations on the Épinay-Villetaneuse–Le Tréport-Mers railway are:

- Épinay-Villetaneuse station
- Persan-Beaumont station
- Beauvais station
- Abancourt station
- Le Tréport-Mers station

== Services ==
The Épinay-Villetaneuse–Le Tréport-Mers railway is used by the following passenger services:

- Transilien regional services from Paris to Persan-Beaumont and to Luzarches
- TER Hauts-de-France regional services on the whole line
