= Persan–Beaumont station =

French railway station

Persan–Beaumont
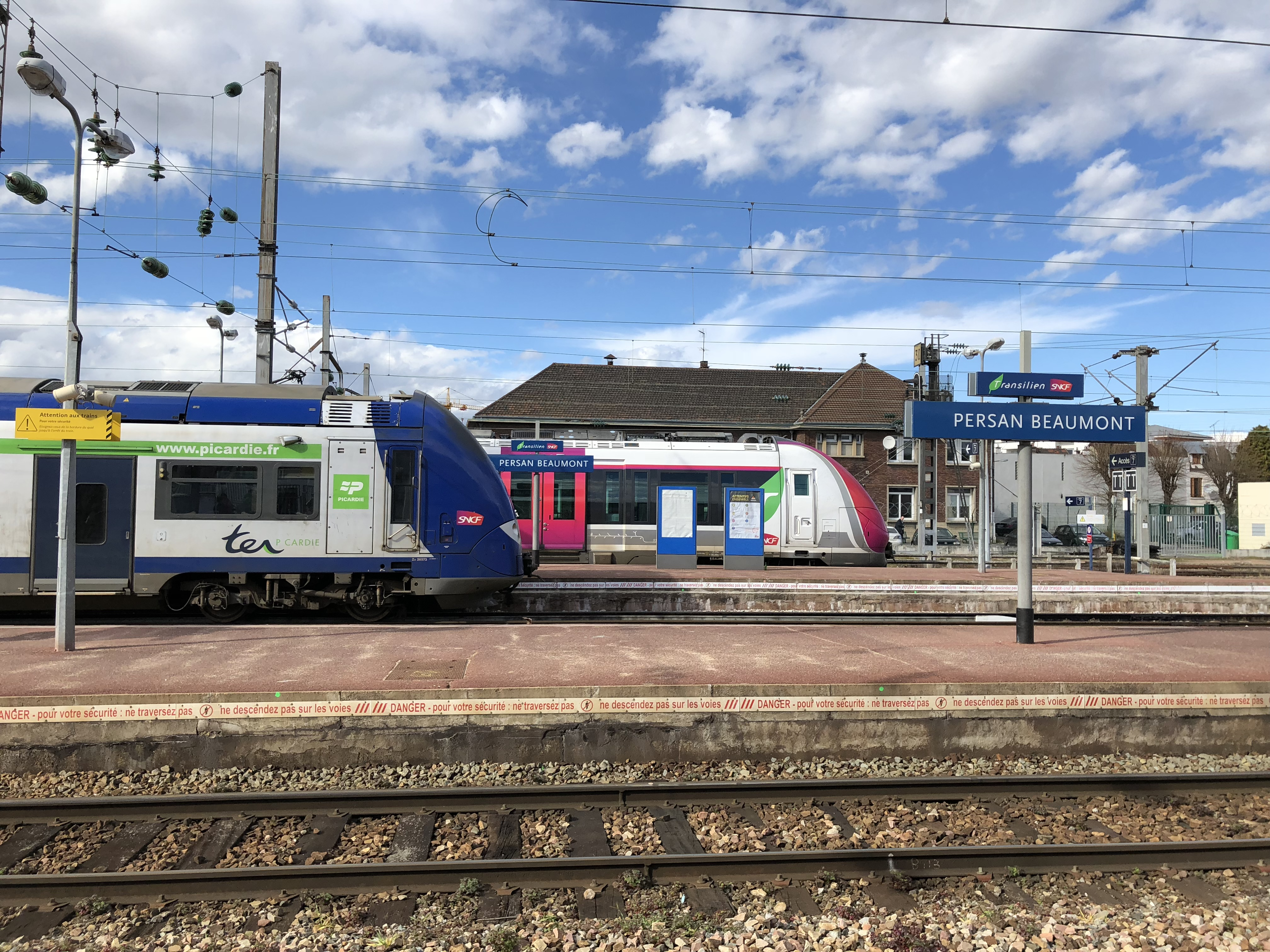

General information
- Location: Place de la Gare; 95340 Persan, France
- Coordinates: 49°8′53″N 2°16′46″E
- Owner: SNCF
- Lines: Épinay-Villetaneuse–Le Tréport-Mers railway Pierrelaye–Creil railway
- Platforms: 4 island, 1 outside
- Tracks: 9, plus several sidings

Other information
- Station code: 87276469
- Fare zone: 5

History
- Opened: 20 June 1846

Passengers
- 2024: 4,212,409
Location

The Persan–Beaumont station is a railway station in Persan (Val-d'Oise department), France, near Beaumont-sur-Oise. It is at the junction of the Épinay-Villetaneuse–Le Tréport-Mers railway and the Pierrelaye–Creil railway. The station is served by trains of the Transilien line H and the TER Hauts-de-France (Paris-Nord – Beauvais).

In 2024, the station's estimated annual passengers is 4,212,409.

== History ==
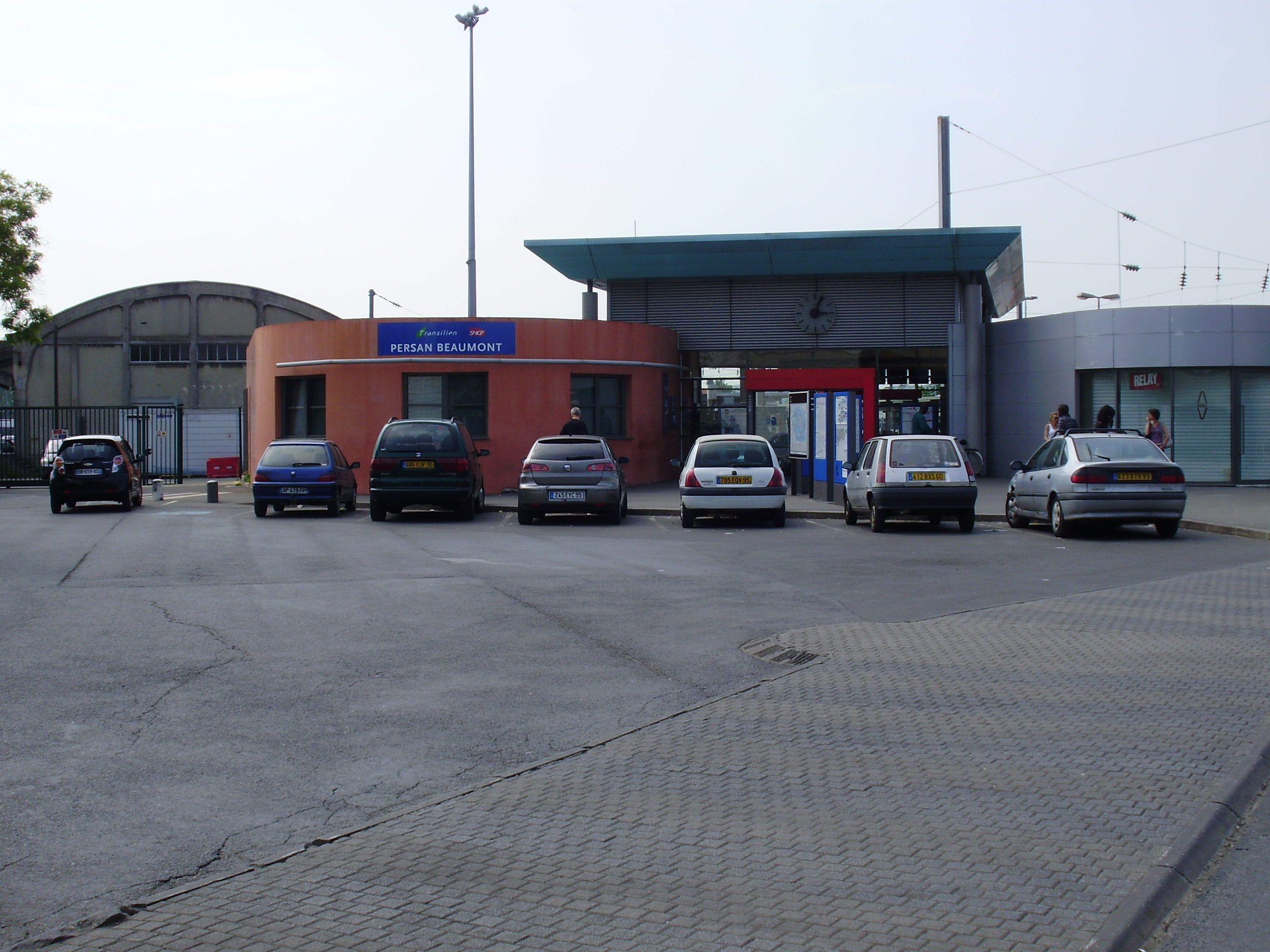
Entrance

Persan-Beaumont is located on the original Paris–Lille railway line, that was opened on 20 June 1846 by Compagnie des chemins de fer du Nord (Nord Railway Company). This line passed along the Montmorency Valley (Ermont-Eaubonne), and headed towards the Northeast at Saint-Ouen-l'Aumône, continuing through the Oise valley. In 1859, a more direct line along Chantilly was opened, bypassing Persan-Beaumont.

The Chemin de fer du Nord opened the line between Épinay and Persan-Beaumont via Montsoult on 5 April 1877, thus creating a direct link between Paris and Beauvais, and further to Le Tréport.

The present station is the third built on the site. The first, which dated to the opening of the line, was destroyed by bombing in August 1944. It was replaced in 1955 by a building that proved inadequate, which was in turn replaced by the present station when the Paris – Beauvais line was electrified.

=== The original station ===
Located at the junction of several important lines:

- Paris-Nord via Montsoult-Maffliers
- Paris-Nord via Valmondois
- Pontoise via Valmondois
- Beauvais
- Creil

The station was equipped with a roundhouse from 1917 on. 35 locomotives were maintained there, including 29 for suburban service and 4 for shunting. There were numerous employees both attached to the maintenance facility and staffing trains.

The maintenance facility worked in tandem with the Joncherolles depot at Villetaneuse to maintain the steam locomotives on the suburban network serving Paris-Nord. In the final years of steam service, a pool of 141 TC locomotives were used, with two locomotives specifically assigned one each to Joncherolles and the other to Beaumont. In 1968, the pool locomotives of the two depots pulled 264 daily trains for a monthly service distance of between 240,000 and 265,000 km. In 1967, they covered 2,838,000 km.

The steam maintenance facilities have been demolished and replaced by a carpark. Persan-Beaumont remains a satellite centre of the Paris-Nord Technicentre.

=== Hermes–Beaumont railway ===
The metre gauge line of the Compagnie du chemin de fer de Hermes à Beaumont (Hermes – Beaumont Railway Company) formerly linked Persan-Beaumont to Hermes, Oise via Noailles. Last operated as a local interest line, it was partly closed in 1949, and the last section, from Persan to Ercuis, closed in 1958.

== See also ==
- List of SNCF stations

Preceding station	TER Hauts-de-France	Following station
Paris-Nord Terminus	Citi C17	Chambly towards Beauvais
Preceding station	Transilien	Following station
Champagne-sur-Oise towards Paris-Nord	Line H	Terminus
Nointel - Mours towards Paris-Nord	Line H	Terminus
Champagne-sur-Oise towards Pontoise	Line H	Bruyères-sur-Oise towards Creil
