= Luzarches station =

Railway station in Luzarches, France

Luzarches
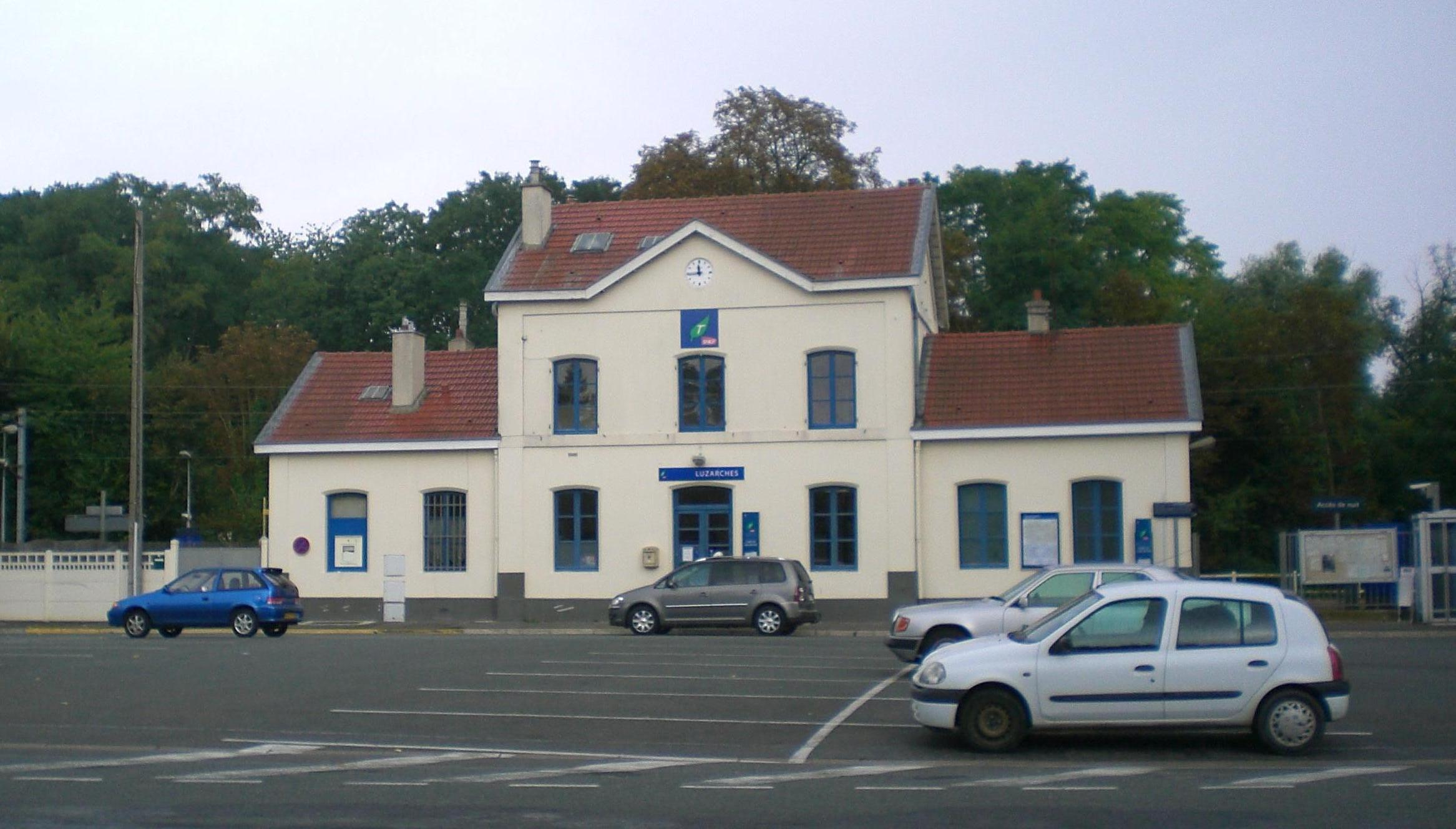

General information
- Location: Luzarches; France
- Coordinates: 49°7′2″N 2°25′14″E
- Owner: SNCF
- Line: Montsoult-Maffliers–Luzarches railway
- Platforms: 2 side platforms
- Tracks: 2

Construction
- Structure type: At-grade
- Accessible: Yes

Other information
- Station code: 87276576
- Fare zone: 5

History
- Opened: 1 May 1880

Services
Preceding station	Transilien	Following station
Seugy towards Paris-Nord	Line H	Terminus
Location

Luzarches station (French: Gare de Luzarches) is a railway station in the commune of Luzarches (Val-d'Oise department), France. The station is served by the Transilien H trains from Paris to Luzarches. The daily number of passengers was less than 500 in 2002. The station has a free parking lot with 83 places.

The first commercial run of the Z 50000 train (nicknamed Francilien) started from this station on Sunday 12 December 2009.

== Bus connections ==
- Haut Val-d'Oise : Haut Val-d'Oise: 1312 1346 1347 1349 1350 1352
- Val Parisis: R117

== Gallery ==
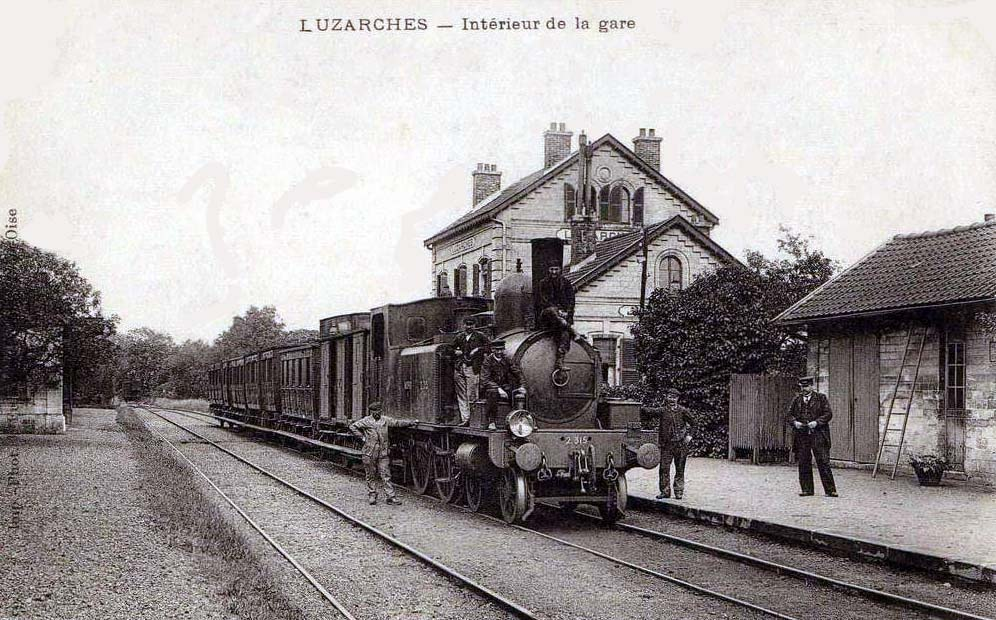
The train station in about 1900

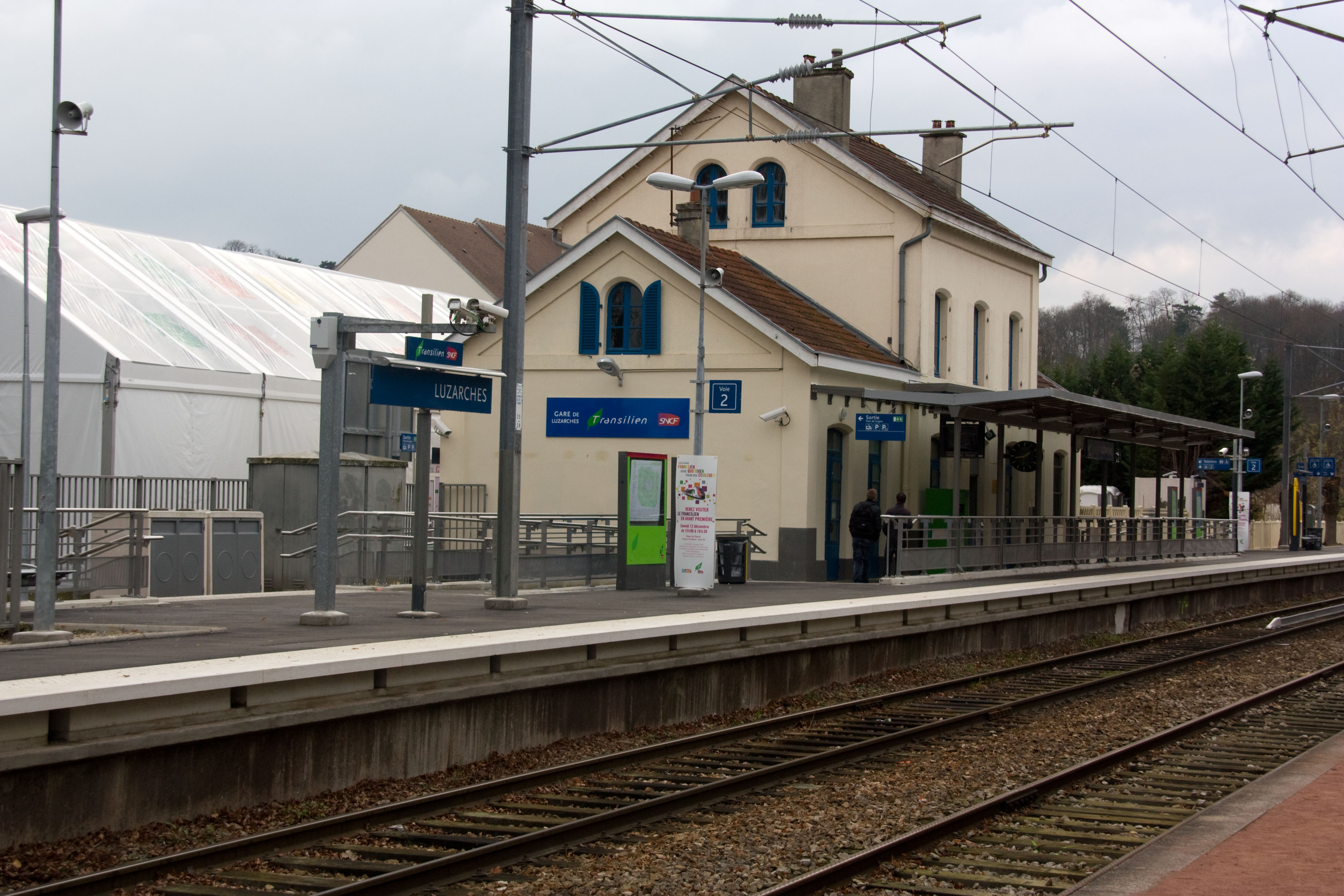
Its platforms

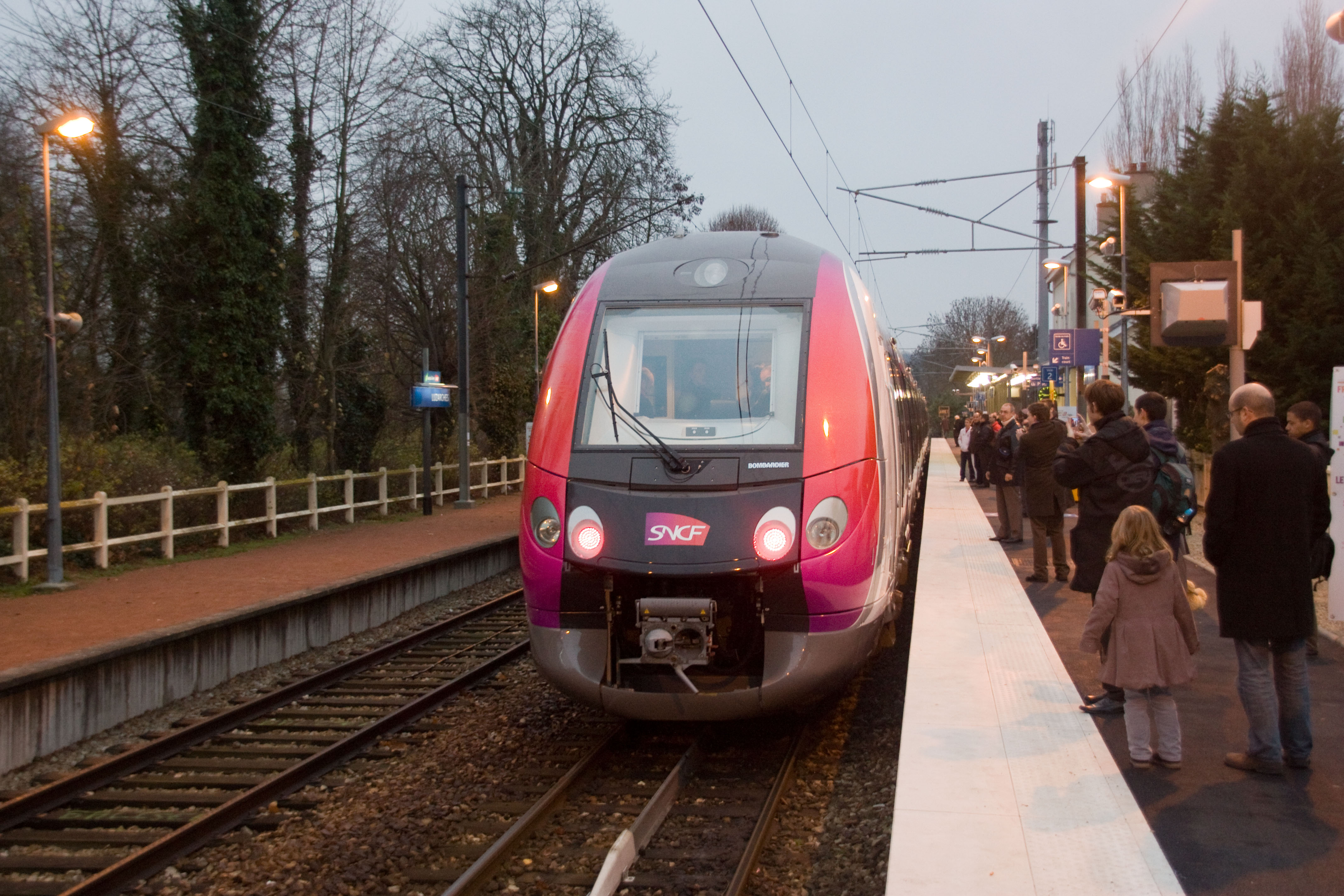
The first service of the
Z 50000, of the Francilien

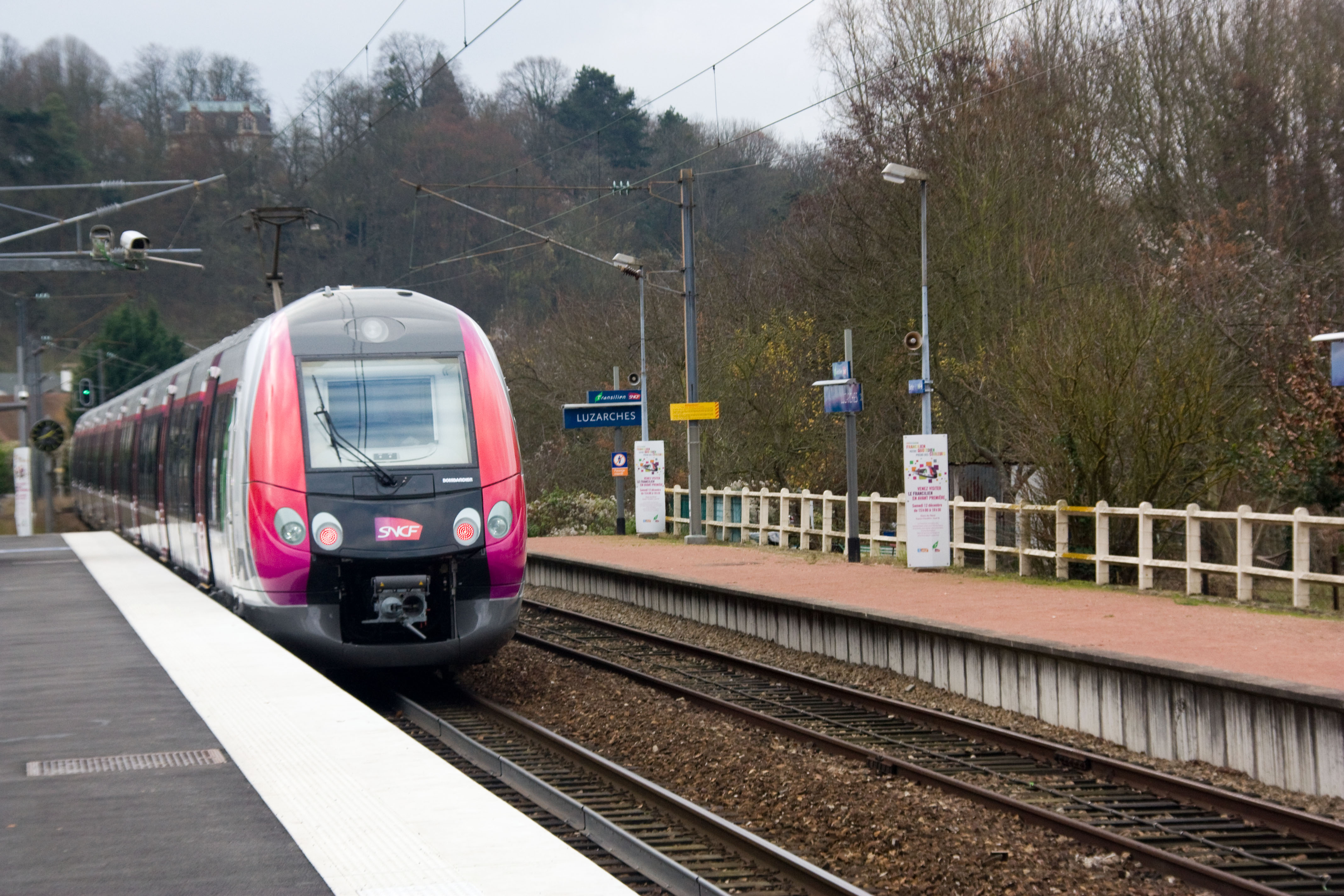
The first service of the
Z 50000, of the Francilien

== See also ==
- List of SNCF stations in Île-de-France
