= Haut Val-d'Oise bus network =

French bus network

Haut Val-d'Oise
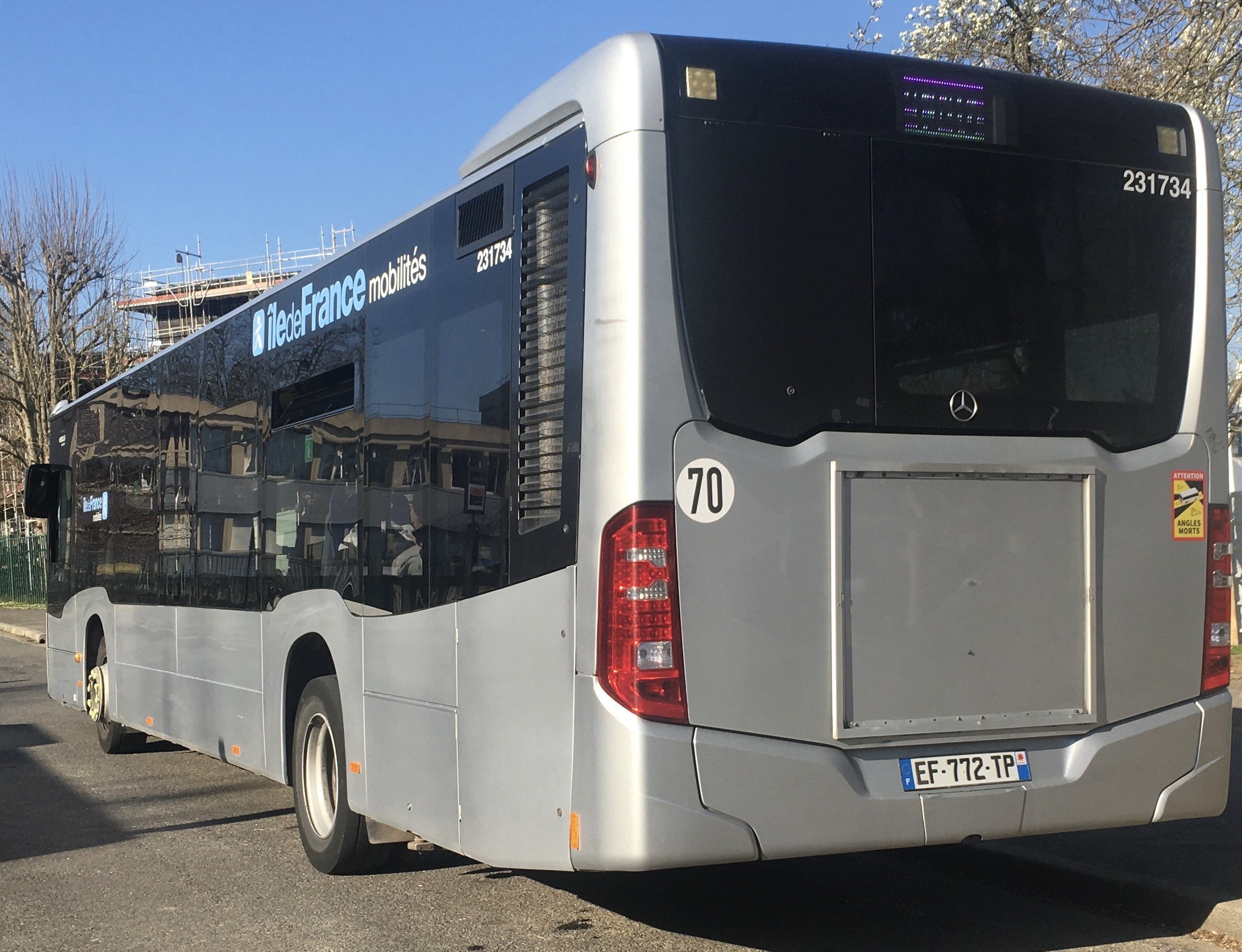
- Mercedes-Benz Citaro C2 n°231734 on line 1346 at Collège Anna de Nouailles / Lycée Gérard de Nerval, in Luzarches
- Parent: Île-de-France Mobilités
- Founded: January 1, 2024
- Service area: Île-de-France: Val-d'Oise: (Asnières-sur-Oise, Baillet-en-France, Beaumont-sur-Oise, Bellefontaine, Belloy-en-France, Bernes-sur-Oise, Bessancourt, Béthemont-la-Forêt, Bruyères-sur-Oise, Cergy, Champagne-sur-Oise, Châtenay-en-France, Chaumontel, Chauvry, Domont, Épinay-Champlâtreux, Fontenay-en-Parisis, Frépillon, Goussainville, Jagny-sous-Bois, Lassy, Le Plessis-Luzarches, Luzarches, Maffliers, Mareil-en-France, Mériel, Méry-sur-Oise, Le Mesnil-Aubry, Montsoult, Mours, Nerville-la-Forêt, Nointel, Noisy-sur-Oise, Parmain, Persan, Le Plessis-Gassot, Presles, Saint-Martin-du-Tertre, Saint-Ouen-l'Aumône, Seugy, Taverny, Viarmes, Villaines-sous-Bois, Villiers-Adam, Villiers-le-Sec); Hauts-de-France: Oise: (Morangles, Mortefontaine)
- Routes: 1301 1302 1303 1304 1305; 1309 1312 1314 1316 1317; 1346 1347 1348 1349 1350; 1351 1352 1353 1354 1356; 100P 9518
- Operator: Keolis (Keolis Nord Val d'Oise)
- Website: Haut Val-d'Oise website

Haut Val-d'Oise is a French bus network run by Île-de-France Mobilités, operated by Keolis through his subsidiary Keolis Nord Val-d'Oise from January 1, 2024.

It consists of 22 lines which mainly serve the communauté de communes du Haut Val-d'Oise, Vallée de l'Oise et des Trois Forêts and Carnelle Pays de France. The network is also completed with two night lines and a demand-responsive transport.

== History ==
=== Network development ===
==== Opening to competition ====
Due to the opening up of public transport to competition in Île-de-France, the Haut Val-d'Oise bus network will be created on January 1, 2024, corresponding to public service delegation number 3 established by Île-de-France Mobilités. An invitation to tender was therefore launched by the organizing authority in order to designate a company which will operate the network for a period of seven years. It is finally the group Keolis via his society Keolis Nord Val d'Oise, designed by the board of directors on December 7, 2022.

At the date of its opening to competition, the network consisted of lines 30.04, 30.25, 30.29 and 30.36 of Cars Lacroix, lines 12, 12.1, 14, 14.1, 38, 46, 47, 49, 50 and R48 (later renamed 48 for the latter) operated by Keolis CIF, the Express 100 Roissy-Persan operated by Keolis Mobilité Roissy, lines 2, A, B, C, E, F, G and DIM of Keolis Val-d'Oise and lines 95.09, 95.10, 95.17 and Express 95.18 of the Busval d'Oise bus network. The contract also includes the new line N147 of the night network Noctilien.

==== Network renaming ====
As of April 8, 2024, the Haut Val-d'Oise network will apply the new principle of single regional numbering planned by Île-de-France Mobilités, removing duplicates and letters. The correspondence between old and new numbers is as follows, while several mergers take place:

Network renaming
Old	New
A	1301
B E G	1302
C	1303
2	1304
DIM	1305
95-09	1309
12	1312
14	1314
30.36	1316
95-17	1317
46	1346
47	1347
48	1348
38; 49	1349
50	1350
30.25; 30.29	1351
12.1	1352
30.04	1353
14.1	1354
F	1356
95-18; Express 100	Unchanged
95-10	Ceased to exist

== Routes ==
=== Main routes ===
Image	Line	First direction	Second direction
	1301	Bruyères-sur-Oise — Rue de Boran	Persan — ZAE Chemin Vert
	1302	Persan — Parc Haut Val-d'Oise 3	Mours — Grands Champs
	1303	Gare de Persan-Beaumont	Gare de L'Isle-Adam - Parmain
	1304	Gare de Persan-Beaumont	Gare de Montsoult - Maffiers; Montsoult — Collège Marcel Pagnol
	1305	Bruyères-sur-Oise — Rue de Boran	Beaumont-sur-Oise — Mairie
	1309	Gare de Montsoult - Maffiers	Baillet-en-France — Carrefour Bouffémont
	1312	Gare de Goussainville	Chaumotel — Rue du Pont
	1314	Gare de Viarmes	Asnières-sur-Oise — Baillon
	1316	Gare de Montsoult - Maffiers; Montsoult — Collège Marcel Pagnol	L'Isle-Adam — Les Chasseurs; L'Isle-Adam — Centre Commercial Le Grand Val
	1317	Gare de Cergy-Préfecture	Mairie de Méry-sur-Oise
	1346	Luzarches — Collège Anna de Nouailles / Lycée Gérard de Nerval	Le Plessis-Gassot — Blancs Manteaux
	1347	Luzarches — Collège Anna de Nouailles / Lycée Gérard de Nerval	Mairie de Saint-Martin-du-Tertre
	1348	Fosses — Lycée Charles Baudelaire	Fontenay-en-Parisis — Centre
	1349	Luzarches — Collège Anna de Nouailles / Lycée Gérard de Nerval	Noisy-sur-Oise — Place Gambetta; Viarmes — L'Etang
	1350	Mortefontaine (Oise, Hauts-de-France) — Institut Saint-Dominique	Viarmes — Route de Royaumont
	1351	Saint-Ouen-L'Aumône — Lycée Edmond Rostand; Mériel — Collège Cecile Sorel	Méry-sur-Oise — Liberation; Méry-sur-Oise — Rue du Bac
	1352	Luzarches — Collège Anna de Nouailles / Lycée Gérard de Nerval	Chaumontel — Rue du Pont
	1353	Taverny — Collège / Lycée Voie des Sports	Mairie de Chauvry
	1354	Viarmes — Collège Blaise Pascal	Asnières-sur-Oise — Baillon
	1356	Gare de Persan-Beaumont	Morangles (Oise, Hauts-de-France) — AFPA
	100P	Gare de Persan-Beaumont	Roissypôle
	9518	Gare de Cergy–Préfecture	Roissypôle

=== Night routes ===
The network is also completed by two night lines named Soirée Haut Val-d'Oise and Soirée Persan-Beaumont.

Image	Line
	Soirée Haut Val-d'Oise
	Soirée Persan-Beaumont

=== Demand-responsive transport ===
The network also operates a demand-responsive transport named TàD Luzarches-Goussainville.

Image	Line
	TàD Luzarches-Goussainville

== See also ==
- Île-de-France Mobilités
