= Belloy–Saint-Martin station =

Railway station in Belloy-en-France, France

Belloy Saint-Martin
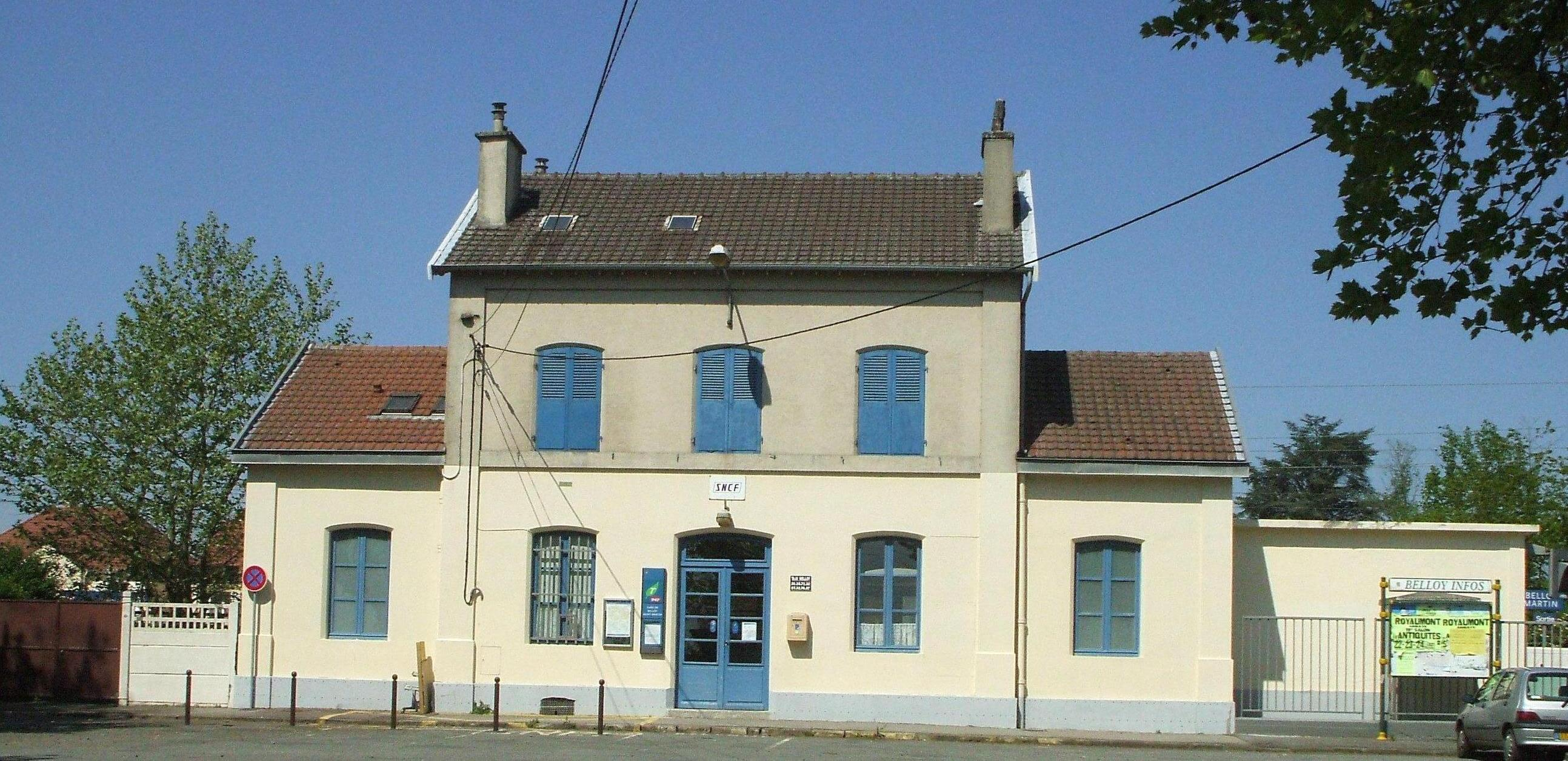

General information
- Location: Belloy-en-France, France
- Coordinates: 49°5′52″N 2°21′39″E
- Owner: SNCF
- Line: Montsoult-Maffliers–Luzarches railway
- Platforms: 2

Construction
- Parking: 123 places

Other information
- Station code: 87276550
- Fare zone: 5

History
- Opened: 1 May 1880

Services
Preceding station	Transilien	Following station
Villaines towards Paris-Nord	Line H	Viarmes towards Luzarches
Location

Belloy–Saint-Martin is a railway station in Belloy-en-France (Val d'Oise department), France. It is on the Luzarches line 26.8 km from Gare de Paris-Nord. The railway station lies between the communes of Belloy-en-France and Saint-Martin-du-Tertre, near the hamlet of Les Briqueteries. It is served by Transilien line H trains from Paris to Luzarches. On a single track line the station has two tracks and platforms forming a passing loop.

In 2002 fewer than 500 passengers per day joined a train here.

== Bus connections ==
- Haut Val-d'Oise : Haut Val-d'Oise: 1304 1347
