= Enghien Moisselles Airfield =

Enghien Moisselles Airfield Aérodrome d'Enghien Moisselles
- IATA: none; ICAO: LFFE

Summary
- Airport type: Restricted
- Operator: Aéroclub "Les Ailerons"
- Serves: Enghien-les-Bains and Moisselles
- Location: Moisselles, Attainville and Ézanville
- Coordinates: 49°02′44″N 02°21′07″E

Map
- Location of airport in France

Runways
Direction	Length		Surface
Direction	ft	m	Surface
07/25	2,428	740	Asphalt

Enghien Moisselles Airfield is located in the communes of Moisselles, Attainville and Ézanville. It is used for the practice of light aviation, ultralight aviation and model aircraft.

== History ==
In 1931, the commune of Enghien-les-Bains, with the flying club "Les Ailerons", created the "André Chalaux" gliding school with four gliders, in the commune of Moisselles. In 1933, with the development of light aviation, the "Ailes Enghiennoises" association acquired 25 hectares in Moisselles and neighboring communes of Attainville, Ezanville to establish the Enghien-Moisselles airfield. The purchase was subsidised by the state which provided 50% of the budget for land and development. The field opened in 1934-1935 and its operation was entrusted to the Aéroclub de Royan. Two hangars were built (one for planes and one for gliders), as well as a garage and a clubhouse.

In 1949, Jean Michel Vernhes became president of the "Les Ailerons" flying club, remaining so until 1971. In 1959, the Enghien-Moisselles airfield acquired the status of "light and sporting aviation airfield". Since the construction of Charles de Gaulle Airport, the airfield has been put into restricted use.

In 2017, runway 16/34 was removed; only 07/25 remains.
