= Fosses =

- Commune
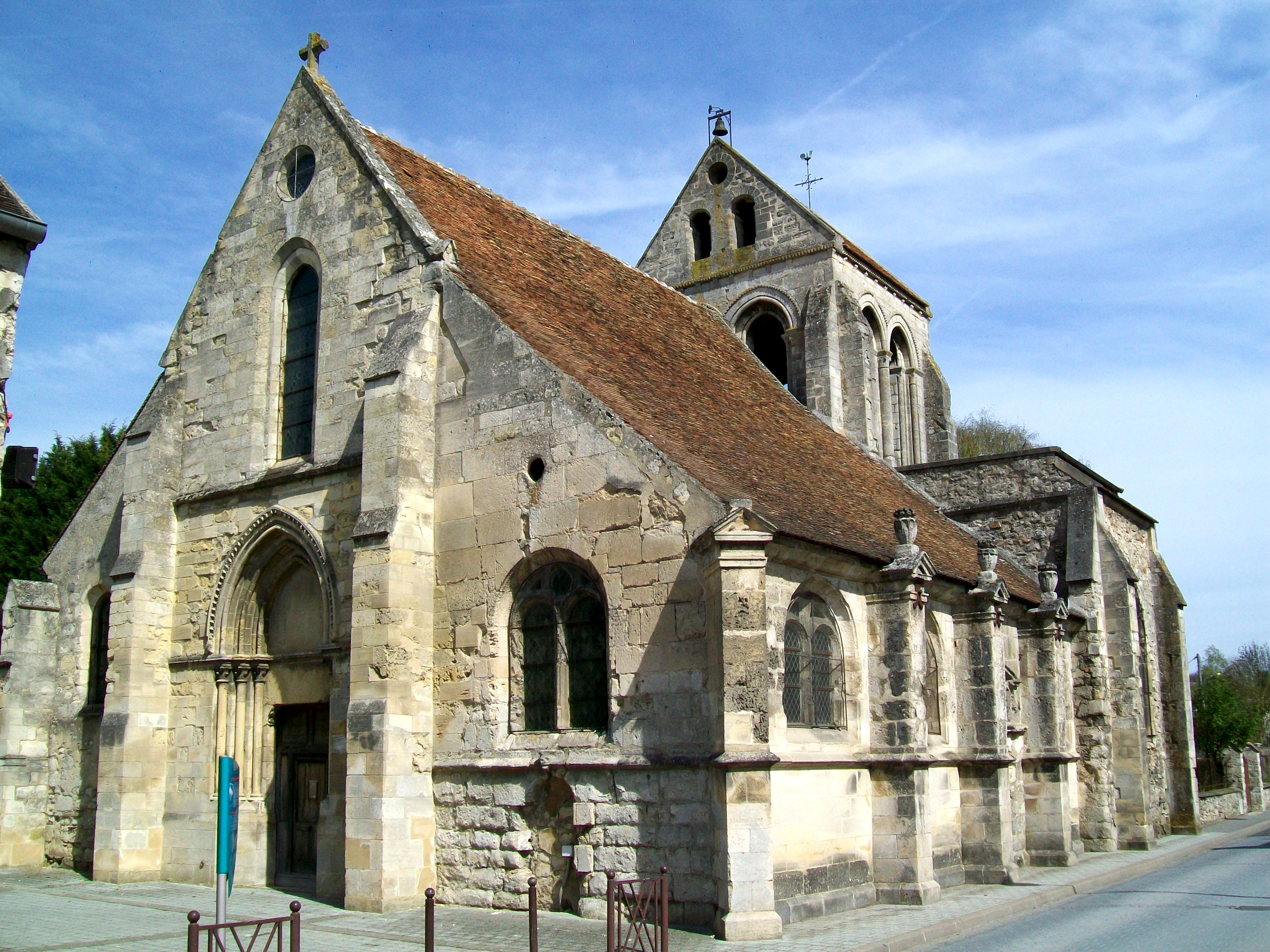
- The church of Saint-Étienne, in Fosses

- Coat of arms
- Location of Fosses
- Location within France Location within Île-de-France (region)
- Coordinates: 49°05′56″N 2°30′27″E
- Country: France
- Region: Île-de-France
- Department: Val-d'Oise
- Arrondissement: Sarcelles
- Canton: Fosses
- Intercommunality: CA Roissy Pays de France

Government
  - Mayor (2023–2026): Jacqueline Haesinger
- Area^{1}: 3.61 km^{2} (1.39 sq mi)
- Population (2023): 10,570
  - Density: 2,930/km^{2} (7,580/sq mi)
- Time zone: UTC+01:00 (CET)
  - Summer (DST): UTC+02:00 (CEST)
- INSEE/Postal code: 95250 /95470
- ^{1} French Land Register data, which excludes lakes, ponds, glaciers > 1 km^{2} (0.386 sq mi or 247 acres) and river estuaries.

Fosses (French pronunciation: [fos]) is a commune in the Val-d'Oise department in Île-de-France in northern France.

== Population ==
Historical population
Year	Pop.	±% p.a.
1968	2,209	—
1975	6,453	+16.55%
1982	8,832	+4.59%
1990	9,620	+1.07%
1999	9,998	+0.43%
2007	9,701	−0.38%
2012	9,582	−0.25%
2017	9,679	+0.20%
2023	10,570	+1.48%
Source: INSEE

== Heraldic ==
D'azur à la champagne cousue de sinople, à la devise ondée d'argent brochant sur la partition, à l'arbre chimérique du même, le fût arraché et sommé de deux mains, l'une dextre et l'autre senestre, soutenant et supportant une ville d'or, brochant sur le tout. Translation:Azure champagne sewn Vert, currency wavy Argent surmounting the partition, the tree of the same chimerical, was snatched and ordered the two hands, one dextral and sinistral the other, supporting and supporting a city of gold stitching on the whole.

== Education ==
Schools in Fosses:

- Preschools (écoles maternelles): Alphonse Daudet, Alexandre Dumas, La Fontaine, and Frédéric Mistral
- Elementary schools: Henri Barbusse, Alphonse Daudet, Alexandre Dumas, and Frédéric Mistral
- Collège Stendhal (junior high schools)
- Lycée Polyvalent Charles Baudelaire (senior high school)

== International relations ==
Fosses is twinned with:

- Serres, Greece
- Bil'in, Palestine
- Kampti, Burkina Faso

== See also ==
- Communes of the Val-d'Oise department
