= Château de Châtenay-en-France =

Château in Île-de-France, France

Coordinates: 49.0678°N 2.4564°E

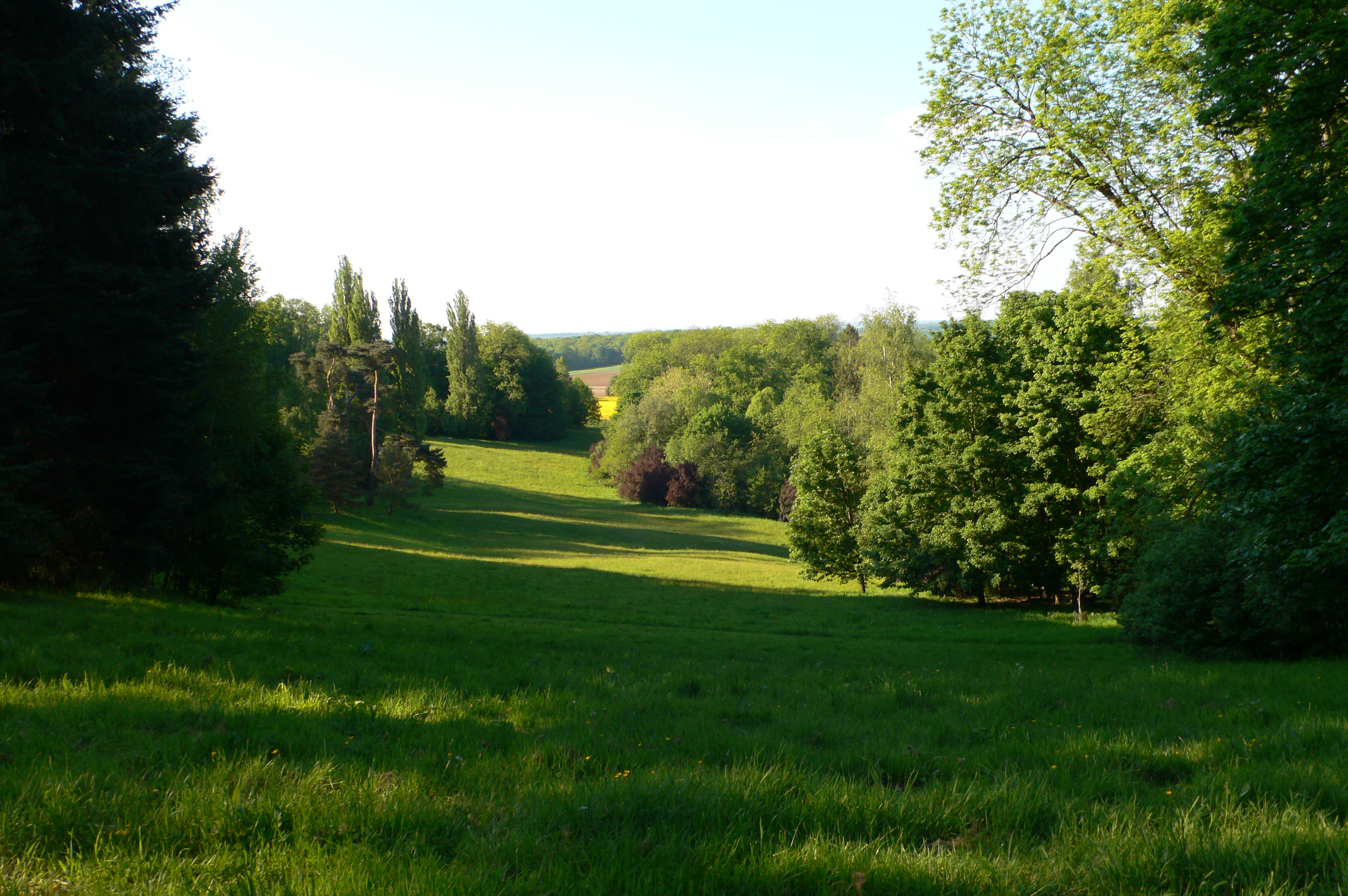
Château de Châtenay, park view from the terrace

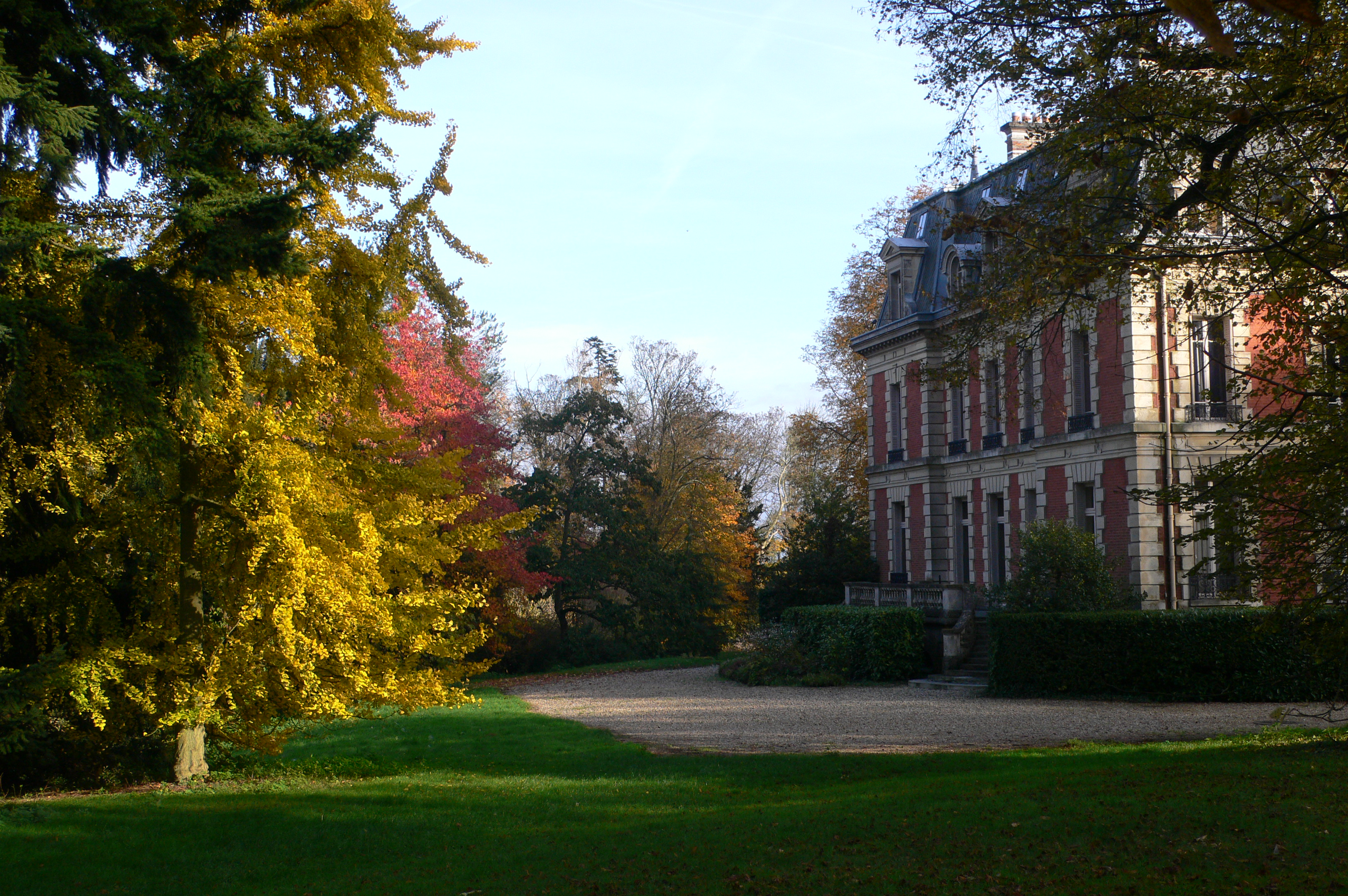
Château de Châtenay, north-west wall

The Château de Châtenay is located in Châtenay-en-France, 24 kilometres (15 mi) north of Paris. The estate stretches over more than 19 hectares (47 acres) of land and shelters a 19th-century castle, an 18th-century farm and the orangerie. Its romantic garden has remained essentially unchanged for more than a century.

== History ==
The history of Châtenay began in 1097, with the donation of the parish church to the Benedictine abbey of Saint-Martin-des-Champs. At that time, a stately mansion and a large farm testified to the agricultural wealth of this area, known as the Pays de France. The mansion and the farm were both sold as national property during the French Revolution to the Herelle family, which was to develop a residential project.

The latter included a neo-classical mansion built in 1878 by architect Dainville and a 19-hectare (47-acre) romantic garden. Work on the park began in 1835 under the leadership of landscape architect Louis-Sulpice Varé, who would later be entrusted by Napoleon III to design the Bois de Boulogne, in Paris. It was completed in 1884 by the Bühler brothers, creators of the Parc de la Tête d'Or, in Lyon. The result is a romantic garden following the “modern” laws depicted by Jean-Jacques Rousseau in La Nouvelle Héloïse, as opposed to the previously fashionable French garden style. The Château, a Louis XIIIth-styled mansion, is home to several social venues, its landmark being the Grand Salon and its large terrace overlooking the surrounding forests of Halatte and Chantilly.

The Renaud family, who acquired the property in 1922, kept it in its original integrity, while continuing their predecessors’ work. In 1987, landscape gardener Gilles Clément designed new parts of the grounds and cleared some others, which had been obstructed by prolific vegetation. Now protected as a National Heritage Site of France area and part of a Regional Natural Park, Châtenay is preserved from wild urbanism, despite its proximity to Paris (24 km or 15 mi) and Charles de Gaulle Airport (16 km or 10 mi).

Therefore, the Château de Châtenay can be considered as a witness of the cultural and social life of French bourgeoisie in the 19th century. Since 1983, it has been dedicated to seminars, professional meetings, launching of products or less formal corporate events.
