= Canton of Fosses =

Coordinates: 49.10°N 2.51°E

The canton of Fosses is an administrative division of the Val-d'Oise department, Île-de-France region, northern France. It was created at the French canton reorganisation which came into effect in March 2015. Its seat is in Fosses.

It consists of the following communes:

1. Attainville
2. Bellefontaine
3. Belloy-en-France
4. Châtenay-en-France
5. Chaumontel
6. Écouen
7. Épinay-Champlâtreux
8. Ézanville
9. Fontenay-en-Parisis
10. Fosses
11. Jagny-sous-Bois
12. Lassy
13. Luzarches
14. Maffliers
15. Mareil-en-France
16. Le Mesnil-Aubry
17. Le Plessis-Gassot
18. Le Plessis-Luzarches
19. Puiseux-en-France
20. Saint-Martin-du-Tertre
21. Seugy
22. Viarmes
23. Villaines-sous-Bois
24. Villiers-le-Sec
