= Arrondissement of Sarcelles =

Coordinates: 48°59′50″N 2°22′43″E

Sarcelles
- Arrondissement
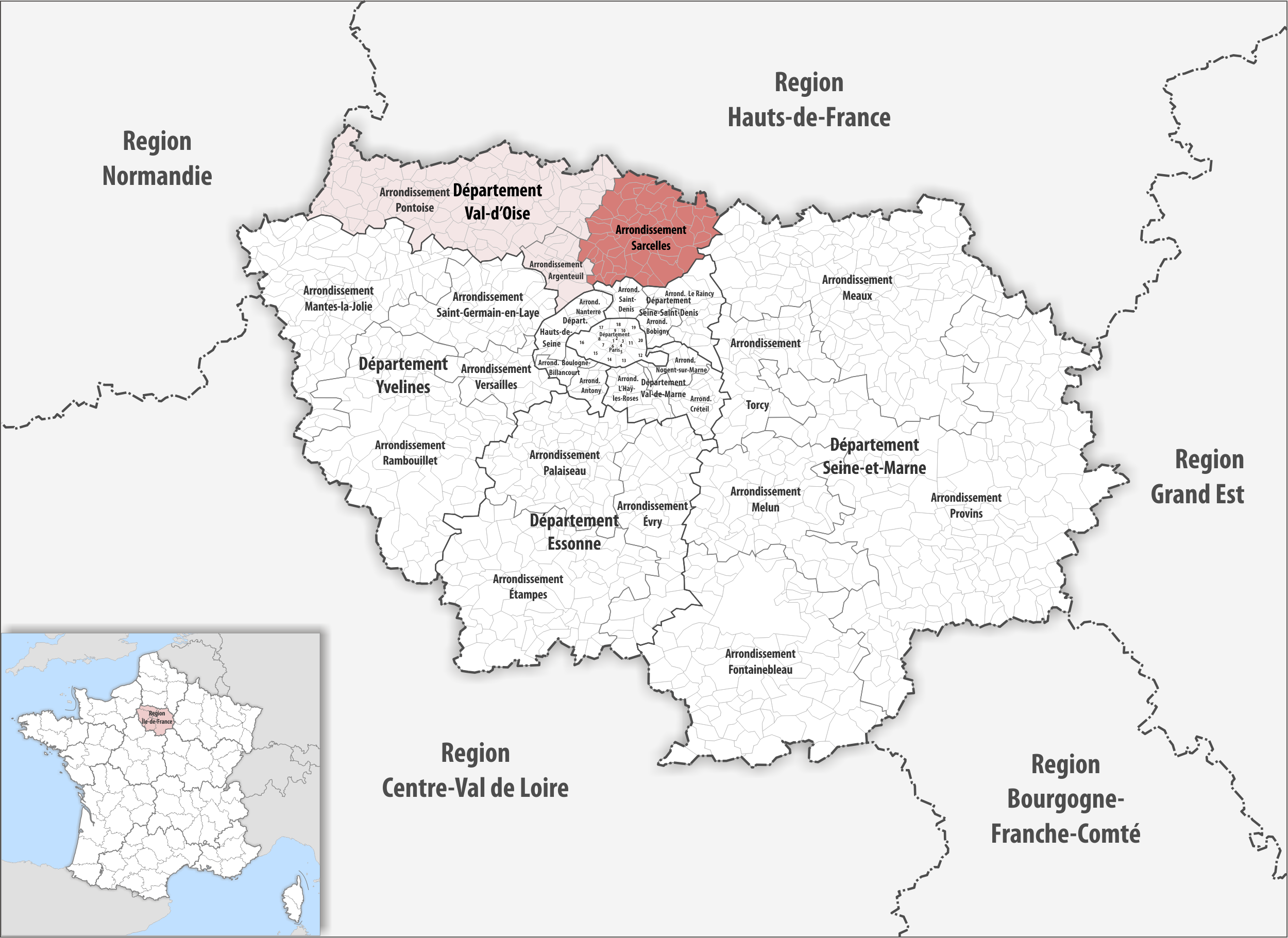
- Location within the region Île-de-France
- Country: France
- Region: Île-de-France
- Department: Val-d'Oise
- No. of communes: {{{nbcomm}}}
- Area: 371.3 km^{2} (143.4 sq mi)
- Population (2023): 490,335
  - Density: 1,321/km^{2} (3,420/sq mi)
- INSEE code: 952

The arrondissement of Sarcelles is an arrondissement of France in the Val-d'Oise department in the Île-de-France region. It has 62 communes. Its population is 481,685 (2021), and its area is 371.3 km^{2} (143.4 sq mi).

== Composition ==
The communes of the arrondissement of Sarcelles, and their INSEE codes, are:

1. Andilly (95014)
2. Arnouville (95019)
3. Asnières-sur-Oise (95026)
4. Attainville (95028)
5. Baillet-en-France (95042)
6. Bellefontaine (95055)
7. Belloy-en-France (95056)
8. Bonneuil-en-France (95088)
9. Bouffémont (95091)
10. Bouqueval (95094)
11. Châtenay-en-France (95144)
12. Chaumontel (95149)
13. Chennevières-lès-Louvres (95154)
14. Deuil-la-Barre (95197)
15. Domont (95199)
16. Écouen (95205)
17. Enghien-les-Bains (95210)
18. Épiais-lès-Louvres (95212)
19. Épinay-Champlâtreux (95214)
20. Ézanville (95229)
21. Fontenay-en-Parisis (95241)
22. Fosses (95250)
23. Garges-lès-Gonesse (95268)
24. Gonesse (95277)
25. Goussainville (95280)
26. Groslay (95288)
27. Jagny-sous-Bois (95316)
28. Lassy (95331)
29. Le Mesnil-Aubry (95395)
30. Le Plessis-Gassot (95492)
31. Le Plessis-Luzarches (95493)
32. Le Thillay (95612)
33. Louvres (95351)
34. Luzarches (95352)
35. Maffliers (95353)
36. Mareil-en-France (95365)
37. Margency (95369)
38. Marly-la-Ville (95371)
39. Moisselles (95409)
40. Montlignon (95426)
41. Montmagny (95427)
42. Montmorency (95428)
43. Montsoult (95430)
44. Piscop (95489)
45. Puiseux-en-France (95509)
46. Roissy-en-France (95527)
47. Saint-Brice-sous-Forêt (95539)
48. Saint-Gratien (95555)
49. Saint-Martin-du-Tertre (95566)
50. Saint-Prix (95574)
51. Saint-Witz (95580)
52. Sarcelles (95585)
53. Seugy (95594)
54. Soisy-sous-Montmorency (95598)
55. Survilliers (95604)
56. Vaudherland (95633)
57. Vémars (95641)
58. Viarmes (95652)
59. Villaines-sous-Bois (95660)
60. Villeron (95675)
61. Villiers-le-Bel (95680)
62. Villiers-le-Sec (95682)

== History ==
The arrondissement of Montmorency was created in 1962 as part of the department Seine-et-Oise. In 1968 it became part of the new department Val-d'Oise. In March 2000 Sarcelles replaced Montmorency as subprefecture. At the January 2017 reorganisation of the arrondissements of Val-d'Oise, it received two communes from the arrondissement of Pontoise, and it lost one commune to the arrondissement of Pontoise.

As a result of the reorganisation of the cantons of France which came into effect in 2015, the borders of the cantons are no longer related to the borders of the arrondissements. The cantons of the arrondissement of Sarcelles were, as of January 2015:

1. Domont
2. Écouen
3. Enghien-les-Bains
4. Garges-lès-Gonesse-Est
5. Garges-lès-Gonesse-Ouest
6. Gonesse
7. Goussainville
8. Luzarches
9. Montmorency
10. Saint-Gratien
11. Sarcelles-Nord-Est
12. Sarcelles-Sud-Ouest
13. Soisy-sous-Montmorency
14. Viarmes
15. Villiers-le-Bel
