= Puiseux-en-France =

- Commune
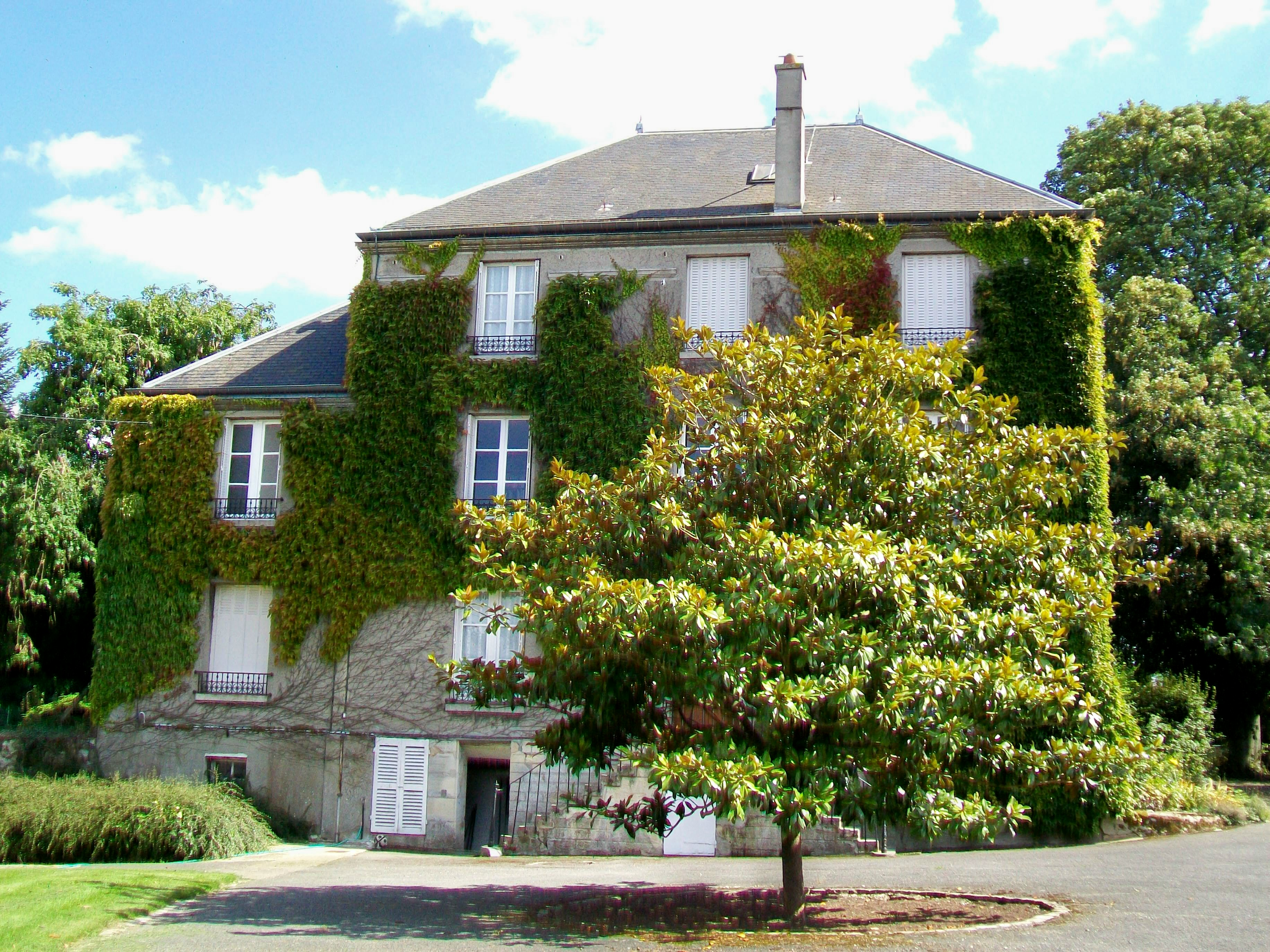
- The church farm dwelling in Puiseux-en-France

- Coat of arms
- Location of Puiseux-en-France
- Location within France Location within Île-de-France (region)
- Coordinates: 49°03′31″N 2°30′03″E
- Country: France
- Region: Île-de-France
- Department: Val-d'Oise
- Arrondissement: Sarcelles
- Canton: Fosses
- Intercommunality: CA Roissy Pays de France

Government
  - Mayor (2026–32): Séjiane René
- Area^{1}: 5.11 km^{2} (1.97 sq mi)
- Population (2023): 3,765
  - Density: 737/km^{2} (1,910/sq mi)
- Demonym: Puiséens
- Time zone: UTC+01:00 (CET)
  - Summer (DST): UTC+02:00 (CEST)
- INSEE/Postal code: 95509 /95380
- Website: www.puiseux-en-france.fr
- ^{1} French Land Register data, which excludes lakes, ponds, glaciers > 1 km^{2} (0.386 sq mi or 247 acres) and river estuaries.

Puiseux-en-France (French pronunciation: [pɥizø ɑ̃ fʁɑ̃s]; lit. 'Puiseux-in-France') is a commune in the Val-d'Oise department in Île-de-France in northern France.

== Population ==
Historical population
Year	Pop.	±% p.a.
1968	1,020	—
1975	2,966	+16.47%
1982	3,098	+0.62%
1990	3,121	+0.09%
1999	2,929	−0.70%
2007	3,444	+2.05%
2012	3,262	−1.08%
2017	3,523	+1.55%
2023	3,765	+1.11%
Source: INSEE

== See also ==
- Communes of the Val-d'Oise department
