= Fontenay-en-Parisis =

- Commune
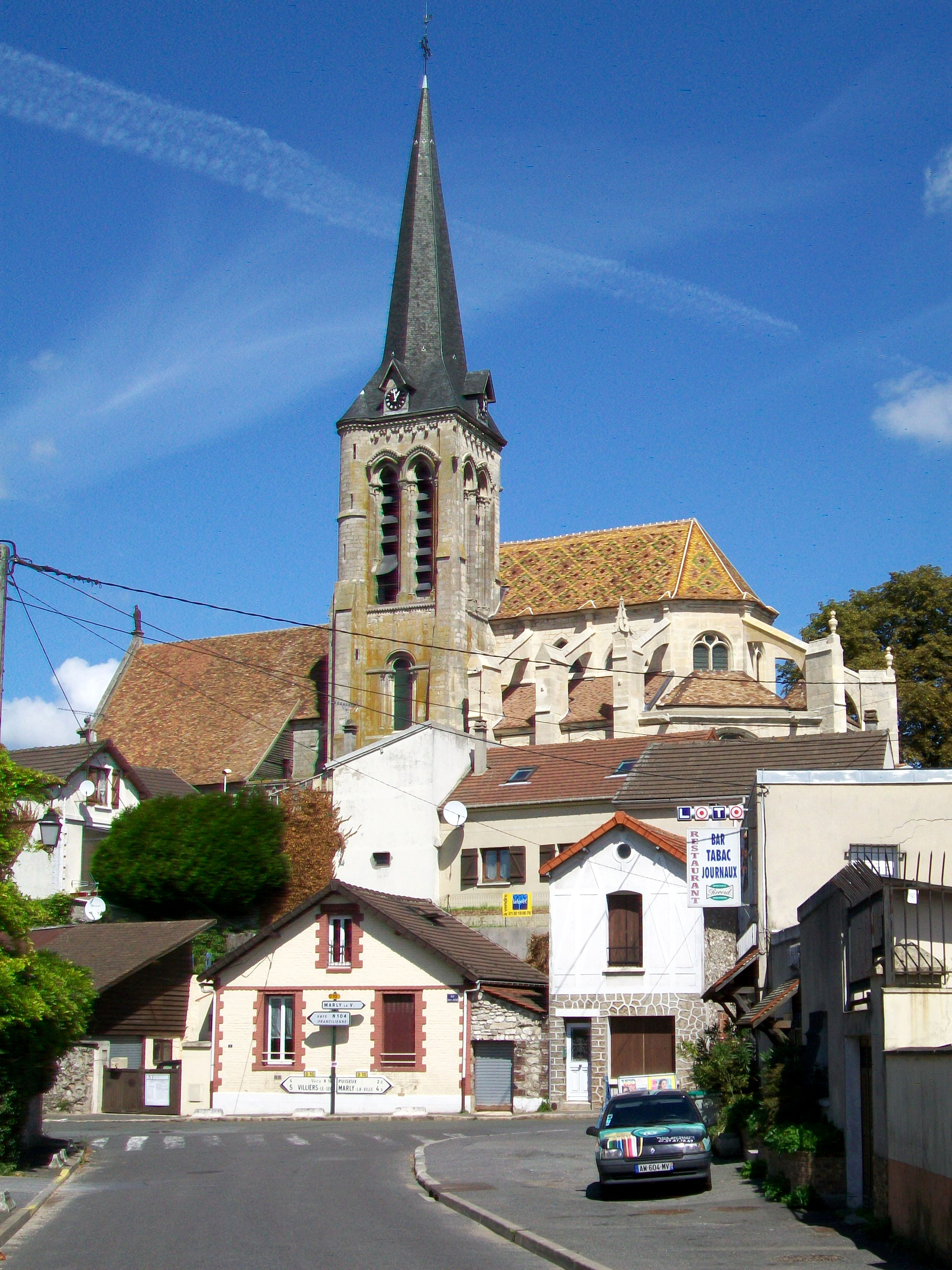
- The church of Saint-Aquilin, in Fontenay-en-Paris

- Coat of arms
- Location of Fontenay-en-Parisis
- Location within France Location within Île-de-France (region)
- Coordinates: 49°03′12″N 2°27′04″E
- Country: France
- Region: Île-de-France
- Department: Val-d'Oise
- Arrondissement: Sarcelles
- Canton: Fosses
- Intercommunality: CA Roissy Pays de France

Government
  - Mayor (2020–2026): Roland Py
- Area^{1}: 10.84 km^{2} (4.19 sq mi)
- Population (2023): 2,219
  - Density: 204.7/km^{2} (530.2/sq mi)
- Time zone: UTC+01:00 (CET)
  - Summer (DST): UTC+02:00 (CEST)
- INSEE/Postal code: 95241 /95190
- ^{1} French Land Register data, which excludes lakes, ponds, glaciers > 1 km^{2} (0.386 sq mi or 247 acres) and river estuaries.

Fontenay-en-Parisis (French pronunciation: [fɔ̃tnɛ ɑ̃ paʁizi], literally Fontenay in Parisis) is a commune in the Val-d'Oise department in Île-de-France in northern France.

== Population ==
Historical population
Year	Pop.	±% p.a.
1968	617	—
1975	937	+6.15%
1982	899	−0.59%
1990	1,716	+8.42%
1999	1,710	−0.04%
2007	1,925	+1.49%
2012	1,899	−0.27%
2017	1,980	+0.84%
2023	2,219	+1.92%
Source: INSEE

== See also ==
- Communes of the Val-d'Oise department
