= Châtenay-en-France =

- Commune
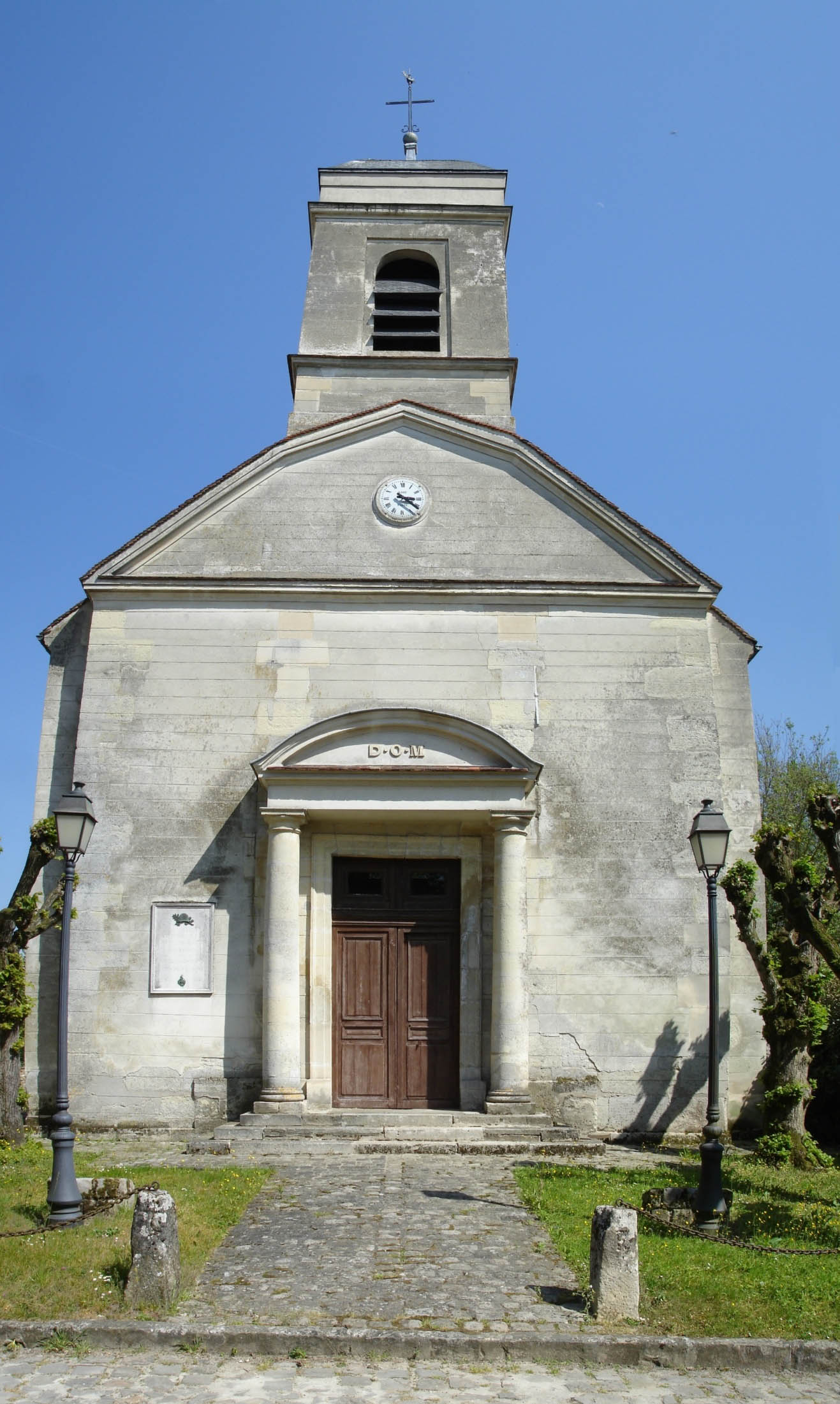
- The church in Châtenay-en-France
- Location of Châtenay-en-France
- Location within France Location within Île-de-France (region)
- Coordinates: 49°04′03″N 2°27′32″E
- Country: France
- Region: Île-de-France
- Department: Val-d'Oise
- Arrondissement: Sarcelles
- Canton: Fosses
- Intercommunality: CC Carnelle Pays de France

Government
  - Mayor (2020–2026): Jacques Renaud
- Area^{1}: 3.07 km^{2} (1.19 sq mi)
- Population (2023): 68
  - Density: 22/km^{2} (57/sq mi)
- Demonym: Francs-Chatenaisiens
- Time zone: UTC+01:00 (CET)
  - Summer (DST): UTC+02:00 (CEST)
- INSEE/Postal code: 95144 /95190
- ^{1} French Land Register data, which excludes lakes, ponds, glaciers > 1 km^{2} (0.386 sq mi or 247 acres) and river estuaries.

Châtenay-en-France (French pronunciation: [ʃatnɛ ɑ̃ fʁɑ̃s]; lit. 'Châtenay-in-France') is a commune in the Val-d'Oise department in Île-de-France in northern France.

== See also ==
- Communes of the Val-d'Oise department
- Château de Châtenay-en-France
