= Le Plessis-Gassot =

- Commune
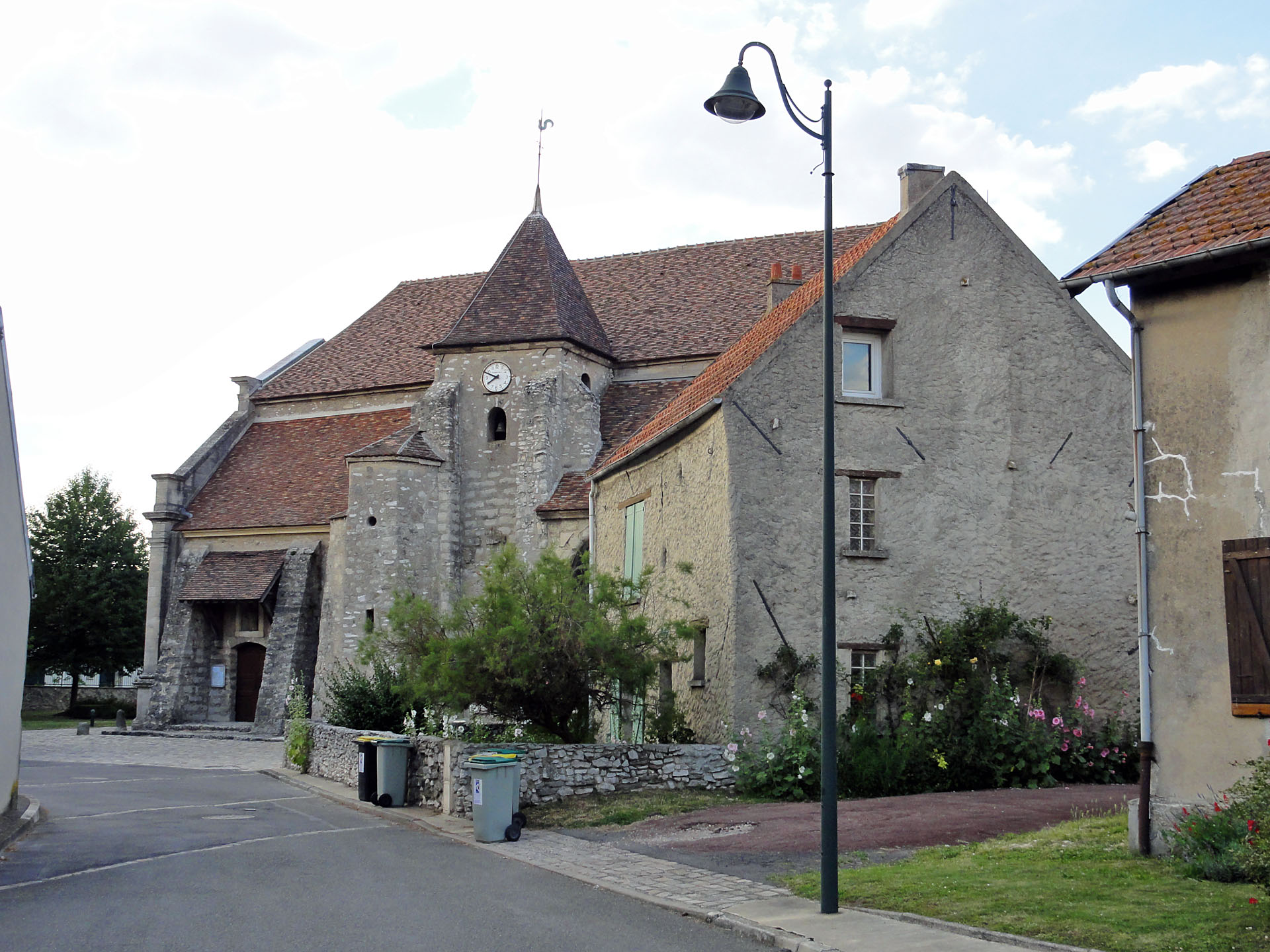
- The church of Our Lady of the Assumption, in Le Plessis-Gassot
- Location of Le Plessis-Gassot
- Location within France Location within Île-de-France (region)
- Coordinates: 49°02′02″N 2°24′58″E
- Country: France
- Region: Île-de-France
- Department: Val-d'Oise
- Arrondissement: Sarcelles
- Canton: Fosses
- Intercommunality: CA Roissy Pays de France

Government
  - Mayor (2020–2026): Didier Guevel
- Area^{1}: 4.10 km^{2} (1.58 sq mi)
- Population (2023): 102
  - Density: 24.9/km^{2} (64.4/sq mi)
- Demonym: Plesséens
- Time zone: UTC+01:00 (CET)
  - Summer (DST): UTC+02:00 (CEST)
- INSEE/Postal code: 95492 /95720
- ^{1} French Land Register data, which excludes lakes, ponds, glaciers > 1 km^{2} (0.386 sq mi or 247 acres) and river estuaries.

Le Plessis-Gassot (French pronunciation: [l(ə) plɛsi ɡaso]) is a rural commune in the Val-d'Oise department in the Île-de-France region of France.

== See also ==
- Communes of the Val-d'Oise department
