= Le Plessis-Luzarches =

- Commune
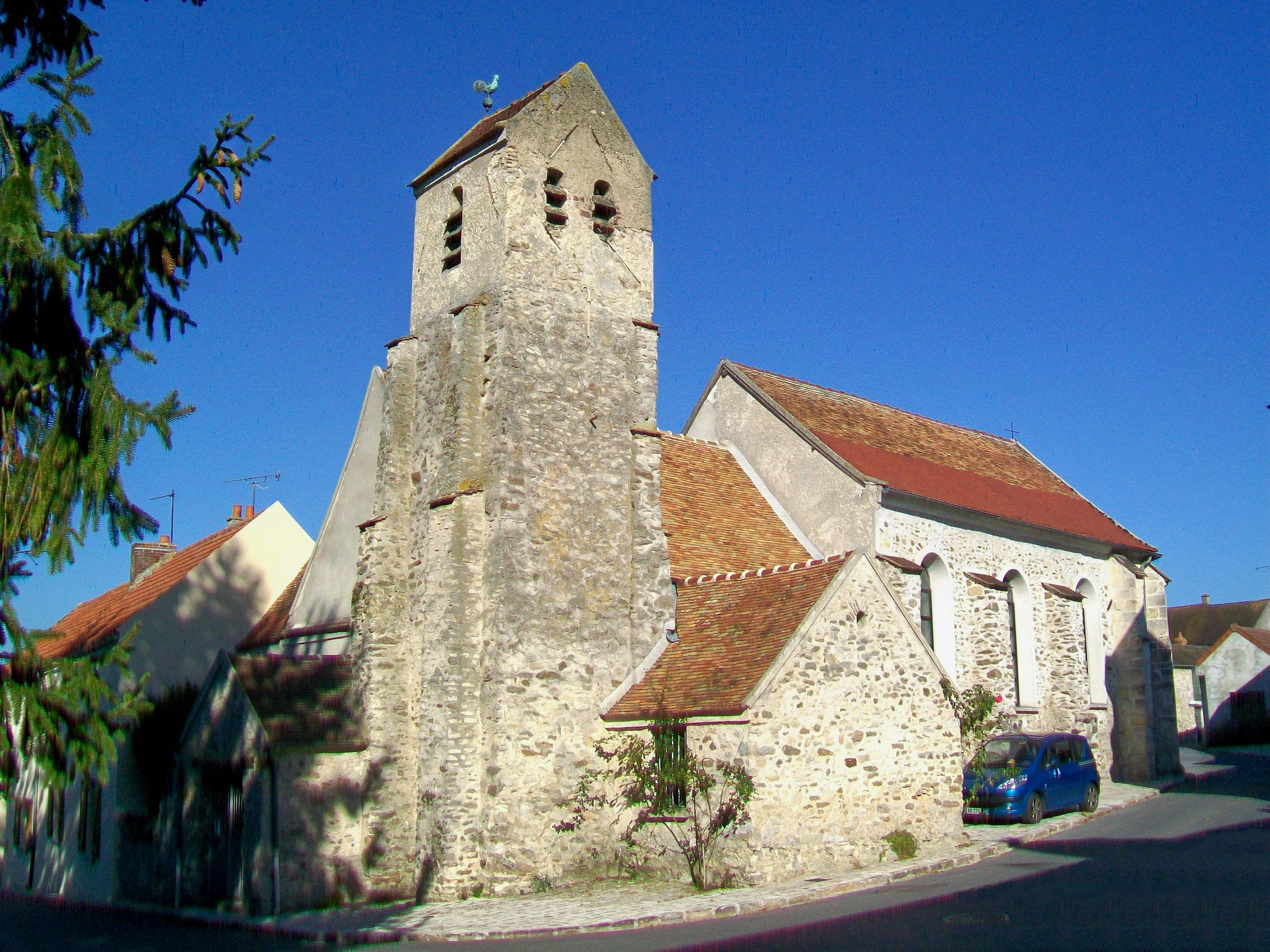
- The church of Sainte-Marie, in Le Plessis-Luzarches
- Location of Le Plessis-Luzarches
- Location within France Location within Île-de-France (region)
- Coordinates: 49°05′48″N 2°27′19″E
- Country: France
- Region: Île-de-France
- Department: Val-d'Oise
- Arrondissement: Sarcelles
- Canton: Fosses
- Intercommunality: Carnelle Pays de France

Government
  - Mayor (2020–2026): Patrick Fauvin
- Area^{1}: 0.90 km^{2} (0.35 sq mi)
- Population (2023): 152
  - Density: 170/km^{2} (440/sq mi)
- Time zone: UTC+01:00 (CET)
  - Summer (DST): UTC+02:00 (CEST)
- INSEE/Postal code: 95493 /95270
- ^{1} French Land Register data, which excludes lakes, ponds, glaciers > 1 km^{2} (0.386 sq mi or 247 acres) and river estuaries.

Le Plessis-Luzarches (French pronunciation: [lə plɛsi lyzaʁʃ]) is a commune in the Val-d'Oise département in Île-de-France in northern France.

== See also ==
- Communes of the Val-d'Oise department
