= Mareil-en-France =

- Commune
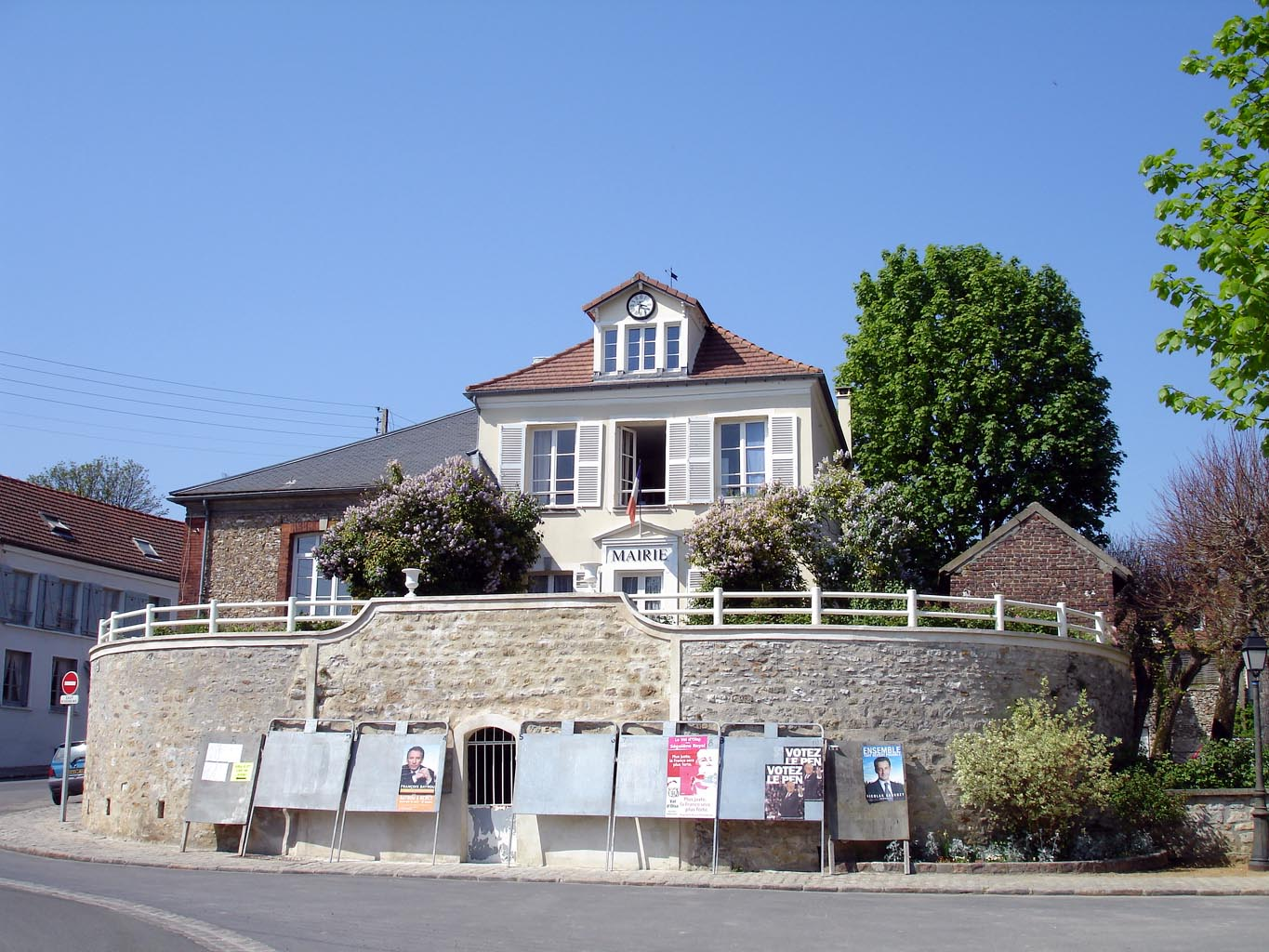
- The town hall of Mareil-en-France

- Coat of arms
- Location of Mareil-en-France
- Location within France Location within Île-de-France (region)
- Coordinates: 49°04′14″N 2°25′36″E
- Country: France
- Region: Île-de-France
- Department: Val-d'Oise
- Arrondissement: Sarcelles
- Canton: Fosses
- Intercommunality: CC Carnelle Pays de France

Government
  - Mayor (2020–2026): Chantal Romand
- Area^{1}: 7.00 km^{2} (2.70 sq mi)
- Population (2023): 734
  - Density: 105/km^{2} (272/sq mi)
- Demonym: Mareilloises
- Time zone: UTC+01:00 (CET)
  - Summer (DST): UTC+02:00 (CEST)
- INSEE/Postal code: 95365 /95850
- Website: mareil-en-france.fr
- ^{1} French Land Register data, which excludes lakes, ponds, glaciers > 1 km^{2} (0.386 sq mi or 247 acres) and river estuaries.

Mareil-en-France (French pronunciation: [maʁɛj ɑ̃ fʁɑ̃s]; lit. 'Mareil-in-France') is a commune in the Val-d'Oise department in Île-de-France in northern France.

== See also ==
- Communes of the Val-d'Oise department
