= Lassy, Val-d'Oise =

Lassy
- Commune
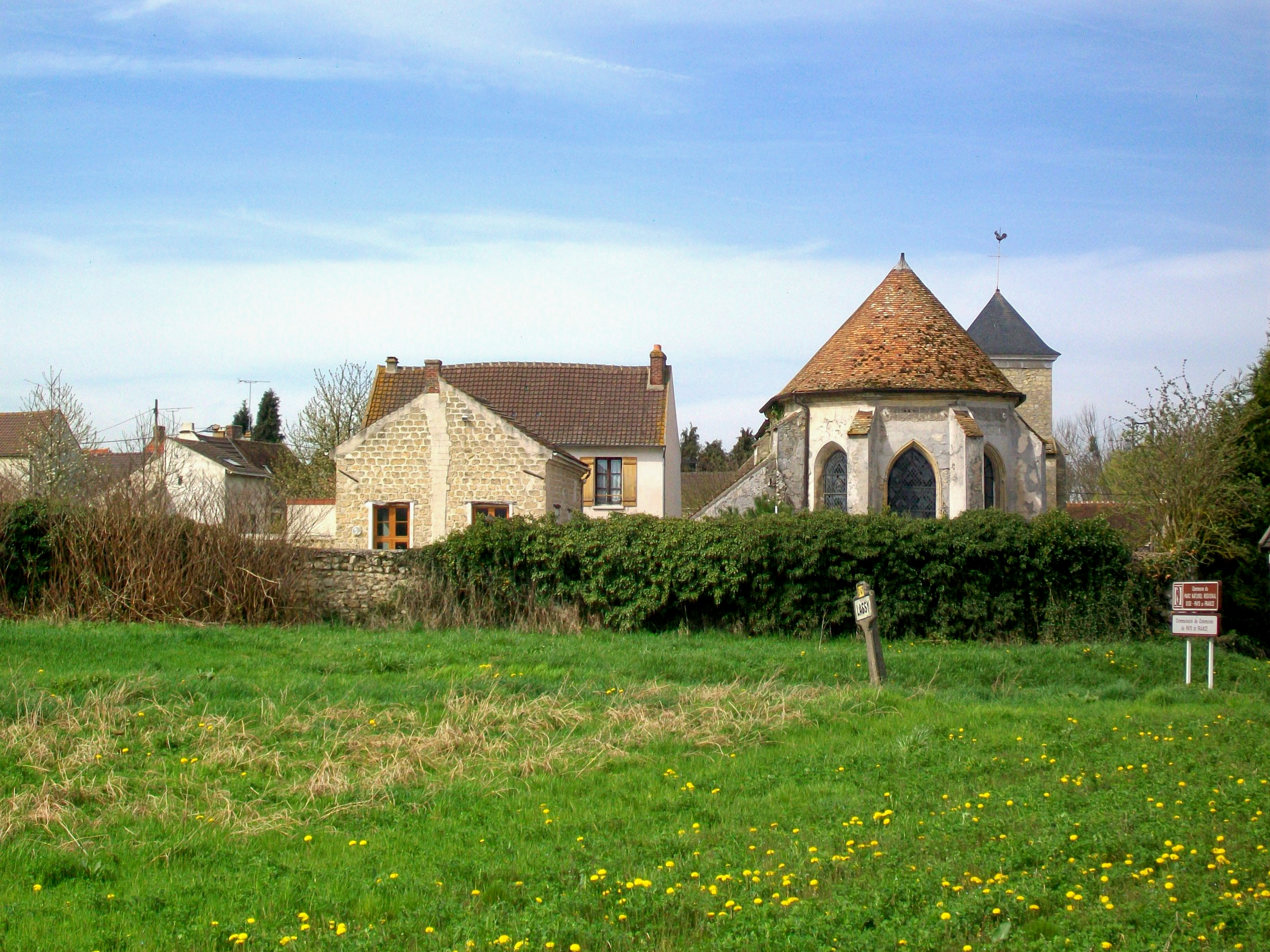
- The church and the old school, in Lassy

- Coat of arms
- Location of Lassy
- Location within France Location within Île-de-France (region)
- Coordinates: 49°05′52″N 2°26′48″E
- Country: France
- Region: Île-de-France
- Department: Val-d'Oise
- Arrondissement: Sarcelles
- Canton: Fosses

Government
  - Mayor (2020–2026): Gilbert Maugan
- Area^{1}: 1.92 km^{2} (0.74 sq mi)
- Population (2023): 196
  - Density: 102/km^{2} (264/sq mi)
- Time zone: UTC+01:00 (CET)
  - Summer (DST): UTC+02:00 (CEST)
- INSEE/Postal code: 95331 /95270
- ^{1} French Land Register data, which excludes lakes, ponds, glaciers > 1 km^{2} (0.386 sq mi or 247 acres) and river estuaries.

Lassy (French pronunciation: [lasi]) is a commune in the Val-d'Oise department and Île-de-France region of France.

== See also ==
- Communes of the Val-d'Oise department
