= Épinay-Champlâtreux =

- Commune
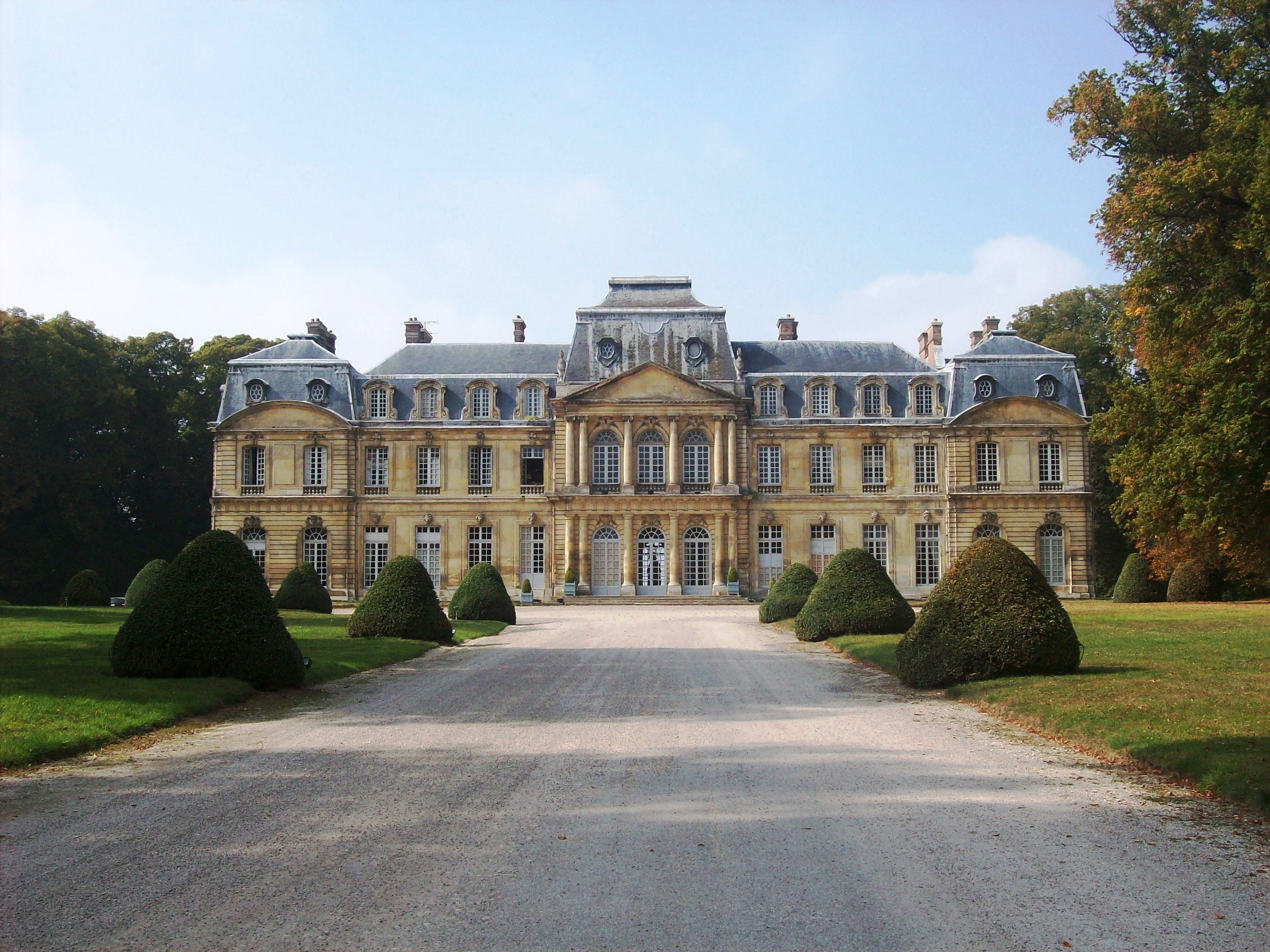
- Castle of Champlâtreux

- Coat of arms
- Location of Épinay-Champlâtreux
- Location within France Location within Île-de-France (region)
- Coordinates: 49°05′09″N 2°24′47″E
- Country: France
- Region: Île-de-France
- Department: Val-d'Oise
- Arrondissement: Sarcelles
- Canton: Fosses

Government
  - Mayor (2020–2026): Emmanuel de Noailles
- Area^{1}: 3.56 km^{2} (1.37 sq mi)
- Population (2023): 57
  - Density: 16/km^{2} (41/sq mi)
- Time zone: UTC+01:00 (CET)
  - Summer (DST): UTC+02:00 (CEST)
- INSEE/Postal code: 95214 /95270
- ^{1} French Land Register data, which excludes lakes, ponds, glaciers > 1 km^{2} (0.386 sq mi or 247 acres) and river estuaries.

Épinay-Champlâtreux (French pronunciation: [epinɛ ʃɑ̃platʁø]) is a commune in the Val-d'Oise department in Île-de-France in northern France.

== See also ==
- Communes of the Val-d'Oise department
