= Attainville =

- Commune
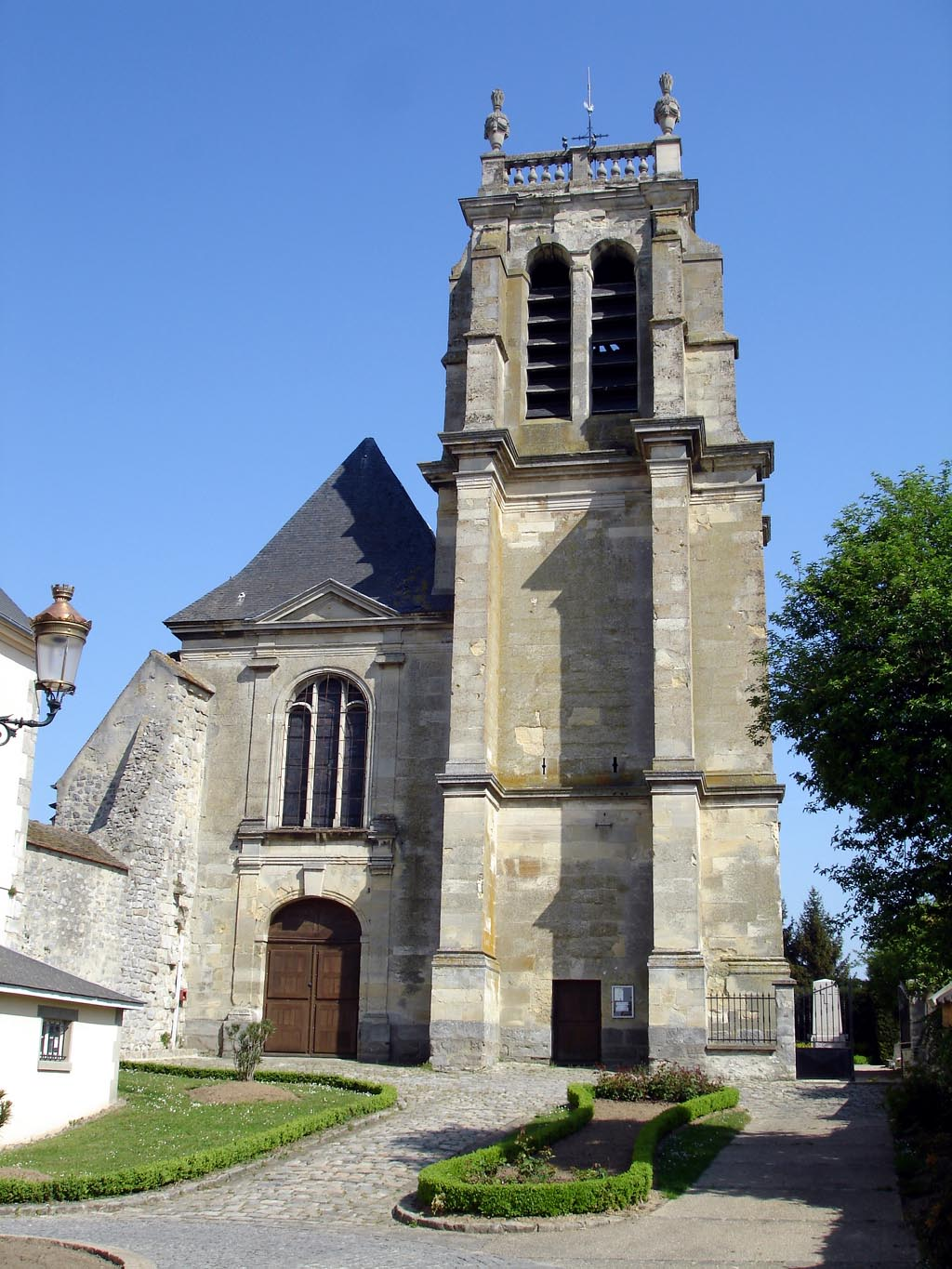
- The church of Attainville
- Location of Attainville
- Location within France Location within Île-de-France (region)
- Coordinates: 49°03′28″N 2°20′47″E
- Country: France
- Region: Île-de-France
- Department: Val-d'Oise
- Arrondissement: Sarcelles
- Canton: Fosses
- Intercommunality: CA Plaine Vallée

Government
  - Mayor (2020–2026): Yves Citerne
- Area^{1}: 7.16 km^{2} (2.76 sq mi)
- Population (2023): 1,904
  - Density: 266/km^{2} (689/sq mi)
- Time zone: UTC+01:00 (CET)
  - Summer (DST): UTC+02:00 (CEST)
- INSEE/Postal code: 95028 /95570
- ^{1} French Land Register data, which excludes lakes, ponds, glaciers > 1 km^{2} (0.386 sq mi or 247 acres) and river estuaries.

Attainville (French pronunciation: [atɛ̃vil]) is a commune in the Val-d'Oise department in Île-de-France in northern France.

== Population ==
Historical population

Year	Pop.	±% p.a.
1793	364	—
1821	314	−0.53%
1846	383	+0.80%
1872	346	−0.39%
1901	355	+0.09%
1926	407	+0.55%
1946	374	−0.42%
1954	413	+1.25%
1962	455	+1.22%

Year	Pop.	±% p.a.
1968	503	+1.69%
1975	504	+0.03%
1982	589	+2.25%
1990	1,375	+11.18%
1999	1,732	+2.60%
2007	1,819	+0.61%
2012	1,820	+0.01%
2017	1,702	−1.33%
2023	1,904	+1.89%

Source: EHESS and INSEE (1968-2023)

== See also ==
- Communes of the Val-d'Oise department
