= Jagny-sous-Bois =

- Commune
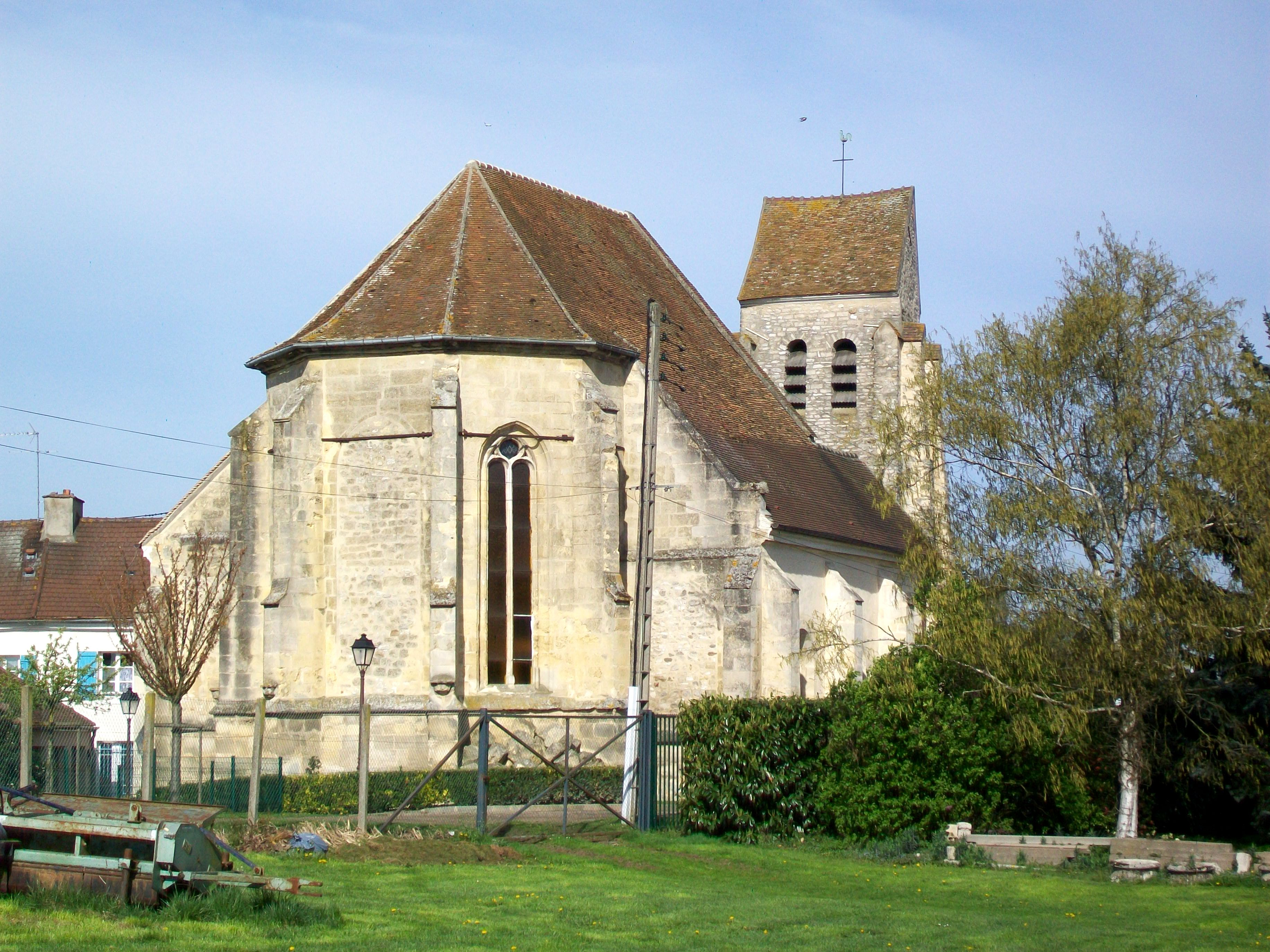
- The church of Saint-Léger, in Jagny-sous-Bois

- Coat of arms
- Location of Jagny-sous-Bois
- Location within France Location within Île-de-France (region)
- Coordinates: 49°04′43″N 2°26′39″E
- Country: France
- Region: Île-de-France
- Department: Val-d'Oise
- Arrondissement: Sarcelles
- Canton: Fosses
- Intercommunality: Carnelle Pays de France

Government
  - Mayor (2020–2026): Jacqueline Hollinger
- Area^{1}: 4.18 km^{2} (1.61 sq mi)
- Population (2023): 269
  - Density: 64.4/km^{2} (167/sq mi)
- Time zone: UTC+01:00 (CET)
  - Summer (DST): UTC+02:00 (CEST)
- INSEE/Postal code: 95316 /95850
- ^{1} French Land Register data, which excludes lakes, ponds, glaciers > 1 km^{2} (0.386 sq mi or 247 acres) and river estuaries.

Jagny-sous-Bois (French pronunciation: [ʒaɲi su bwa]) is a commune in the Val-d'Oise department and Île-de-France region of France.

== Geography ==
=== Climate ===
Jagny-sous-Bois has an oceanic climate (Köppen climate classification Cfb). The average annual temperature in Jagny-sous-Bois is 11.0 °C (51.8 °F). The average annual rainfall is 714.8 mm (28.14 in) with October as the wettest month. The temperatures are highest on average in July, at around 19.0 °C (66.2 °F), and lowest in January, at around 3.6 °C (38.5 °F). The highest temperature ever recorded in Jagny-sous-Bois was 40.4 °C (104.7 °F) on 25 July 2019; the coldest temperature ever recorded was −19.0 °C (−2.2 °F) on 17 January 1985.

Climate data for Jagny-sous-Bois (1981−2010 normals, extremes 1967−2021)
Month	Jan	Feb	Mar	Apr	May	Jun	Jul	Aug	Sep	Oct	Nov	Dec	Year
Record high °C (°F)	15.8 (60.4)	19.7 (67.5)	22.7 (72.9)	29.0 (84.2)	31.4 (88.5)	36.1 (97.0)	40.4 (104.7)	39.8 (103.6)	34.0 (93.2)	28.4 (83.1)	20.6 (69.1)	16.2 (61.2)	40.4 (104.7)
Mean daily maximum °C (°F)	6.1 (43.0)	7.2 (45.0)	11.4 (52.5)	14.7 (58.5)	18.8 (65.8)	21.9 (71.4)	24.7 (76.5)	24.5 (76.1)	20.5 (68.9)	15.6 (60.1)	9.8 (49.6)	6.4 (43.5)	15.2 (59.4)
Daily mean °C (°F)	3.6 (38.5)	4.2 (39.6)	7.5 (45.5)	9.9 (49.8)	13.7 (56.7)	16.6 (61.9)	19.0 (66.2)	18.9 (66.0)	15.5 (59.9)	11.7 (53.1)	6.9 (44.4)	4.1 (39.4)	11.0 (51.8)
Mean daily minimum °C (°F)	1.1 (34.0)	1.2 (34.2)	3.6 (38.5)	5.1 (41.2)	8.7 (47.7)	11.4 (52.5)	13.3 (55.9)	13.2 (55.8)	10.5 (50.9)	7.8 (46.0)	4.0 (39.2)	1.8 (35.2)	6.8 (44.2)
Record low °C (°F)	−19.0 (−2.2)	−13.7 (7.3)	−11.2 (11.8)	−3.8 (25.2)	−0.8 (30.6)	2.0 (35.6)	6.2 (43.2)	5.4 (41.7)	2.0 (35.6)	−4.7 (23.5)	−10.1 (13.8)	−12.3 (9.9)	−19.0 (−2.2)
Average precipitation mm (inches)	63.1 (2.48)	49.6 (1.95)	56.5 (2.22)	55.4 (2.18)	66.2 (2.61)	53.7 (2.11)	61.8 (2.43)	52.6 (2.07)	51.8 (2.04)	73.6 (2.90)	59.4 (2.34)	71.1 (2.80)	714.8 (28.14)
Average precipitation days (≥ 1.0 mm)	11.4	9.8	10.9	9.9	10.4	9.0	8.1	8.3	8.5	10.4	10.5	11.8	119.1
Source: Météo-France

== Population ==
Historical population
Year	Pop.	±% p.a.
1968	195	—
1975	183	−0.90%
1982	179	−0.32%
1990	218	+2.49%
1999	224	+0.30%
2007	259	+1.83%
2012	250	−0.70%
2017	258	+0.63%
2023	269	+0.70%
Source: INSEE

== See also ==
- Communes of the Val-d'Oise department
