= Morangles =

- Commune
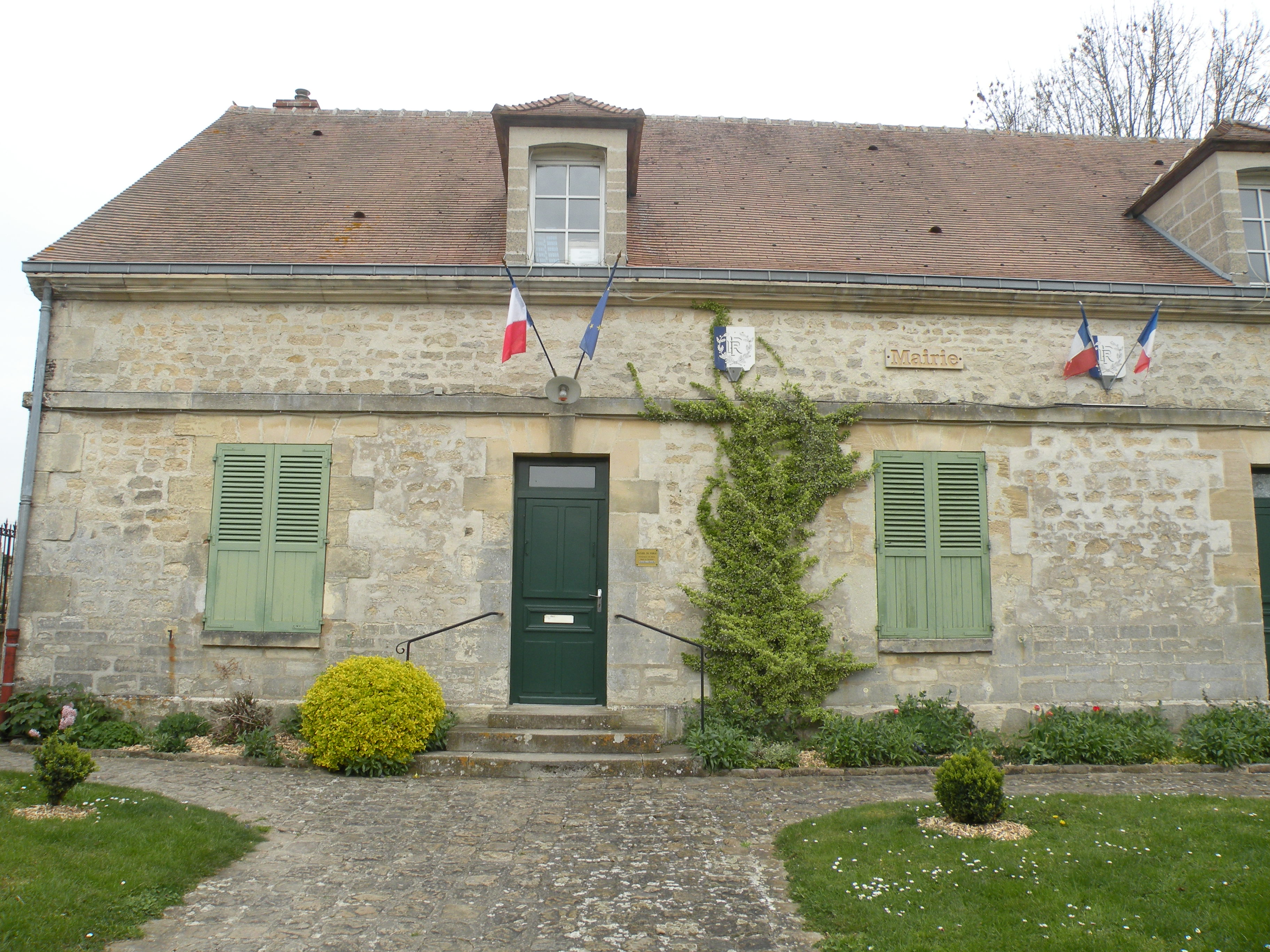
- The town hall in Morangles
- Location of Morangles
- Location within France Location within Hauts-de-France
- Coordinates: 49°11′48″N 2°17′44″E
- Country: France
- Region: Hauts-de-France
- Department: Oise
- Arrondissement: Senlis
- Canton: Chantilly
- Intercommunality: CC Thelloise

Government
  - Mayor (2020–2026): Marianne Lemoine
- Area^{1}: 5.93 km^{2} (2.29 sq mi)
- Elevation: 92 m (302 ft)
- Highest elevation: 112 m (367 ft)
- Lowest elevation: 62 m (203 ft)
- Population (2023): 412
  - Density: 69.5/km^{2} (180/sq mi)
- Time zone: UTC+01:00 (CET)
  - Summer (DST): UTC+02:00 (CEST)
- INSEE/Postal code: 60429 /60530
- ^{1} French Land Register data, which excludes lakes, ponds, glaciers > 1 km^{2} (0.386 sq mi or 247 acres) and river estuaries.

Morangles (French pronunciation: [mɔʁɑ̃ɡl]) is a commune in the Oise department in northern France.

== See also ==
- Communes of the Oise department
