= Villiers-le-Sec, Val-d'Oise =

Villiers-le-Sec
- Commune
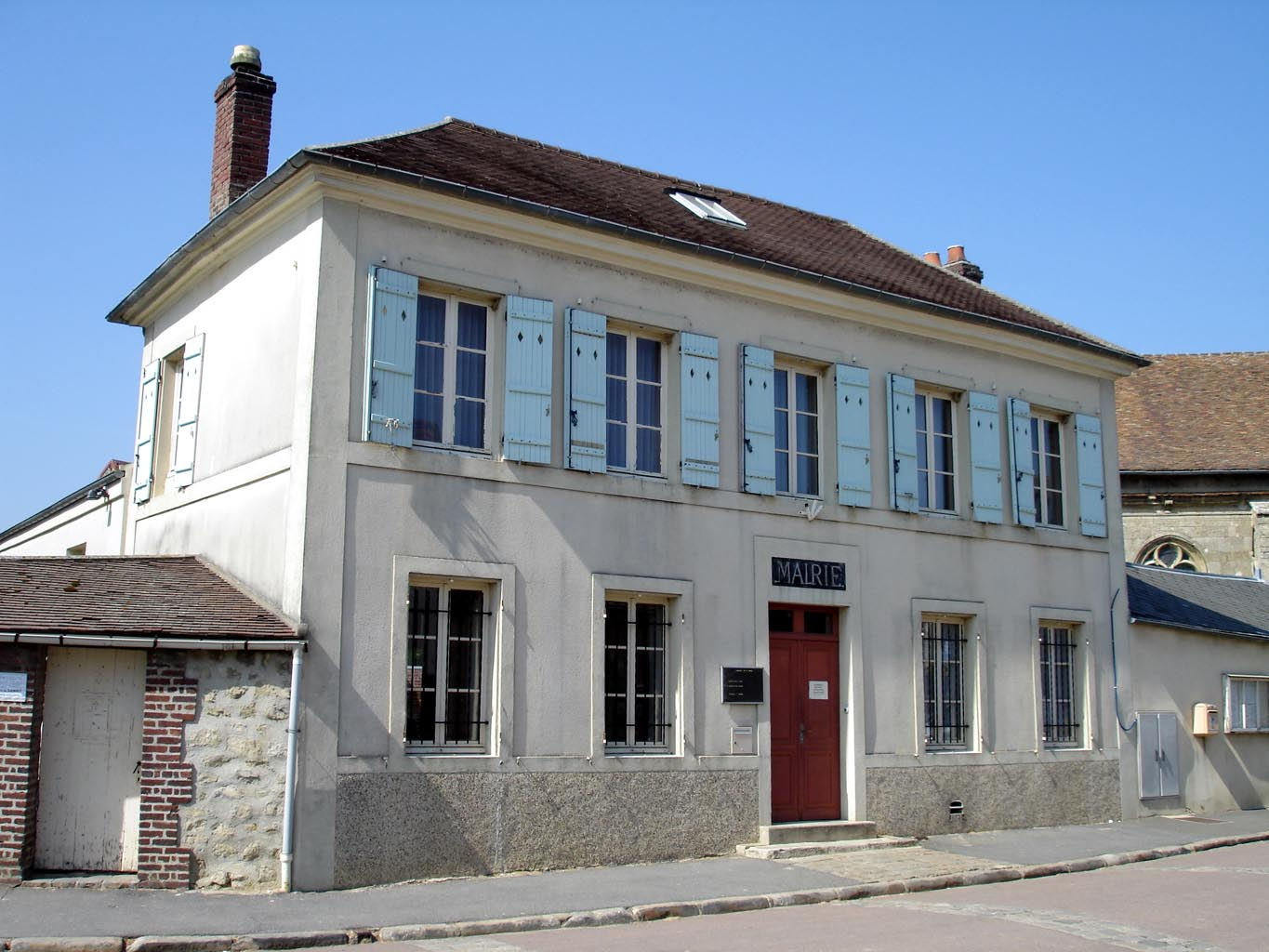
- The town hall of Villiers-le-Sec
- Location of Villiers-le-Sec
- Location within France Location within Île-de-France (region)
- Coordinates: 49°04′24″N 2°23′25″E
- Country: France
- Region: Île-de-France
- Department: Val-d'Oise
- Arrondissement: Sarcelles
- Canton: Fosses

Government
  - Mayor (2020–2026): Cyril Diarra
- Area^{1}: 3.26 km^{2} (1.26 sq mi)
- Population (2023): 205
  - Density: 62.9/km^{2} (163/sq mi)
- Time zone: UTC+01:00 (CET)
  - Summer (DST): UTC+02:00 (CEST)
- INSEE/Postal code: 95682 /95720
- ^{1} French Land Register data, which excludes lakes, ponds, glaciers > 1 km^{2} (0.386 sq mi or 247 acres) and river estuaries.

Villiers-le-Sec (French pronunciation: [vilje lə sɛk]) is a commune in the Val-d'Oise department in Île-de-France in northern France.

== See also ==
- Communes of the Val-d'Oise department
