= Chaumontel =

- Commune
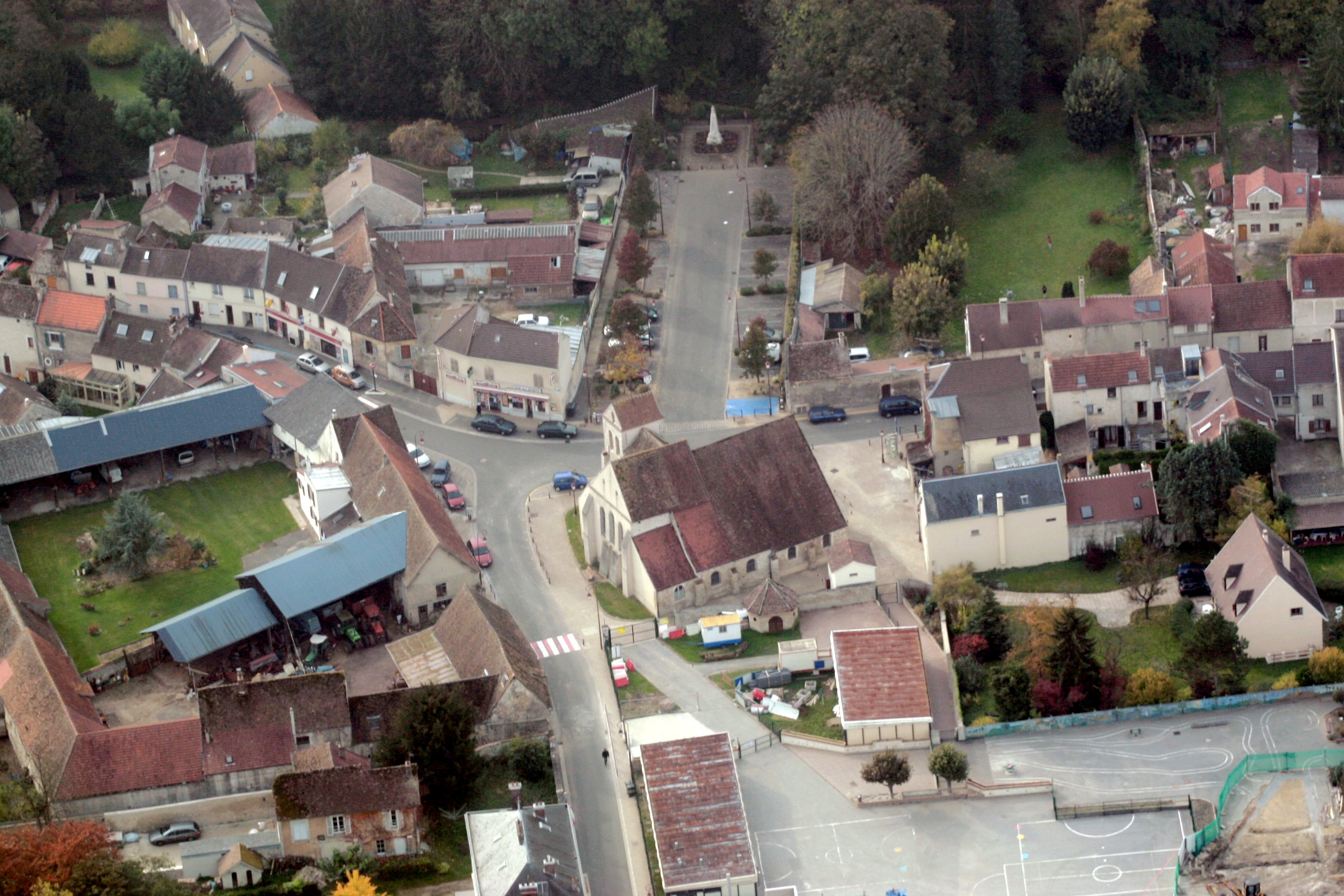
- An aerial view of the area around the church in Chaumontel

- Coat of arms
- Location of Chaumontel
- Location within France Location within Île-de-France (region)
- Coordinates: 49°07′39″N 2°25′47″E
- Country: France
- Region: Île-de-France
- Department: Val-d'Oise
- Arrondissement: Sarcelles
- Canton: Fosses

Government
  - Mayor (2020–2026): Sylvain Saragosa
- Area^{1}: 4.23 km^{2} (1.63 sq mi)
- Population (2023): 3,332
  - Density: 788/km^{2} (2,040/sq mi)
- Time zone: UTC+01:00 (CET)
  - Summer (DST): UTC+02:00 (CEST)
- INSEE/Postal code: 95149 /95270
- ^{1} French Land Register data, which excludes lakes, ponds, glaciers > 1 km^{2} (0.386 sq mi or 247 acres) and river estuaries.

Chaumontel (French pronunciation: [ʃomɔ̃tɛl]) is a commune in the Val-d'Oise department in Île-de-France in northern France.

== Population ==
Historical population
Year	Pop.	±% p.a.
1968	869	—
1975	1,463	+7.73%
1982	2,347	+6.99%
1990	2,933	+2.83%
1999	3,250	+1.15%
2007	3,275	+0.10%
2012	3,317	+0.26%
2017	3,261	−0.34%
2023	3,332	+0.36%
Source: INSEE

== See also ==
- Communes of the Val-d'Oise department
