= Bellefontaine, Val-d'Oise =

Bellefontaine
- Commune
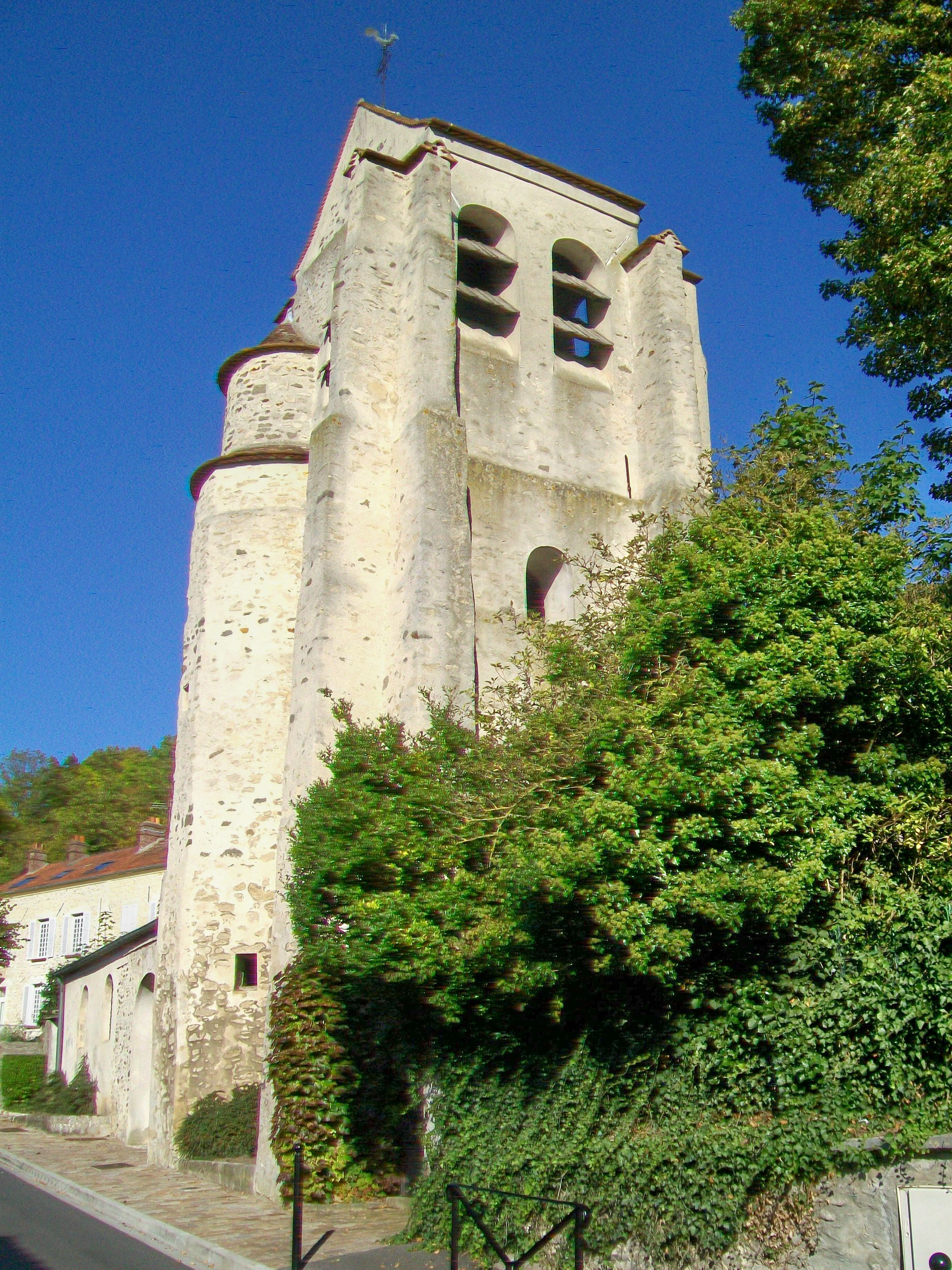
- The tower of the church of Saint-Nicolas, in Bellefontaine

- Coat of arms
- Location of Bellefontaine
- Location within France Location within Île-de-France (region)
- Coordinates: 49°05′54″N 2°28′04″E
- Country: France
- Region: Île-de-France
- Department: Val-d'Oise
- Arrondissement: Sarcelles
- Canton: Fosses

Government
  - Mayor (2020–2026): Jean-Nöel Duclos
- Area^{1}: 7.53 km^{2} (2.91 sq mi)
- Population (2023): 474
  - Density: 62.9/km^{2} (163/sq mi)
- Time zone: UTC+01:00 (CET)
  - Summer (DST): UTC+02:00 (CEST)
- INSEE/Postal code: 95055 /95270
- ^{1} French Land Register data, which excludes lakes, ponds, glaciers > 1 km^{2} (0.386 sq mi or 247 acres) and river estuaries.

Bellefontaine (French pronunciation: [bɛlfɔ̃tɛn]) is a commune in the Val-d'Oise department in Île-de-France in northern France.

== See also ==
- Communes of the Val-d'Oise department
