= Seugy =

- Commune
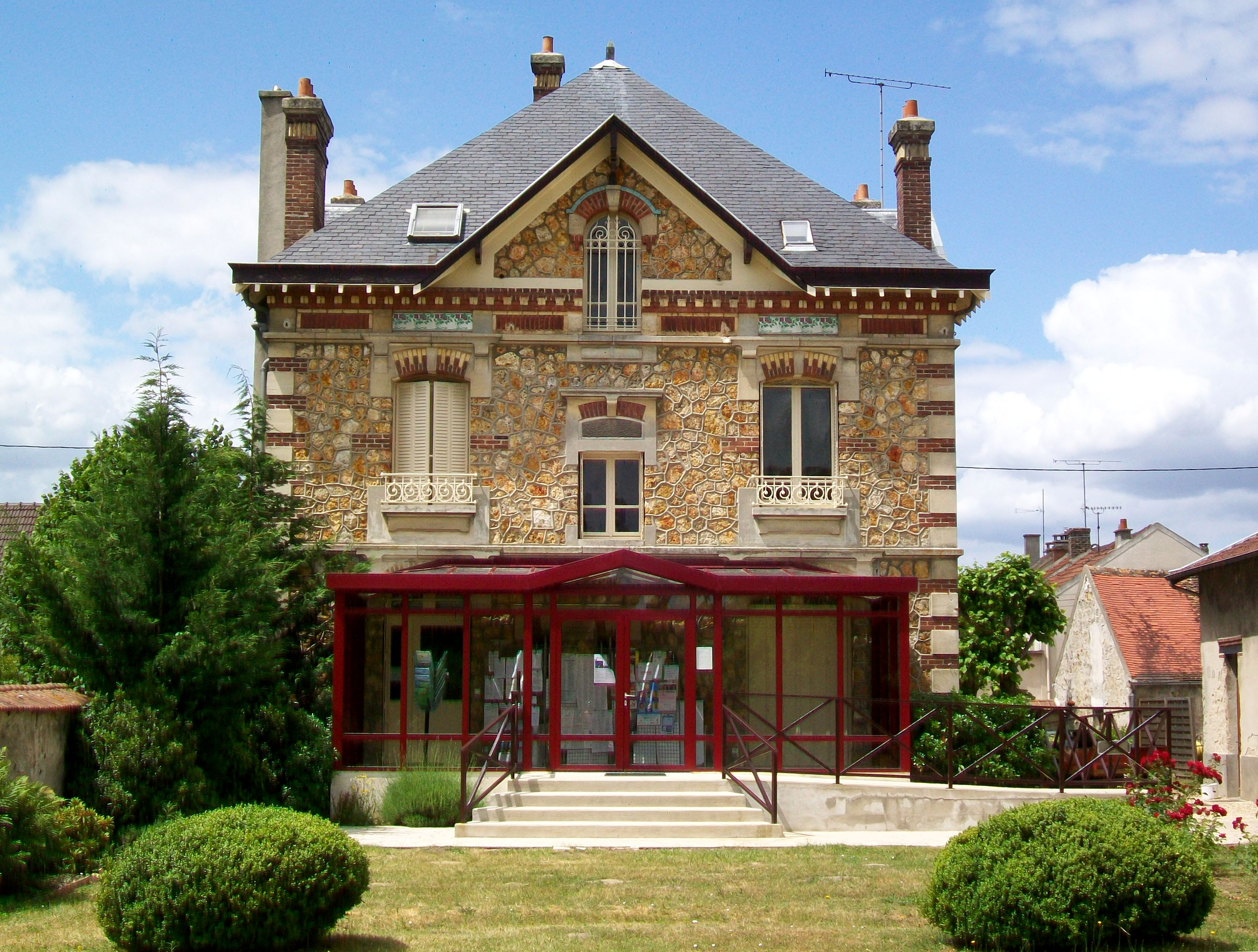
- The town hall of Seugy
- Location of Seugy
- Location within France Location within Île-de-France (region)
- Coordinates: 49°07′19″N 2°23′41″E
- Country: France
- Region: Île-de-France
- Department: Val-d'Oise
- Arrondissement: Sarcelles
- Canton: Fosses
- Intercommunality: Carnelle Pays de France

Government
  - Mayor (2020–2026): Jacques Alati
- Area^{1}: 1.70 km^{2} (0.66 sq mi)
- Population (2023): 1,044
  - Density: 614/km^{2} (1,590/sq mi)
- Time zone: UTC+01:00 (CET)
  - Summer (DST): UTC+02:00 (CEST)
- INSEE/Postal code: 95594 /95270
- ^{1} French Land Register data, which excludes lakes, ponds, glaciers > 1 km^{2} (0.386 sq mi or 247 acres) and river estuaries.

Seugy (French pronunciation: [søʒi]) is a commune in the Val-d'Oise department in Île-de-France in northern France. Seugy station has rail connections to Luzarches, Sarcelles and Paris.

== See also ==
- Communes of the Val-d'Oise department
