= Baillet-en-France =

- Commune
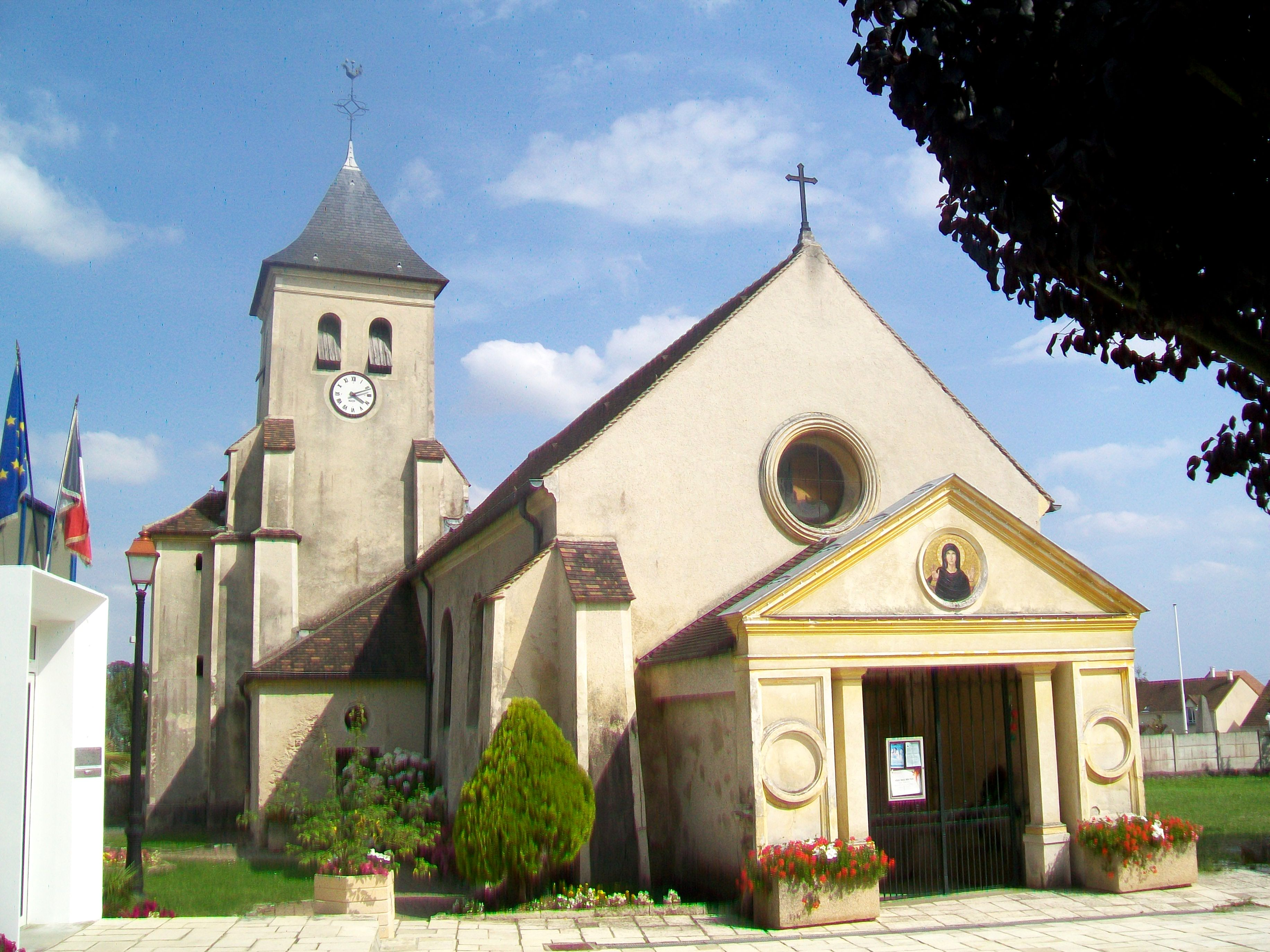
- The church of Saint-Martin, in Baillet-en-France

- Coat of arms
- Location of Baillet-en-France
- Location within France Location within Île-de-France (region)
- Coordinates: 49°03′46″N 2°18′01″E
- Country: France
- Region: Île-de-France
- Department: Val-d'Oise
- Arrondissement: Sarcelles
- Canton: Domont
- Intercommunality: Carnelle Pays de France

Government
  - Mayor (2020–2026): Christiane Aknouche
- Area^{1}: 7.91 km^{2} (3.05 sq mi)
- Population (2023): 2,021
  - Density: 255/km^{2} (662/sq mi)
- Time zone: UTC+01:00 (CET)
  - Summer (DST): UTC+02:00 (CEST)
- INSEE/Postal code: 95042 /95560
- ^{1} French Land Register data, which excludes lakes, ponds, glaciers > 1 km^{2} (0.386 sq mi or 247 acres) and river estuaries.

Baillet-en-France (French pronunciation: [bajɛ ɑ̃ fʁɑ̃s], lit. 'Baillet in France') is a commune in the Val-d'Oise department in Île-de-France in northern France.

== Population ==
Historical population
Year	Pop.	±% p.a.
1968	451	—
1975	1,472	+18.41%
1982	1,495	+0.22%
1990	1,409	−0.74%
1999	1,710	+2.17%
2007	1,868	+1.11%
2012	2,020	+1.58%
2017	1,957	−0.63%
2023	2,021	+0.54%
Source: INSEE

== See also ==
- Communes of the Val-d'Oise department
