= Villaines-sous-Bois =

- Commune
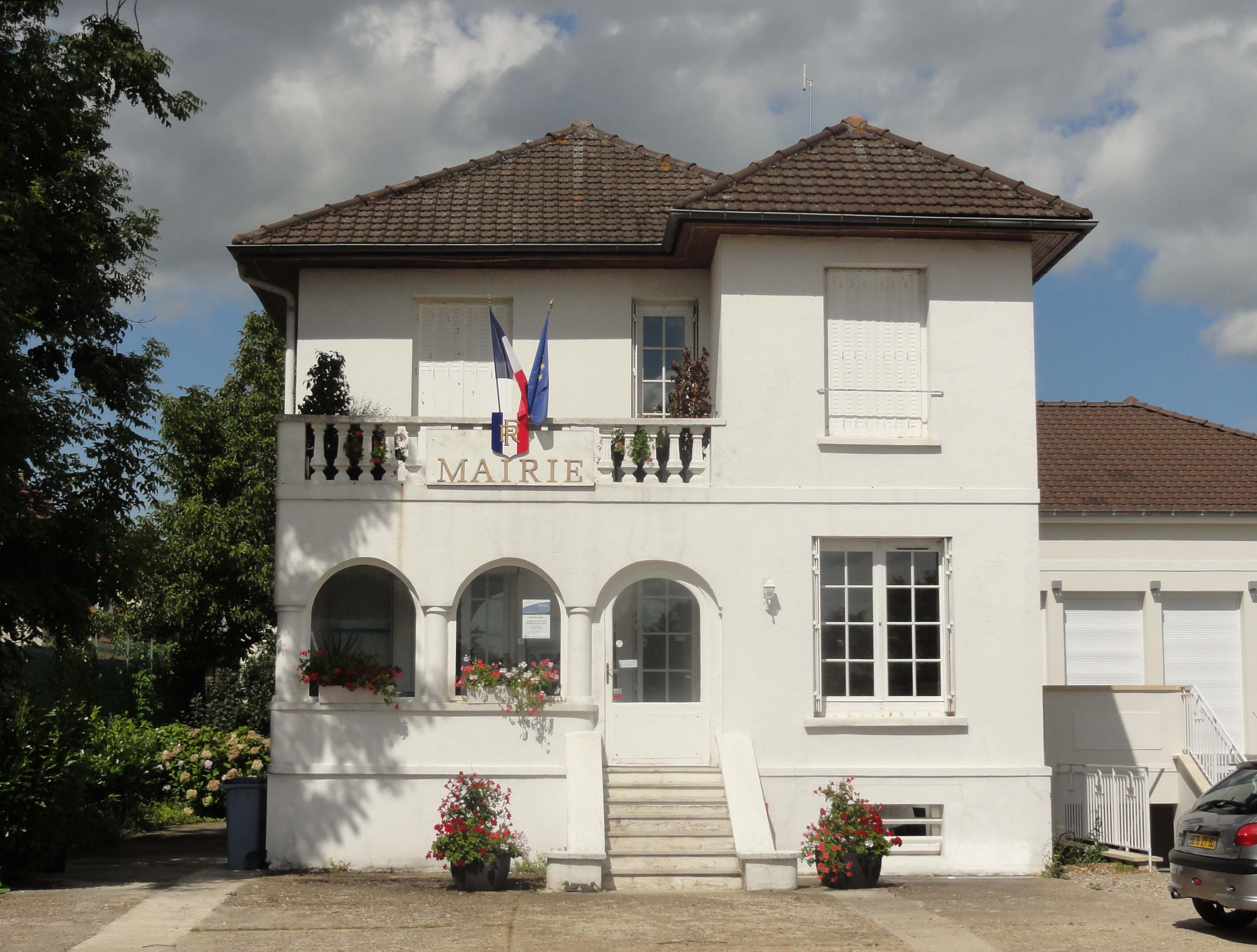
- The new town hall of Villaines-sous-Bois, opened in 2012

- Coat of arms
- Location of Villaines-sous-Bois
- Location within France Location within Île-de-France (region)
- Coordinates: 49°04′39″N 2°21′30″E
- Country: France
- Region: Île-de-France
- Department: Val-d'Oise
- Arrondissement: Sarcelles
- Canton: Fosses
- Intercommunality: Carnelle Pays de France

Government
  - Mayor (2020–2026): Patrice Robin
- Area^{1}: 1.89 km^{2} (0.73 sq mi)
- Population (2023): 778
  - Density: 412/km^{2} (1,070/sq mi)
- Time zone: UTC+01:00 (CET)
  - Summer (DST): UTC+02:00 (CEST)
- INSEE/Postal code: 95660 /95570
- ^{1} French Land Register data, which excludes lakes, ponds, glaciers > 1 km^{2} (0.386 sq mi or 247 acres) and river estuaries.

Villaines-sous-Bois (French pronunciation: [vilɛn su bwa]) is a commune in the Val-d'Oise department in Île-de-France in northern France. Villaines station has rail connections to Luzarches, Sarcelles and Paris.

== Geography ==
=== Climate ===
Villaines-sous-Bois has an oceanic climate (Köppen climate classification Cfb). The average annual temperature in Villaines-sous-Bois is 11.4 °C (52.5 °F). The average annual rainfall is 709.7 mm (27.94 in) with December as the wettest month. The temperatures are highest on average in August, at around 19.2 °C (66.6 °F), and lowest in January, at around 4.0 °C (39.2 °F). The highest temperature ever recorded in Villaines-sous-Bois was 41.6 °C (106.9 °F) on 25 July 2019; the coldest temperature ever recorded was −13.5 °C (7.7 °F) on 1 January 1997.

Climate data for Villaines-sous-Bois (1981−2010 normals, extremes 1987−2021)
Month	Jan	Feb	Mar	Apr	May	Jun	Jul	Aug	Sep	Oct	Nov	Dec	Year
Record high °C (°F)	15.9 (60.6)	21.2 (70.2)	24.8 (76.6)	29.6 (85.3)	31.6 (88.9)	38.2 (100.8)	41.6 (106.9)	39.2 (102.6)	34.9 (94.8)	30.1 (86.2)	22.1 (71.8)	16.6 (61.9)	41.6 (106.9)
Mean daily maximum °C (°F)	6.5 (43.7)	8.3 (46.9)	12.0 (53.6)	15.5 (59.9)	19.6 (67.3)	22.3 (72.1)	24.9 (76.8)	25.1 (77.2)	21.1 (70.0)	16.2 (61.2)	10.3 (50.5)	6.7 (44.1)	15.7 (60.3)
Daily mean °C (°F)	4.0 (39.2)	5.1 (41.2)	7.9 (46.2)	10.4 (50.7)	14.2 (57.6)	16.8 (62.2)	19.1 (66.4)	19.2 (66.6)	15.8 (60.4)	12.0 (53.6)	7.2 (45.0)	4.3 (39.7)	11.4 (52.5)
Mean daily minimum °C (°F)	1.5 (34.7)	1.9 (35.4)	3.7 (38.7)	5.3 (41.5)	8.9 (48.0)	11.3 (52.3)	13.3 (55.9)	13.2 (55.8)	10.5 (50.9)	7.8 (46.0)	4.1 (39.4)	2.0 (35.6)	7.0 (44.6)
Record low °C (°F)	−13.5 (7.7)	−13.3 (8.1)	−10.8 (12.6)	−3.9 (25.0)	−0.6 (30.9)	1.2 (34.2)	4.9 (40.8)	3.9 (39.0)	1.7 (35.1)	−2.8 (27.0)	−9.7 (14.5)	−11.6 (11.1)	−13.5 (7.7)
Average precipitation mm (inches)	59.3 (2.33)	54.4 (2.14)	55.9 (2.20)	56.6 (2.23)	61.2 (2.41)	53.8 (2.12)	61.5 (2.42)	60.9 (2.40)	48.8 (1.92)	68.7 (2.70)	59.8 (2.35)	68.8 (2.71)	709.7 (27.94)
Average precipitation days (≥ 1.0 mm)	11.0	10.7	10.8	9.6	9.3	9.3	8.8	8.8	8.5	10.2	11.1	11.4	119.5
Source: Météo-France

== See also ==
- Communes of the Val-d'Oise department
