= Ézanville =

- Commune
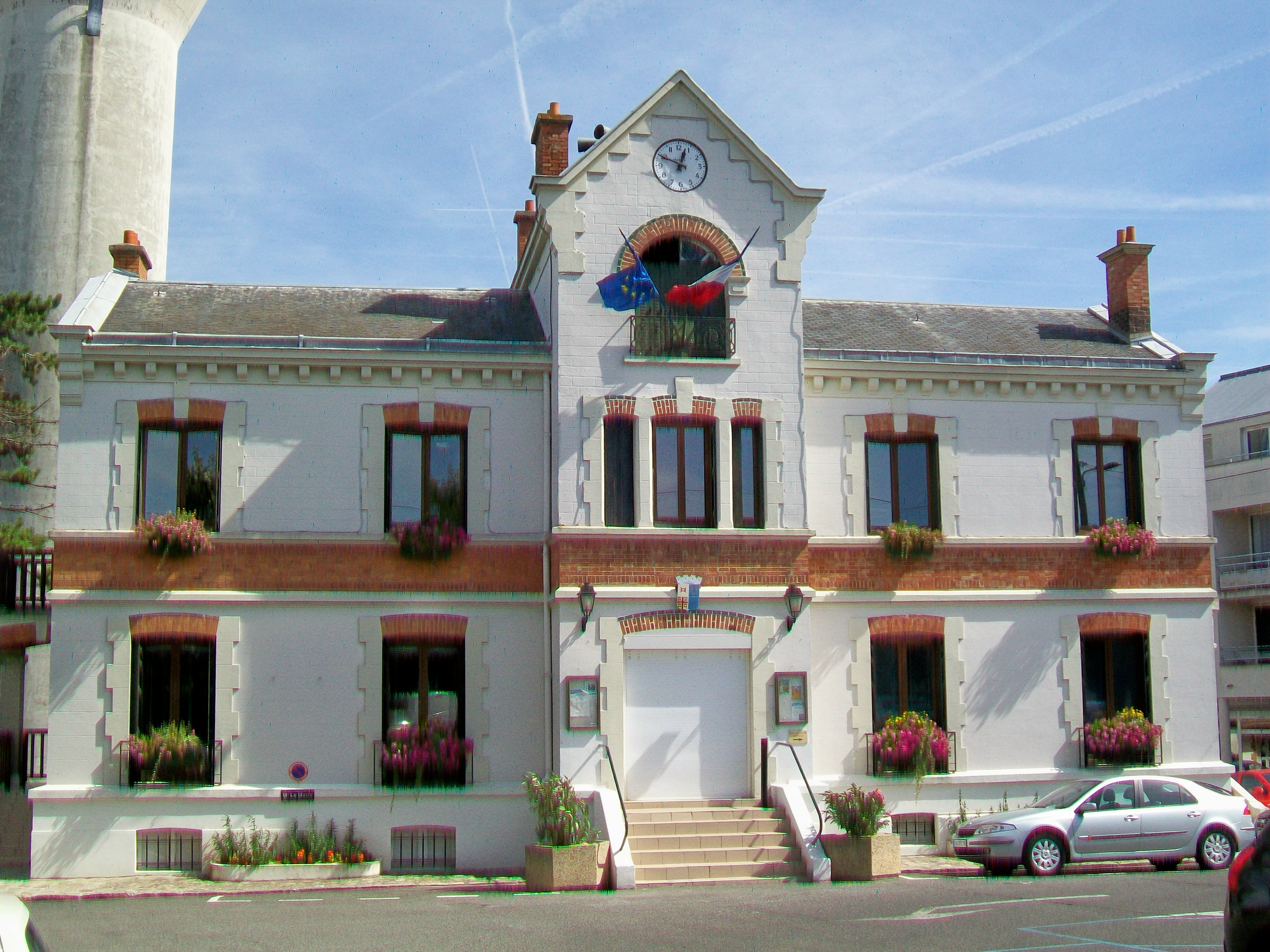
- The town hall

- Coat of arms
- Location of Ézanville
- Location within France Location within Île-de-France (region)
- Coordinates: 49°01′43″N 2°21′42″E
- Country: France
- Region: Île-de-France
- Department: Val-d'Oise
- Arrondissement: Sarcelles
- Canton: Fosses
- Intercommunality: CA Plaine Vallée

Government
  - Mayor (2020–2026): Éric Battaglia
- Area^{1}: 5.19 km^{2} (2.00 sq mi)
- Population (2023): 9,858
  - Density: 1,900/km^{2} (4,920/sq mi)
- Time zone: UTC+01:00 (CET)
  - Summer (DST): UTC+02:00 (CEST)
- INSEE/Postal code: 95229 /95460
- ^{1} French Land Register data, which excludes lakes, ponds, glaciers > 1 km^{2} (0.386 sq mi or 247 acres) and river estuaries.

Ézanville (French pronunciation: [ezɑ̃vil]) is a commune in the Val-d'Oise department in Île-de-France in northern France. Écouen - Ézanville station has rail connections to Persan, Luzarches, Sarcelles and Paris.

== Population ==
Historical population
Year	Pop.	±% p.a.
1968	4,511	—
1975	6,940	+6.35%
1982	8,003	+2.06%
1990	9,153	+1.69%
1999	8,825	−0.40%
2007	9,113	+0.40%
2012	9,316	+0.44%
2017	9,775	+0.97%
2023	9,858	+0.14%
Source: INSEE

== See also ==
- Communes of the Val-d'Oise department
