= Maffliers =

- Commune
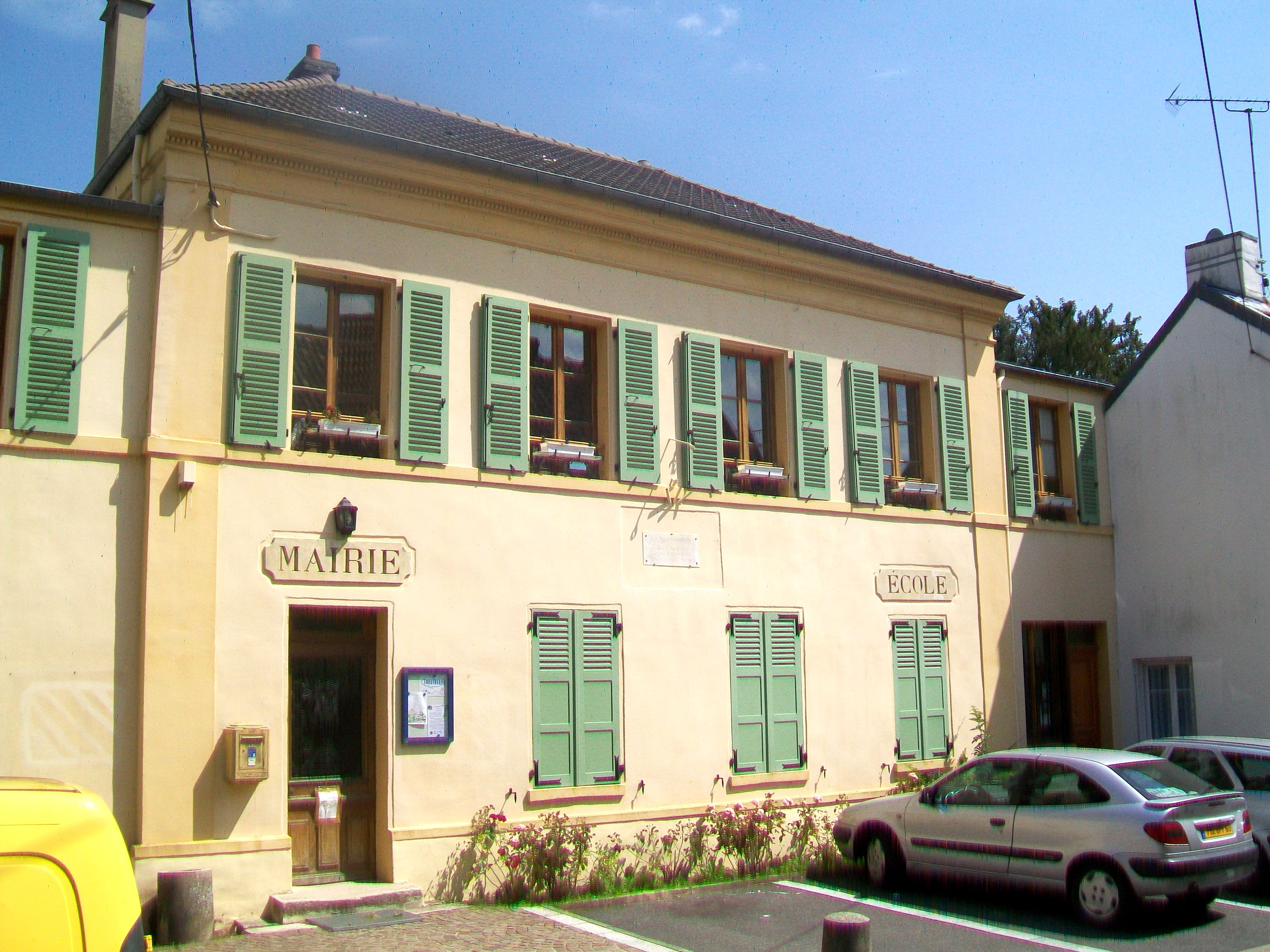
- The town hall of Maffliers

- Coat of arms
- Location of Maffliers
- Location within France Location within Île-de-France (region)
- Coordinates: 49°04′41″N 2°18′30″E
- Country: France
- Region: Île-de-France
- Department: Val-d'Oise
- Arrondissement: Sarcelles
- Canton: Fosses
- Intercommunality: Carnelle Pays de France

Government
  - Mayor (2020–2026): Jean-Christophe Mazurier
- Area^{1}: 6.79 km^{2} (2.62 sq mi)
- Population (2023): 1,856
  - Density: 273/km^{2} (708/sq mi)
- Time zone: UTC+01:00 (CET)
  - Summer (DST): UTC+02:00 (CEST)
- INSEE/Postal code: 95353 /95560
- ^{1} French Land Register data, which excludes lakes, ponds, glaciers > 1 km^{2} (0.386 sq mi or 247 acres) and river estuaries.

Maffliers (French pronunciation: [maflije]) is a commune in the Val-d'Oise department in Île-de-France in northern France.

== See also ==
- Communes of the Val-d'Oise department
