= Saint-Martin-du-Tertre, Val-d'Oise =

Saint-Martin-du-Tertre
- Commune
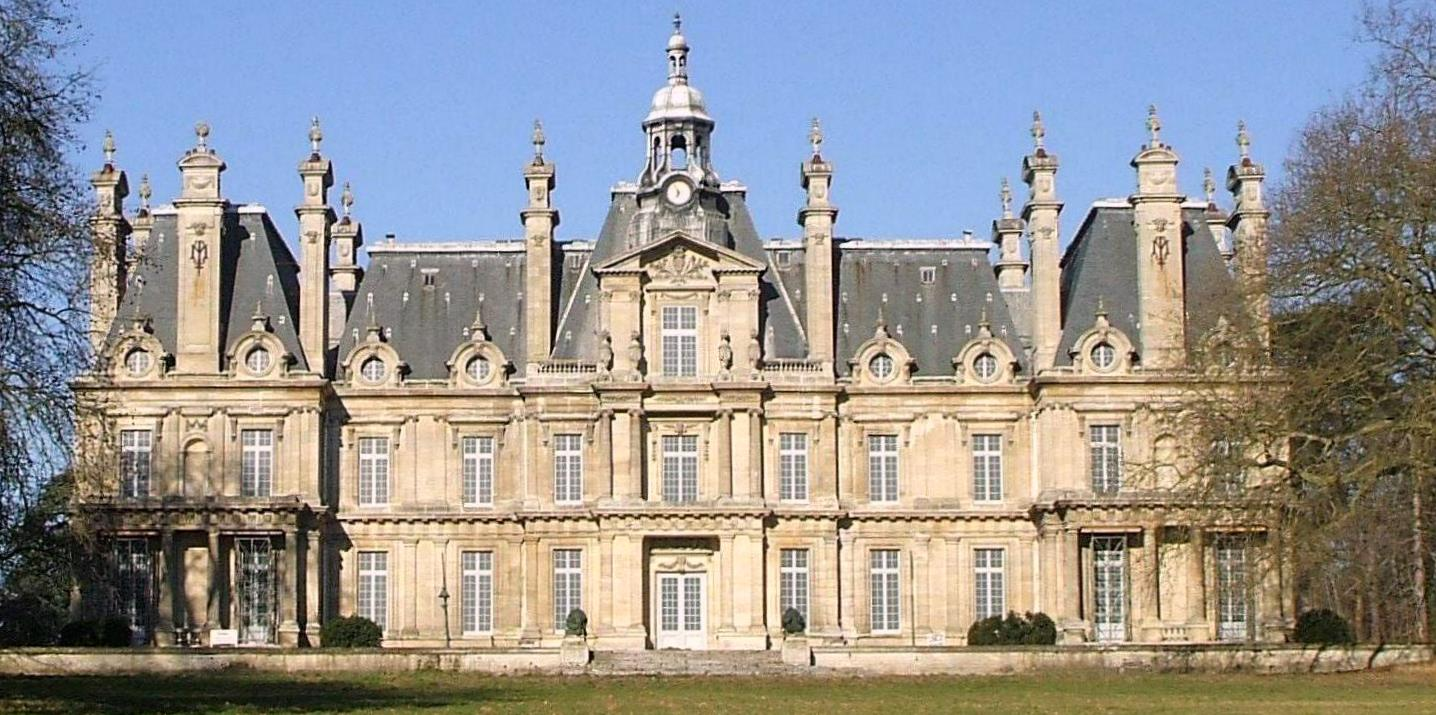
- Château de Franconvillle

- Coat of arms
- Location of Saint-Martin-du-Tertre
- Location within France Location within Île-de-France (region)
- Coordinates: 49°06′27″N 2°20′47″E
- Country: France
- Region: Île-de-France
- Department: Val-d'Oise
- Arrondissement: Sarcelles
- Canton: Fosses
- Intercommunality: Carnelle - Pays de France

Government
  - Mayor (2022–2026): Thierry Pichery
- Area^{1}: 13.23 km^{2} (5.11 sq mi)
- Population (2023): 2,689
  - Density: 203.3/km^{2} (526.4/sq mi)
- Time zone: UTC+01:00 (CET)
  - Summer (DST): UTC+02:00 (CEST)
- INSEE/Postal code: 95566 /95270
- ^{1} French Land Register data, which excludes lakes, ponds, glaciers > 1 km^{2} (0.386 sq mi or 247 acres) and river estuaries.

Saint-Martin-du-Tertre (French pronunciation: [sɛ̃ maʁtɛ̃ dy tɛʁtʁ]) is a commune in the Val-d'Oise department in Île-de-France in northern France. It was first attested in 1170 as "Sanctus Martinus de Colle".

== Château de Franconville ==
Between 1876 and 1882, André Philippe Alfred Régnier (1837–1913), 3rd Duke of Massa, had the Château de Franconville (rue Corentin Celton ) built under the direction of architect Gabriel-Hippolyte Destailleur. The Maisons-Laffitte castle served as a model. It was converted into a sanatorium in 1929.

== Population ==
Historical population
Year	Pop.	±% p.a.
1968	1,286	—
1975	1,414	+1.36%
1982	2,436	+8.08%
1990	2,359	−0.40%
1999	2,346	−0.06%
2007	2,381	+0.19%
2012	2,668	+2.30%
2017	2,778	+0.81%
2023	2,689	−0.54%
Source: INSEE

== See also ==
- Communes of the Val-d'Oise department
