= Épinay–Villetaneuse station =

French railway station

Épinay–Villetaneuse
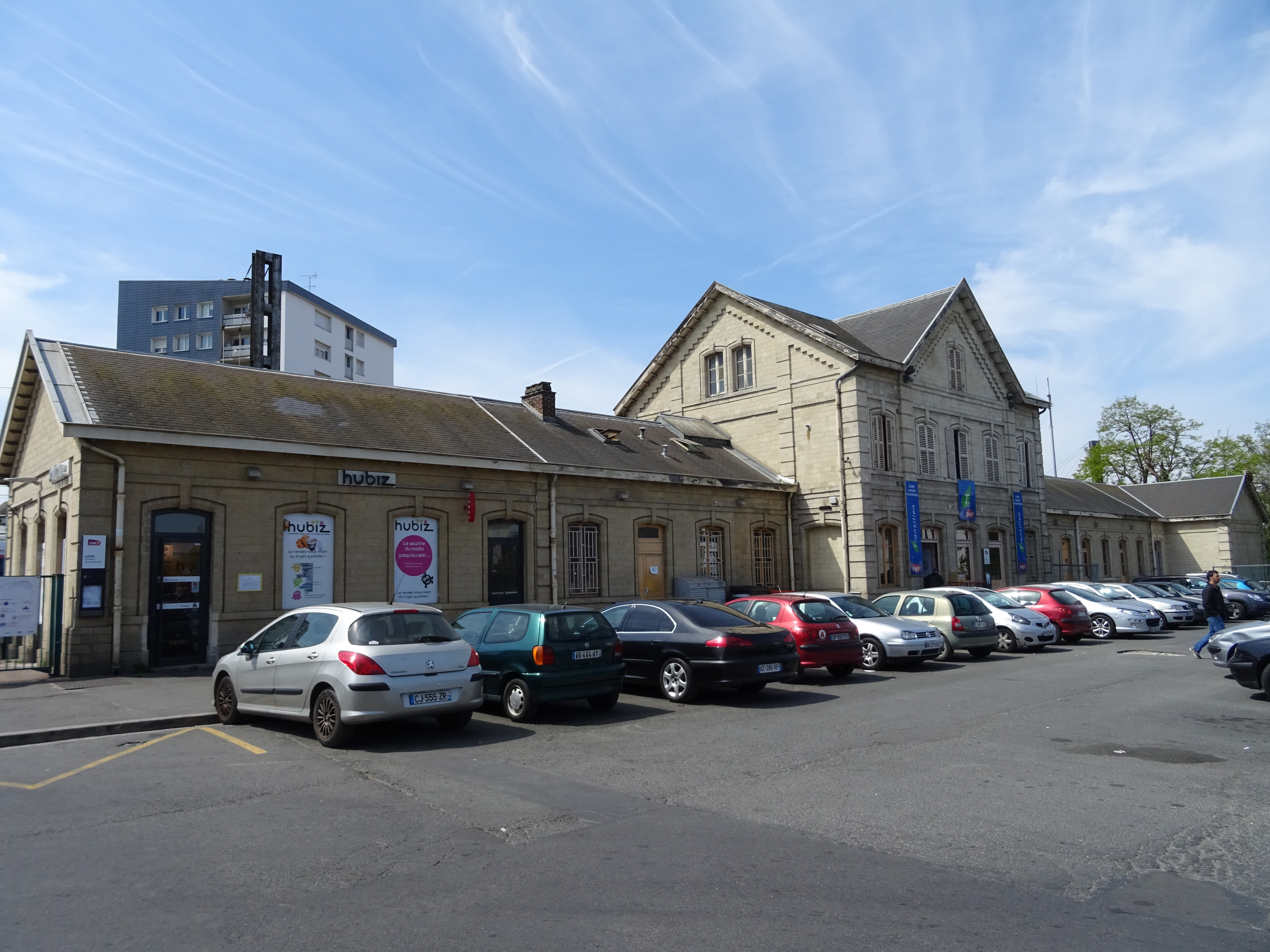

General information
- Location: Route de Saint Leu; Épinay-sur-Seine; Rue des Presles; Deuil-la-Barre; France
- Coordinates: 48.95828°N 2.32827°E
- Owner: SNCF
- Operator: SNCF & Transkeo
- Line: Line H
- Platforms: 5
- Tracks: 6

Other information
- Station code: 87271122 / 87697300
- Fare zone: 3

History
- Opened: 1880

Passengers
- 2024: 17,439,318

Services
Preceding station	Transilien	Following station
Saint-Denis towards Paris-Nord	Line H	La Barre Ormesson towards Pontoise or Persan–Beaumont
Saint-Denis towards Paris-Nord	Line H	Deuil–Montmagny towards Persan–Beaumont or Luzarches
Preceding station	Tram	Following station
Épinay-sur-Seine Terminus	T11	Villetaneuse–Université towards Le Bourget
Location

Épinay - Villetaneuse is a railway station located in the commune of Épinay-sur-Seine, Seine-Saint-Denis department, France. It is also adjacent to the communes of Montmagny and Deuil-la-Barre in Val d'Oise.

Despite its name, the Gare d'Épinay-Villetaneuse is located approximately 1 km from Villetaneuse. Nonetheless, it is the closest station on the H line to the Paris 13 University campus in Villetaneuse.

The station is at the junction of two lines:

- Paris - Persan - Beauvais - Le Tréport-Mers
- Paris - Ermont - Pontoise

It is at the 9.040 kilometre point on the Saint-Denis - Pontoise line, an older section of the Paris - Lille route which was superseded in 1859 by the more direct line from Saint-Denis to Creil. There was previously a military connection between this line and the Grande Ceinture line. The SA HLM SICF-La Sablière, a public housing subsidiary of the SNCF, has requisitioned the land and built housing blocks. In 2000, the number of passengers per day was between 7,500 and 15,000. The station has two free carparks with 100 and 177 spaces.

== History ==
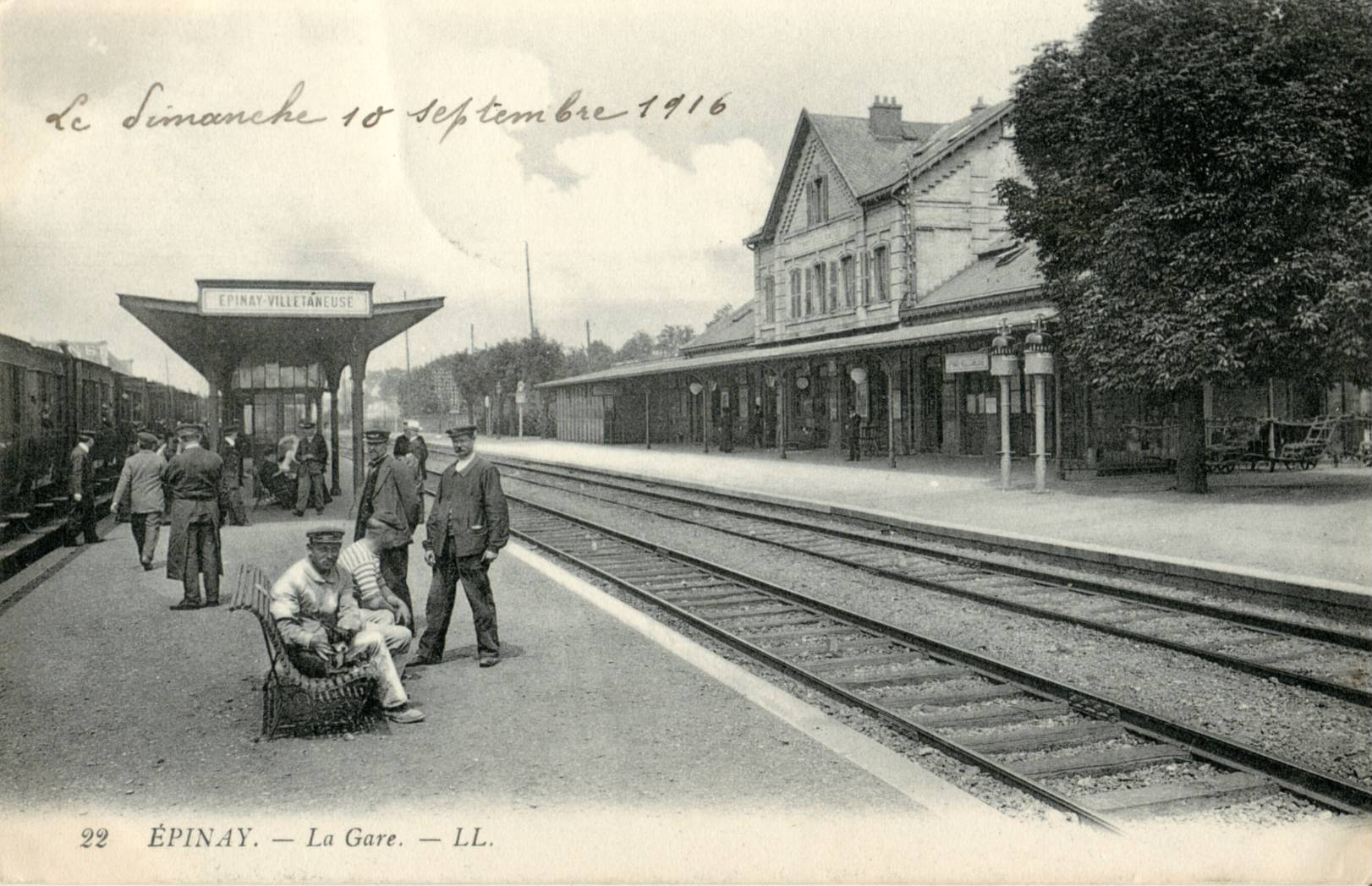
1916 view of the station platforms, now the Transilien station

Although the stop appears to have been created in 1850, the station was constructed only in 1880, as the Gare d'Épinay, by the Chemins de fer du Nord with appropriate architecture for a junction station, as at Eu. It was renamed Gare d'Épinay-Villetaneuse in 1908 when the new Gare d'Épinay-sur-Seine was built on what was then called the Les Grésillons line (now incorporated into the North Branch of the RER C).

The Nord Company opened the line between Épinay and Persan-Beaumont via Montsoult in 1877 and the Montsoult - Luzarches branch in 1880.

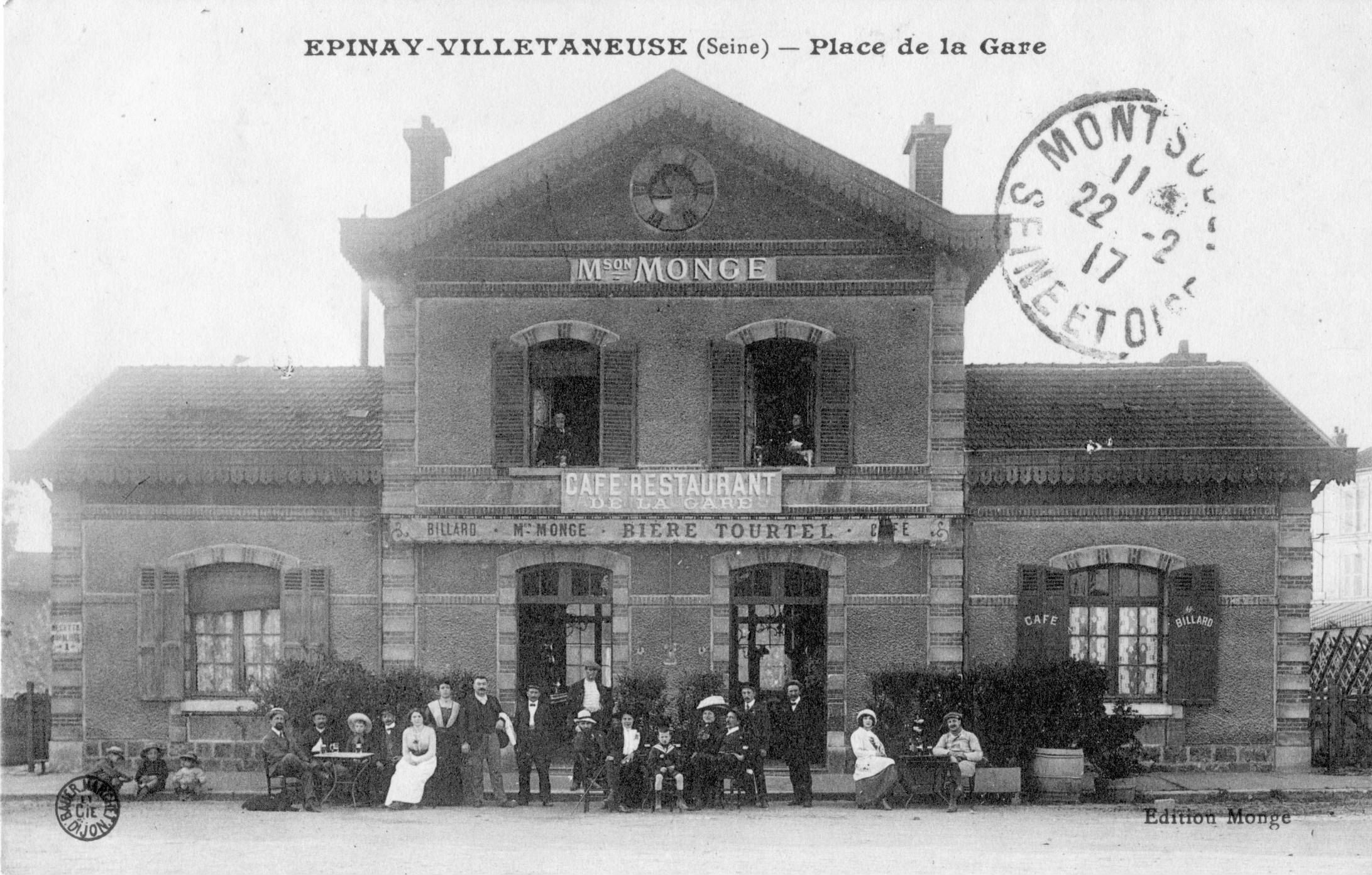
Former Grande Ceinture line station, in use as the Café-Restaurant de la Gare, in a postcard sent in 1917

The Grande Ceinture line had its own station in the same location as that of the Nord Company. This very soon fell into disuse, since it was occupied by the station café at the beginning of the 20th century, and it became completely unnecessary to the railway when passenger traffic on the Grande Ceinture was terminated in 1939. It was demolished in the 1990s.

== Today ==
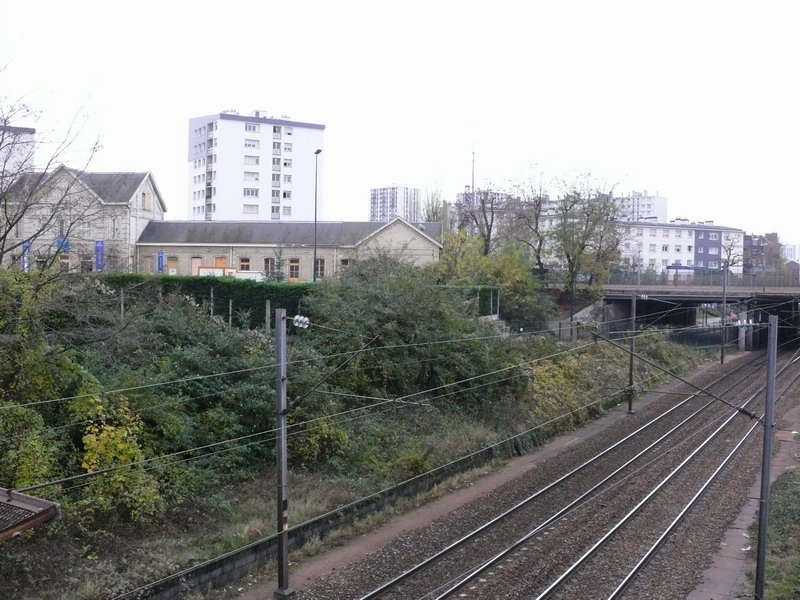
The Grande Ceinture line at Épinay — Villetaneuse

The Persan-Beaumont line and the Valmondois line separate immediately after the station building. The station is served by Transilien trains on the H line.

In approximately 2014, the station is to be connected to the North Tangent.
