= Groslay =

- Commune
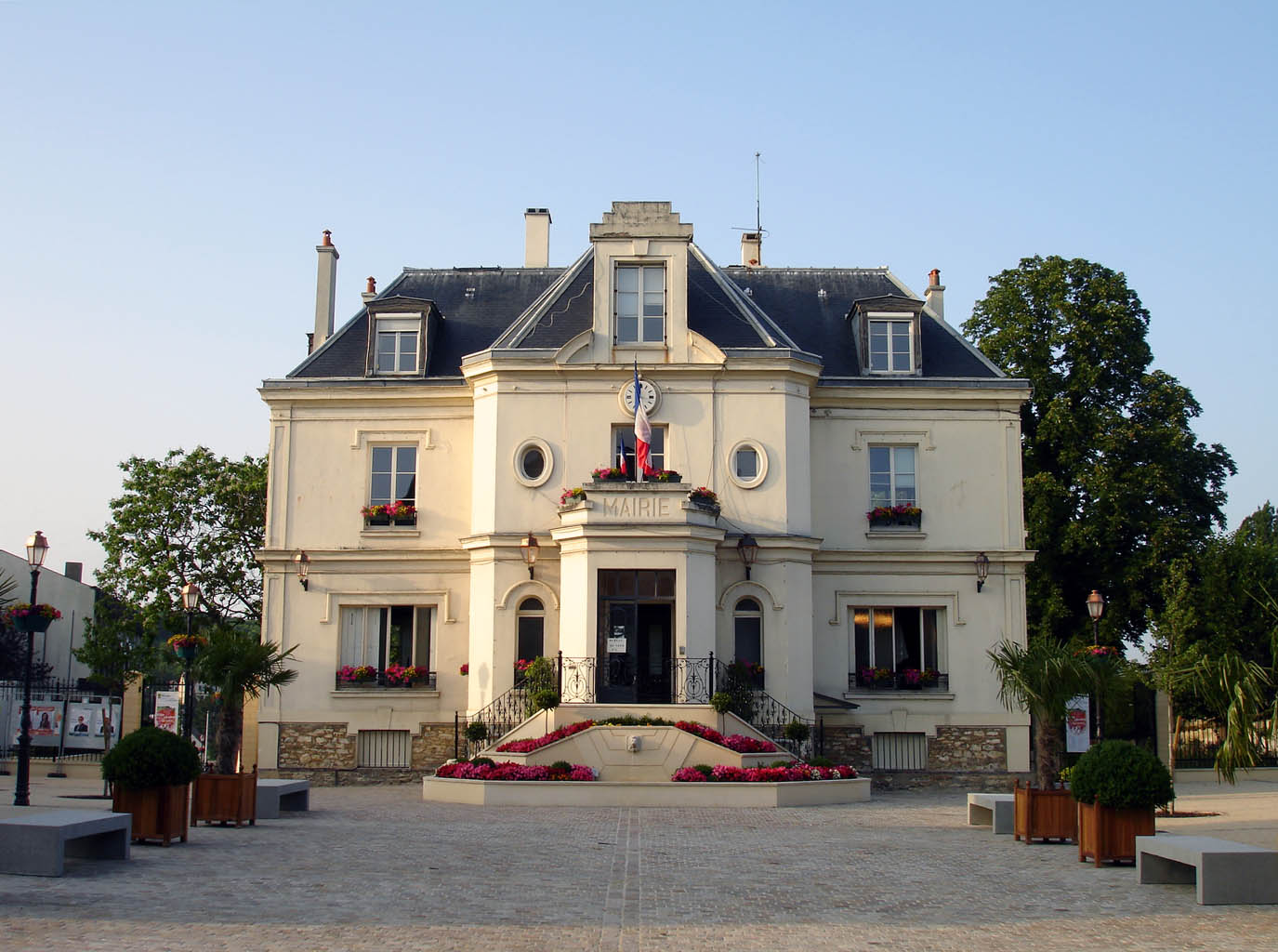
- Town hall

- Coat of arms
- Location of Groslay
- Location within France Location within Île-de-France (region)
- Coordinates: 48°59′15″N 2°20′43″E
- Country: France
- Region: Île-de-France
- Department: Val-d'Oise
- Arrondissement: Sarcelles
- Canton: Deuil-la-Barre
- Intercommunality: CA Plaine Vallée

Government
  - Mayor (2020–2026): Patrick Cancouët
- Area^{1}: 2.95 km^{2} (1.14 sq mi)
- Population (2023): 8,453
  - Density: 2,870/km^{2} (7,420/sq mi)
- Time zone: UTC+01:00 (CET)
  - Summer (DST): UTC+02:00 (CEST)
- INSEE/Postal code: 95288 /95410
- ^{1} French Land Register data, which excludes lakes, ponds, glaciers > 1 km^{2} (0.386 sq mi or 247 acres) and river estuaries.

Groslay (French pronunciation: [ɡʁolɛ]) is a commune in the Val-d'Oise department in Île-de-France in northern France. It is located 15 km north of Paris, the capital.

== Boundaries ==
The commune is bounded with Montmorency, Saint-Brice-sous-Forêt, Sarcelles, Deuil-la-Barre and Montmagny.

== History ==
Historical population

Year	Pop.	±% p.a.
1793	1,039	—
1800	1,009	−0.42%
1806	1,076	+1.08%
1821	1,063	−0.08%
1831	1,195	+1.18%
1836	1,170	−0.42%
1841	1,047	−2.20%
1846	1,074	+0.51%
1851	1,044	−0.57%
1856	1,039	−0.10%
1861	1,024	−0.29%
1866	1,072	+0.92%
1872	1,030	−0.66%
1876	1,107	+1.82%
1881	1,115	+0.14%
1886	1,189	+1.29%
1891	1,233	+0.73%
1896	1,448	+3.27%
1901	1,528	+1.08%

Year	Pop.	±% p.a.
1906	1,695	+2.10%
1911	2,014	+3.51%
1921	2,527	+2.30%
1926	3,056	+3.87%
1931	4,001	+5.54%
1936	3,639	−1.88%
1946	3,617	−0.06%
1954	4,138	+1.70%
1962	2,953	−4.13%
1968	3,820	+4.38%
1975	5,600	+5.62%
1982	5,400	−0.52%
1990	6,138	+1.61%
1999	7,006	+1.48%
2007	8,075	+1.79%
2012	8,676	+1.45%
2017	8,778	+0.23%
2023	8,453	−0.63%

Source: Cassini and INSEE

The name comes from Graua, a Gaulish word, that means "terrain with pebbles". The nature of the soil was particularly favorable for wine growing, which was exploited here from antiquity until the late 19th century phylloxera epidemic.

The name was first mentioned in an act of donations from the Abbey of Saint-Denis in 862. The first master of Groslay was Odon or Éudes of Groslay in the late 11th century. In the 13th century, the village became a fief of the House of Montmorency, in the 17th century of the House of Condé.

The commune was essentially about wine which was produced until the early 20th century. Groslay has seen similar developments as neighbouring Montmorency: construction of country houses in the 18th century, middle class houses in the 19th century, and garden city urbanization in the 20th century.

Groslay hasn't been subjected to large scale urbanization in the 1960s and the 1970s unlike many of its neighbours. The municipal park and the square in front of the town hall were completely renovated in 2007.

== Administration ==
Groslay falls under the jurisdiction of the civil court of Montmorency, and the business court of Pontoise.

=== Mayors ===
- 1925 - 1935: Ludovic Benasson (aka Ludovic Benasson-Marignac)
- 1953 - 1965: André Maury
- March 2001 - 2020: Joël Boutier

=== Security ===
The crime rate in Deuil-la-Barre including Montmagny and Groslay was 81.11 per 10,000 people in 2005 and was slightly lower than the national level (83/1000) and the department level (88.15/1000).

== Transportation ==
Groslay is served with its station with Transilien Paris-Nord, a branch of Paris-Nord Persan- Beaumont/Luzarches. The station also serves with a train every 15 minutes. It is served every 30 minutes during the weekend (around 8:30 PM). Around 15 to 17 minutes heads to a part of Nord station.

The commune is served at line 95.02 with the CIF (Montmorency-Charles de Gaulle International Airport).

== See also ==
- Communes of the Val-d'Oise department

== Bibliography ==
- François Collin, Groslay à bâtons rompus, Valhermeil publishers, 2006, 143 pages.
