= Saint-Brice-sous-Forêt =

- Commune
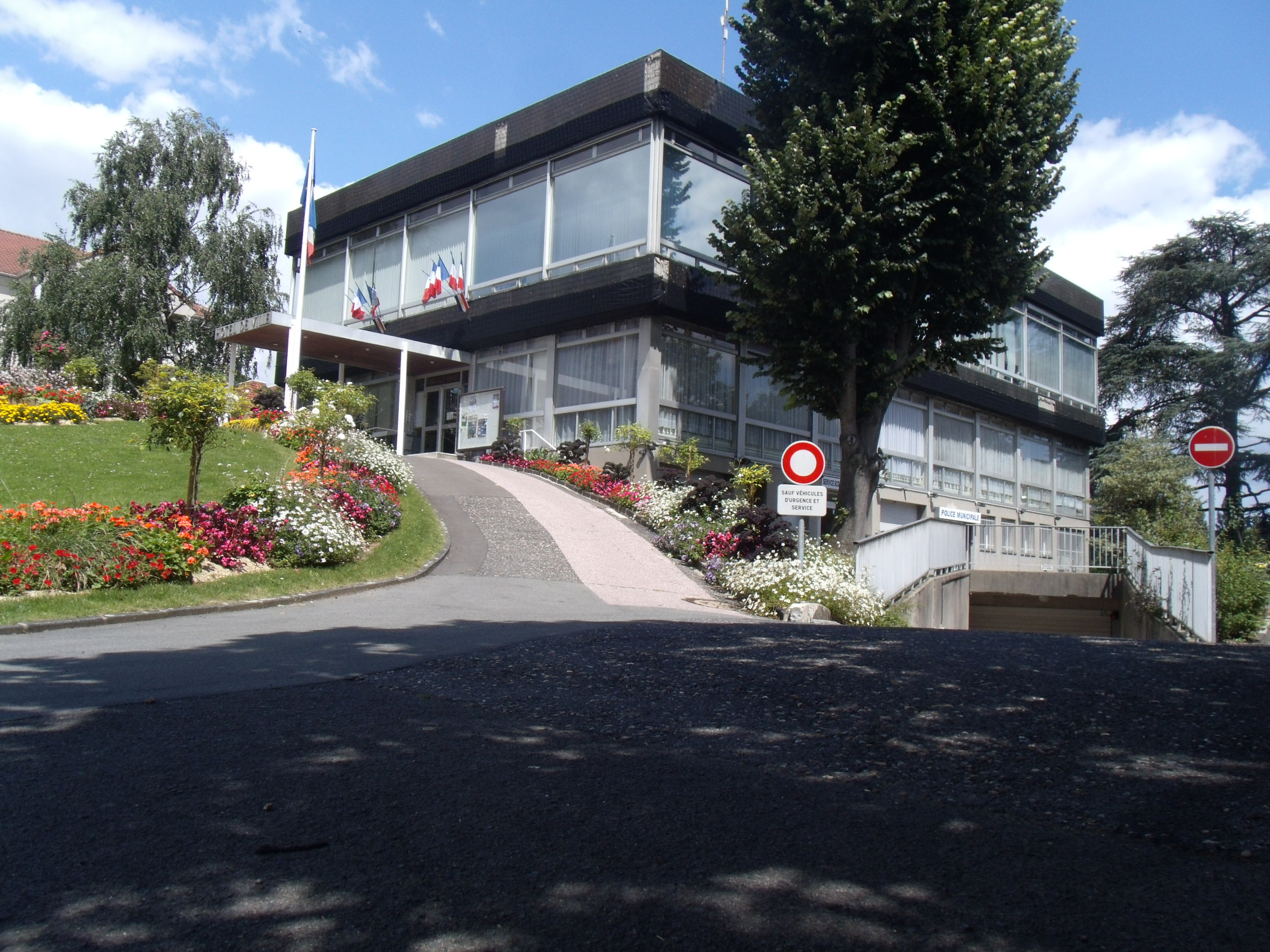
- Town hall

- Coat of arms
- Location of Saint-Brice-sous-Forêt
- Location within France Location within Île-de-France (region)
- Coordinates: 48°59′57″N 2°21′28″E
- Country: France
- Region: Île-de-France
- Department: Val-d'Oise
- Arrondissement: Sarcelles
- Canton: Deuil-la-Barre
- Intercommunality: CA Plaine Vallée

Government
  - Mayor (2023–2026): Virginie Prehoubert
- Area^{1}: 6.00 km^{2} (2.32 sq mi)
- Highest elevation: 140 m (460 ft)
- Lowest elevation: 60 m (200 ft)
- Population (2023): 15,063
  - Density: 2,510/km^{2} (6,500/sq mi)
- Time zone: UTC+01:00 (CET)
  - Summer (DST): UTC+02:00 (CEST)
- INSEE/Postal code: 95539 /95350
- ^{1} French Land Register data, which excludes lakes, ponds, glaciers > 1 km^{2} (0.386 sq mi or 247 acres) and river estuaries.

Saint-Brice-sous-Forêt (French pronunciation: [sɛ̃ bʁis su fɔʁɛ]) is a commune in the Val-d'Oise department in Île-de-France in northern France. Sarcelles–Saint-Brice station has rail connections to Persan, Luzarches and Paris.

== Population ==
Historical population
Year	Pop.	±% p.a.
1968	4,804	—
1975	7,491	+6.55%
1982	9,528	+3.50%
1990	11,662	+2.56%
1999	12,540	+0.81%
2007	13,914	+1.31%
2012	14,333	+0.60%
2017	14,883	+0.76%
2023	15,063	+0.20%
Source: INSEE

== Education ==
In the commune there are four preschools/nurseries, four elementary schools, and one junior high school with a total of about 1,500 students as of 2016.

Primary schools:

- Preschools/nurseries: Jean Charron, Alphonse Daudet, Charles Perrault (includes buildings A and B), and Léon Rouvrais
- Elementary schools: Pierre et Marie Curie, Jules Ferry, Jean de la Fontaine, and Antoine de Saint-Exupéry

Collège de Nézant is the junior high school in the commune. There are two senior high schools/sixth-form colleges in surrounding areas: Lycée Camille Saint-Saëns in Deuil-la-Barre and Lycée Jean-Jacques Rousseau in Montmorency.

== Famous residents ==
- The surrealist Paul Éluard lived in Saint-Brice-sous-Forêt, and invited several future surrealists to his home including Max Ernst, André Breton and Robert Desnos.
- American author Edith Wharton lived in Saint-Brice-sous-Forêt from 1919 until her death in 1937. The road she lived on has since been named after her.

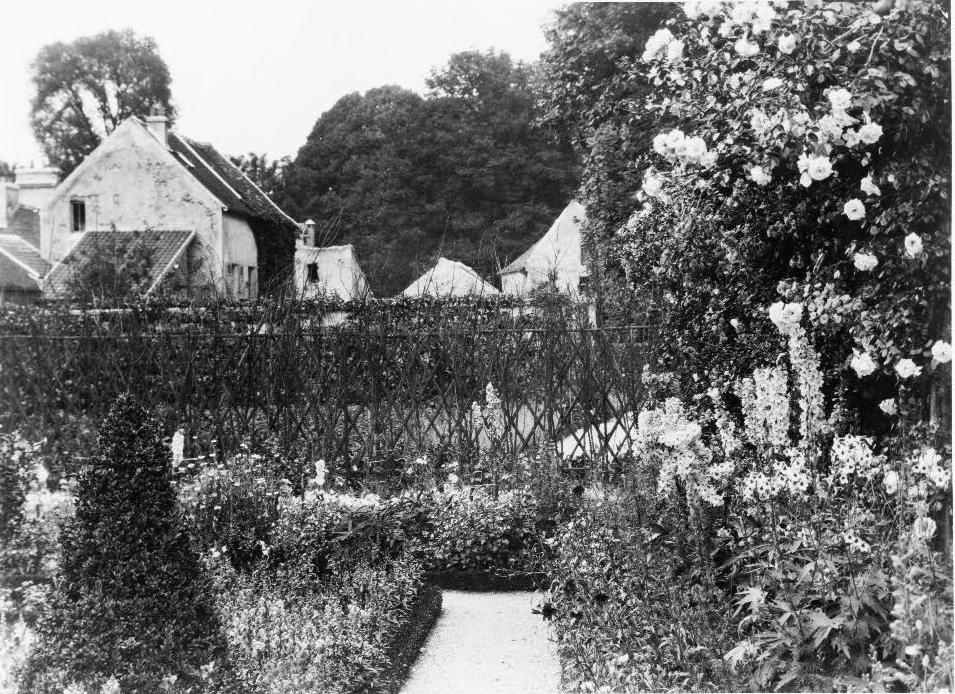
Gardens of the Pavilion Colombe, Edith Wharton's villa

== Nearby cities ==
The commune is bordered on the north by Piscop, which is administratively managed by Saint-Brice-sous-Forêt, on the east by Sarcelles, on the south by Groslay, and on the west by Montmorency.

== See also ==
- Communes of the Val-d'Oise department
