= Épinay-sur-Seine station =

French railway station

Épinay-sur-Seine
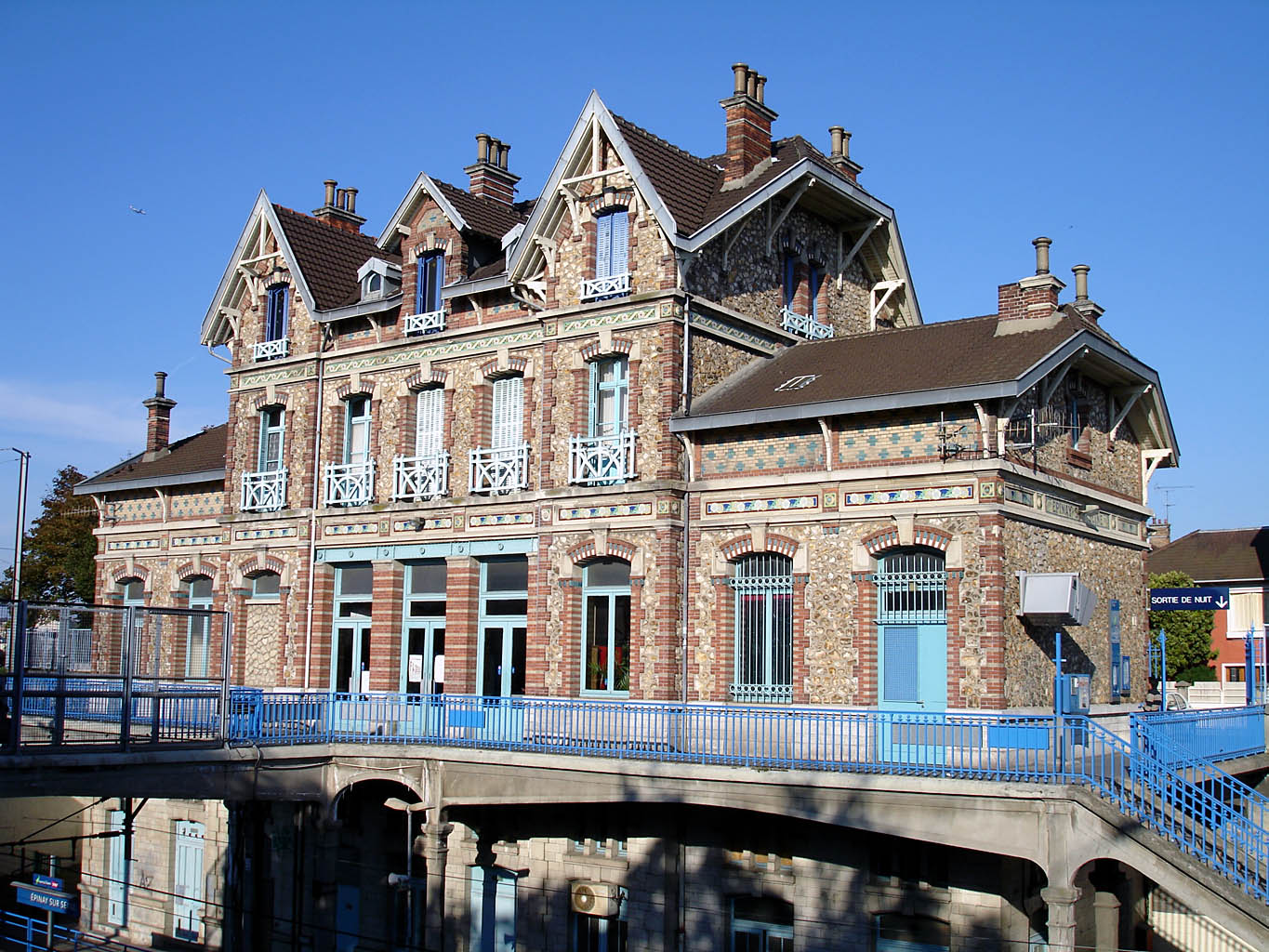
- The Gare d'Épinay-sur-Seine is highly ornamented, like all the stations on the former Les Grésillons line.

General information
- Location: Place de la Nouvelle gare 93800 Épinay-sur-Seine, France
- Coordinates: 48.9542128°N 2.3022795°E
- Owner: SNCF; Transkeo
- Lines: RER RER C Tramways in Île-de-France Île-de-France tramway Line 11
- Platforms: 2 outside / 2
- Tracks: 2 / 2

Other information
- Station code: 87271148 / 87697292
- Fare zone: 3

History
- Opened: 1 July 1908; 25 September 1988; 1 July 2017

Passengers
- 2024: 6,744,736
Location

Épinay-sur-Seine (French: Gare d'Épinay-sur-Seine) is one of the two railway stations in the commune of Épinay-sur-Seine, Seine-Saint-Denis department, France (the other being the Gare d'Épinay-Villetaneuse). The station opened in 1908 on what was then called the Les Grésillons line, which in 1988 was incorporated into the North Branch of the RER C as part of the Vallée de Montmorency - Les Invalides connection project.

== The station ==
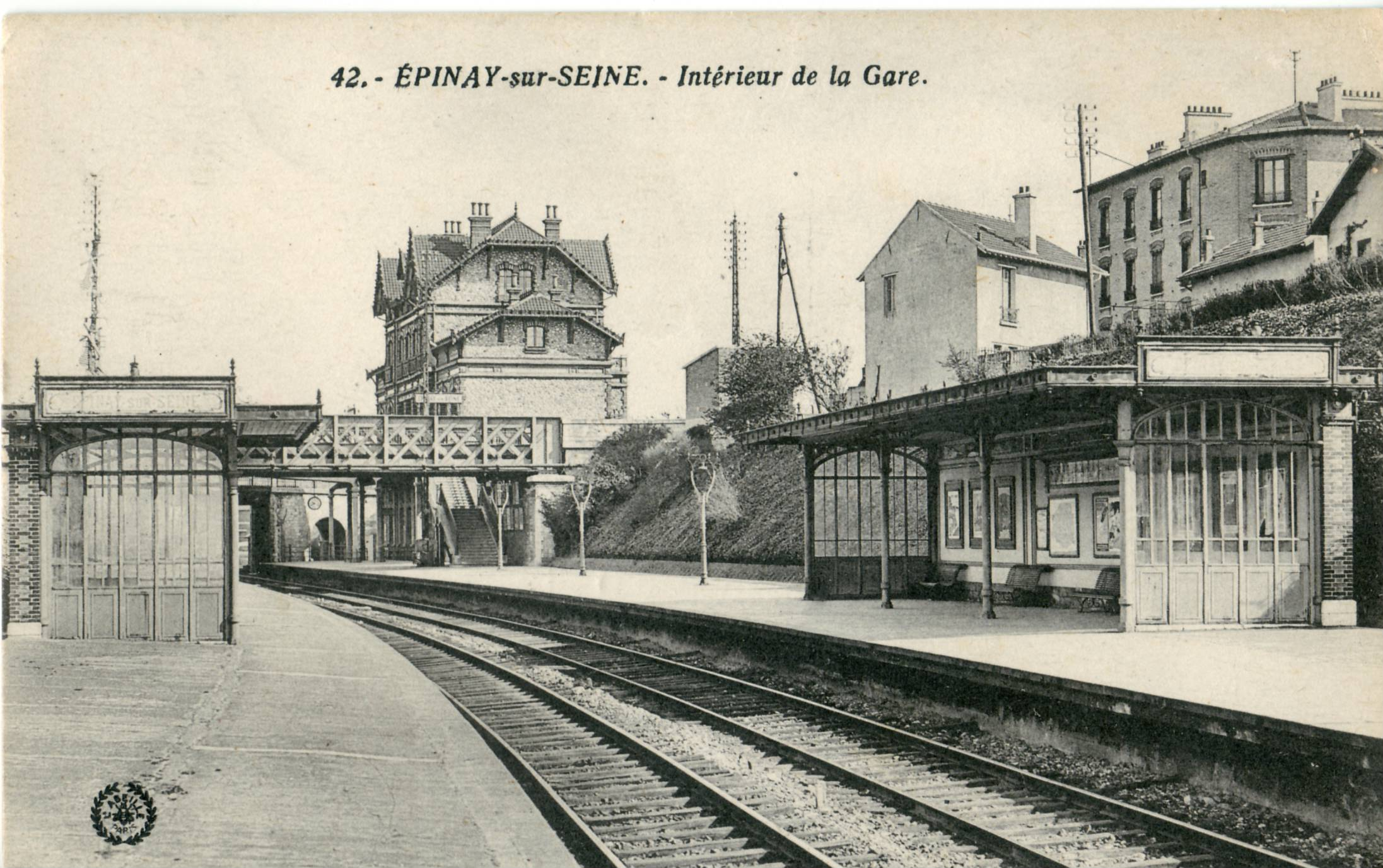
View of the station in the early 20th century; rear bridge carries Grande Ceinture line

The station was built by the Nord company in 1908 as part of the opening of the Les Grésillons line (also known as the Docks line). It was designed by Clément Ligny in a regional style which combines decorative elements such as Montmorency marl, glazed brick, cut stone, ceramic friezes, and wrought iron.

The unusual vertical arrangement of the station is due to its formerly having been a transfer point to the Grande Ceinture line, which had a stop there called the Grand Sentier. The Grande Ceinture crosses over the RER line passing next to one gable of the station.

The station is served by trains on Branch C1 of the RER C.

The station is set to become a significant interchange. In 2014, a stop on Île-de-France tramway Line 8 opened. In the future, the station is to be served also by the Tram Express Nord, on the former Grande Ceinture line.

In 2004, the number of passengers per day was between 2,500 and 7,500.

Preceding station	RER	Following station
Saint-Gratien towards Pontoise	RER C	Gennevilliers towards Massy-Palaiseau or Dourdan-la-Forêt
Preceding station	Tram	Following station
Terminus	T11	Épinay–Villetaneuse towards Le Bourget
