= Groslay station =

French rail station

Groslay
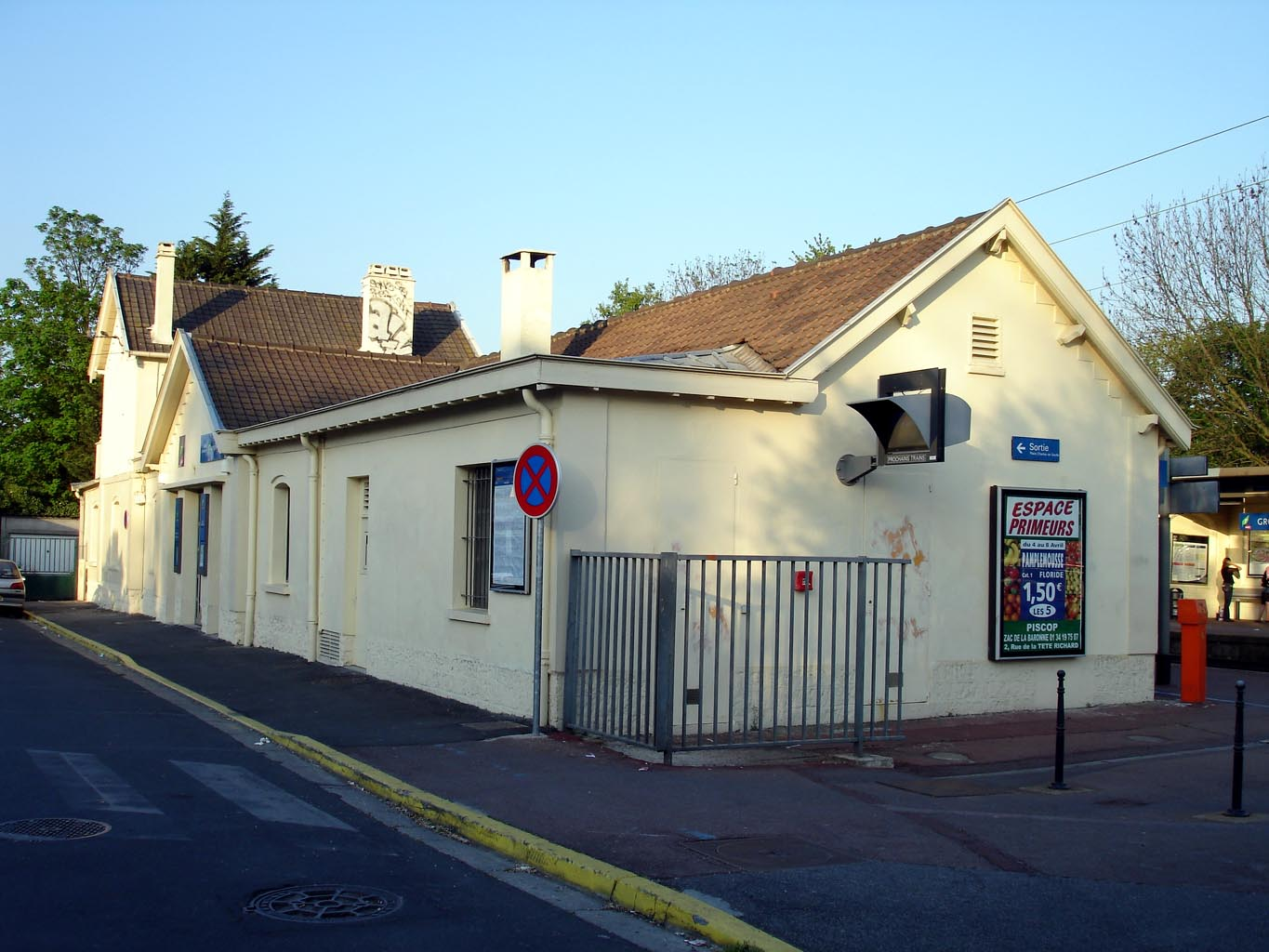
- The station

General information
- Location: Groslay, France
- Coordinates: 48.9846°N 2.3536°E
- Owner: SNCF
- Line: Épinay-Villetaneuse–Le Tréport-Mers railway
- Tracks: 2

Construction
- Parking: 174 spaces

Other information
- Station code: 87276360
- Fare zone: 4 (Orange Card)

History
- Opened: 1877

Passengers
- 2024: 1,655,663

Services
Preceding station	Transilien	Following station
Deuil–Montmagny towards Paris-Nord	Line H	Sarcelles–Saint-Brice towards Persan–Beaumont or Luzarches
Location

Groslay station is a rail station located in Groslay, France. It is on the Épinay-Villetaneuse–Le Tréport-Mers railway. The station is used by Transilien line H trains from Paris to Persan-Beaumont and Luzarches. The annual number of passengers was 1,655,663 in 2024.

The line from Épinay to Persan-Beaumont via Montsoult was opened by the Compagnie des chemins de fer du Nord (Nord Railway Company) in 1877.

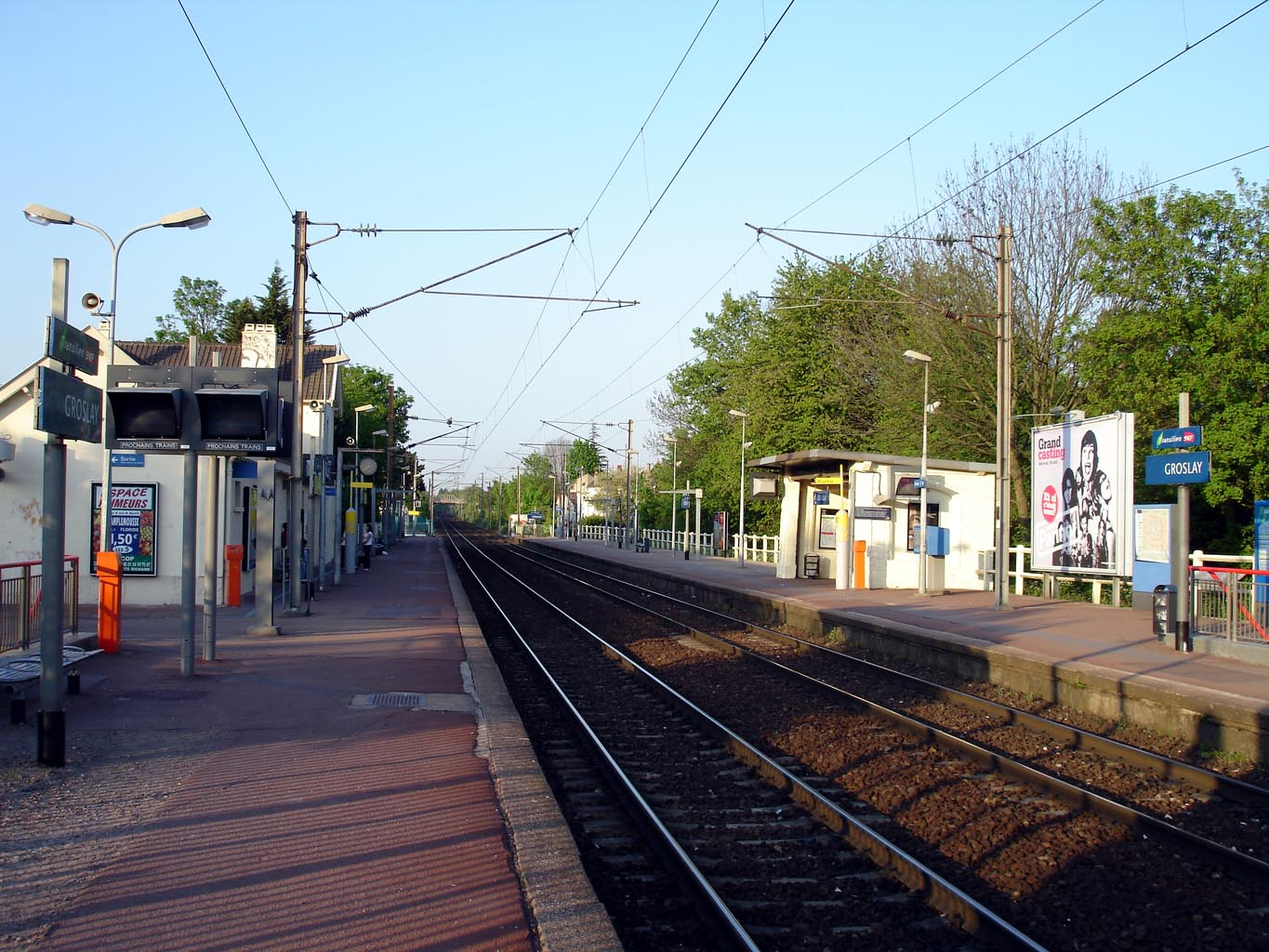
The platform

The station is accessed from Rue Charles de Gaulle. It has a taxi rank and a station car park with 174 parking spaces.

== Correspondances ==
- Busval d'Oise: 95.02
