= Communauté d'agglomération Plaine Vallée =

Coordinates: 48.99°N 2.32°E

Plaine Vallée
- Communauté d'agglomération
- Country: France
- Region: Île-de-France
- Department: Val-d'Oise
- No. of communes: {{{nbcomm}}}
- Established: 2016
- Area: 74.1 km^{2} (28.6 sq mi)
- Population (2021): 184,945
  - Density: 2,500/km^{2} (6,460/sq mi)

Communauté d'agglomération Plaine Vallée is the communauté d'agglomération, an intercommunal structure, covering northwestern suburbs of Paris. It is located in the Val-d'Oise department, in the Île-de-France region, northern France. Established in November 2015, effective from January 2016, its seat is in Montmorency. Its area is 74.1 km,^{2} and its population was 184,945 in 2021.

== Composition ==
The communauté d'agglomération consists of the following 18 communes:

1. Andilly
2. Attainville
3. Bouffémont
4. Deuil-la-Barre
5. Domont
6. Enghien-les-Bains
7. Ézanville
8. Groslay
9. Margency
10. Moisselles
11. Montlignon
12. Montmagny
13. Montmorency
14. Piscop
15. Saint-Brice-sous-Forêt
16. Saint-Gratien
17. Saint-Prix
18. Soisy-sous-Montmorency
