= Enghien-les-Bains station =

French railway station

Enghien-les-Bains
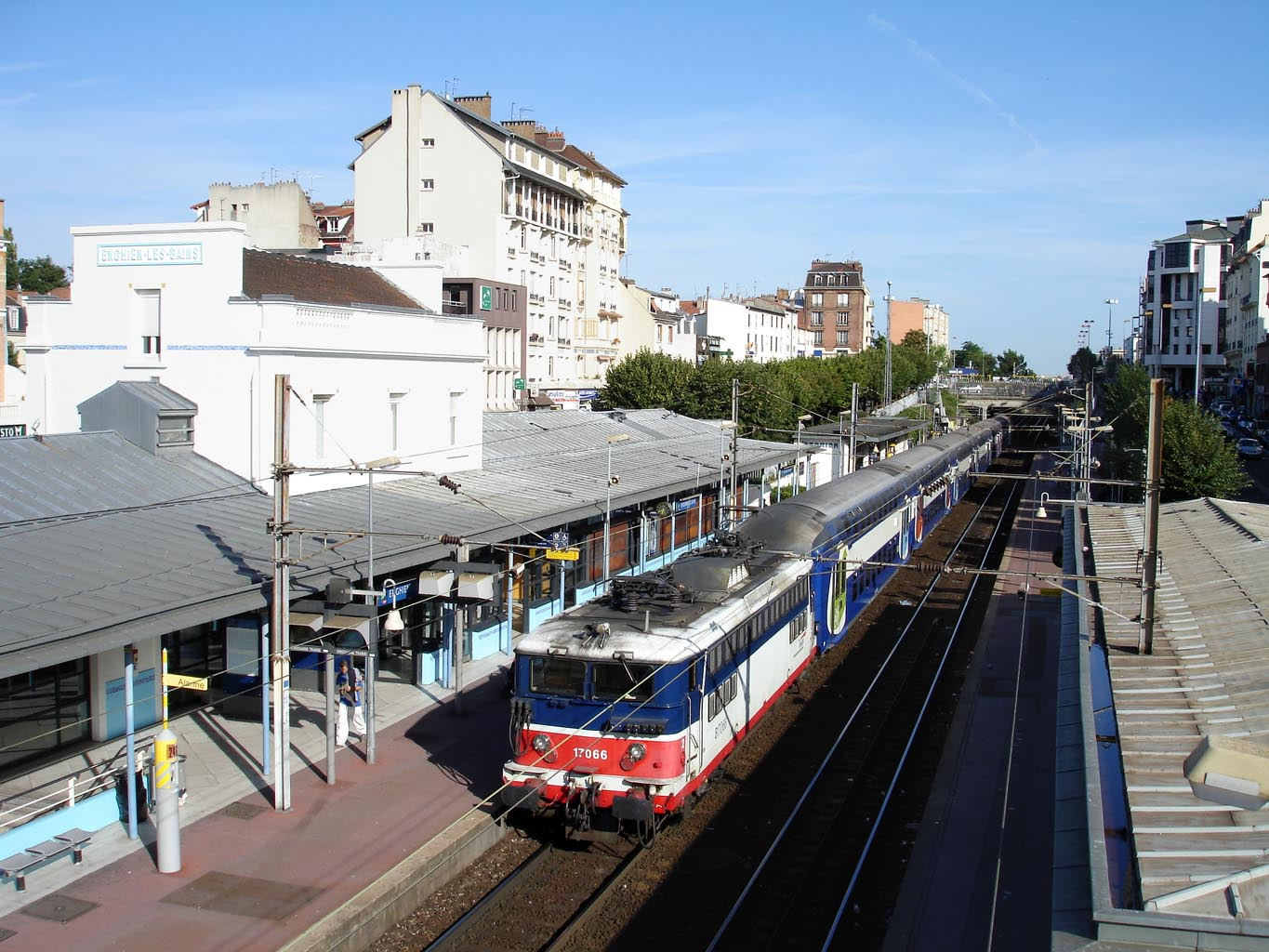

General information
- Location: Enghien-les-Bains, France
- Coordinates: 48°58′23″N 2°18′24″E
- Owner: SNCF
- Line: Saint-Denis–Dieppe railway
- Platforms: 2 platforms 2 walkways

Other information
- Station code: 87276022

History
- Opened: June 14, 1846

Passengers
- 2024: 7,716,567

Services
Preceding station	Transilien	Following station
La Barre - Ormesson towards Paris-Nord	Line H	Champ de courses d'Enghien towards Pontoise or Persan–Beaumont
Location

Enghien-les-Bains is a railway station in the commune of Enghien-les-Bains (Val-d'Oise department), France. The station is served by trains of the Transilien Paris Nord line H, from Paris to Pontoise and Persan-Beaumont. The daily number of passengers was between 7,500 and 15,000 in 2002.

== History ==
The station was opened on July 11, 1846, by the Compagnie du Nord. Trains from Paris to Lille and the Belgian border stopped at the station twice every hour. After the construction of a more direct line between Saint-Denis and Creil in 1859, the station is mainly used for local traffic. Between 1866 and 1954 the station was also the terminus of a branch line to Montmorency, known as the Refoulons. Until 1935, it was the terminus for tramway lines to Montmorency and to la Trinité in Paris, 9th arr.

Between April and May 1969, the line Paris-Pontoise was electrified and automatic signals were installed.

== Service ==
The station is served by 4 trains an hour (8 trains during peak hours) in both directions: Paris-Nord and Ermont-Eaubonne. It takes 9 to 15 minutes to reach Paris.

At the station, connection exists to the following bus services:

- RATP: 154 and 256
- R'Bus: 514
- Valmy: 11, 13, 14, 15A, 15M, Blue (Bleue), Red (Rouge), Green (Verte)
- Noctilien: N51

== Gallery ==
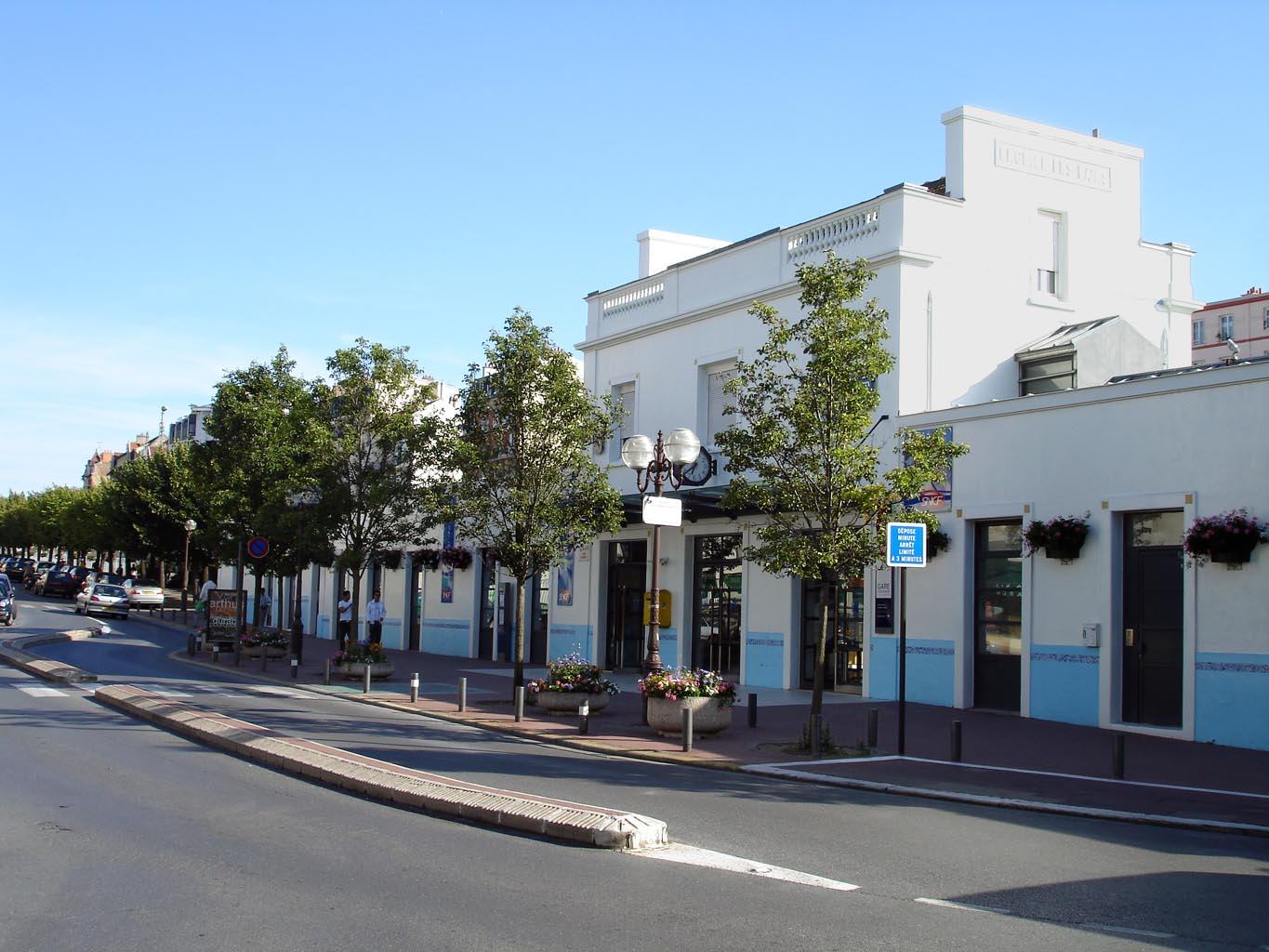
The front of the station

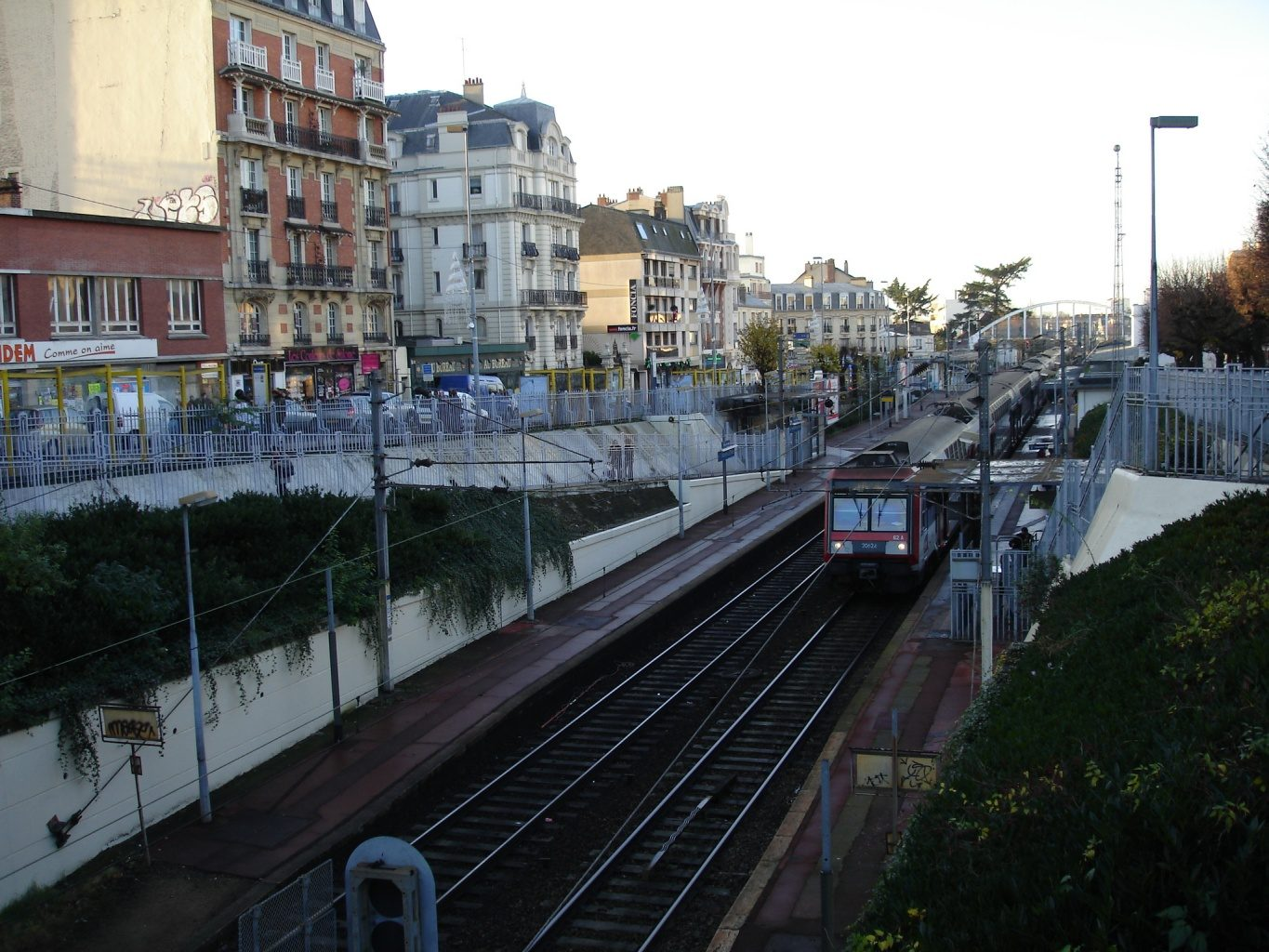
View of the station from pl. Foch

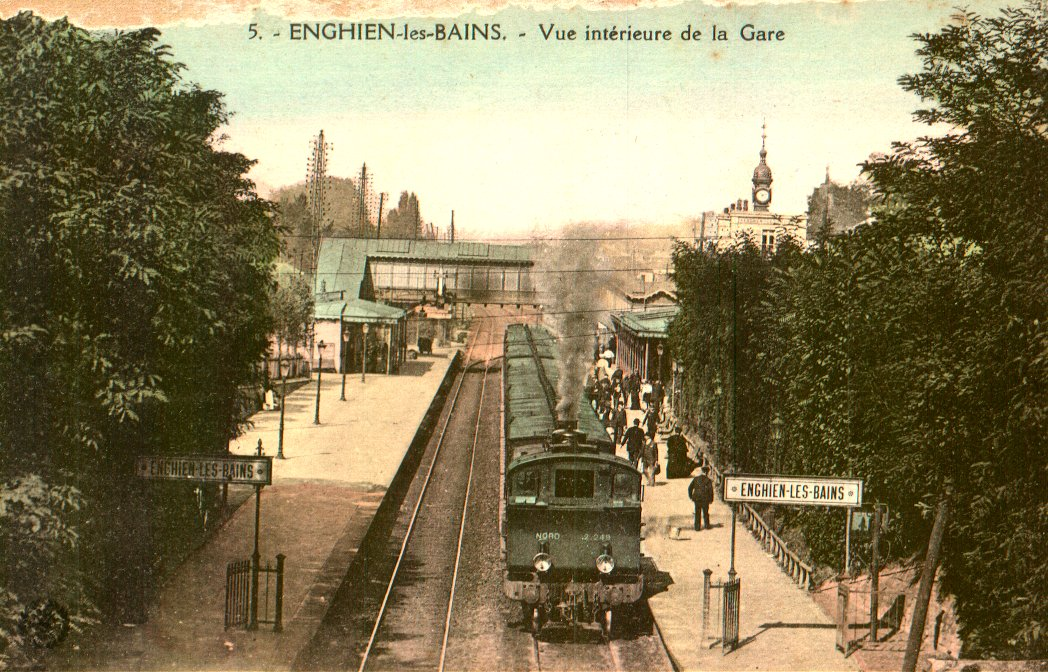
Gare d'Enghien-les-Bains in the early 20th century

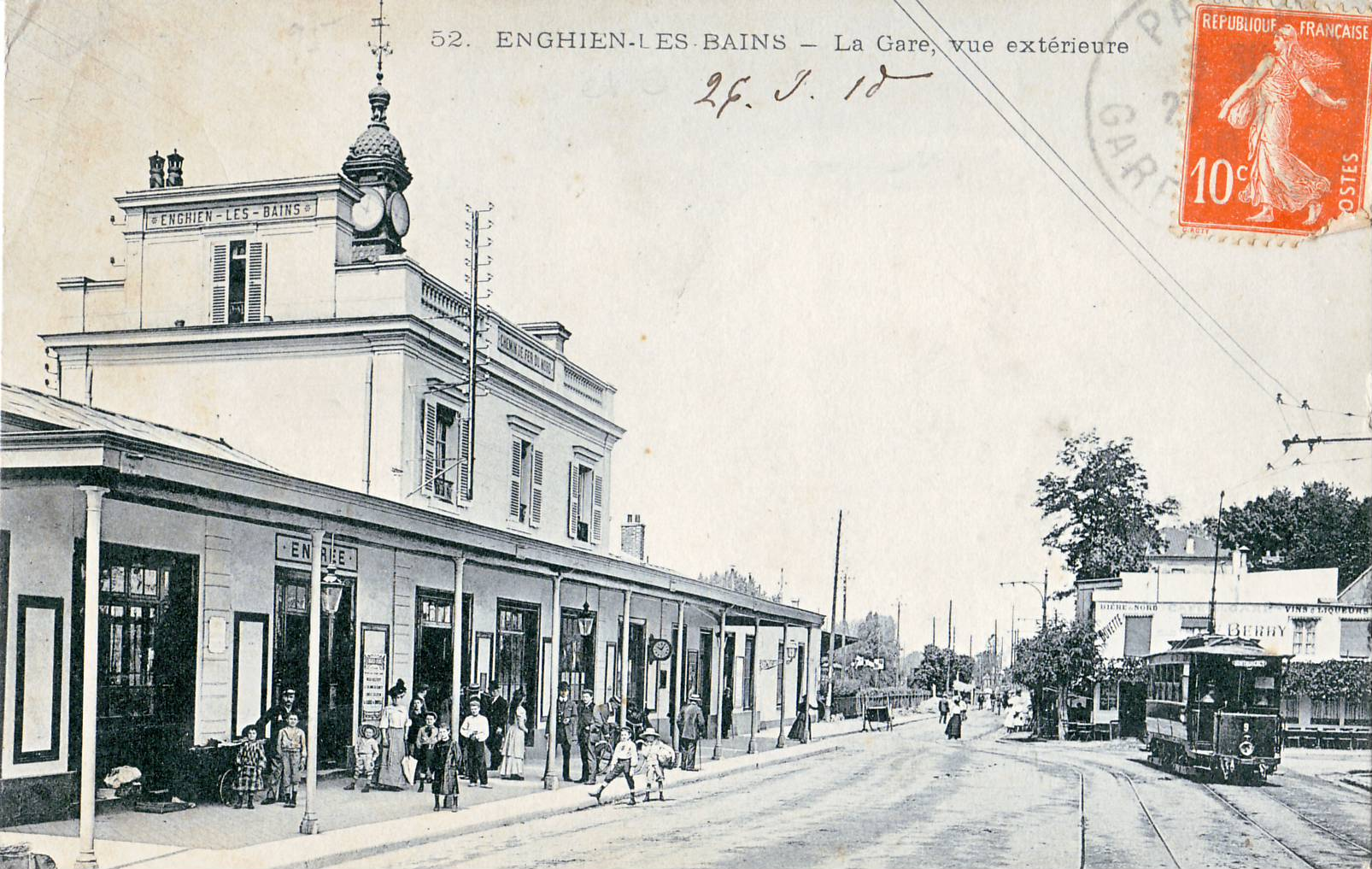
Gare d'Enghien-les-Bains, with a tram to la Trinité

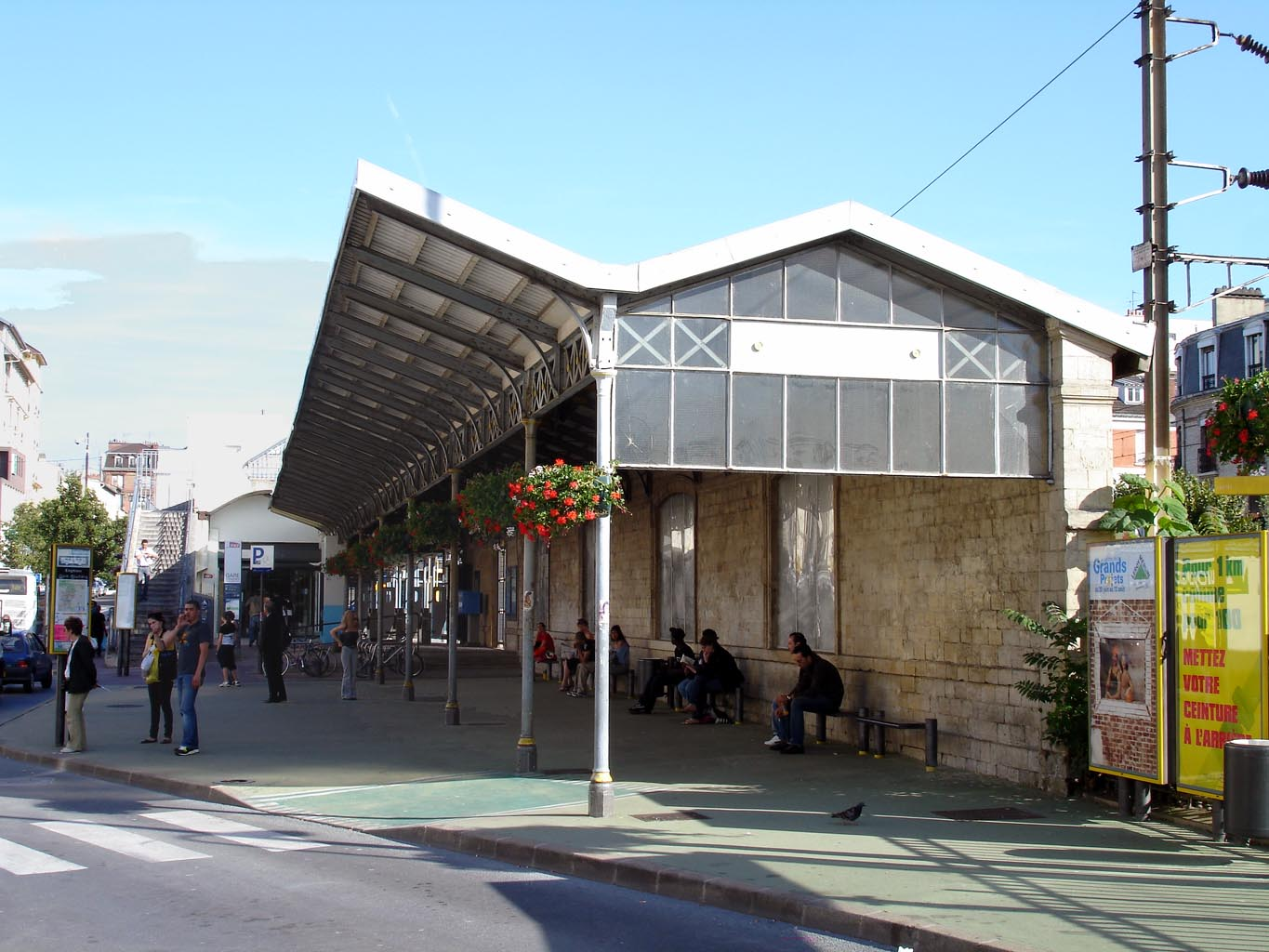
The former departure hall of the Refoulons line to Montmorency, now a bus station.

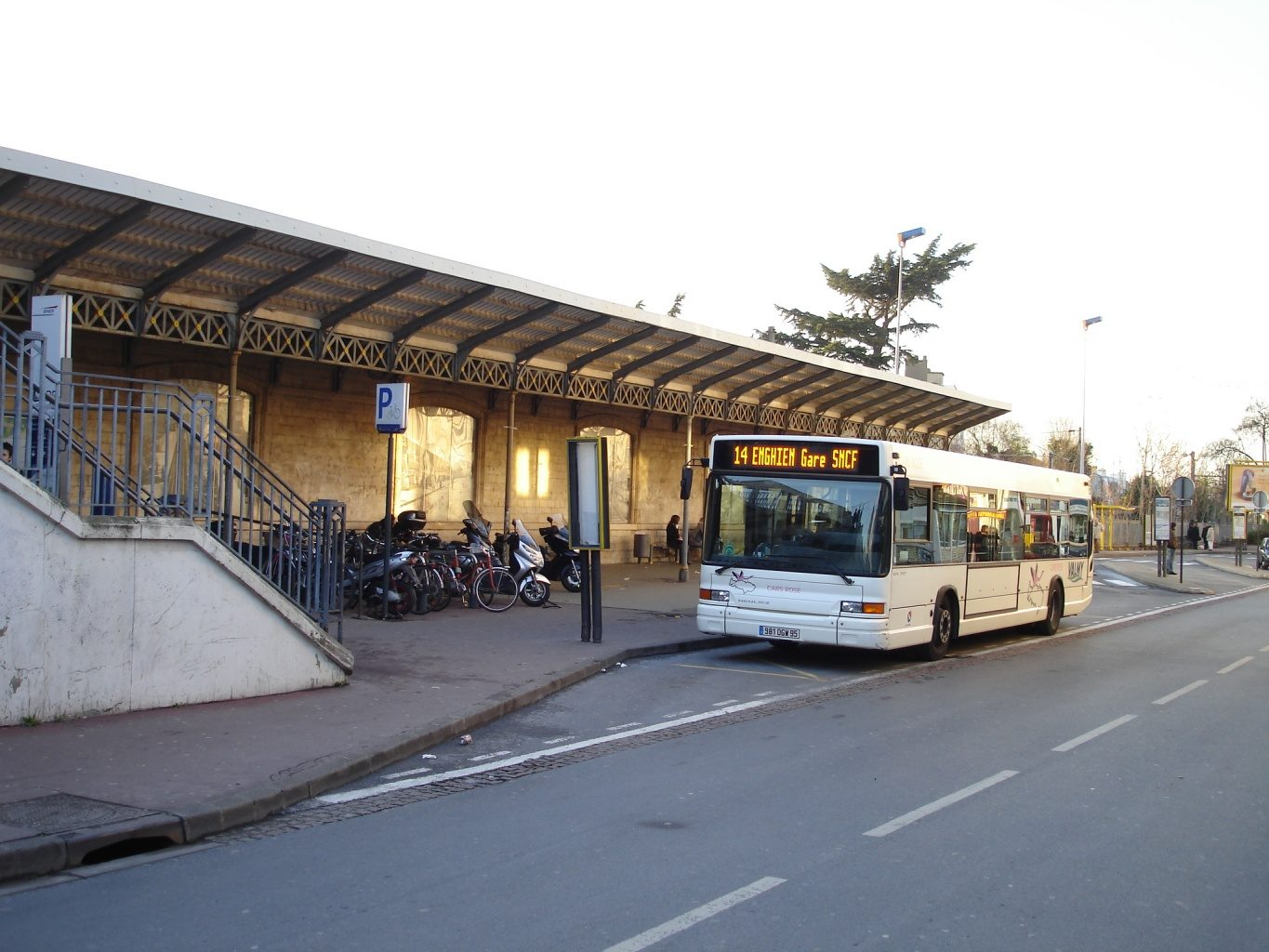
The bus station

== See also ==
- List of SNCF stations in Île-de-France
