= Deuil–Montmagny station =

French railway station

Deuil–Montmagny
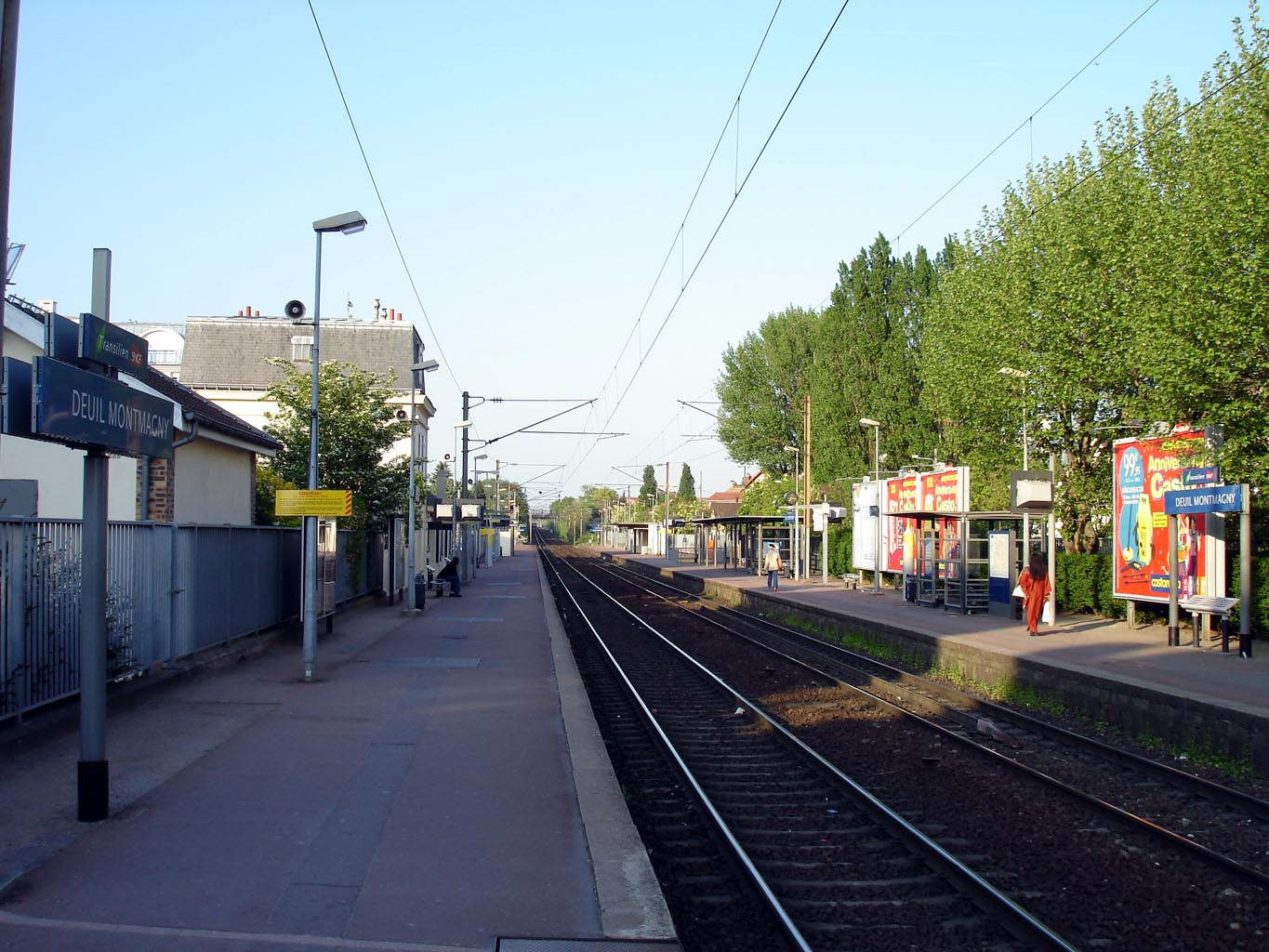
- The station's platform

General information
- Location: Deuil-la-Barre, France
- Coordinates: 48.9758°N 2.3377°E
- Owner: SNCF
- Line: Épinay-Villetaneuse–Le Tréport-Mers railway
- Platforms: 2
- Tracks: 2

Construction
- Parking: 145

Other information
- Station code: 87276345
- Fare zone: 4

History
- Opened: 1877

Passengers
- 2024: 3,353,751

Services
Preceding station	Transilien	Following station
Épinay–Villetaneuse towards Paris-Nord	Line H	Groslay towards Persan–Beaumont or Luzarches
Location

Deuil–Montmagny station is a railway station in Deuil-la-Barre, France, that also serves Montmagny. It is situated on the Épinay-Villetaneuse–Le Tréport-Mers railway, between Gare d'Épinay-Villetaneuse and Gare de Persan-Beaumont. It is served by Transilien trains from Paris-Nord to Persan-Beaumont and to Luzarches. The annual number of passengers was 3,353,751 in 2024. The station has 145 free parking spaces. (in French) The station was opened in 1877, when the Épinay-Villetaneuse – Persan-Beaumont section of the Épinay-Villetaneuse–Le Tréport-Mers railway was opened by the Compagnie des chemins de fer du Nord.

== Bus routes ==
- RATP : RATP Bus: 256 556

== Gallery ==
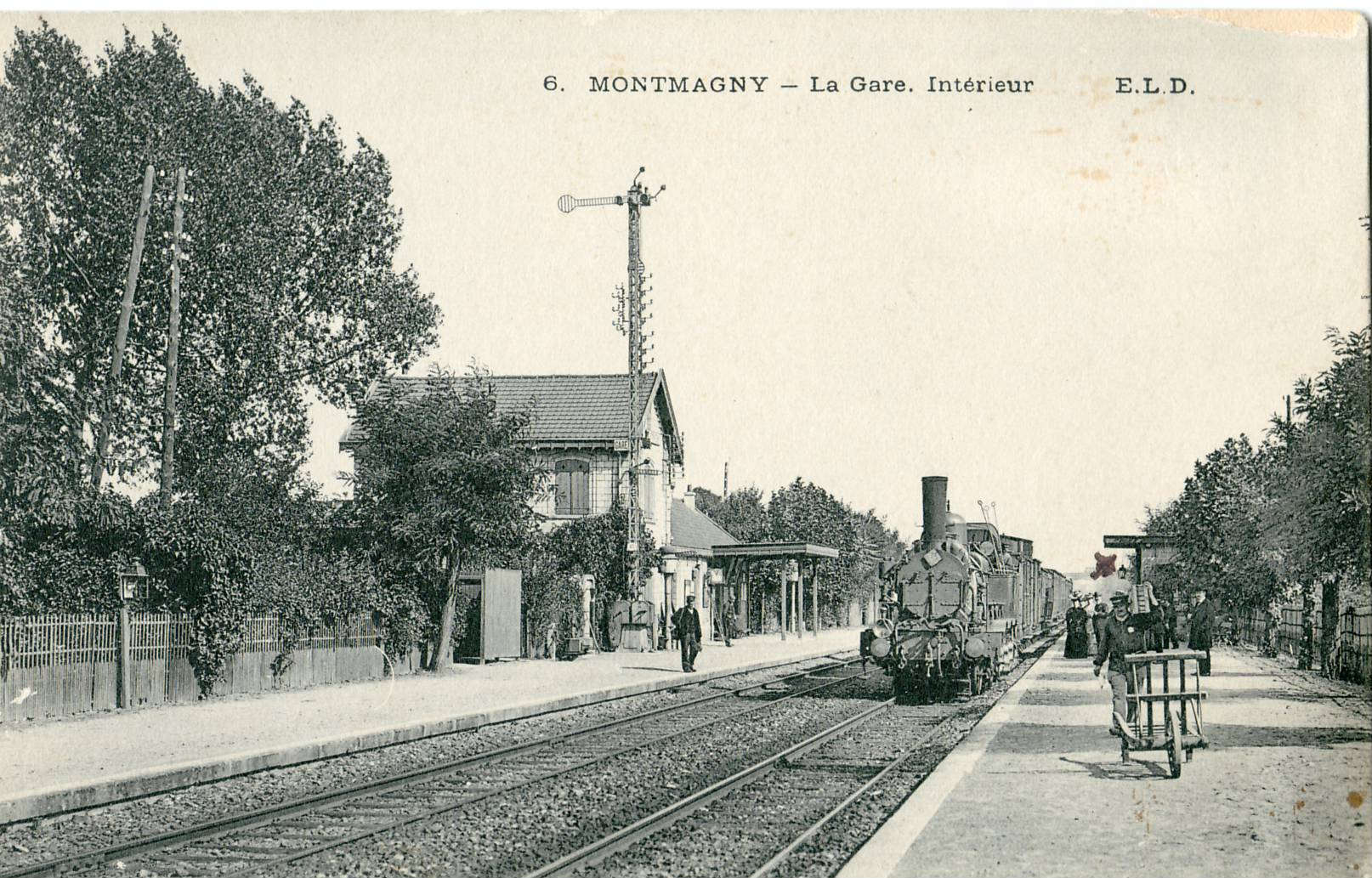
Gare de Deuil-Montmagny in the early 20th century

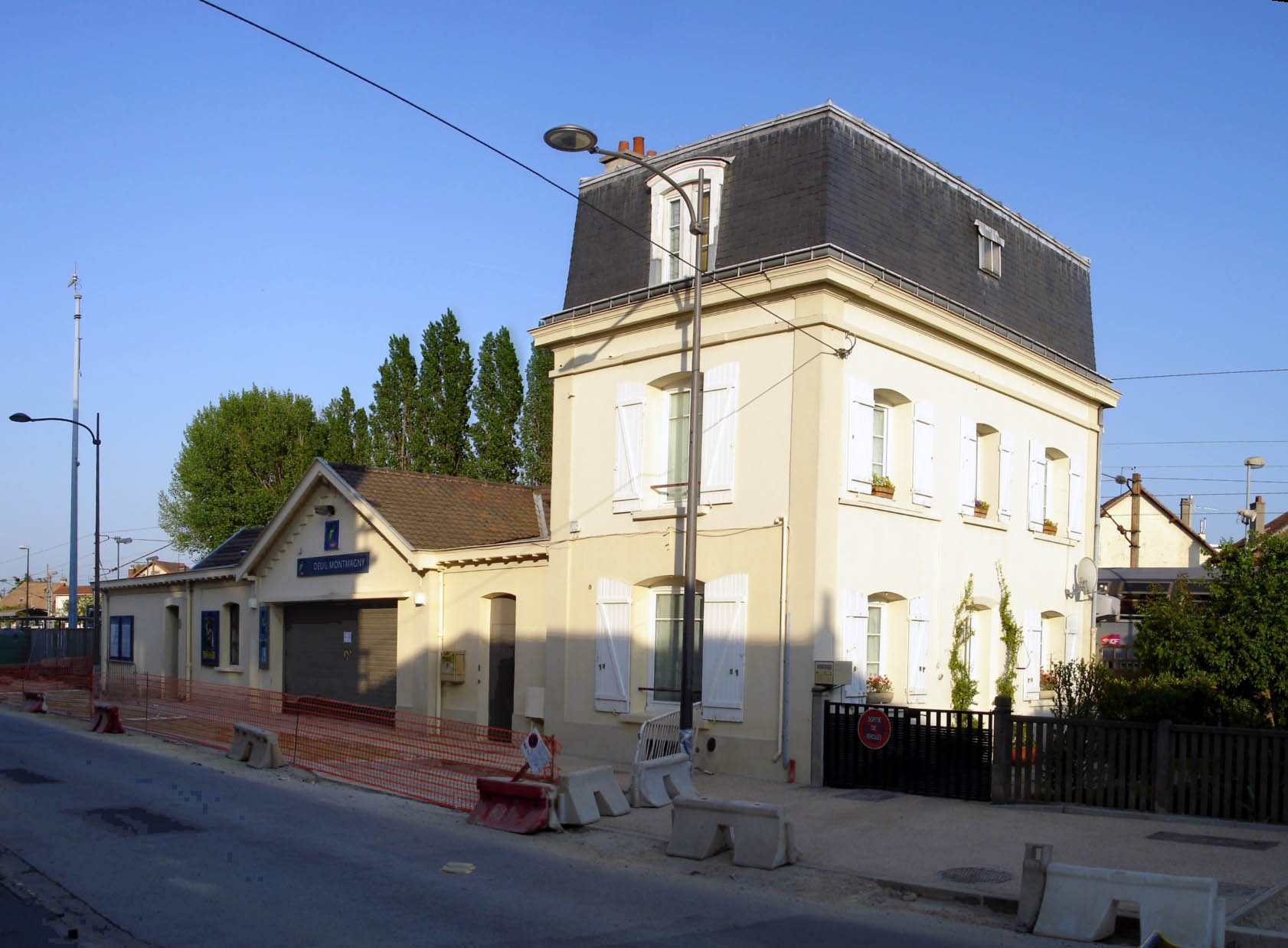
The station seen from the road
