= Hôtel de Ville, Deuil-la-Barre =

Town hall in Deuil-la-Barre, France

Hôtel de Ville
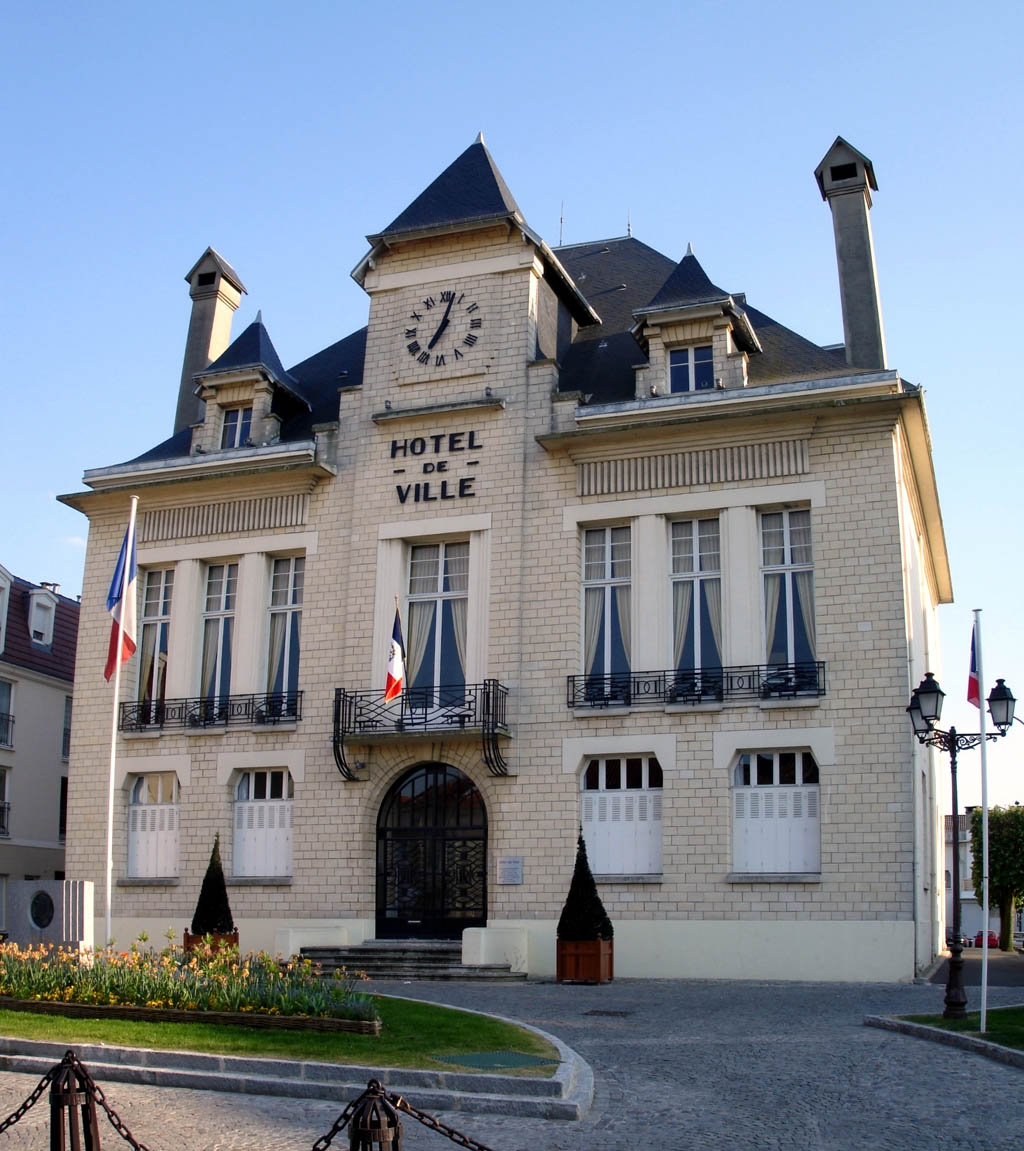
- The main frontage of the Hôtel de Ville in April 2007
- Interactive map of the Hôtel de Ville area

General information
- Type: City hall
- Architectural style: Art Deco style
- Location: Deuil-la-Barre, France
- Coordinates: 48.9753°N 2.3284°E
- Completed: 1935

Design and construction
- Architect: Louis Ponsin

The Hôtel de Ville (French pronunciation: [otɛl də vil], City Hall) is a municipal building in Deuil-la-Barre, Val-d'Oise, in the northern suburbs of Paris, standing on Rue Charles de Gaulle.

== History ==
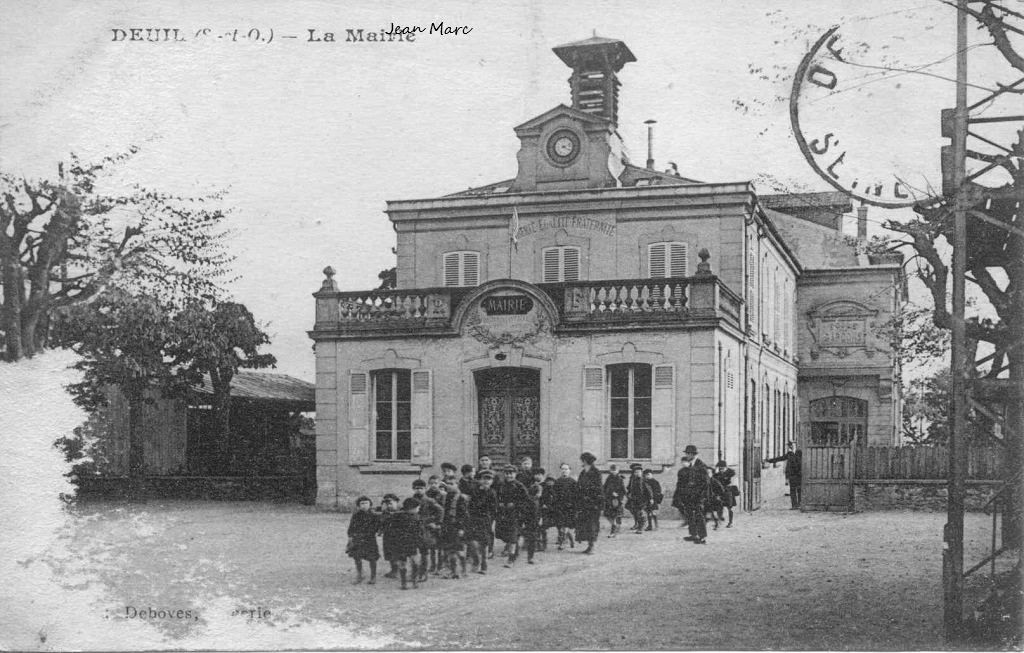
The old town hall

Following the French Revolution, the new town council initially met in the old buildings of the former priory on the north side of the Church of Notre-Dame-et-Saint-Eugène. This arrangement continued until the late 1850s, when the council led by the mayor, Gilbert Powney, decided to commission a dedicated town hall. The site they selected was on the south side of what is now Rue Charles de Gaulle. The building was designed in the neoclassical style, built in ashlar stone and was completed in 1860.

The design involved a symmetrical main frontage of three bays facing onto the street. The complex comprised a single-storey entrance block, and a two-storey main structure extending to the rear. The entrance block featured a segmental-headed doorway with a keystone flanked by a pair of segmental-headed windows with keystones. The entrance block was surmounted by a parapet which was broken at the centre by a round-headed pediment inscribed with the word "Mairie" in the tympanum. The main block, which was only visible at first-floor level, was fenestrated by three segmental-headed windows with keystones. At roof level, the main block was surmounted by a cornice and a clock.

In the early 1930s, following significant population growth, the council led by the mayor, Paul Fleury, decided to demolish the old town hall and to erect a new town hall on the same site. The new building was designed by Louis Ponsin in the Art Deco style, built in light-coloured bricks with stone finishings and was completed in 1935.

The design again involved a symmetrical main frontage of three bays facing onto the street but, this time, without the entrance block. The central bay featured a round-headed opening with voussoirs and a keystone on the ground floor, a French door with a stone surround and a balcony on the first floor, and a clock tower with a pyramid-shaped roof above. The outer bays were fenestrated by pairs of casement windows on the ground floor, by tall tri-partite windows on the first floor and by dormer windows at attic level. Internally, the principal rooms were the grand staircase and the Salle des Mariages (wedding hall), which extended along the full length of the building. The rooms were decorated with fine murals by Henri Prosper Wirth and the floors were decorated with fine mosaic tiles.

Following the liberation of the town by the French 2nd Armoured Division, commanded by General Philippe Leclerc, on 25 August 1944, during the Second World War, the mayor, Paul Fleury, went onto the balcony and waved to the crowd.

Former school buildings, located behind the town hall, were converted for use as offices for council staff in 1971. A serious fire, which started in the attic on 27 February 1986, caused extensive damage to the roof although the fire service brought it under control before the fire could spread to the rooms on the first floor. The building was designated as being "Patrimoine d'intérêt régional" (heritage of regional interest) in November 2025.
