= Gennevilliers station =

Railway station in Gennevilliers, France

Coordinates: 48°56′0″N 2°18′28″E

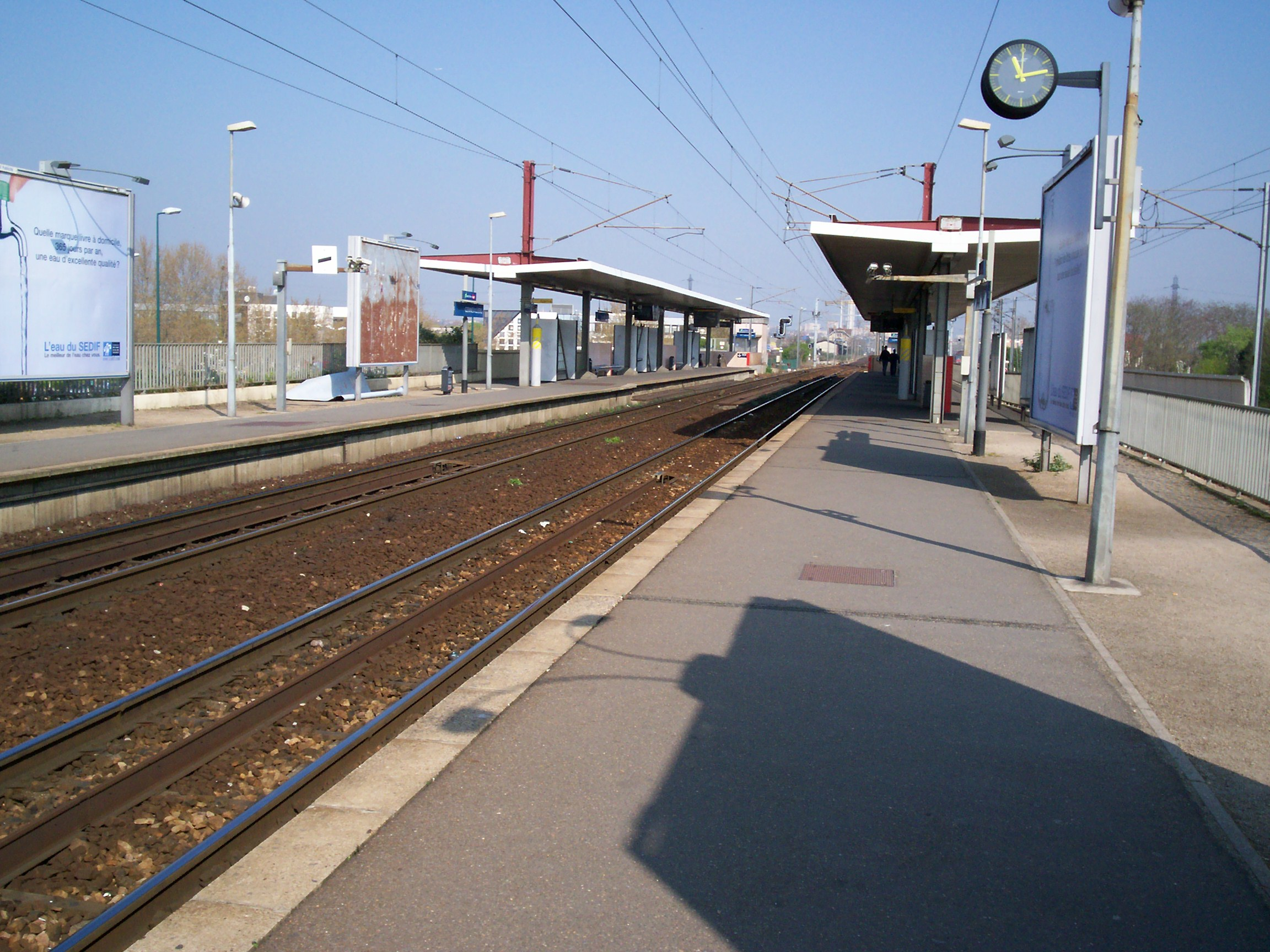
Platforms

Gennevilliers is a station in Paris's express suburban rail system, the RER. It is situated in Gennevilliers, in the département of Hauts-de-Seine.

An interchange with tramway T1 is available.

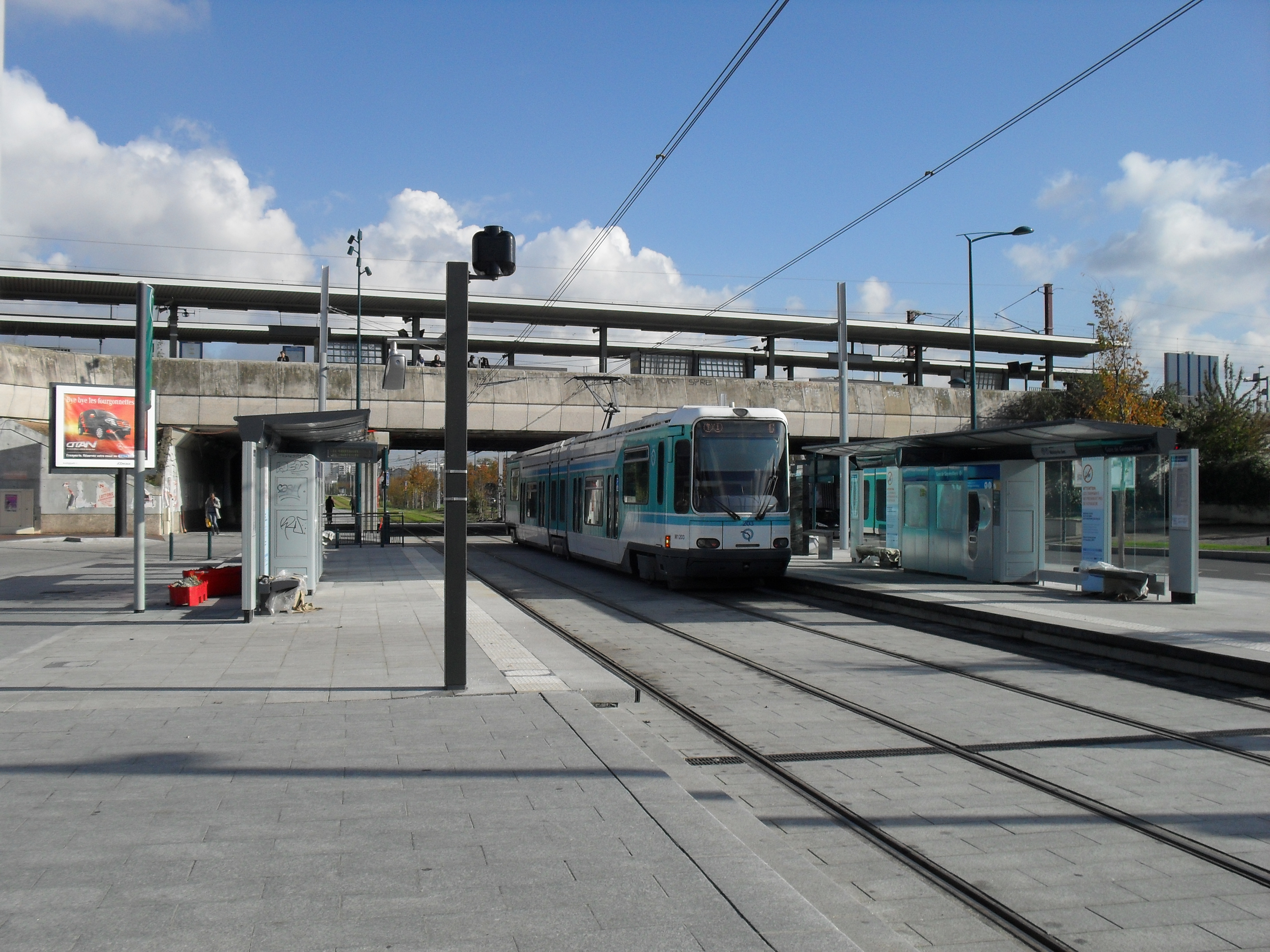
Tram stop with railway station platforms behind

== See also ==
- List of stations of the Paris RER

Preceding station	RER	Following station
Épinay-sur-Seine towards Pontoise	RER C	Les Grésillons towards Massy-Palaiseau or Dourdan-la-Forêt
Preceding station	Tram	Following station
Timbaud towards Asnières–Quatre Routes	T1	Parc des Chanteraines towards Noisy-le-Sec
