= Canton of Deuil-la-Barre =

Coordinates: 48.97°N 2.32°E

The canton of Deuil-la-Barre is an administrative division of the Val-d'Oise department, Île-de-France region, northern France. Its borders were modified at the French canton reorganisation which came into effect in March 2015. Its seat is in Deuil-la-Barre.

It consists of the following communes:

1. Deuil-la-Barre
2. Groslay
3. Montmagny
4. Saint-Brice-sous-Forêt
