= La Barre Ormesson station =

French railway station

La Barre Ormesson
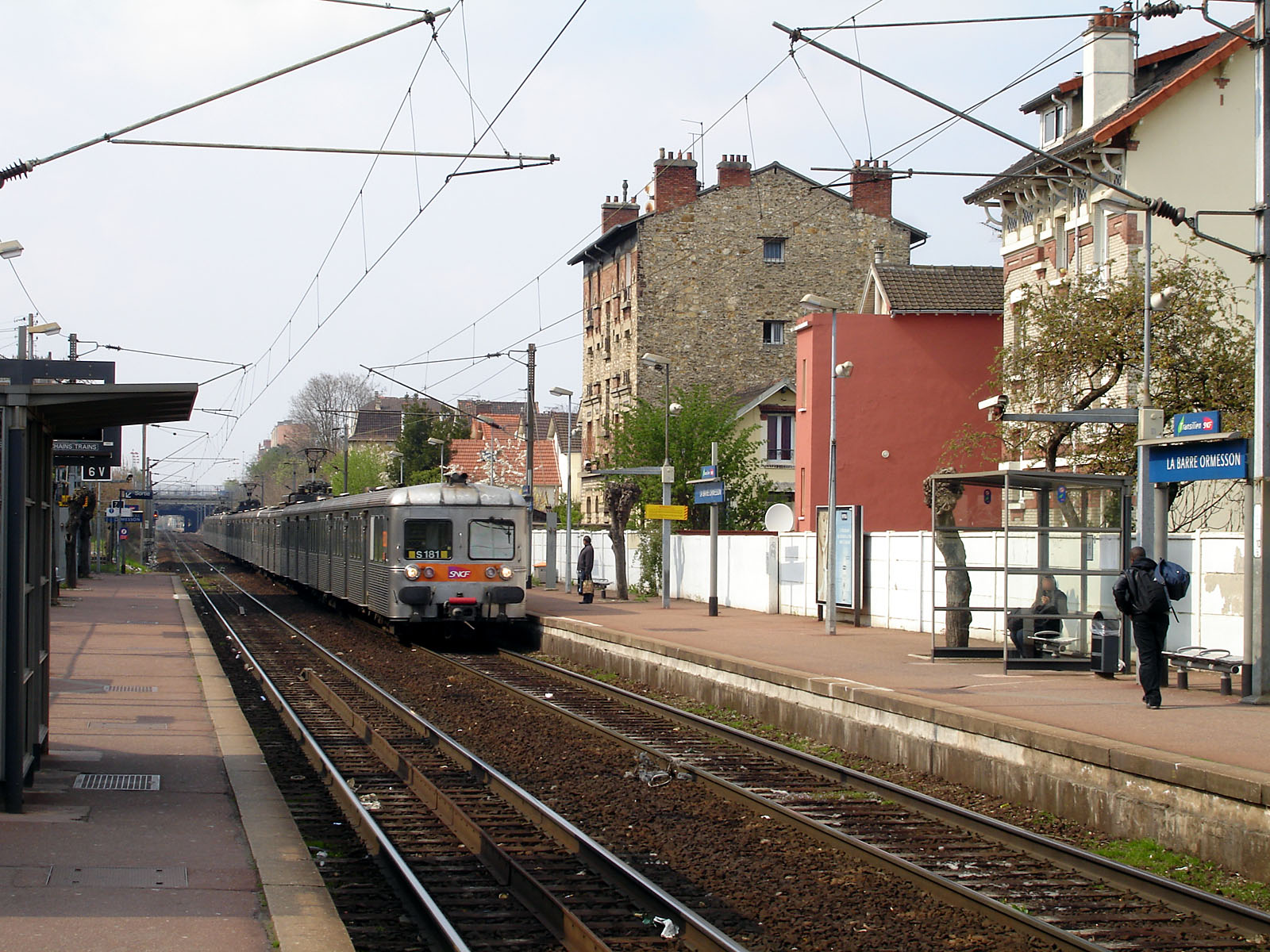
- A part of the station under renovation

General information
- Location: Deuil-la-Barre, France
- Coordinates: 48°57′59″N 2°18′59″E
- Owner: SNCF
- Line: Saint-Denis–Dieppe railway
- Platforms: 2 platforms
- Tracks: 2 tracks

Other information
- Station code: 87271171
- Fare zone: 5

History
- Opened: 1891

Passengers
- 2024: 3,252,736

Services
| Preceding station | Transilien | Following station |
|---|---|---|
| Épinay–Villetaneuse towards Paris-Nord | Line H | Enghien-les-Bains towards Pontoise or Persan–Beaumont |
Location

La Barre Ormesson is a railway station in the commune of Deuil-la-Barre (Val-d'Oise department), France. The station is served by Transilien H trains, on the lines from Paris to Persan–Beaumont and Pontoise. The annual number of passengers was 3,252,736 in 2024.

== History ==
La Barre Ormesson is located on the original Paris–Lille line, which was opened on 20 June 1846 by Compagnie des chemins de fer du Nord (North Railway Company). This line passed along the Montmorency Valley (Ermont-Eaubonne), and headed towards the northeast at Saint-Ouen-l'Aumône, continuing through the Oise valley. In 1859, a more direct line along Chantilly was opened. The Paris–Pontoise line was electrified in 1969.

== Service ==
The station is served every 15 minutes and eight trains an hour during peak hours. It takes 9 to 15 minutes to reach Paris.

== Bus connections ==
- RATP; 256, 356 and 556

== See also ==
- List of SNCF stations in Île-de-France
