= Le Bourget station =

Railway station in Le Bourget, France

Le Bourget
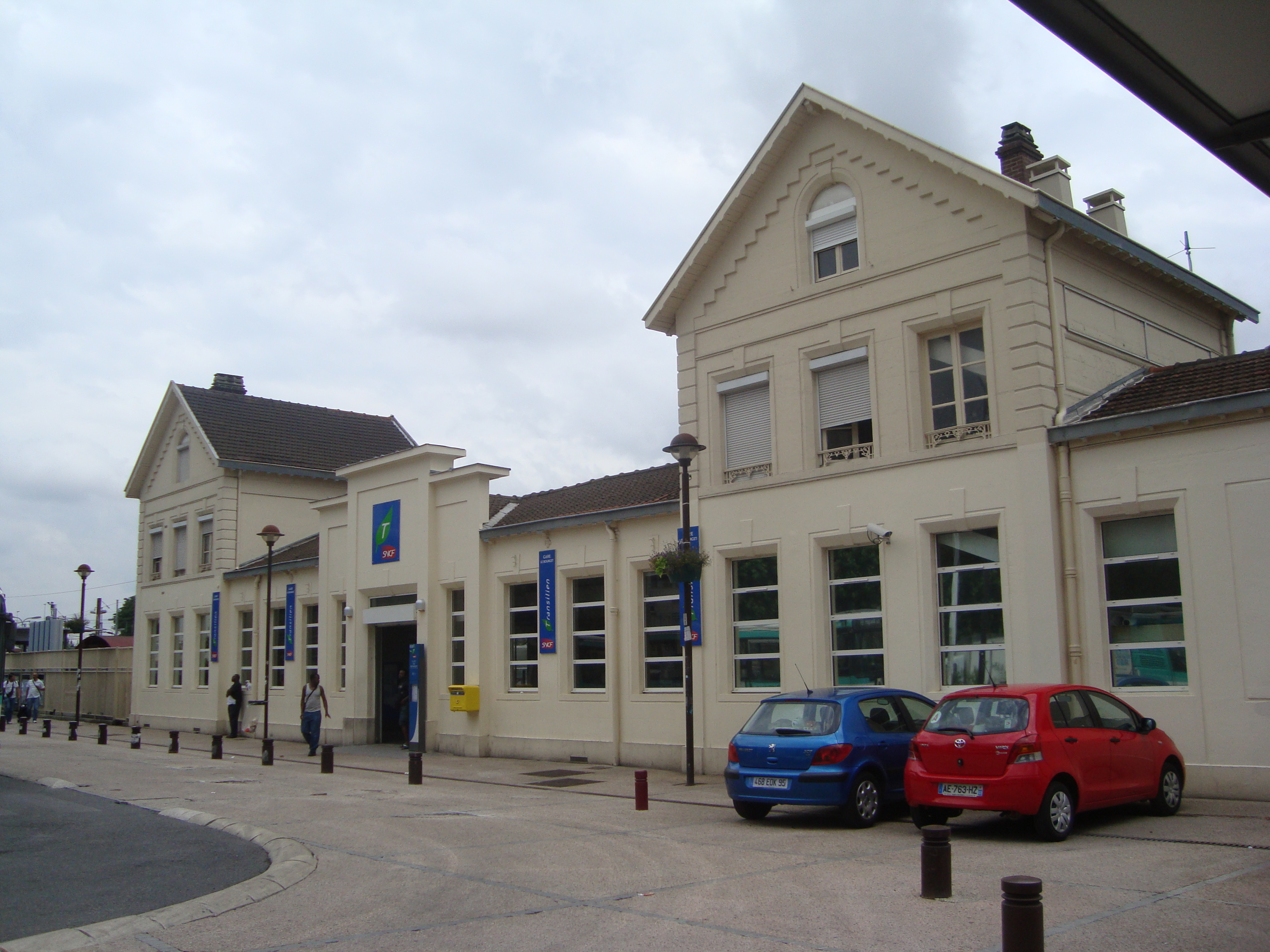
- Le Bourget station house

General information
- Location: Place des Déportés; Le Bourget; France
- Coordinates: 48°55′51″N 2°25′34″E
- Operator: SNCF

Construction
- Accessible: Yes, by prior reservation

Other information
- Station code: 87271395
- Fare zone: 3

History
- Opened: 1863

Passengers
- 2024: 23,702,564

Services
Preceding station	RER	Following station
Drancy towards Aéroport Charles de Gaulle 2 TGV or Mitry–Claye	RER B	La Courneuve–Aubervilliers towards Robinson or Saint-Rémy-lès-Chevreuse
Preceding station	Tram	Following station
Dugny–La Courneuve towards Épinay-sur-Seine	T11	Terminus

Other services
Preceding station	Paris Metro	Following station
La Courneuve–Six Routes towards Saint-Denis–Pleyel	Line 16 (2027)	Parc du Blanc-Mesnil towards Clichy–Montfermeil
La Courneuve–Six Routes towards Saint-Denis–Pleyel	Line 17 (2027)	Le Bourget Aéroport Terminus
Location

Le Bourget station is a station on the RER B of the Réseau Express Régional, a hybrid suburban commuter and rapid transit line. The station is also served by Île-de-France tramway Line 11 Express. The station will be where the Paris Metro Line 16 and Paris Metro Line 17 divide, with Line 16 heading to Noisy–Champs and Line 17 going to Le Mesnil-Amelot. It is named after the town of Le Bourget where the station is located, a northern suburb of Paris, in the Seine-Saint-Denis department of France.

== History ==
Le Bourget station was the primary point of deportation for French Jews during the Holocaust. Between 27 March 1942 and 23 June 1943, 42 trains carrying 40,450 Jews left Le Bourget for Auschwitz concentration camp and other extermination camps in Poland. Most had been imprisoned in the nearby Drancy internment camp.
