= Île-de-France tramway Line 11 Express =

Tram line in Seine-Saint-Denis and Val-d'Oise, north of Paris

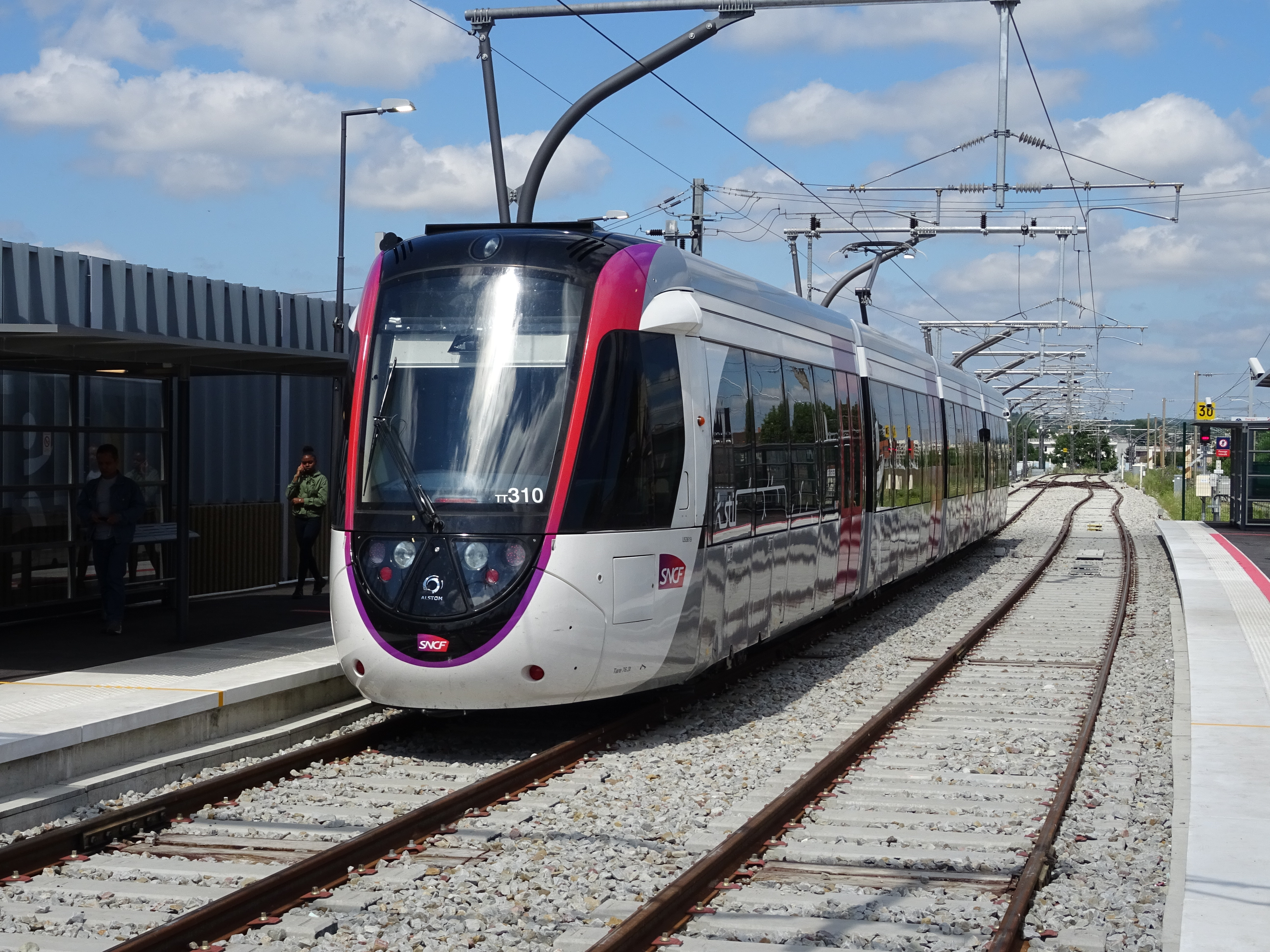
- Île-de-France tramway Line 11 Express at the Épinay-sur-Seine terminal

Overview
- Owner: Île-de-France Mobilités
- Termini: Épinay-sur-Seine; Le Bourget
- Stations: 7

Service
- Type: Tram-train
- System: Tramways in Île-de-France
- Operator: Stretto
- Rolling stock: Alstom Citadis Dualis

History
- Opened: 1 July 2017; 9 years ago

Technical
- Line length: 11 km (6.8 mi)
- Track gauge: 1,435 mm (4 ft 8 1/2 in) standard gauge
Route map

Île-de-France tramway Line T11 Express (known as the Tangentielle Nord and Tram Express Nord during the planning phase) is a suburban tram-train line in France. Opened in June 2017, it links Épinay-sur-Seine with Le Bourget, with planned extensions linking Sartrouville to Noisy-le-Sec. The line is operated by Stretto, a joint venture 51% owned by Keolis and 49% owned by SNCF Voyageurs.

== Route ==
The line, when completed, is planned to be 28 kilometres (17 miles) long, running from Sartrouville to Noisy-le-Sec, from the northwestern to the northeastern suburbs of Paris. It will have interchanges with existing Transilien train lines, trams, metro, and Réseau Express Régional (RER) lines A, B, C, D and E. There will be six new stations and eight interchange stations. The route runs on new tracks along the Grande Ceinture.

== Construction ==
The project, which was granted approval in May 2008, was planned by Syndicat des transports d'Île-de-France (STIF) and jointly managed by SNCF and Réseau Ferré de France (RFF).

Work on the initial section of the line started in 2009, and it opened on June 30, 2017. It consists of 7 stations from Epinay-sur-Seine to Le Bourget stations, for a total travel time of 15 minutes, an average speed of around 50 km/h (31 mph) and sections allowing maximum speed of 100 km/h (62 mph).

Two extensions are planned: a westerly extension with four stations from Sartrouville to Epinay-sur-Seine, and an easterly extension with three stations from Le Bourget to Noisy-le-Sec. The opening of both extensions is planned for 2033, though this has not been confirmed as of 2024.

The total line's overall cost is estimated to be around €1.5 billion.
