= Montmagny, Val-d'Oise =

Montmagny
- Commune
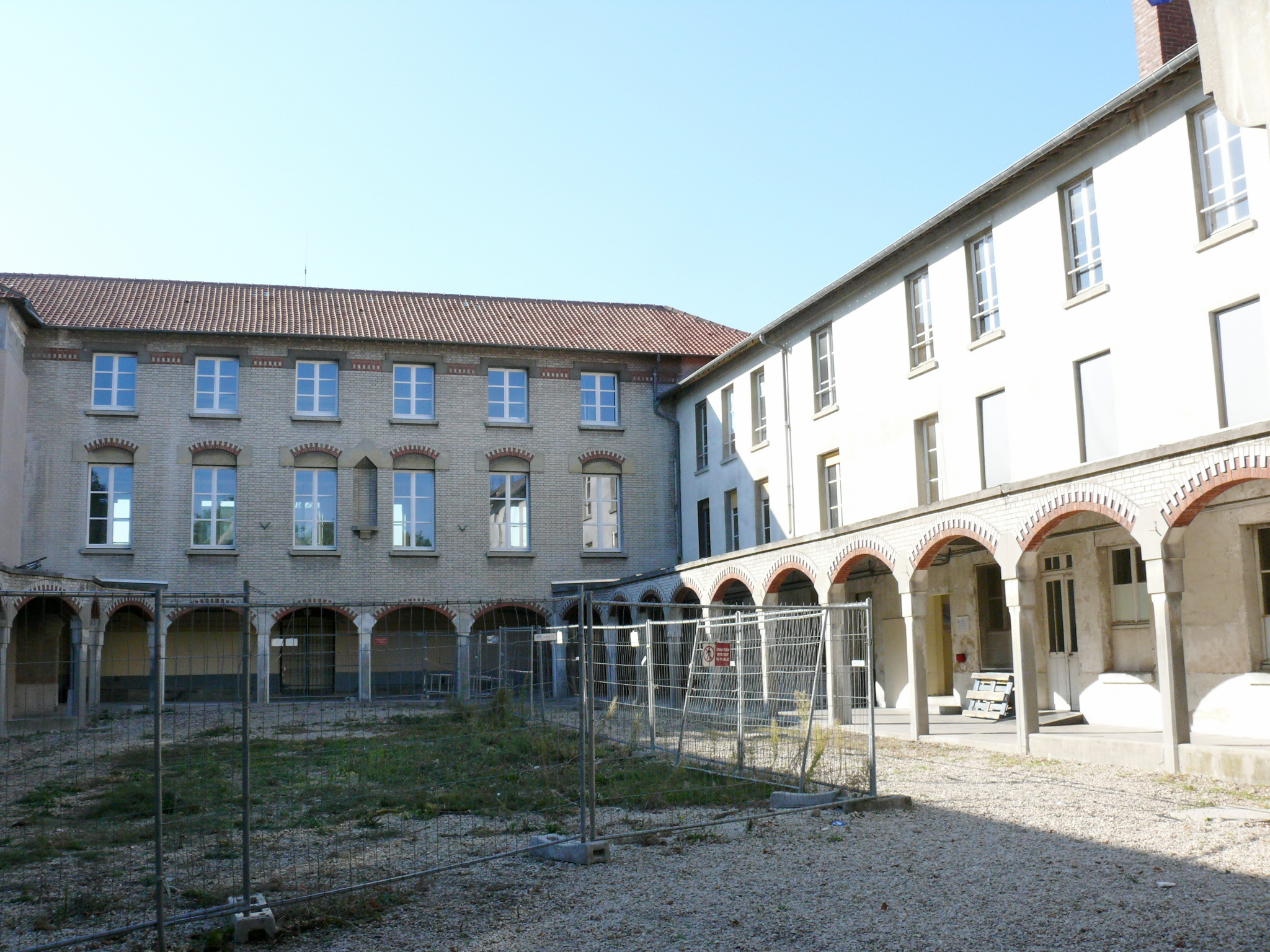
- The former seminary, in Montmagny

- Coat of arms
- Location of Montmagny
- Location within France Location within Île-de-France (region)
- Coordinates: 48°58′28″N 2°20′48″E
- Country: France
- Region: Île-de-France
- Department: Val-d'Oise
- Arrondissement: Sarcelles
- Canton: Deuil-la-Barre
- Intercommunality: CA Plaine Vallée

Government
  - Mayor (2020–2026): Patrick Floquet
- Area^{1}: 2.91 km^{2} (1.12 sq mi)
- Population (2023): 15,105
  - Density: 5,190/km^{2} (13,400/sq mi)
- Time zone: UTC+01:00 (CET)
  - Summer (DST): UTC+02:00 (CEST)
- INSEE/Postal code: 95427 /95360
- ^{1} French Land Register data, which excludes lakes, ponds, glaciers > 1 km^{2} (0.386 sq mi or 247 acres) and river estuaries.

Montmagny (French pronunciation: [mɔ̃maɲi]) is a commune in the Val-d'Oise department in Île-de-France in northern France.

== Transport ==
The north of Montmagny is served by the Deuil - Montmagny station and the south by the Épinay–Villetaneuse station, both on the Transilien Paris-Nord suburban rail network.

== Population ==
Historical population
Year	Pop.	±% p.a.
1968	6,584	—
1975	7,382	+1.65%
1982	8,977	+2.83%
1990	11,505	+3.15%
1999	13,090	+1.44%
2007	14,037	+0.88%
2012	13,814	−0.32%
2017	14,173	+0.51%
2023	15,105	+1.07%
Source: INSEE

== See also ==
- Communes of the Val-d'Oise department
