= Les Grésillons station =

Railway station in Gennevilliers, France

Coordinates: 48°55′12″N 2°18′51″E

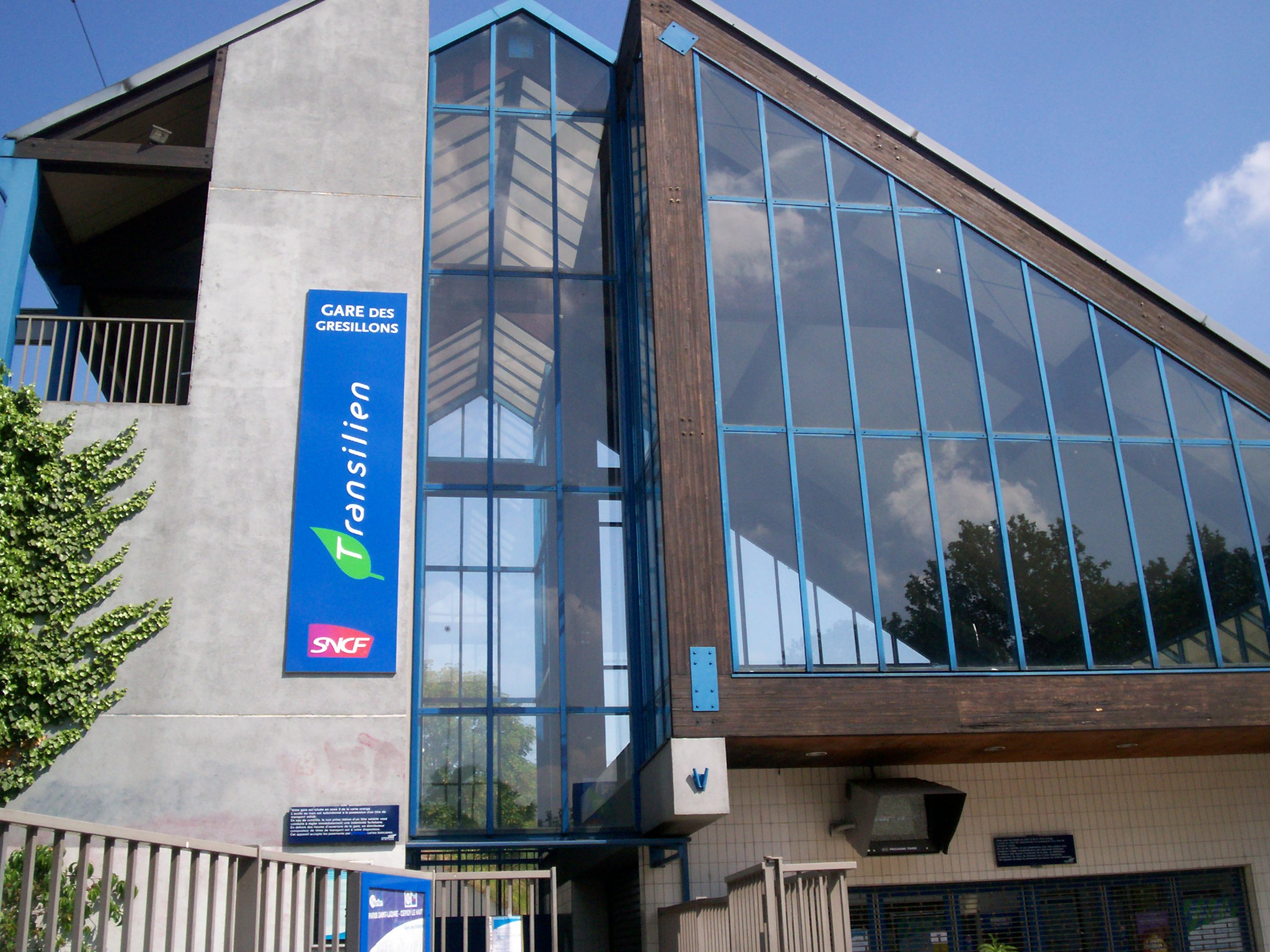
Entrance

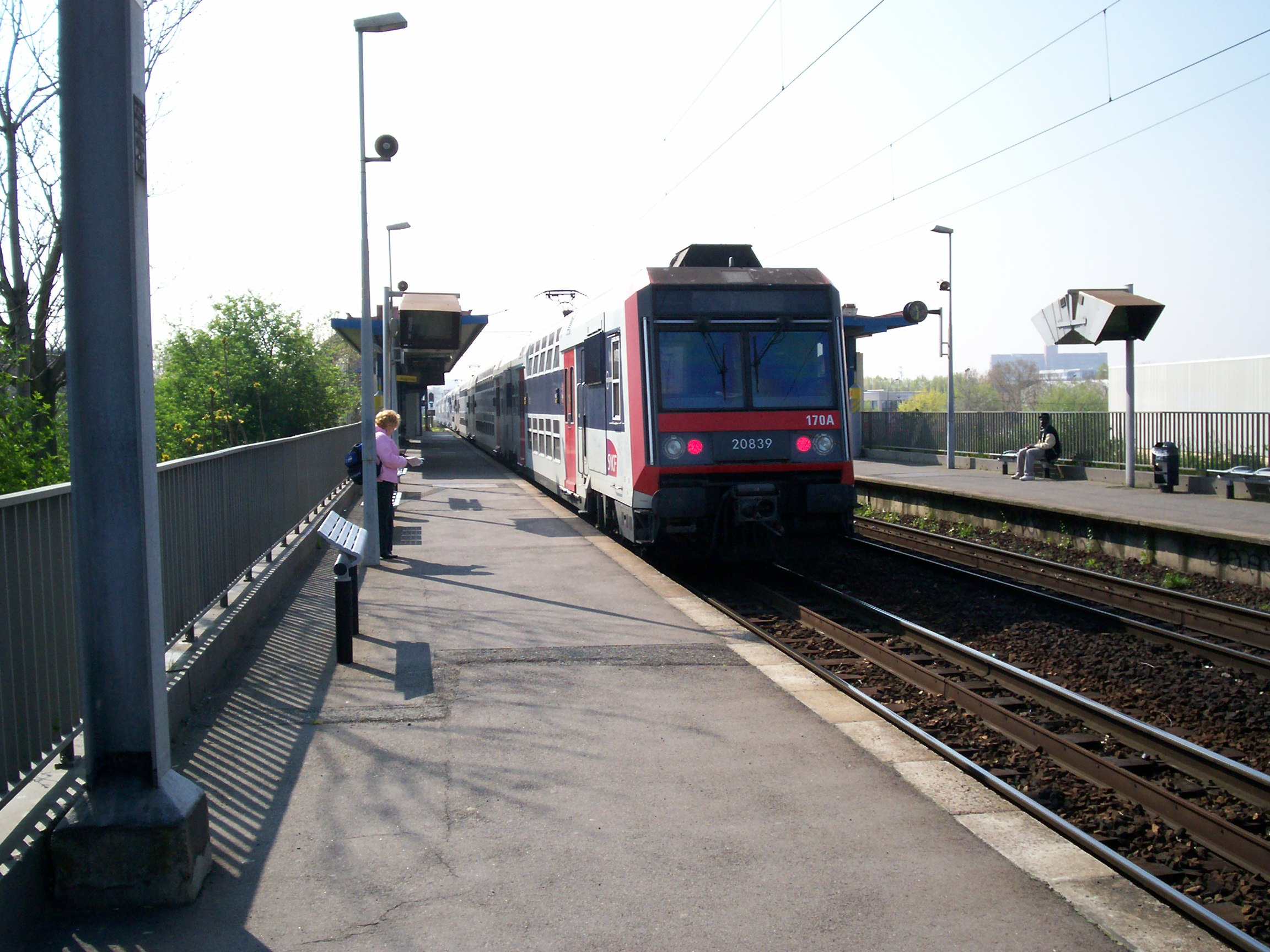
Platforms

Les Grésillons is a station in Paris' express suburban rail system, the RER. In the future, Paris Metro Line 15 will stop here. It is situated in Gennevilliers, in the département of Hauts-de-Seine, and close to the industrial zone of the Caboeufs.

== See also ==
- List of stations of the Paris RER

Preceding station	RER	Following station
Gennevilliers towards Pontoise	RER C	Saint-Ouen towards Massy-Palaiseau or Dourdan-la-Forêt
