= Deuil-la-Barre =

- Commune
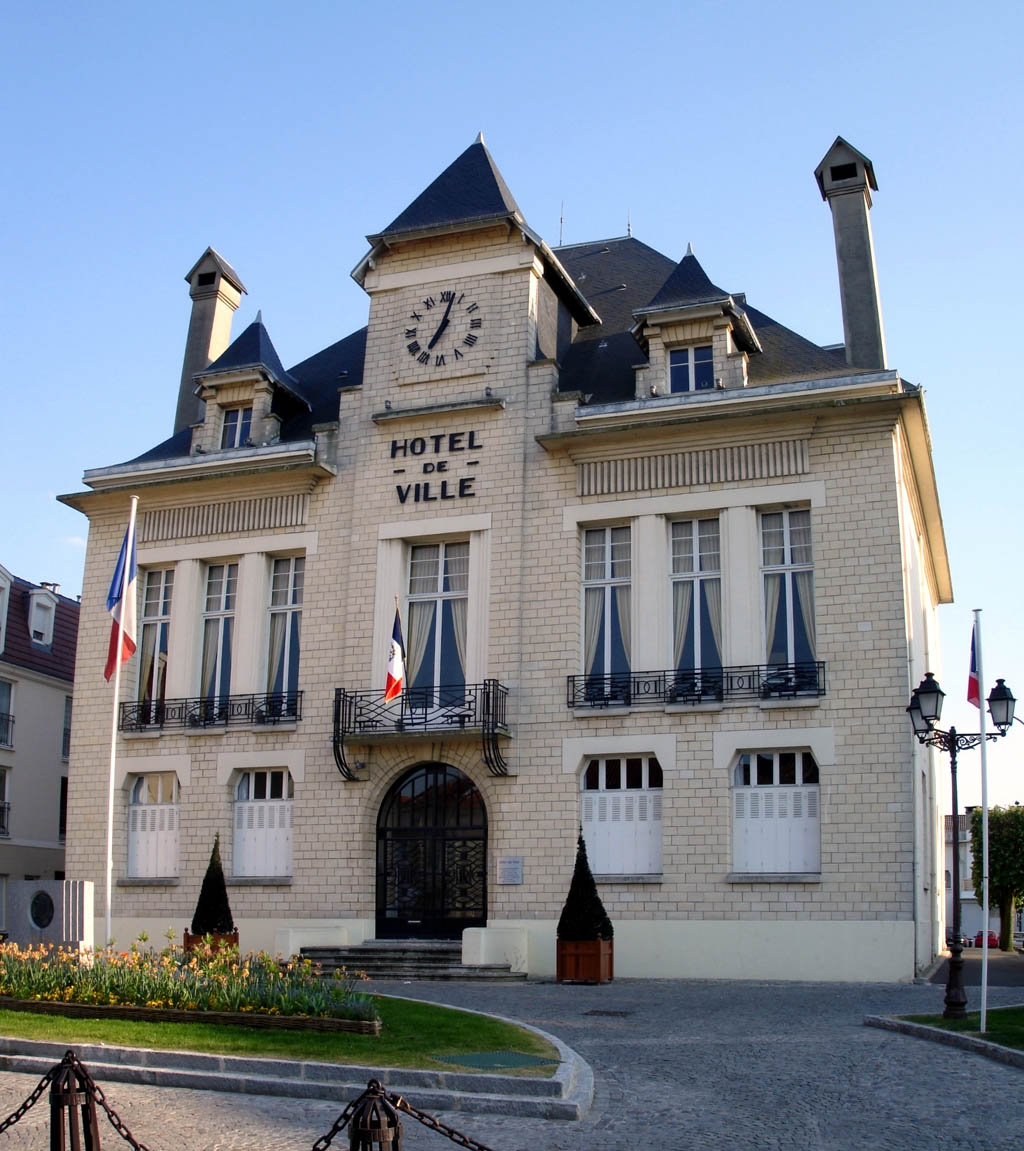
- The Hôtel de Ville

- Coat of arms

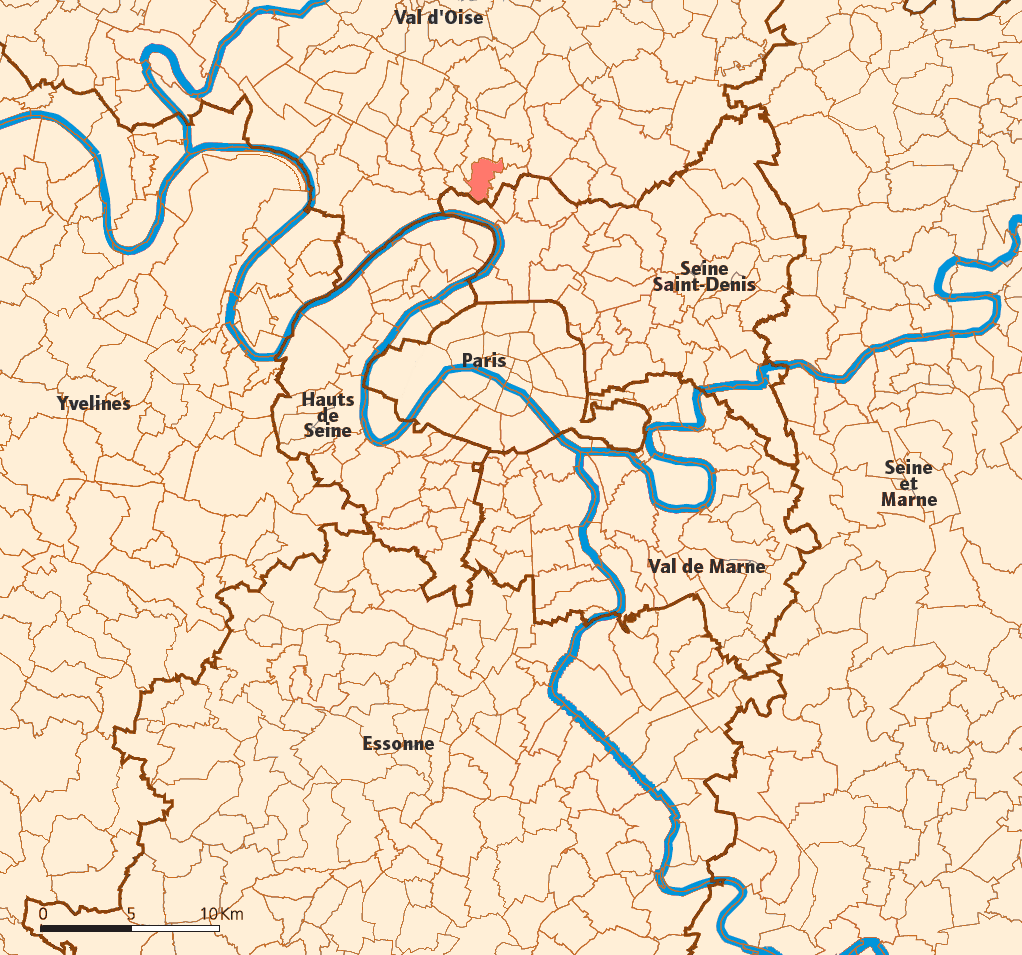
- Location (in red) within Paris inner and outer suburbs
- Location of Deuil-la-Barre
- Location within France Location within Île-de-France (region)
- Coordinates: 48°58′36″N 2°19′38″E
- Country: France
- Region: Île-de-France
- Department: Val-d'Oise
- Arrondissement: Sarcelles
- Canton: Deuil-la-Barre
- Intercommunality: CA Plaine Vallée

Government
  - Mayor (2020–2026): Muriel Scolan
- Area^{1}: 3.76 km^{2} (1.45 sq mi)
- Population (2023): 23,099
  - Density: 6,140/km^{2} (15,900/sq mi)
- Time zone: UTC+01:00 (CET)
  - Summer (DST): UTC+02:00 (CEST)
- INSEE/Postal code: 95197 /95170
- ^{1} French Land Register data, which excludes lakes, ponds, glaciers > 1 km^{2} (0.386 sq mi or 247 acres) and river estuaries.

Logo

Deuil-la-Barre (French pronunciation: [dœj la baʁ]) is a commune in the northern suburbs of Paris, France. It is in the Department of Val-d'Oise and the arrondissement of Sarcelles. It is 13.7 km (8.5 mi) from the centre of Paris. Despite this proximity to the metropolis, Deuil has retained much of the charm of a country village, with orchards and wooded hillsides.

== Name ==
In modern French, the word deuil means mourning. That is not, however, the derivation of this commune's name. The word is in fact Celtic, a combination of divo (God) and ialo (a clearing in a wood.) Historical citations include the toponyms Diogilum (862,) Doguillum, Diogilo (9th century,) and Villam Dueil (1070.)

Originally called simply Deuil, the name of the commune became officially Deuil-la-Barre on 7 December 1952. Barre here has the sense of a barrier or enclosure.

The demonym is Deuillois.

== History ==
On 7 August 1850, a part of the territory of Deuil-la-Barre (then called simply Deuil) was detached and merged with a part of the territory of Saint-Gratien, a part of the territory of Soisy-sous-Montmorency, and a part of the territory of Épinay-sur-Seine to create the commune of Enghien-les-Bains. The Hôtel de Ville was completed in 1935.

== Population ==
Historical population

Year	Pop.	±% p.a.
1793	998	—
1800	1,127	+1.75%
1806	1,162	+0.51%
1821	1,168	+0.03%
1831	1,287	+0.97%
1836	1,365	+1.18%
1841	1,419	+0.78%
1846	1,552	+1.81%
1851	1,401	−2.03%
1856	1,528	+1.75%
1861	1,778	+3.08%
1866	2,182	+4.18%
1872	1,932	−2.01%
1876	2,009	+0.98%
1881	2,090	+0.79%
1886	2,472	+3.41%
1891	2,617	+1.15%
1896	3,040	+3.04%
1901	3,410	+2.32%

Year	Pop.	±% p.a.
1906	3,704	+1.67%
1911	4,351	+3.27%
1921	5,257	+1.91%
1926	6,694	+4.95%
1931	8,069	+3.81%
1936	9,125	+2.49%
1946	9,338	+0.23%
1954	10,335	+1.28%
1962	13,681	+3.57%
1968	15,613	+2.23%
1975	15,689	+0.07%
1982	16,387	+0.62%
1990	19,062	+1.91%
1999	20,160	+0.62%
2007	21,425	+0.76%
2012	21,983	+0.52%
2017	22,306	+0.29%
2023	23,099	+0.58%

Source: EHESS and INSEE (1968-2023)

== Transport ==
Deuil-la-Barre is served by two stations on the Transilien Paris-Nord suburban rail network: Deuil-Montmagny and La Barre-Ormesson. Trains run from the Gare du Nord to Deuil-Montmagny on the quarter hour, the journey taking 14 minutes.

== Education ==
Government/public kindergartens/Preschools include: Antoine de Saint-Exupery, Gallieni, Henri Hatrel, Jules Ferry, Lac Marchais, Mortefontaines, and Pasteur.

Government/public primary/elementary schools include: Henri Hatrel, Mortefontaines, Pasteur I, Pasteur II, and Poincaré.

There are two government/public lower secondary/junior high schools: Collège Denis Diderot and Collège Émilie du Châtelet, as well as one government/public senior high school/sixth-form college: Lycée Camille Saint-Saëns.

There is a private primary/elementary school: École Sainte-Marie.

== Parks and recreation ==
Parks include: de la Chevrette, Winston Churchill, de la Galathée, Victor Labarrière, and des Presles.

== Cultural amenities ==
=== Municipal school of music ===
The school at 2, Rue Jean Bouin is called The Cornet School after its founder Maurice Cornet. With a staff of around 30, the school offers a comprehensive education in many musical instruments and music styles.

=== Library ===
The municipal library at 38, Rue Soeur Azélie is a meeting place and a place for study, open to the general public. More than 30,000 reference sources are available. Services include loans, internet access, and photocopying. Subscription is free to children and registered students.

=== Museum ===
The town museum was established in 1984 by Michel Bourlet, a local historian. It shares premises with the school of music, both of which occupy the old keeper's lodge of the Château de La Chevrette. After refurbishment in 2012, the museum today presents a permanent exhibition organised around three central themes: religious life, land ownership, and economic/sociological development. The aim is to offer visitors a synoptic view of 2,000 years of significant events in the region's history..

=== C2i ===
C2i (Centre d'information et d'initiatives) at 35, Rue Abel Fauveau is a public space dedicated to new technologies. It is an educational resource open to the general public, offering performances, exhibitions and film screenings. Nine computer workstations are available. C2i has something to offer everyone: elementary and high school pupils, college students, seniors, the handicapped, job seekers and associations. It is divided into two multimedia labs, an audiovisual auditorium and a general meeting hall.

=== Festival hall ===
The municipal festival hall (''salle des fêtes'') on Avenue Schaeffer hosts cultural and community events throughout the year, including concerts, theatre performances, and local exhibitions.

== International relations ==
Deuil-la-Barre is twinned with:

- Nieder-Eschbach (Frankfurt), Germany (1967)
- Vác, Hungary (1991)
- Winsford, United Kingdom (1992)
- Lourinhã, Portugal (2009)

== See also ==
- Communes of the Val-d'Oise department
