= Taverny station =

Railway station in Taverny, France

Taverny
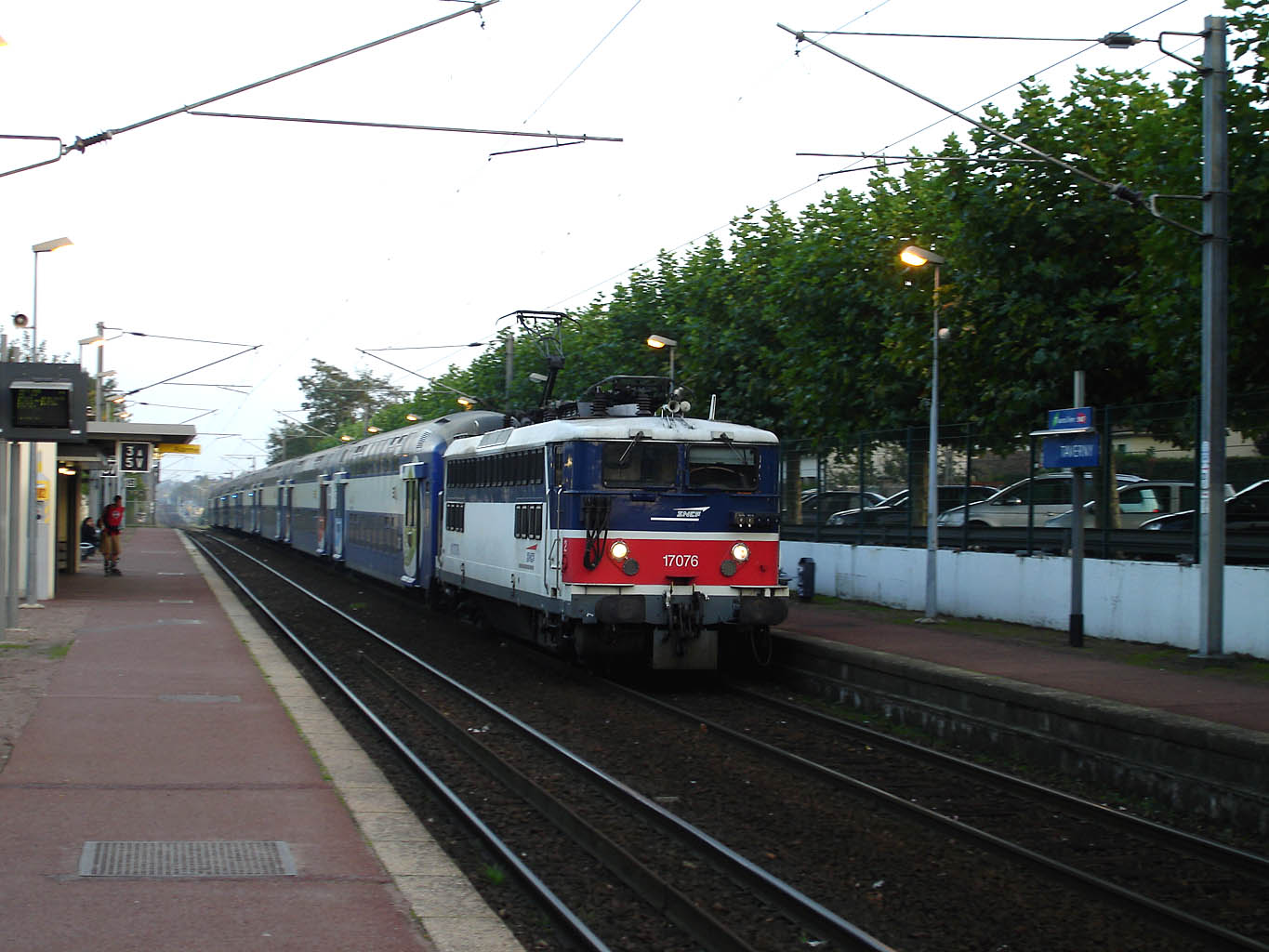

General information
- Location: Taverny, France
- Coordinates: 49°1′31″N 2°13′17″E
- Owner: SNCF
- Platforms: 2 platforms and 2 walkways

Other information
- Station code: 87276634

History
- Opened: 1876
- Electrified: 1970

Passengers
- 2024: 1,621,261

Services
Preceding station	Transilien	Following station
Vaucelles towards Paris-Nord	Line H	Bessancourt towards Persan–Beaumont
Location

Taverny is a railway station located in the commune of Taverny (Val-d'Oise department), France. The station is served by Transilien H trains, on the line from Paris to Persan-Beaumont via Saint-Leu-la-Forêt. The annual number of passengers was 1,621,261 in 2024. Taverny is located on the line from Ermont-Eaubonne to Valmondois, that was opened in 1876. The line was electrified in 1970.

== Bus connections ==
- Val Parisis: 30.10, 95.03A and B
- Haut Val-d'Oise : 1353

== Gallery ==
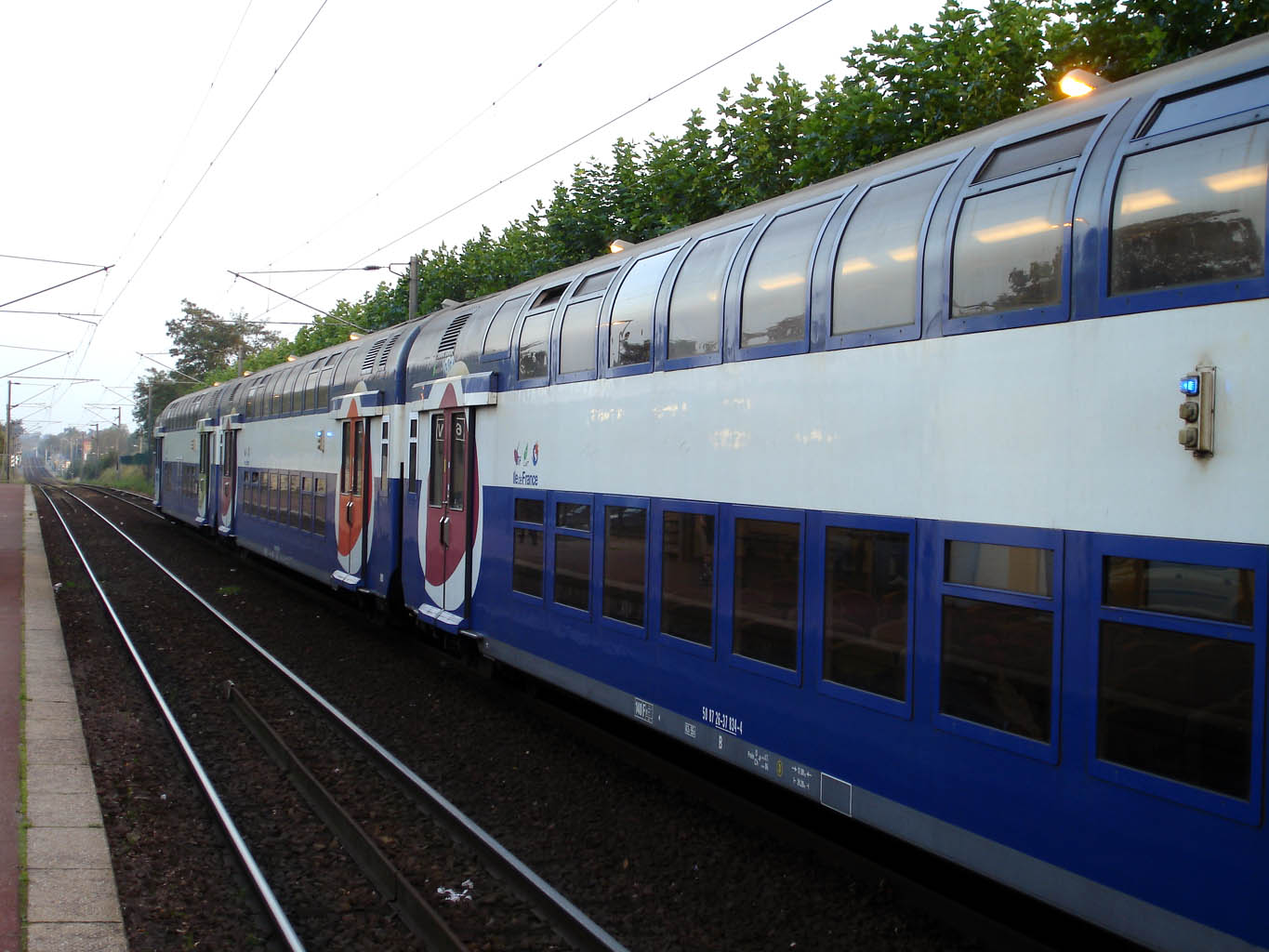

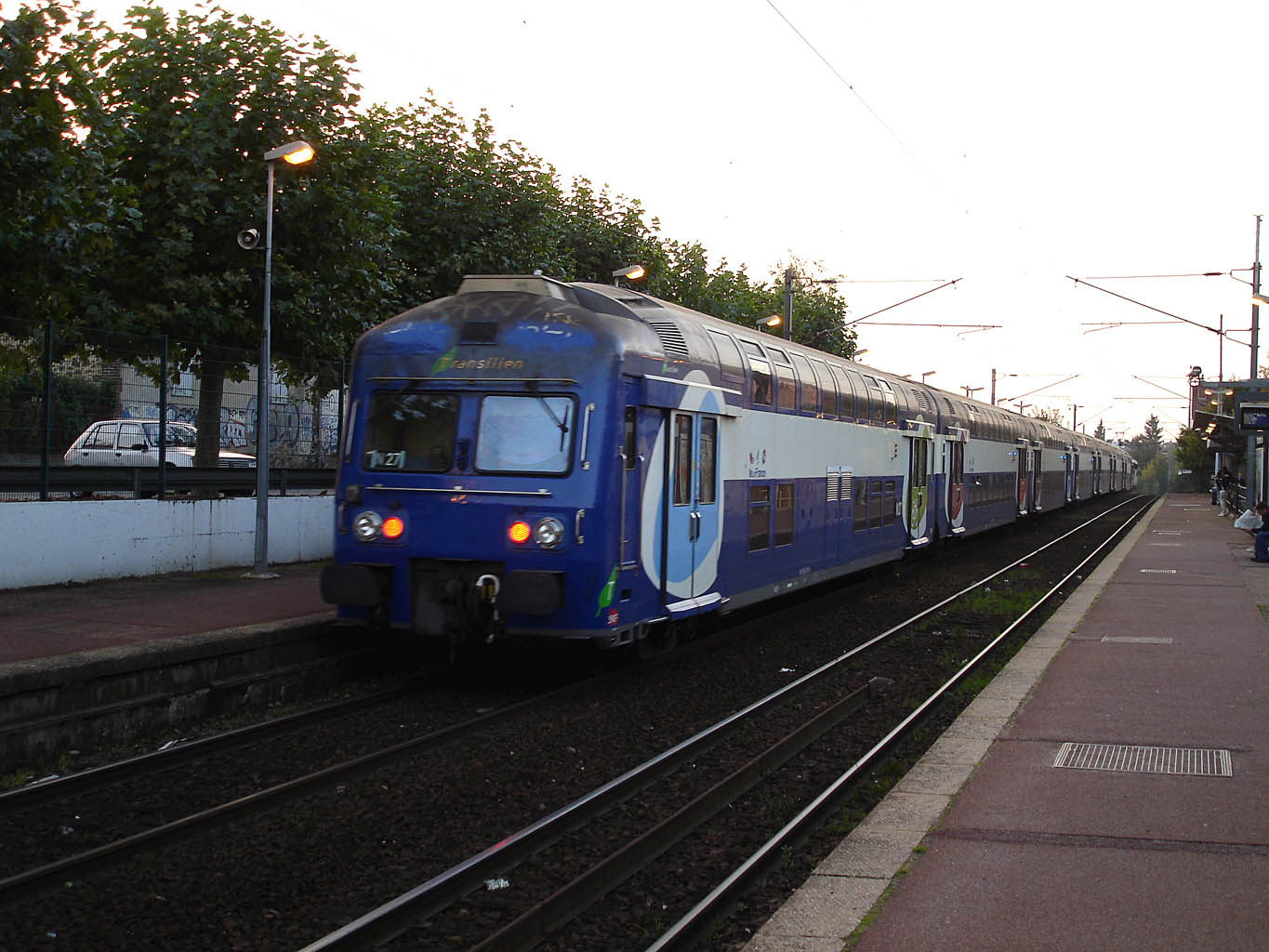

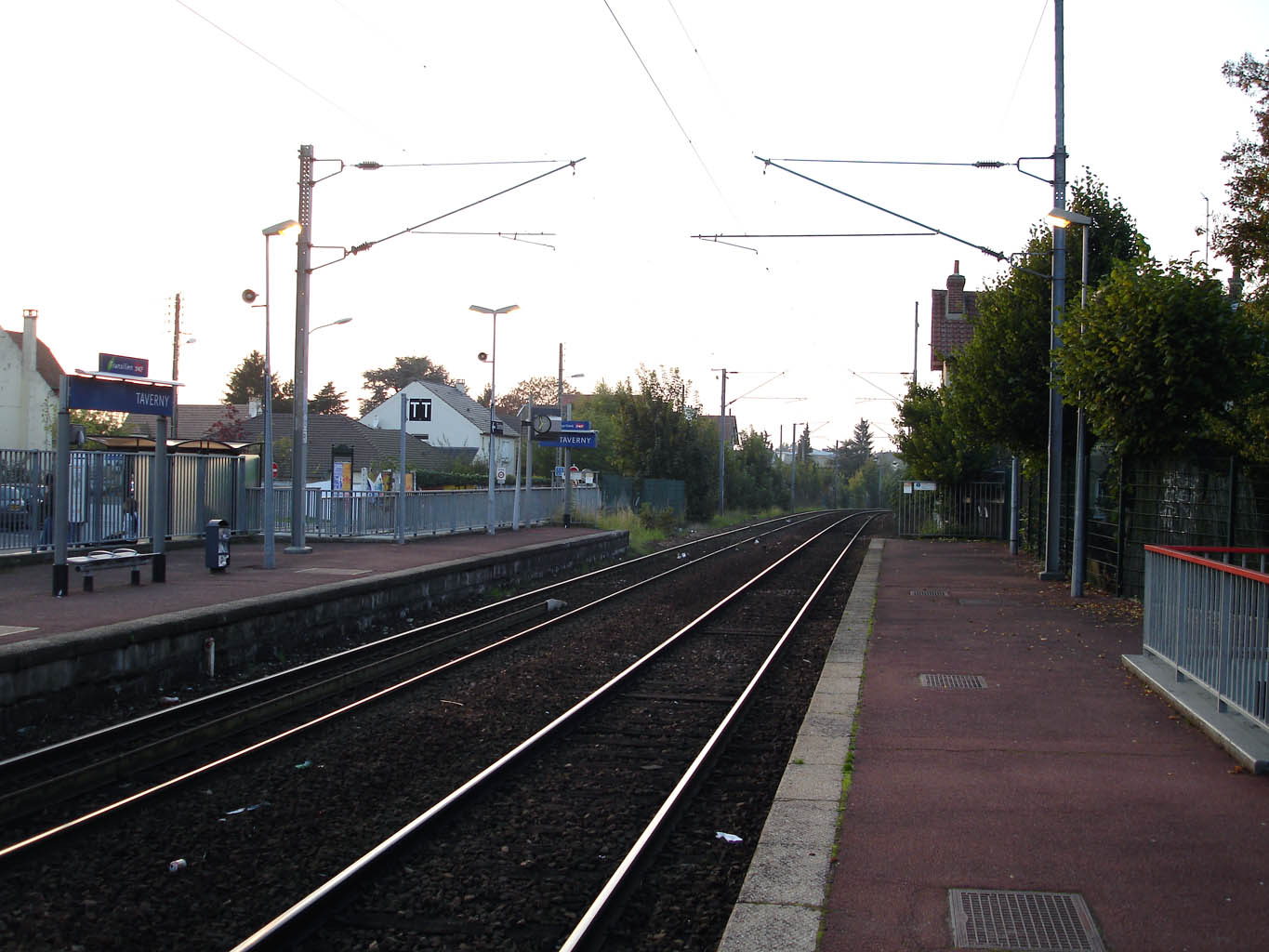
The station and its platform

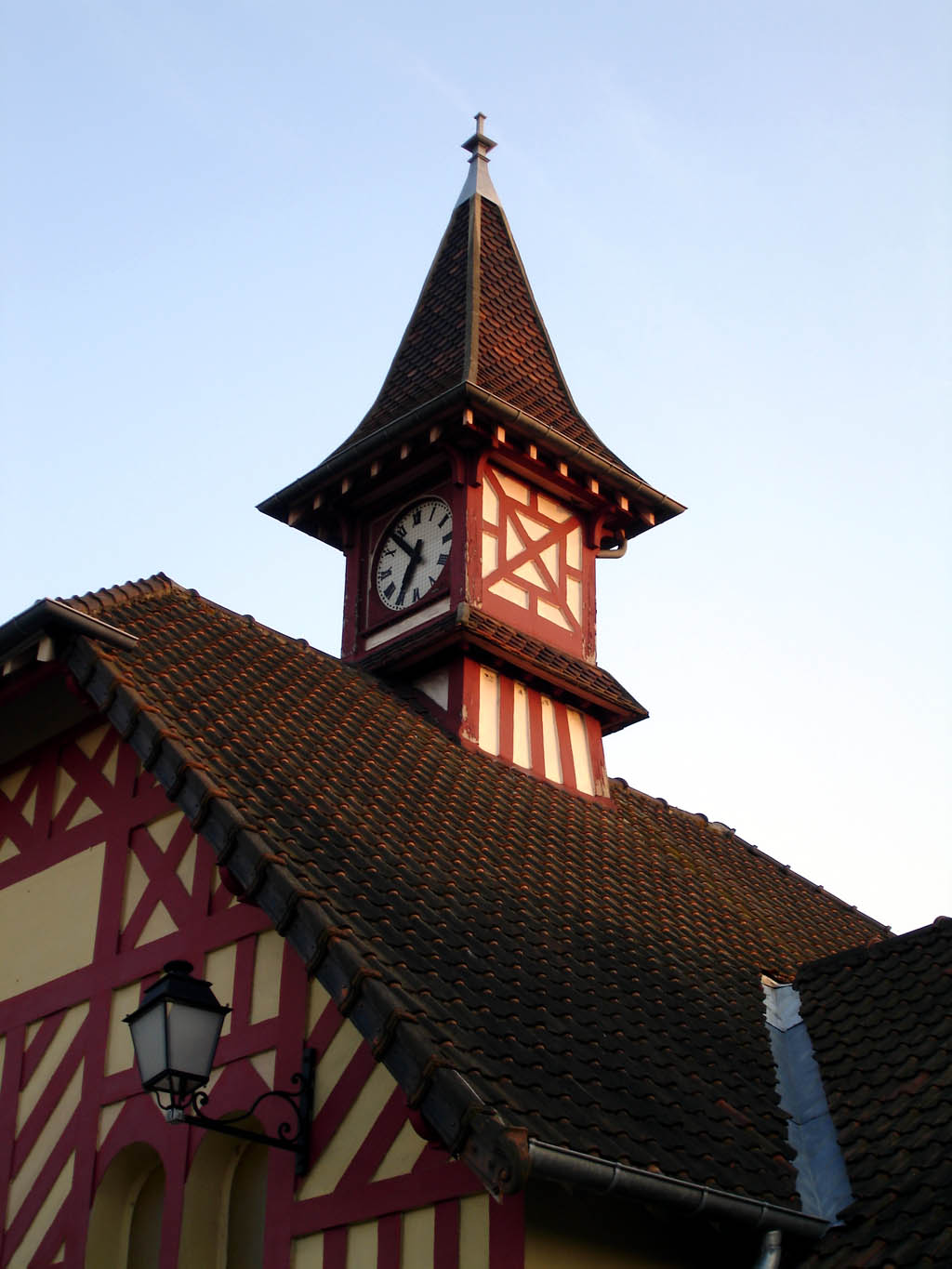
The clock tower on top of the station

== See also ==
- List of SNCF stations in Île-de-France
