= Vaucelles station =

Railway station in Taverny, France

Vaucelles

General information
- Location: Taverny, France
- Coordinates: 49°1′17″N 2°13′50″E
- Owner: SNCF
- Line: Ermont-Eaubonne–Valmondois railway
- Platforms: 2 platforms and 2 walkways

Other information
- Station code: 87276626

History
- Opened: 1876
- Electrified: 1970

Services
Preceding station	Transilien	Following station
Saint-Leu-la-Forêt towards Paris-Nord	Line H	Taverny towards Persan–Beaumont
Location

Vaucelles is a railway station located in the commune of Taverny (Val-d'Oise department), France. The station is served by Transilien H trains, on the line from Paris to Persan-Beaumont. The daily number of passengers was between 500 and 2,500 in 2002. Vaucelles is located on the line from Ermont-Eaubonne to Valmondois, that was opened in 1876. The line was electrified in 1970. The station was renovated in 2009.

== Gallery ==
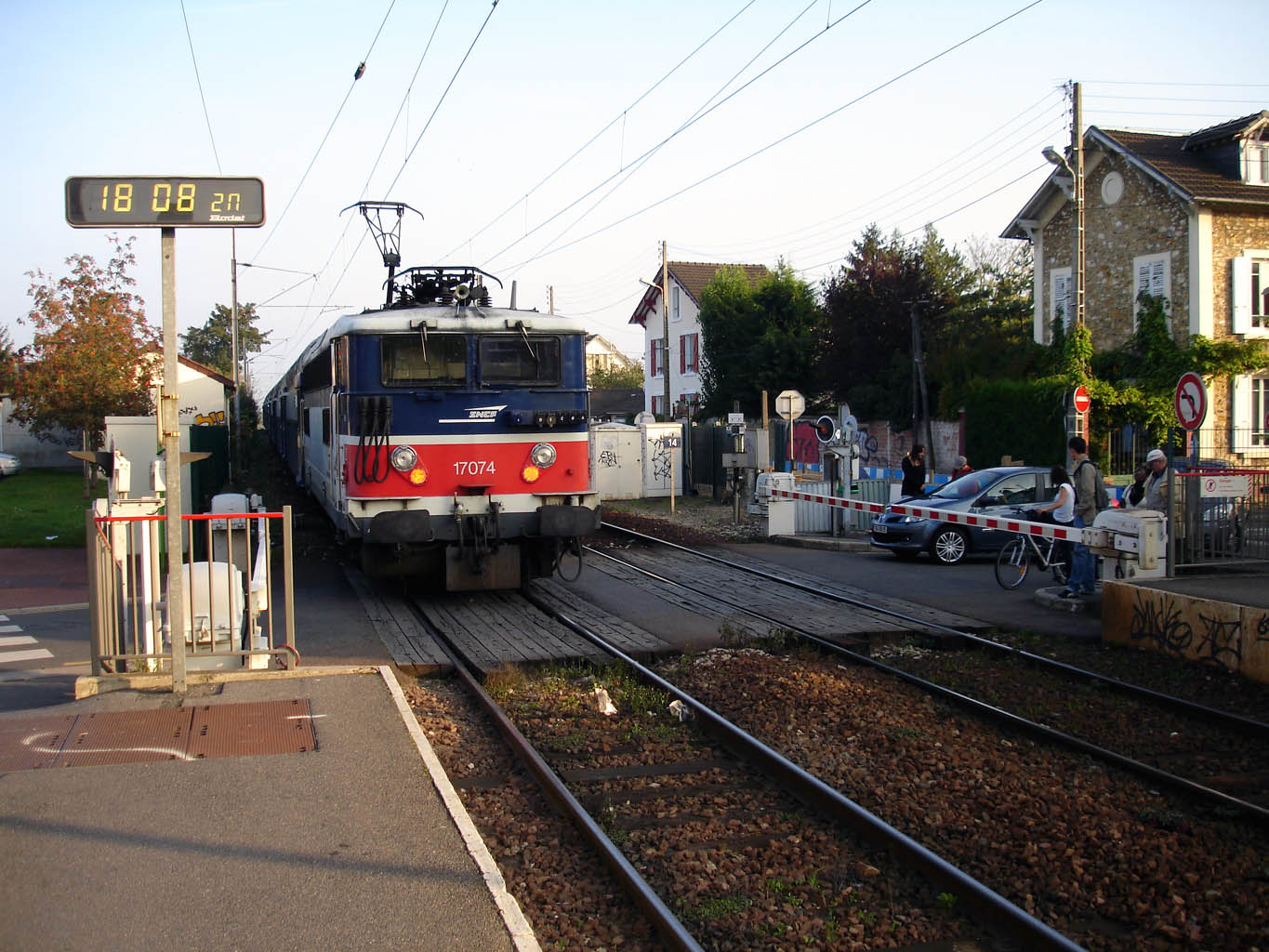
BB 17000 heading for Gare de Paris-Nord

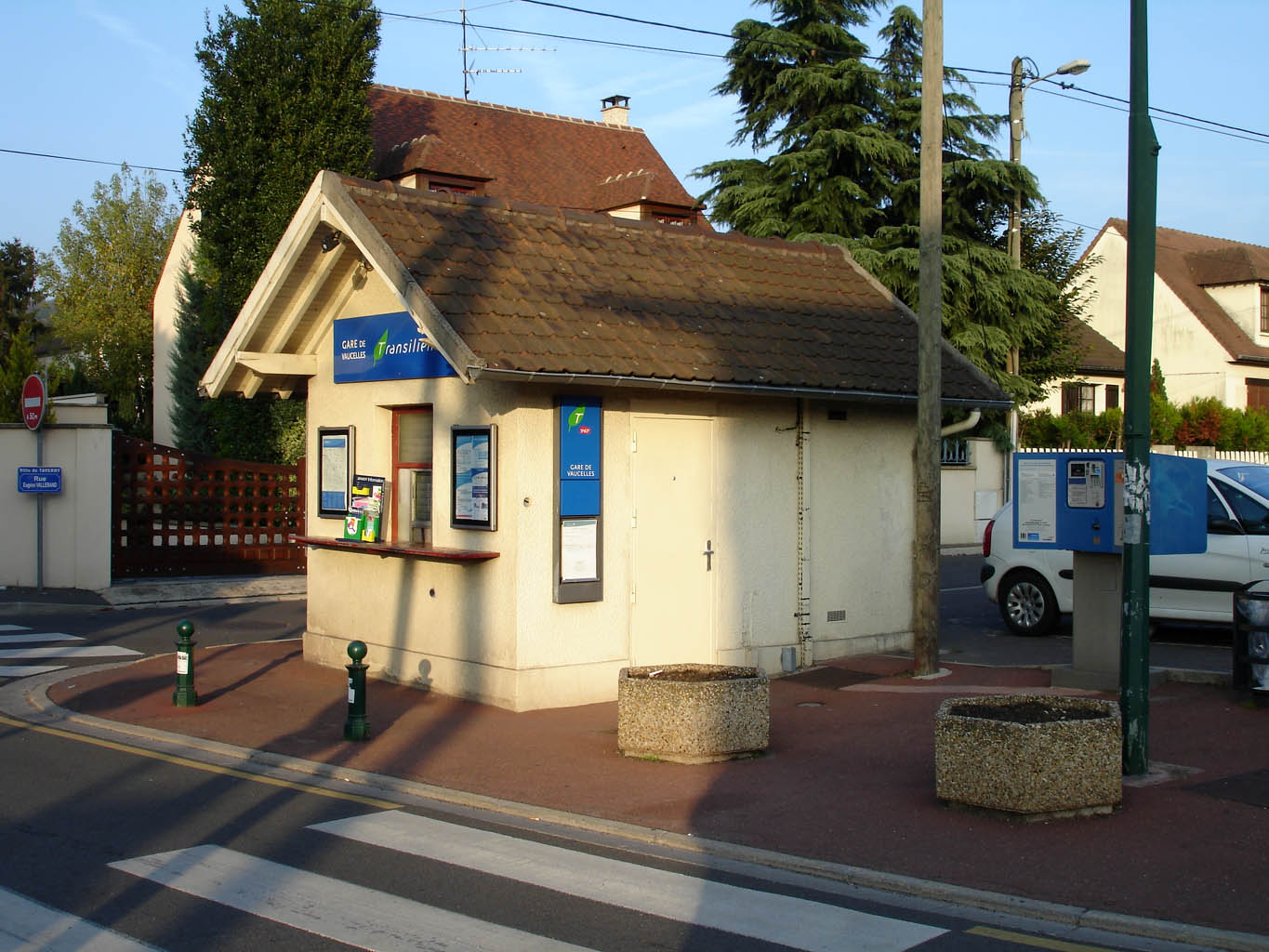
Bâtiment voyageurs de la gare

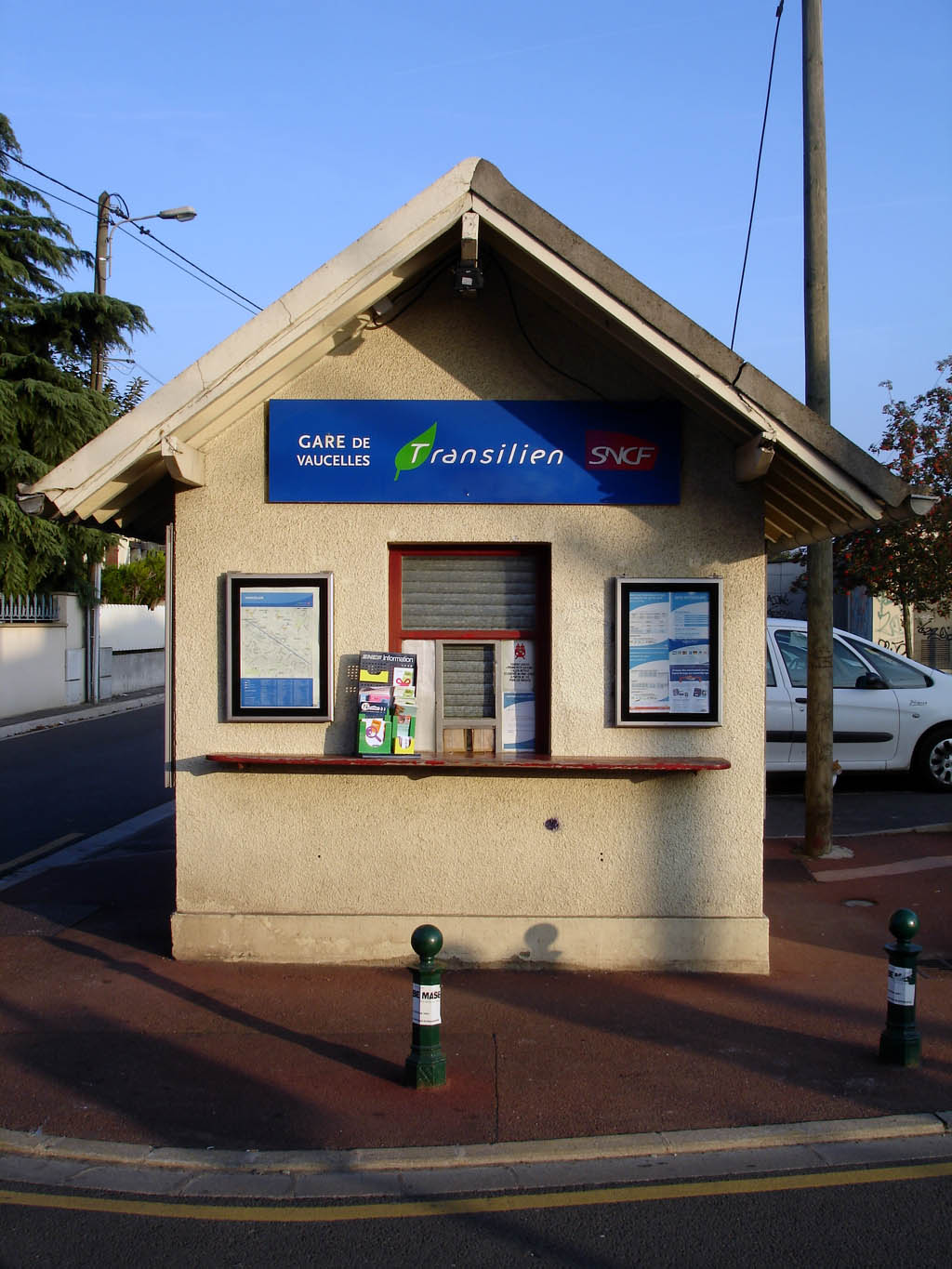
Bâtiment voyageurs de la gare

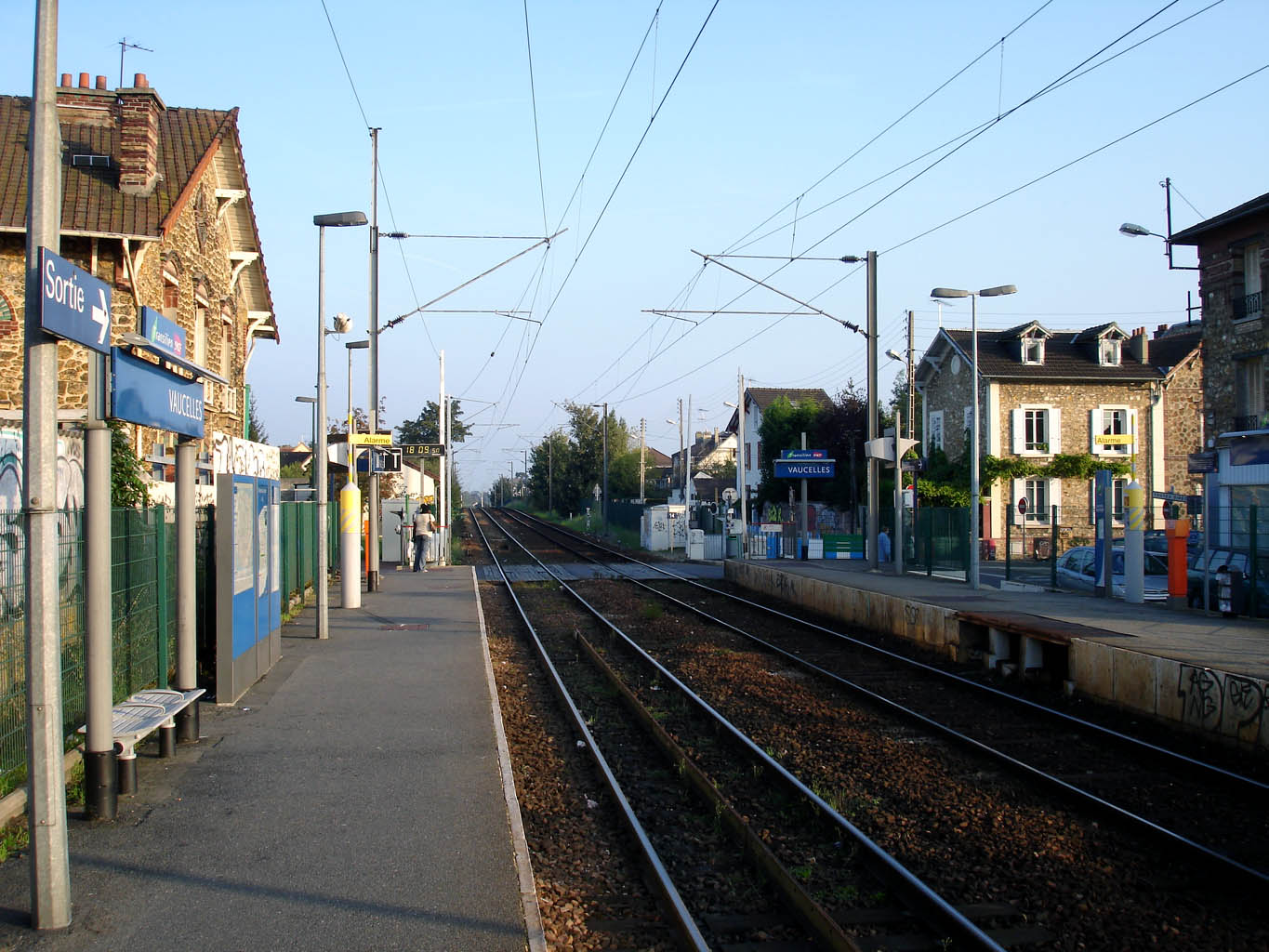
Quais de la gare

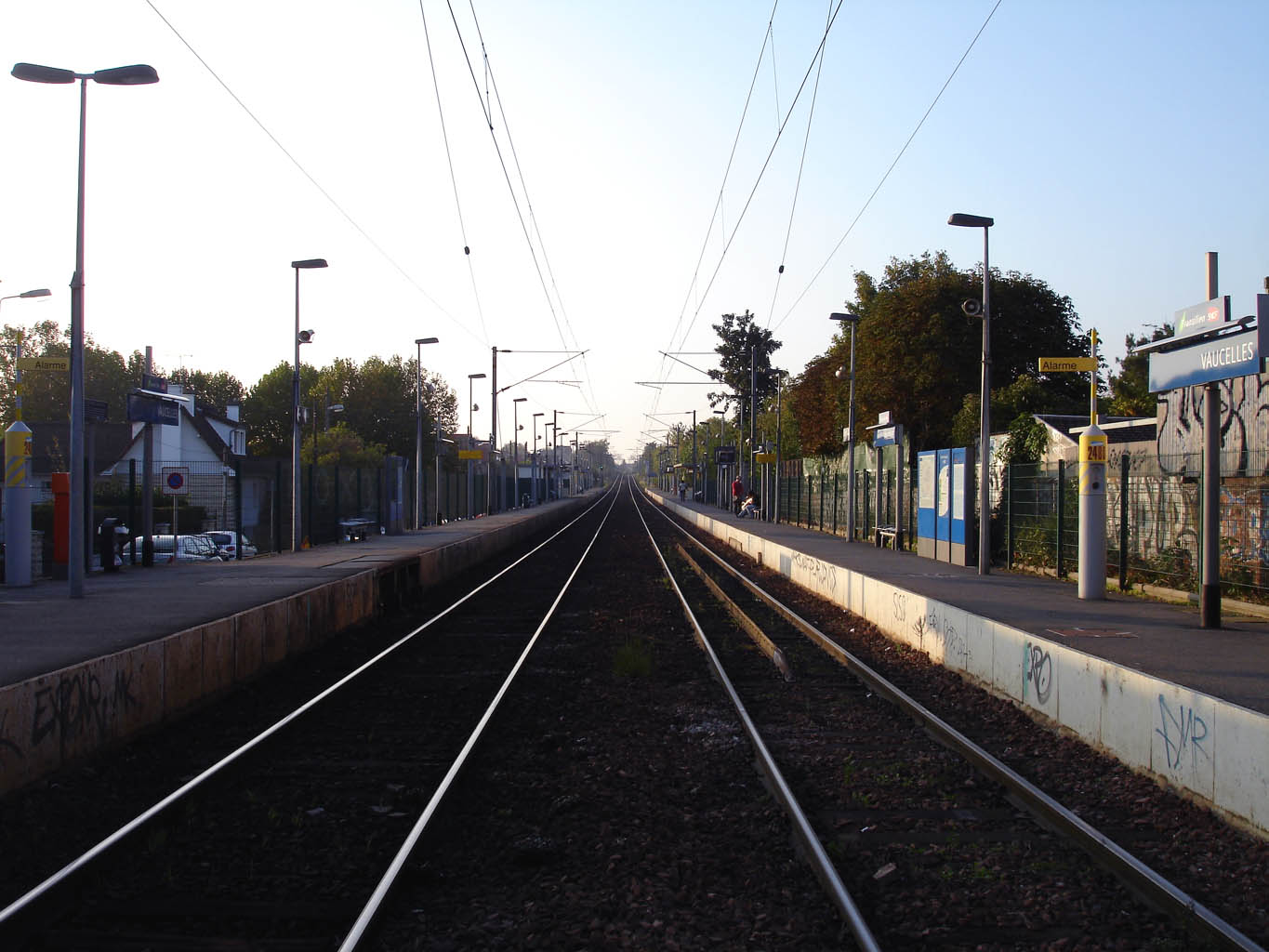
Quais de la gare

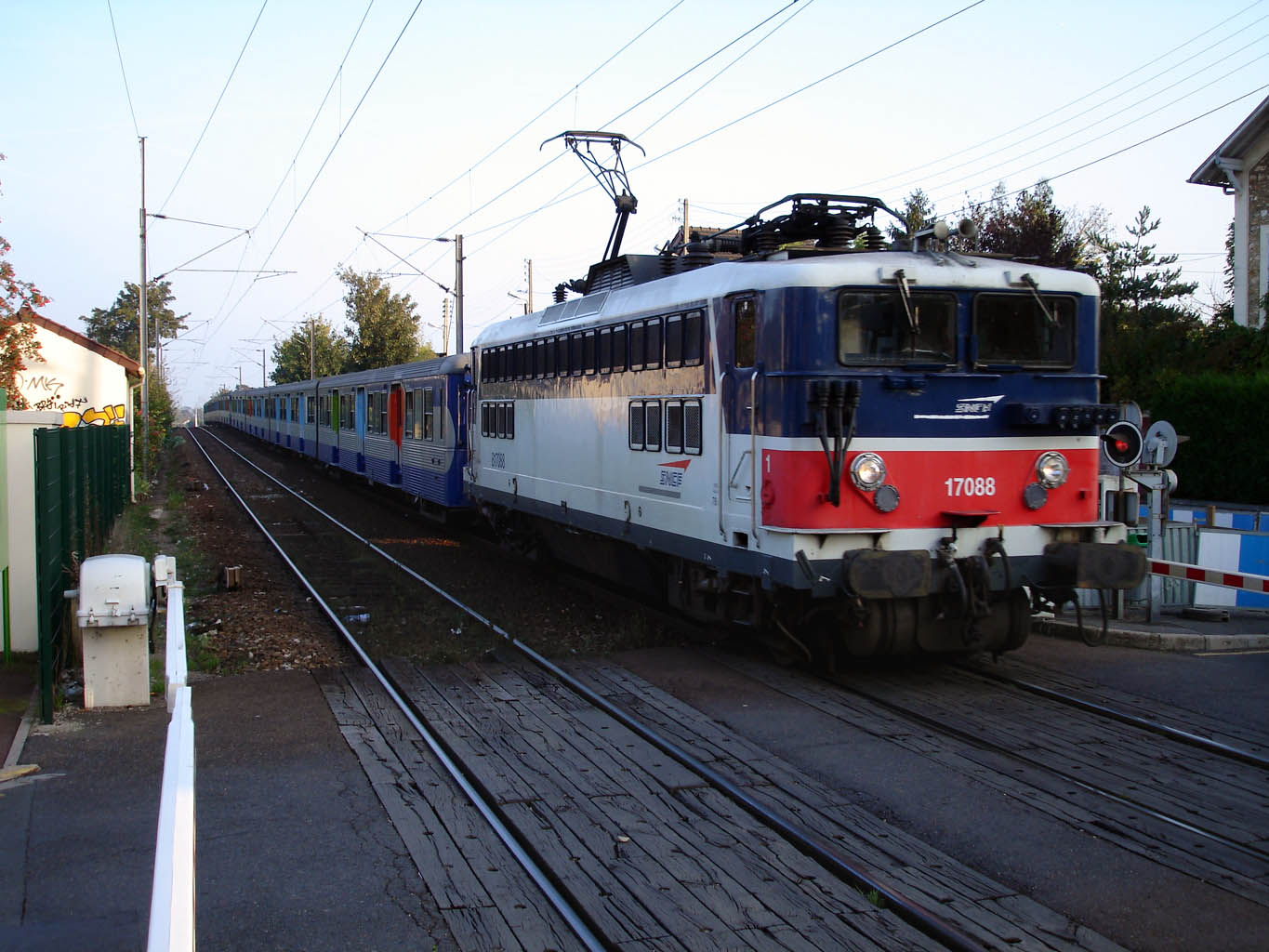
BB 17000 heading for Persan - Beaumont

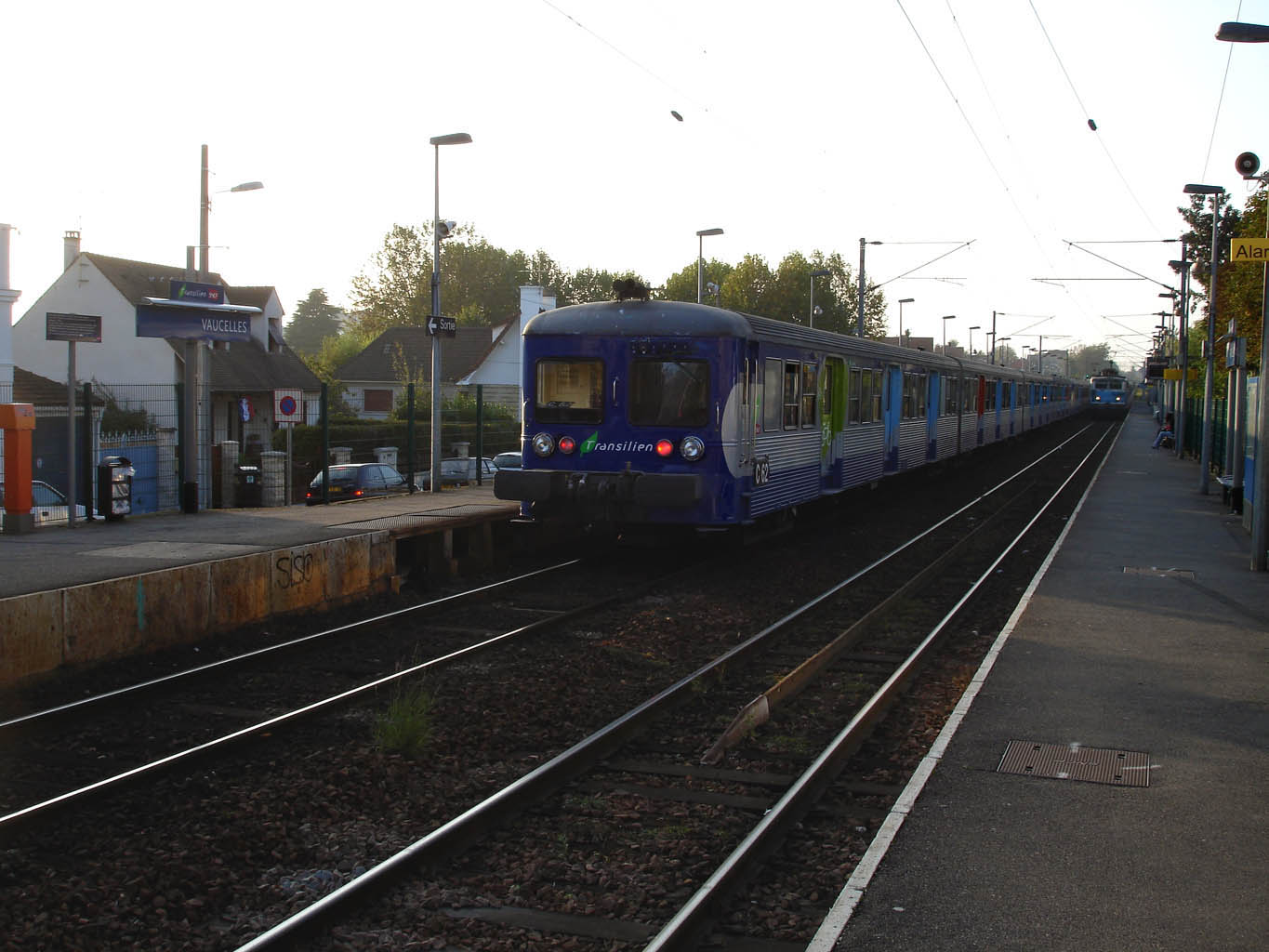
The train heading for Persan-Beaumont

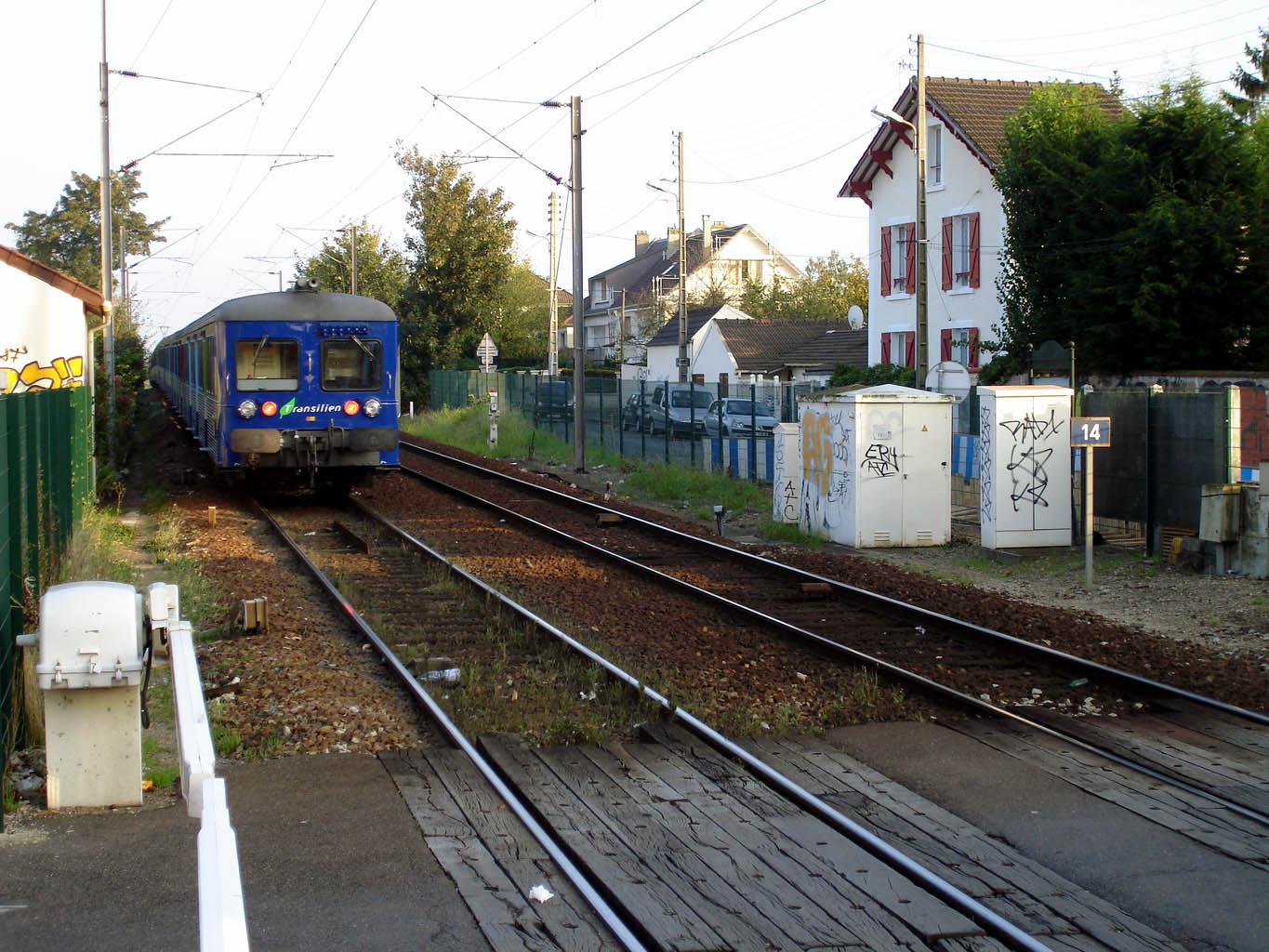
The train heading for Gare du Nord in Paris

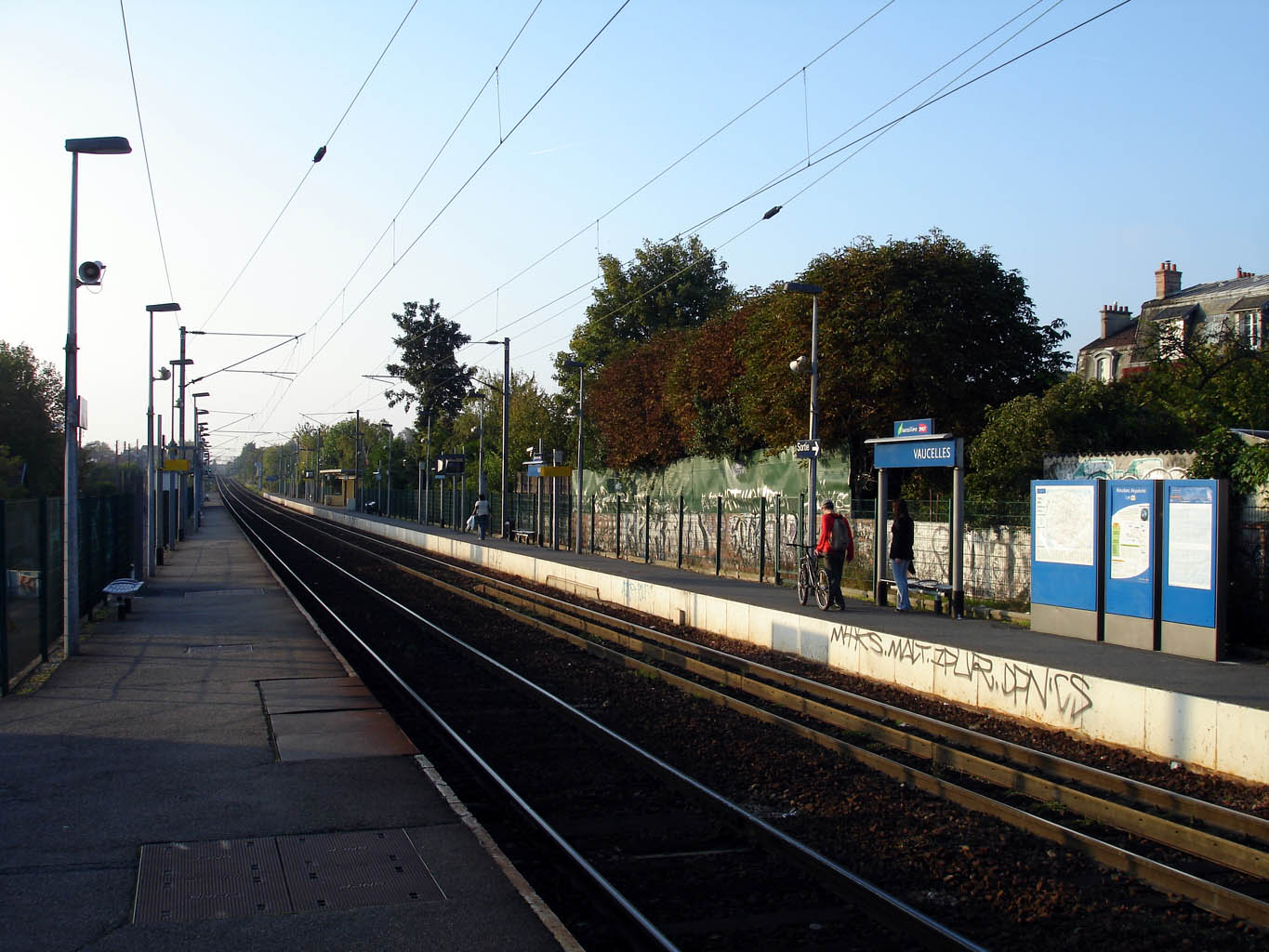
The station's platform

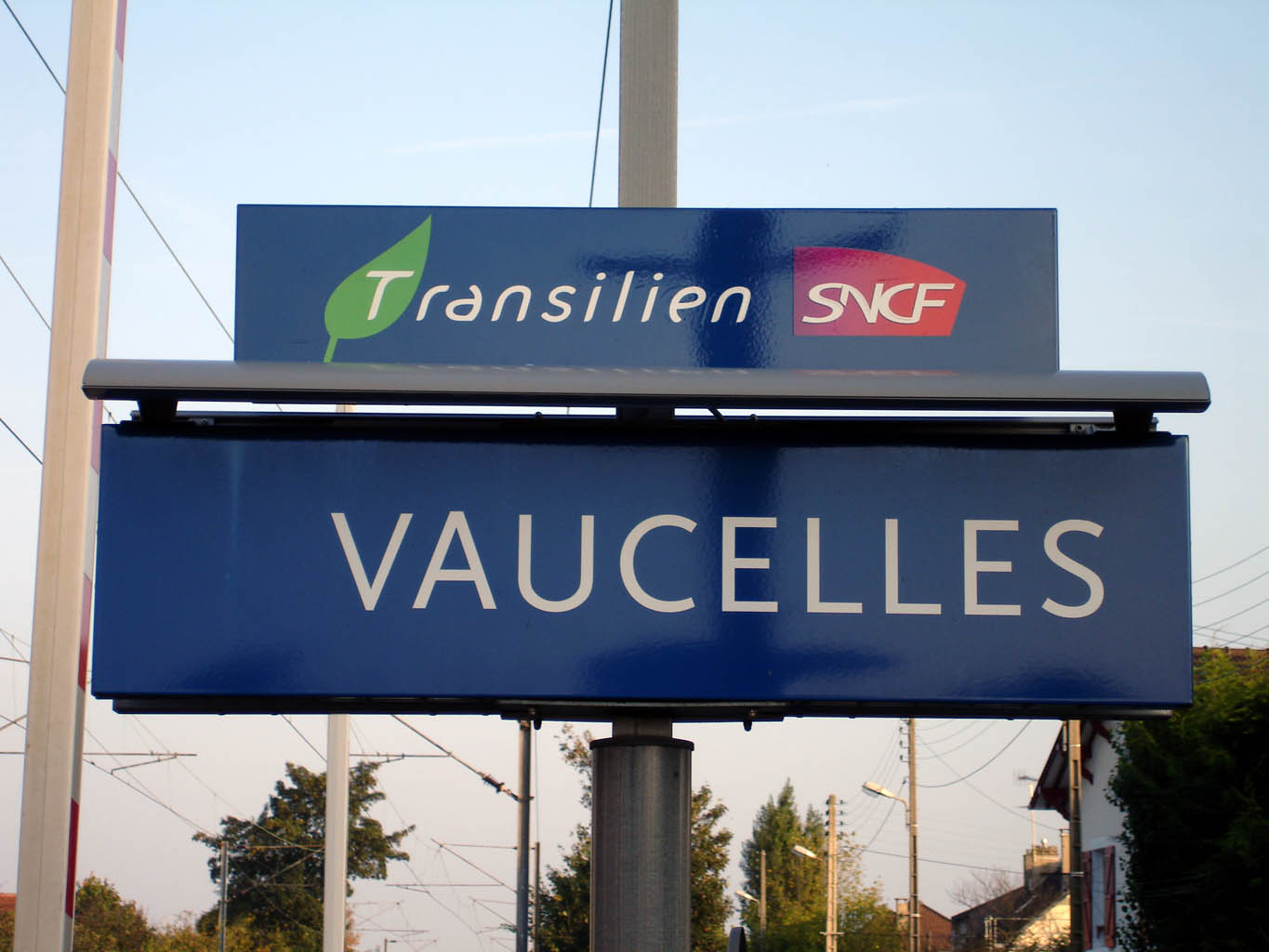
The station's sign

== See also ==
- List of SNCF stations in Île-de-France
