= Gros Noyer–Saint-Prix station =

Railway station in Ermont, France

Gros Noyer Saint-Prix
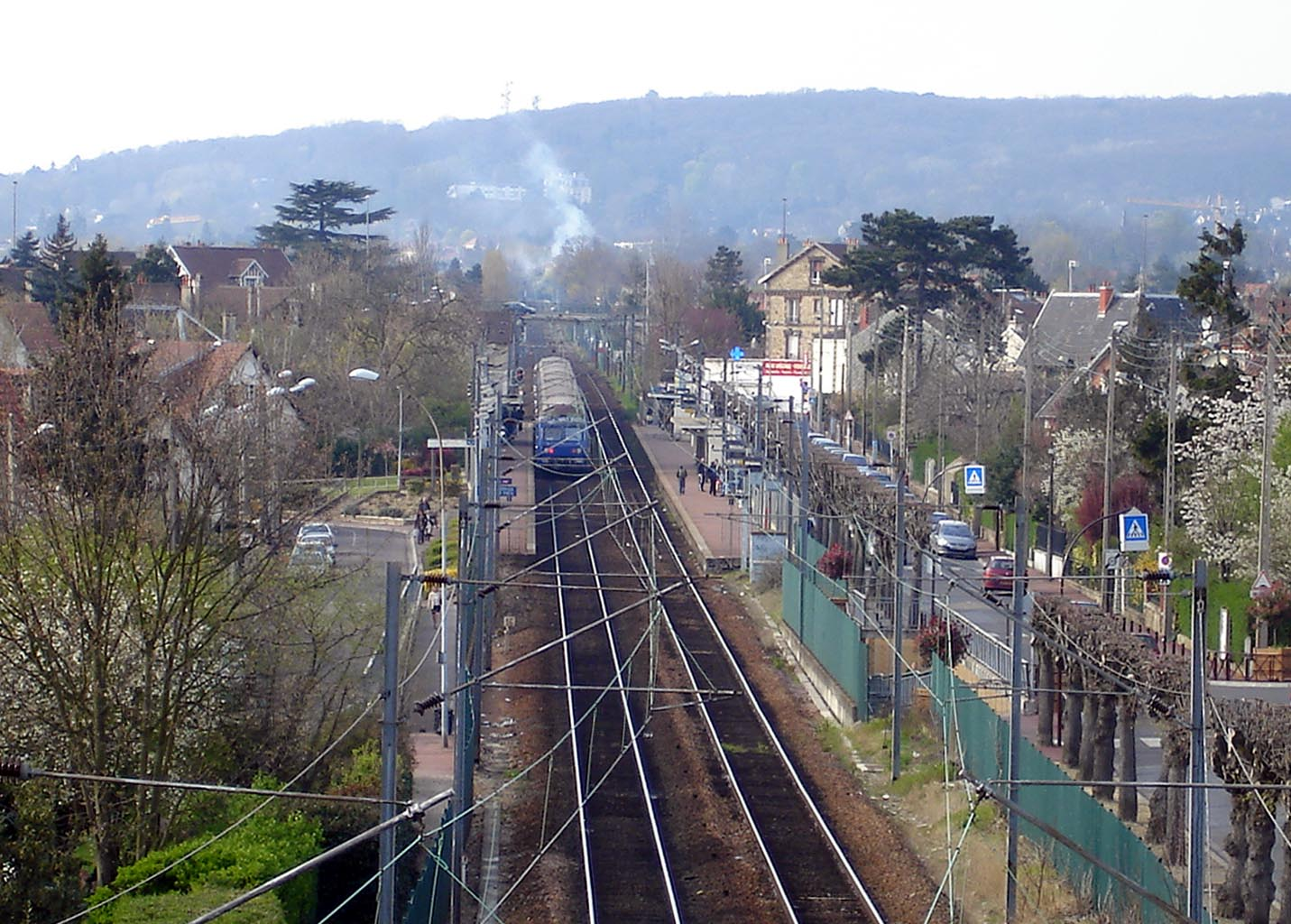

General information
- Location: Ermont, France
- Coordinates: 48°59′49″N 2°15′31″E
- Owner: SNCF
- Platforms: 2 platforms

Other information
- Station code: 87276592

History
- Opened: 1876
- Electrified: 1970

Passengers
- 2024: 1,819,054

Services
Preceding station	Transilien	Following station
Ermont-Halte towards Paris-Nord	Line H	Saint-Leu-la-Forêt towards Persan–Beaumont
Location

Gros Noyer–Saint-Prix (French pronunciation: [ɡʁo nwaje sɛ̃ pʁi]) is a railway station in the commune of Ermont (Val-d'Oise department), France. The station is served by Transilien H trains from Paris to Persan-Beaumont via Saint-Leu-la-Forêt. The daily number of passengers was between 2,500 and 7,500 in 2002. The station has 2 free parking lots with 20 and 150 places. Le Gros Noyer – Saint-Prix is located on the line from Ermont-Eaubonne to Valmondois, that was opened in 1876. The line was electrified in 1970.

== Bus connections ==
- Cars Rose: 38.03
- Nearby: Busval d'Oise: 95.03B

== Gallery ==
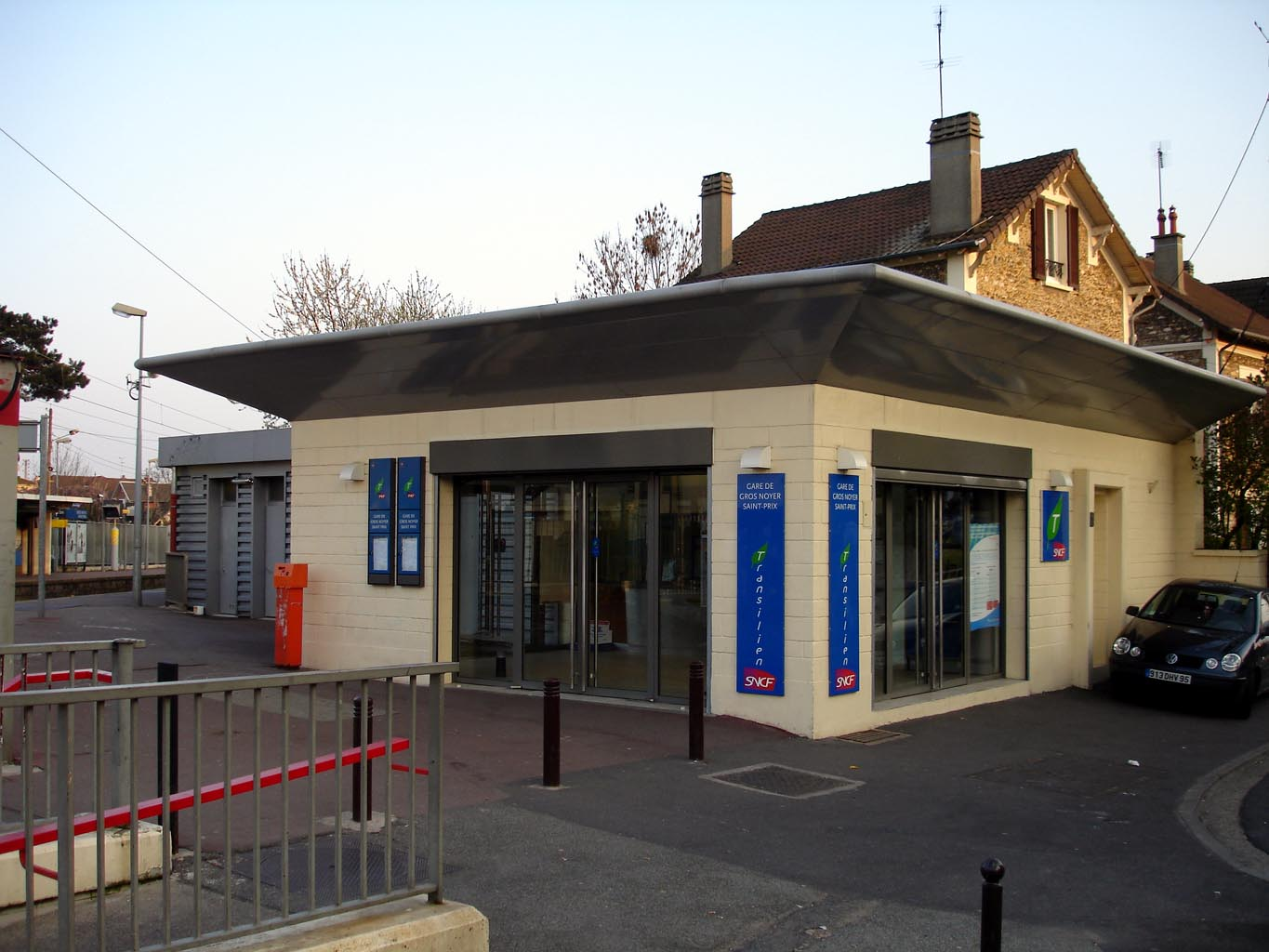
The station booth

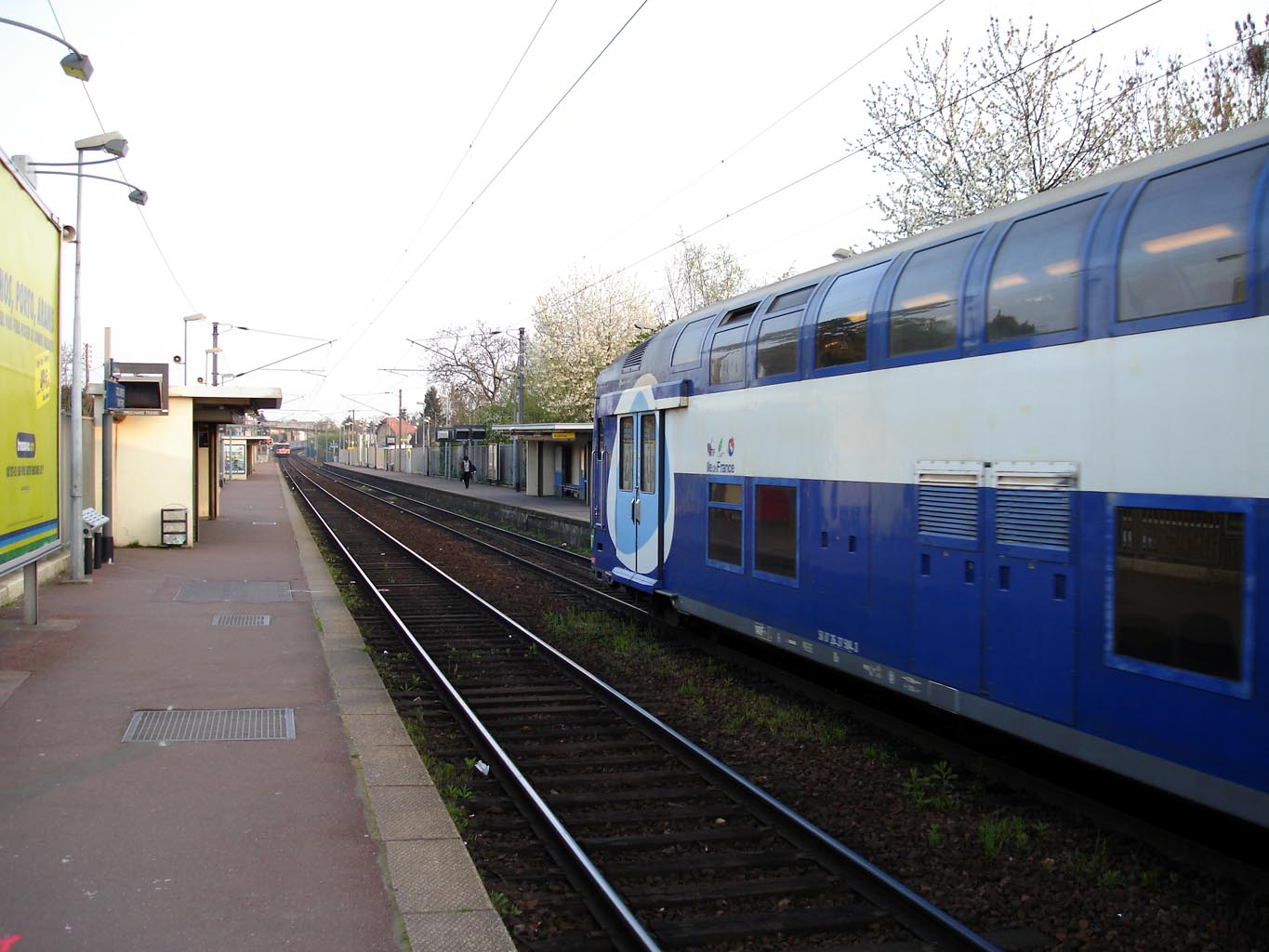
VB 2N heading for Persan - Beaumont

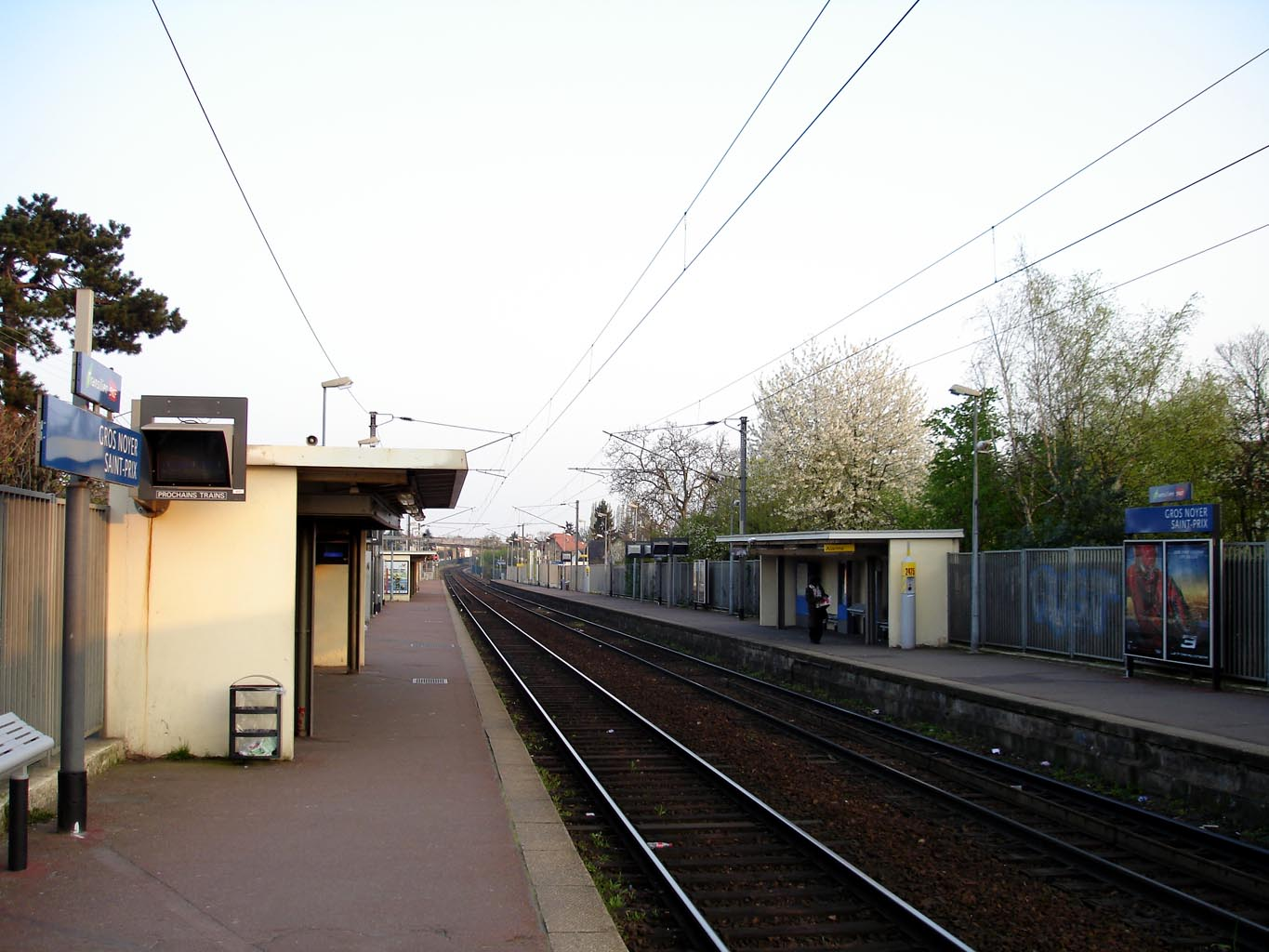
The station's platform

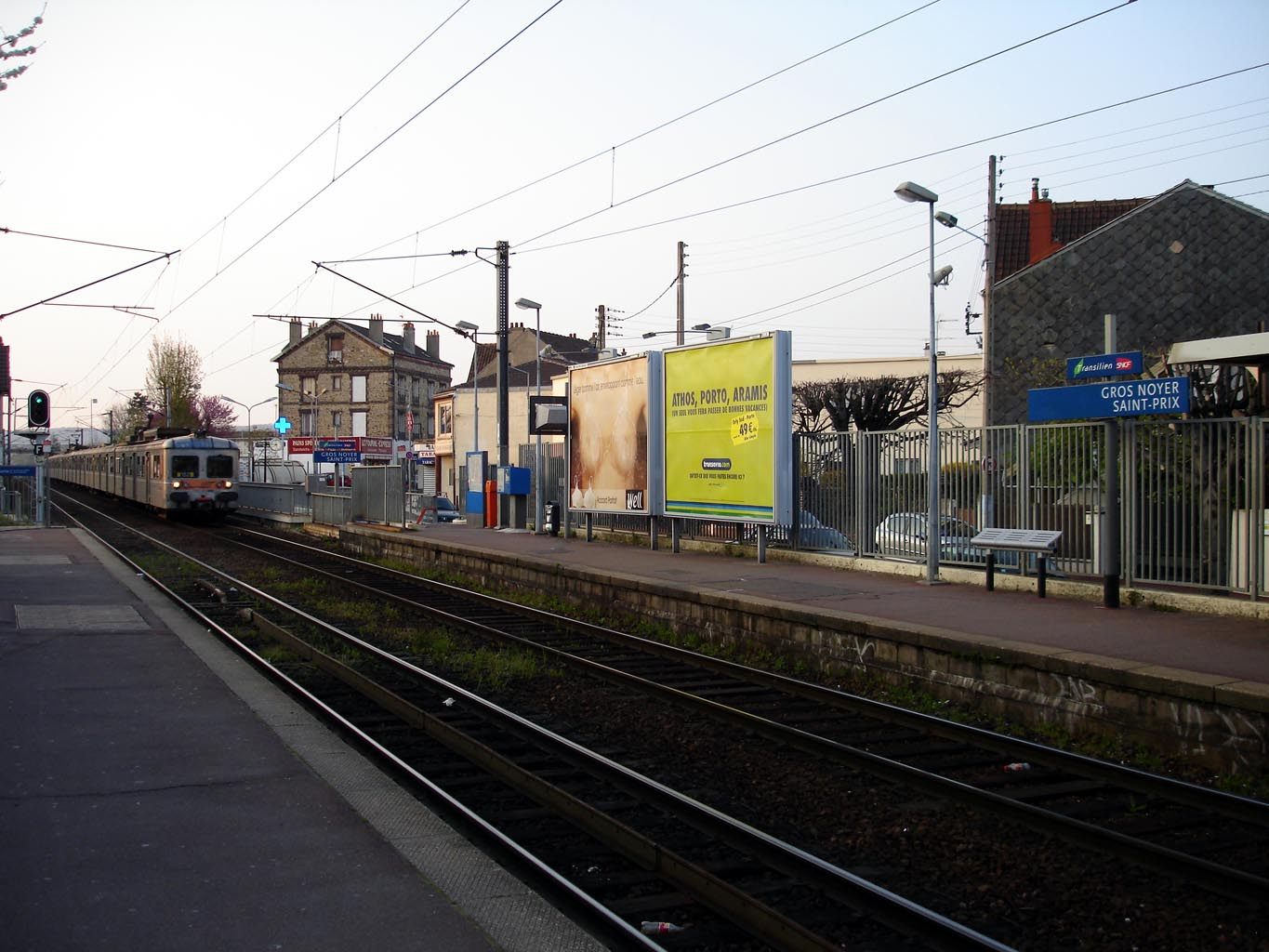
The Z 6100 entering the station

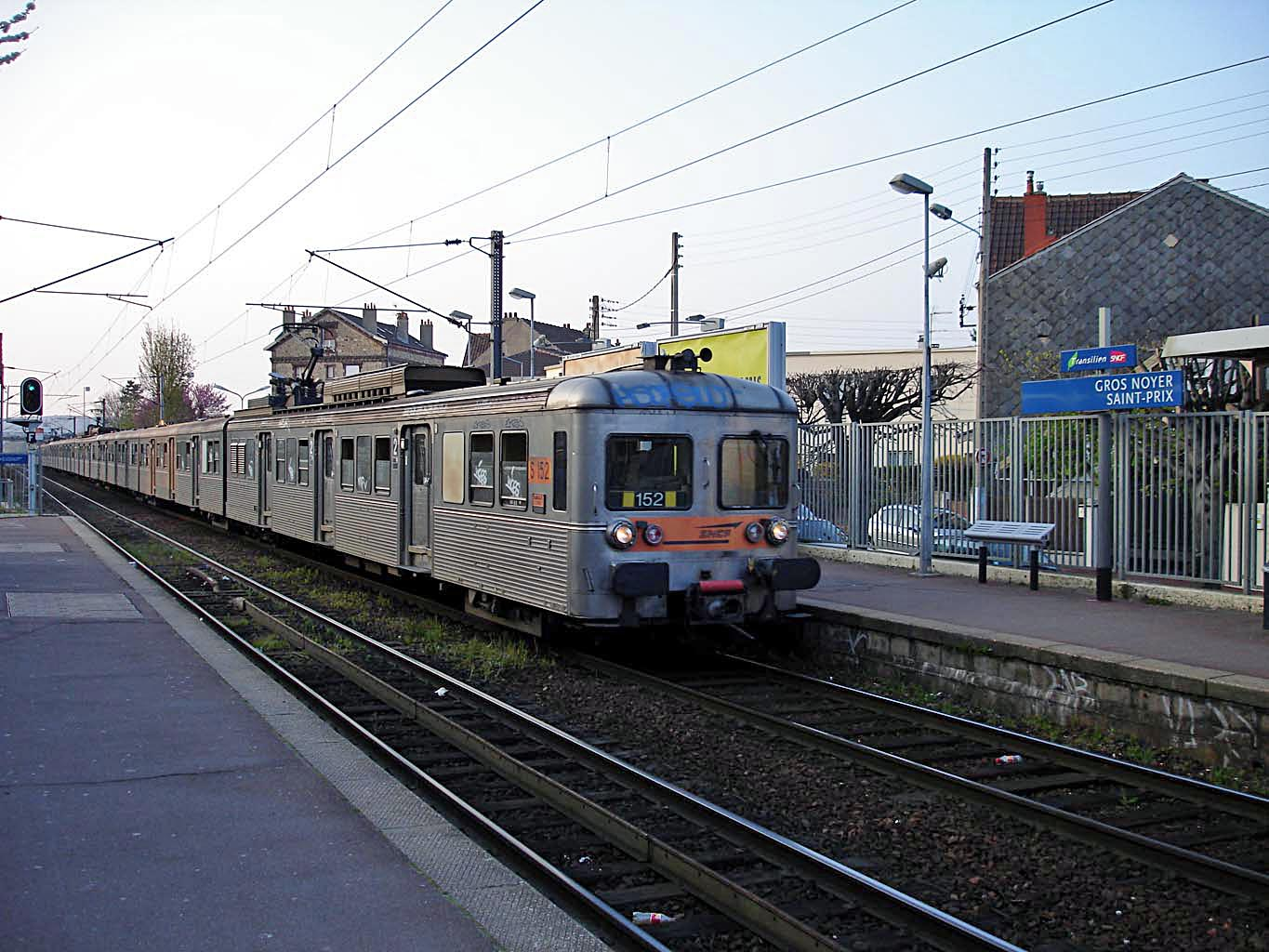
The Z 6100 leaving the station

== See also ==
- List of SNCF stations in Île-de-France
