= Saint-Leu-la-Forêt station =

Railway station in Saint-Leu-la-Forêt, France

Saint-Leu-la-Forêt
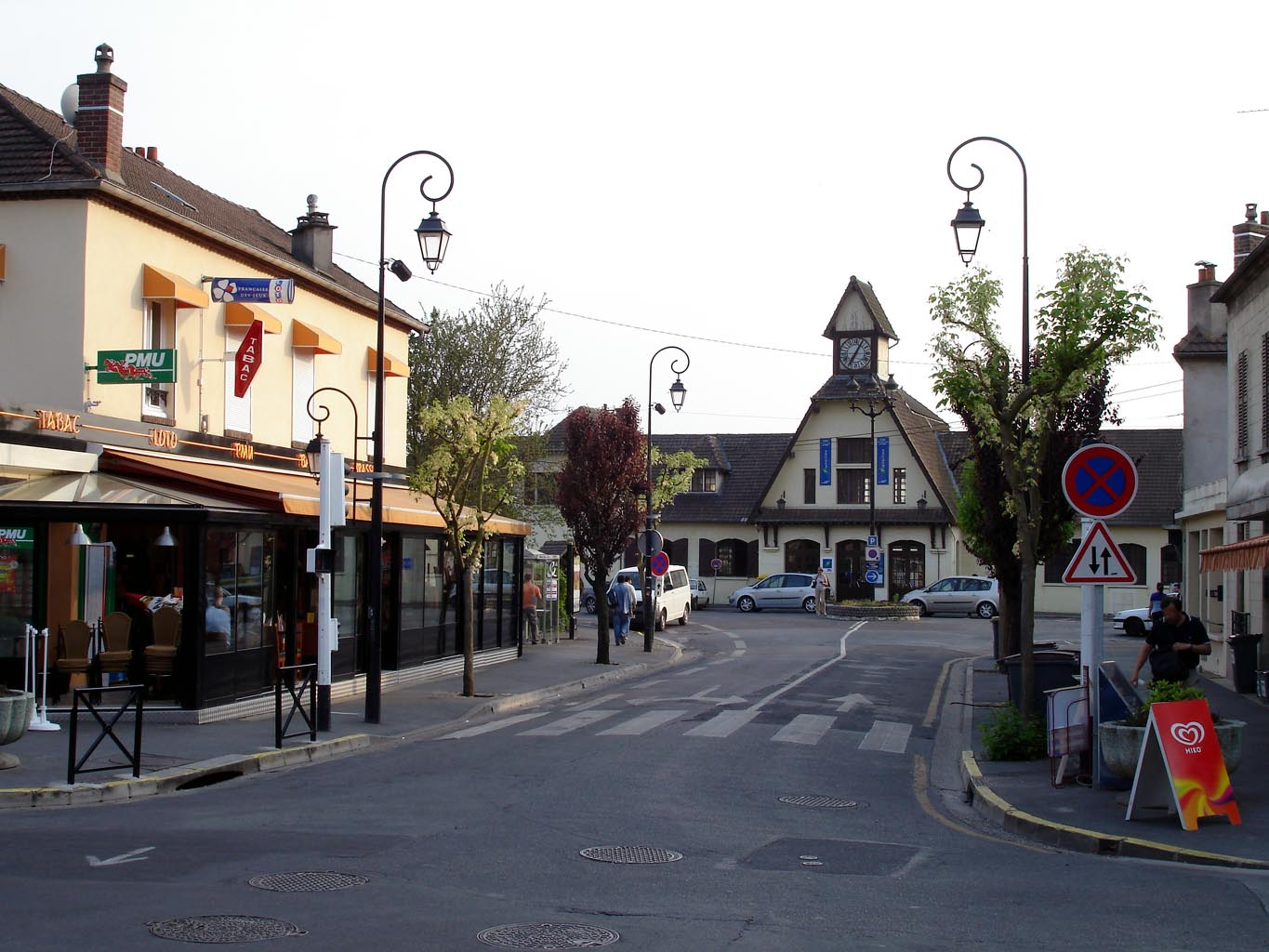

General information
- Location: Saint-Leu-la-Forêt, France
- Coordinates: 49°0′56″N 2°14′33″E
- Owner: SNCF
- Platforms: 1 side platform + 1 central platform

Other information
- Station code: 87276600

History
- Opened: 1876
- Electrified: 1970

Passengers
- 2024: 2,504,878

Services
Preceding station	Transilien	Following station
Gros Noyer–Saint-Prix towards Paris-Nord	Line H	Vaucelles towards Persan–Beaumont
Location

Saint-Leu-la-Forêt is a railway station located in the commune of Saint-Leu-la-Forêt (Val-d'Oise department), France. The station is served by Transilien H trains, on the line from Paris to Persan-Beaumont via Saint-Leu-la-Forêt. The daily number of passengers was between 2,500 and 7,500 in 2002. The station has 2 free parking lots with 118 and 168 places. Saint-Leu-la-Forêt is located on the line from Ermont-Eaubonne to Valmondois, that was opened in 1876. The line was electrified in 1970.

== Bus connections ==
- Valoise: 30.14 and 30.23

== See also ==
- List of SNCF stations in Île-de-France
