= Antony, Hauts-de-Seine =

Antony
- Subprefecture and commune
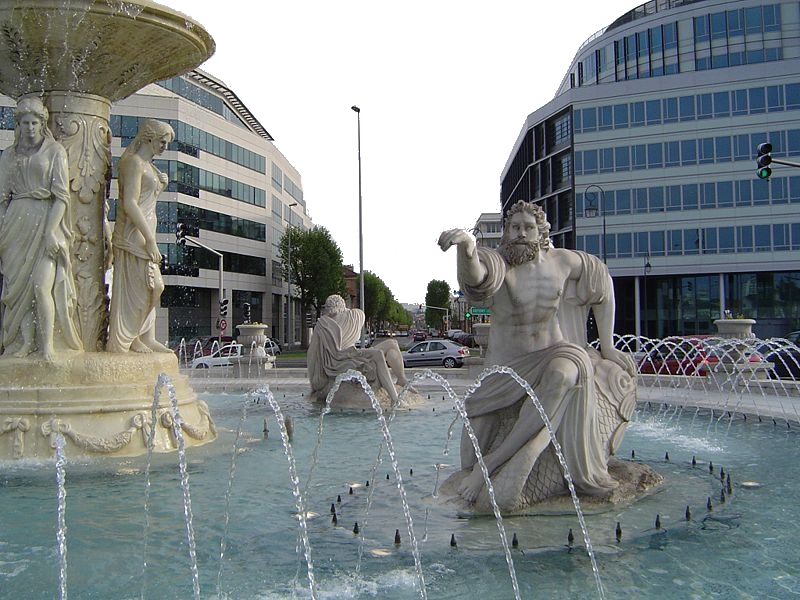
- The Croix de Berny fountain at the northern entrance to Antony

- Coat of arms

- Location (in red) within Paris inner suburbs
- Location of Antony
- Location within France Location within Île-de-France (region)
- Coordinates: 48°45′14″N 2°17′51″E
- Country: France
- Region: Île-de-France
- Department: Hauts-de-Seine
- Arrondissement: Antony
- Canton: Antony
- Intercommunality: Grand Paris

Government
  - Mayor (2026–32): Aude Nodé-Langlois
- Area^{1}: 9.56 km^{2} (3.69 sq mi)
- Elevation: 74 m (243 ft)
- Highest elevation: 100 m (330 ft)
- Lowest elevation: 48 m (157 ft)
- Population (2023): 64,263
  - Density: 6,720/km^{2} (17,400/sq mi)
- Time zone: UTC+01:00 (CET)
  - Summer (DST): UTC+02:00 (CEST)
- INSEE/Postal code: 92002 /92160
- ^{1} French Land Register data, which excludes lakes, ponds, glaciers > 1 km^{2} (0.386 sq mi or 247 acres) and river estuaries.

Logo of the city of Antony

Antony (French pronunciation: [ɑ̃tɔni]) is a commune in the southern suburbs of Paris, France, 11.3 km (7.0 mi) from the centre of Paris. Antony is a subprefecture of the Hauts-de-Seine department and the seat of the arrondissement of Antony.

Watered by the Bièvre, a tributary of the Seine, Antony is at the crossroads of important transport routes, especially the main north–south axis, which has existed for 2,000 years. Little urbanized until the early 20th century, the city grew considerably between the two wars, under Senator-Mayor Auguste Mounié, from 4,000 to 20,000 inhabitants. In the early 1960s the population quickly increased from 25,000 to 50,000 to accommodate repatriated people from Algeria. Now incorporated in the Paris Metropolitan Area, it is particularly strong in education, with one of the largest private institutions in France, and in health, with the largest private establishment in Île-de-France.

The commune has been awarded "two flowers" by the National Council of Towns and Villages in Bloom in the Competition for Cities and Villages in Bloom.

== Geography ==
=== Location ===
Antony is a city in the southern suburbs of Paris in the Hurepoix and is the chief town of the arrondissement of Hauts-de-Seine - 12.2 km south of Notre-Dame Cathedral. Its altitude is 48m above sea level at the lowest point at rue Gabriel Chamon in the Bièvre Valley and 100m at the highest point in the Avenue d'Estienne d'Orves on the border with Châtenay-Malabry. Antony is at the intersection of three departments:

- Essonne, with the communes of Verrières-le-Buisson to the west, Wissous to the east, and Massy to the south;
- Hauts-de-Seine, with the communes of Châtenay-Malabry to the west, Sceaux and Bourg-la-Reine to the north;
- Val-de-Marne, with the communes of Fresnes and L'Haÿ-les-Roses to the east

Antony is traversed by three rivers: the Bièvre River and its two tributaries, the Ruisseau des Godets and the Ruisseau de Rungis. One branch of the Bièvre upstream flows in the open through Heller Park in an area where the Bièvre is maintained by the Inter-communal association for development of the Bièvre Valley. From there it has been channeled and covered since the decision of the municipal council on 26 October 1950 nearly all the way to Paris. It then becomes part of the network of the Inter-departmental association for sanitation of the Paris agglomeration. Since the early 2000s, the restoration of the open air to the Bièvre at Antony and downstream has been envisaged. In 2003 this was done to Fresnes at the Pars des Prés on the edge of the La Fontaine district of Antony.

Antony is bisected by the South Parisian Green corridor which forms a portion of the via Turonensis: one of four paths in France for the pilgrimage to Saint Jacques de Compostela.

=== Geology and terrain ===
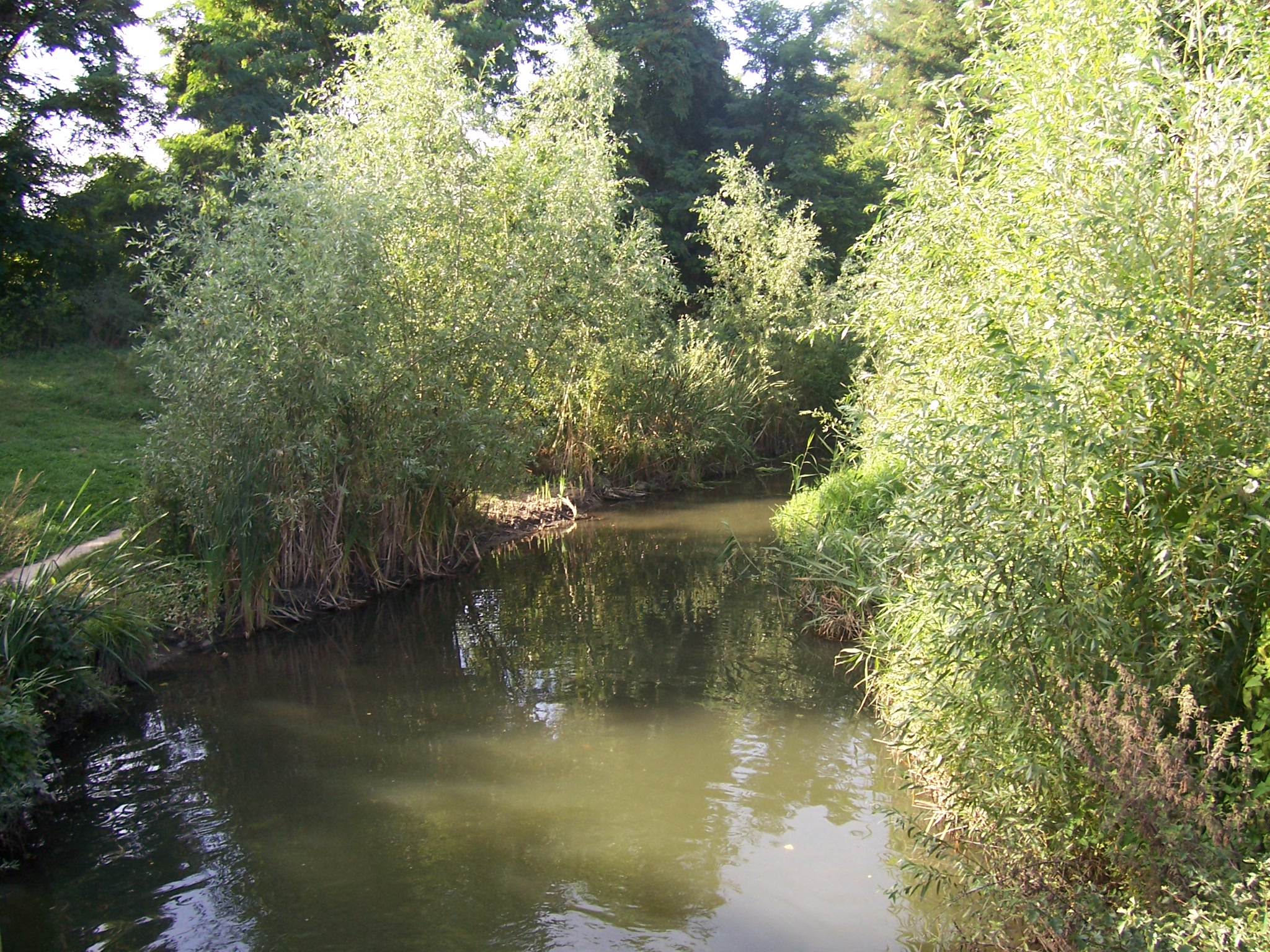
The Bièvre at the Parc des prés at Fresnes

The commune area is 956 hectares (2,362 acres) with the altitude varying between 45 and 103 m (148 and 338 ft).

The plateaux of Beauce ends in the north in an area crossed by small tributaries of the Seine. Antony is located in the extreme north-east of this area, called Hurepoix.

The crust of limestone of Beauce ends with a ledge at the edge of the Bois de Verrières. It covers a thick impermeable layer about 50 m (160 ft) thick of sand mixed with marl from Fontainebleau which is itself resting on layers of green marl in which there are some areas of gypsum then finally blue marl forming the bottom of the Bièvre valley. These green and blue marls form a completely waterproof layer about 10 m (33 ft) thick. These set the date of these layers to the Tertiary period when the sea occupying the centre of the Paris Basin began to retreat.

The old village of Antony is located on the green marl at the edge of the outcrop of the water table. It was in the gypsum layer that, in Antony in 1807, Georges Cuvier discovered the fossils of an extinct animal, one of the first to be scientifically recognized - in 1796 Cuvier had been one of first to argue species could become extinct. Naming it Anoplotherium commune, he described a mammalian ungulate herbivore with a long tail and the stature of a donkey or horse that lived 30 million years ago in the Late Eocene to the earliest Oligocene.

=== Climate ===
Antony climate type is of degraded oceanic. The most commonly used meteorological observation stations for Antony are those at Orly and at the airport of Vélizy-Villacoublay, both being communes located near Antony. The climate in the departments of the inner suburbs of Paris is characterized by sunshine and relatively low rainfall. The following table compares the climate of the city of Antony with that of some large French cities:

Comparison of local Meteorological data with other cities in France
| Town | Sunshine (hours/yr) | Rain (mm/yr) | Snow (days/yr) | Storm (days/yr) | Fog (days/yr) |
|---|---|---|---|---|---|
| National average | 1,973 | 770 | 14 | 22 | 40 |
| Antony | 1,656 | 673 | 18 | 22 | 48 |
| Paris | 1,661 | 637 | 12 | 18 | 10 |
| Nice | 2,724 | 767 | 1 | 29 | 1 |
| Strasbourg | 1,693 | 665 | 29 | 29 | 56 |
| Brest | 1,605 | 1,211 | 7 | 12 | 75 |

Climate data for Villacoublay
| Month | Jan | Feb | Mar | Apr | May | Jun | Jul | Aug | Sep | Oct | Nov | Dec | Year |
|---|---|---|---|---|---|---|---|---|---|---|---|---|---|
| Mean daily maximum °C (°F) | 6.2 (43.2) | 7.2 (45.0) | 11.0 (51.8) | 14.3 (57.7) | 18.3 (64.9) | 21.5 (70.7) | 24.0 (75.2) | 23.9 (75.0) | 20.1 (68.2) | 15.3 (59.5) | 9.8 (49.6) | 6.5 (43.7) | 14.8 (58.6) |
| Daily mean °C (°F) | 3.8 (38.8) | 4.4 (39.9) | 7.5 (45.5) | 10.1 (50.2) | 13.9 (57.0) | 17.0 (62.6) | 19.2 (66.6) | 19.1 (66.4) | 15.8 (60.4) | 11.9 (53.4) | 7.1 (44.8) | 4.3 (39.7) | 11.2 (52.2) |
| Mean daily minimum °C (°F) | 1.4 (34.5) | 1.5 (34.7) | 3.9 (39.0) | 5.9 (42.6) | 9.5 (49.1) | 12.4 (54.3) | 14.4 (57.9) | 14.3 (57.7) | 11.5 (52.7) | 8.5 (47.3) | 4.4 (39.9) | 2.1 (35.8) | 7.5 (45.5) |
| Average precipitation mm (inches) | 56.7 (2.23) | 48.5 (1.91) | 50.6 (1.99) | 52.9 (2.08) | 61.9 (2.44) | 51.7 (2.04) | 63.4 (2.50) | 55.2 (2.17) | 50.7 (2.00) | 65.2 (2.57) | 54.1 (2.13) | 61.8 (2.43) | 672.7 (26.48) |
| Average precipitation days (≥ 1 mm) | 11.0 | 10.2 | 10.6 | 9.9 | 10.2 | 8.5 | 8.0 | 7.3 | 7.9 | 10.3 | 10.6 | 11.5 | 116.0 |
| Mean monthly sunshine hours | 62 | 77 | 127 | 165 | 195 | 209 | 216 | 210 | 167 | 112 | 65 | 51 | 1,656 |
Source: Meteorological data for Villacoublay - 174m altitude, from 1981 to 2010 January 2015 (in French)

The issue of flooding in some districts of Antony and Fresnes, following clogging of water networks (i.e. stormwater, wastewater and the Bièvre) during violent storms (1982, 2001, 2008) returns periodically although a protection plan against flooding was made, either by the prefect or the mayor, in August 2006.

=== Channels of communication and transport ===
==== Roads ====
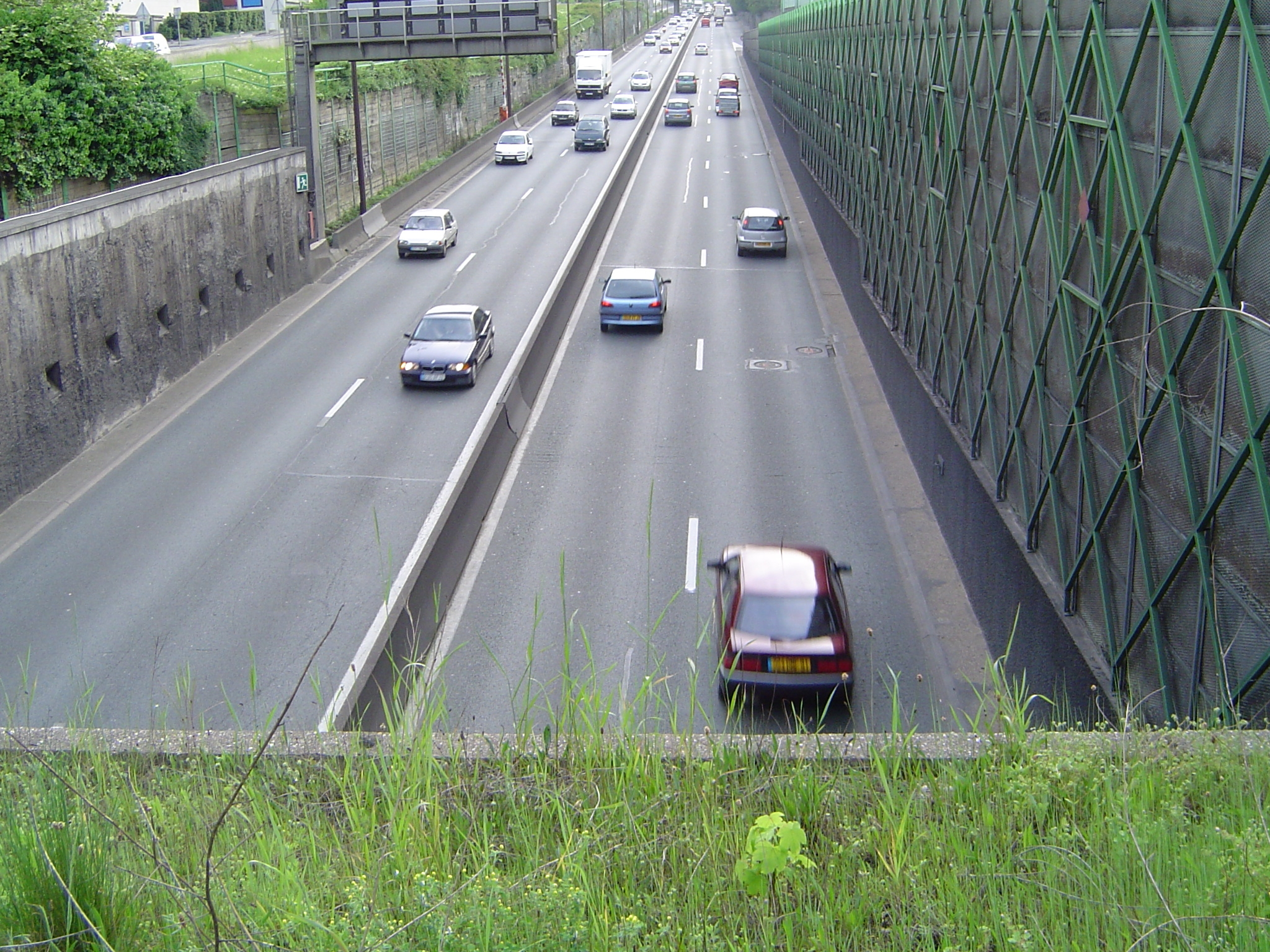
Access to the tunnel under the A86 autoroute, at the sub-prefecture level

Antony is primarily served by the D920 road (formerly National Route 20) which passes along the entire length of the commune tracing the route of the Roman road via Aurelianensis which crossed Gaul from south to north coming from Spain and going to Cologne.

Crossing Antony from east to west is the A86 autoroute which, since 1996, follows the route of National Road RN186 which itself traced the route of the road opened by Louis XV. The A86 is heavily used by Parisians during peak hours in the morning and late afternoon. It is a way of avoiding Paris by a peripheral route. Though it replaced the function of the RN186, the latter was retained as an urban axis. Parts of the A86 are covered or are in a tunnel at Antony. Work began there more than thirty years ago and was completed by the end of the 2000s. Due to lack of funding, construction of the southern tunnel of the A86 has currently stopped at the RER bridge. The drilling of the section between the Sub-Prefecture building and the RER bridge is still under consideration by State services.

These roads have very high traffic (20,000 to 40,000 vehicles per day) and cause nuisance to local residents. It is expected that eventually the RD920 will be converted into an urban boulevard.

Antony is also served by the A10 autoroute with an exit to join the RN20 and to enter through the south of the city.

==== Bicycle paths and pedestrian areas ====
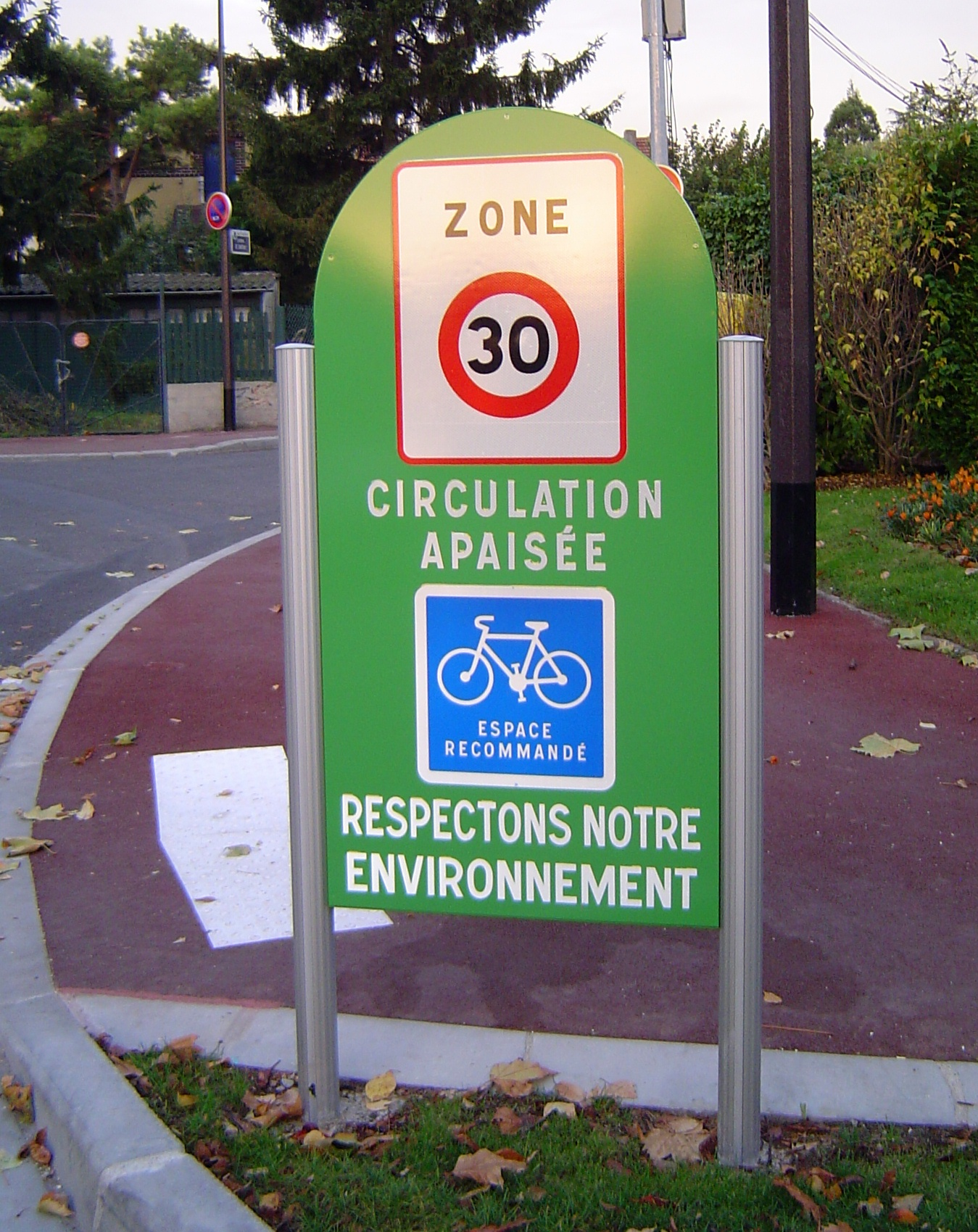
30 km/h (19 mph) zone (cemetery district)

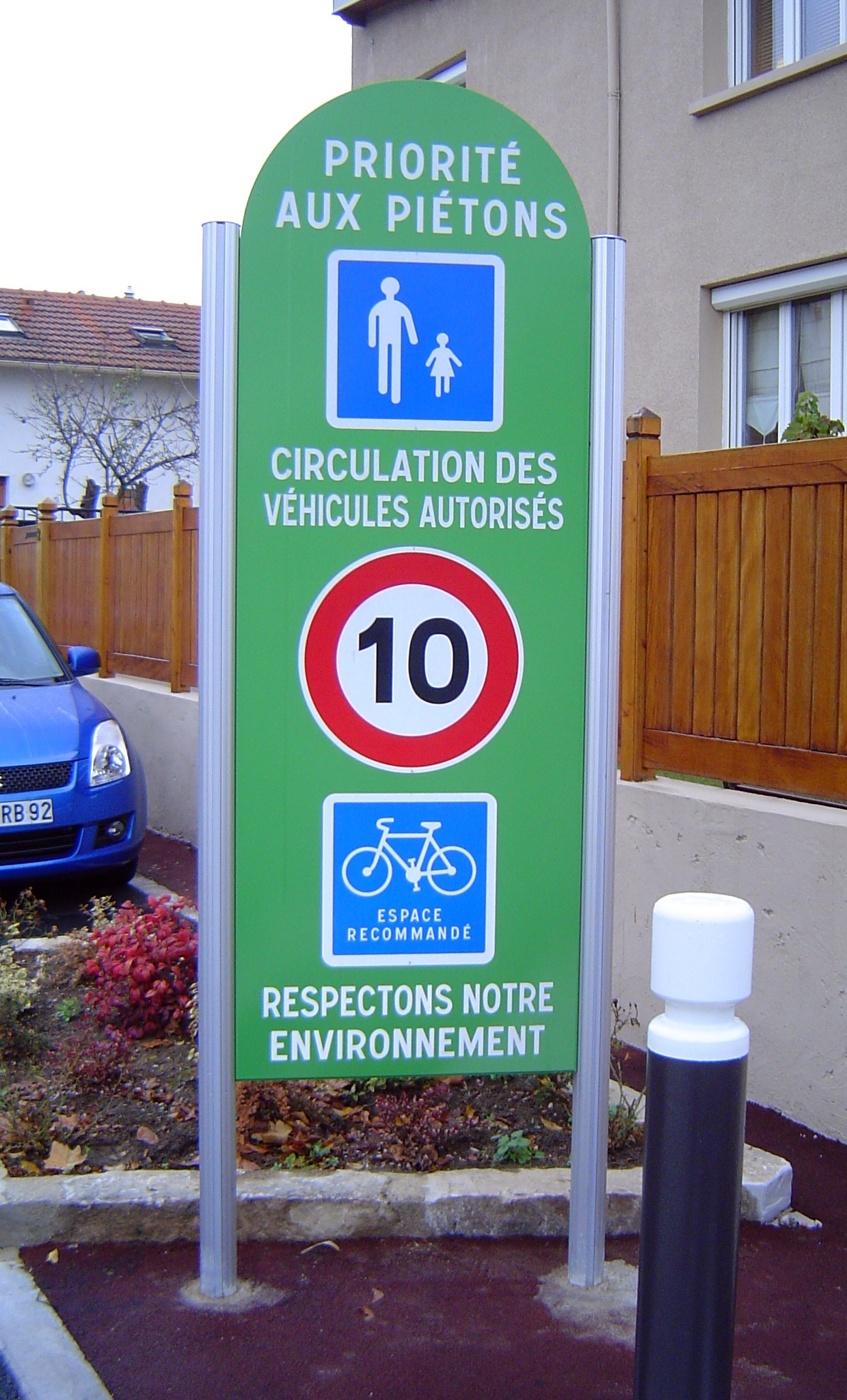
10 km/h (6 mph) zone (cemetery district)

In November 1989 a bike path running through the city inside the Green Belt was built for a length of one kilometre (0.62 miles). Since 9 October 2005 it has been possible to cycle inside the Parc de Sceaux, an area dependent on Hauts-de-Seine department but partly in Antony.

Given the density of traffic and as intended by PLU, a coherent easy circulation network consisting of areas limited to 30 km/h and cycling paths primarily to schools and colleges was created. A zone limited to 30 km/h is linked to a zone limited to 10 km/h: in this area priority is given to pedestrians as shown in the photo below.

Expansion of areas limited to 30 km/h is underway in all areas of Antony with the aim of gradually moving the whole city to 30 km/h except for the RD920, for which a redevelopment project is proposed for the creation of cycle paths.

The 30 km/h (19 mph) zones were defined in 2009 and most of the 30 km/h roads are accessible in both directions for cyclists.

==== Communal Transport ====
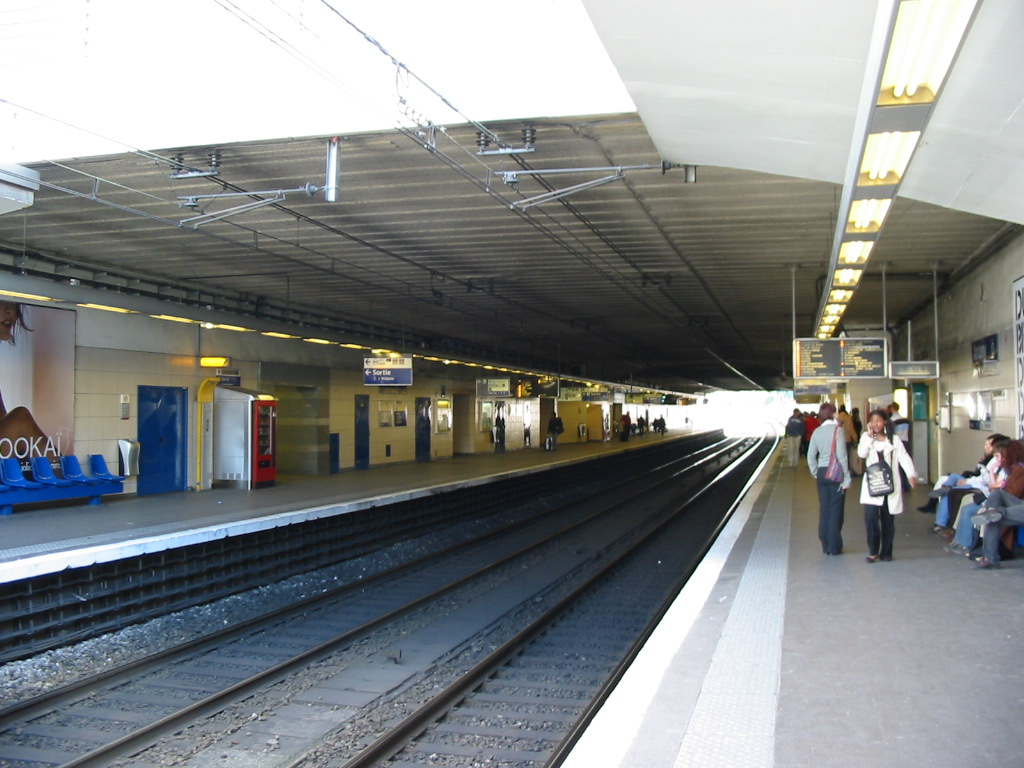
View of Antony railway station

Antony is connected to the RER network through six stations:

five stations on the RER Line B

These are, from north to south:

- Parc de Sceaux
- La Croix de Berny
- Antony
- Fontaine Michalon
- Les Baconnets

The first three stations are in zone 3 for the navigo pass, the other two are in zone 4. Antony station is the most important and was completely rebuilt and returned to service in June 2002. It includes both the station for RER line B, the terminus for 13 bus routes and the terminal of Orlyval. A taxi rank and two bicycle parking garages are nearby. Approximately 25,000 passengers pass through this transport axis every day.

Chemin d'Antony

A station on RER Line C in zone 4.

Many bus routes connect Antony to Paris and neighbouring communes via bus networks in the Île-de-France:

- 10 routes of RATP bus network: TVM, 119, 196, 197, 286, 297, 319, 379, 395, and 396;
- 8 routes of the Paladin bus network: 1, 2, 3, 4, 8, 9, 12, and 13;
- 2 routes of the Daniel Meyer bus network: DM151 and DM152;
- 2 routes of Noctilien: N21 and N71

Since 21 July 2007 the city of Antony has been served by the Trans-Val-de-Marne (Tvm) through the RER station of La Croix de Berny. This rapid transit bus service has its own Bus lanes and links Antony to the Saint-Maur-Créteil railway station providing access to the limits of the region to the east such as Créteil, the Rungis International Market, The Belle Épine commercial centre, and Choisy-le-Roi.

Planned for 2020, the Antony-Clamart Tramway will connect La Croix de Berny railway station to Clamart - Place du Garde.

==== Rail transport ====
By RER Line B Antony is near Paris railway stations. Through Antony station the Gare du Nord and the Gare de Lyon can be reached in 28 minutes (direct connection to the RER) and the Gare Saint-Lazare railway station in 32 minutes. Antony is also very close to the Massy TGV railway station which can be reached in 5 minutes by RER. This station has the distinction of being both one of the new stations of Île-de-France served by inter-provincial TGV and also a new station for the LGV Atlantique radial line. Thus certain trains serve both the Paris-Montparnasse railway station and this station which makes it useful for going to Paris to take the TGV.

RER line C also passes through Antony (the Massy-Pontoise branch) but it is significantly underutilized as serving suburbs because of its simultaneous use as a connecting link for the TGV between the South-West network and the North network as well as having many heavy freight trains. Réseau Ferré de France (RFF) has proposed the creation of a third line on the right of way to facilitate the coexistence of three types of rail traffic, but in the absence of specific guarantees of soundproofing measures the project has been rejected both by the residents' associations and by the Antony council.

==== Air transport and airport access ====
Antony is near Orly Airport. Since 2 October 1991 it can be reached in seven minutes by Orlyval, a narrow-gauge light railway of VAL type from the Antony RER B railway station. The use of this line is provided by RATP and it has special pricing that does not include it in the package for the Navigo pass.

== Town planning ==
=== Urban Morphology ===
INSEE divided the commune into four "large quarters" called Croix de Berny, Rabats, Baconnets, and Centre-ville which were themselves cut into 27 grouped blocks for statistical information.

Land Use in 2008.
| Type of Use | Percentage | Size (hectares) |
|---|---|---|
| Urban Built-up Area | 78,80 % | 749,87 |
| Urban vacant land | 18,50 % | 176,20 |
| Rural Land | 2,70 % | 26,13 |
Source: Iaurif

Antony revised its local urban plan (PLU) in 2007 based on the findings of a survey conducted in 2004 among residents and the results have been an organisation and sustainable development plan (PADD). The development of this PLU ended with the adoption of the final draft by a vote of the City Council on 30 May 2008. The main direction for the PLU was a balanced urban development, a dynamic economy, developing public facilities, and to preserve a framework for a quality living environment with improved movement of people. This vision has however been challenged by a preceding public inquiry. The municipality indicated that the city enjoyed a lifestyle that should be preserved: a rich natural heritage, green spaces, a diverse architectural heritage (the old stone quarry, individual art nouveau houses, art deco and modern architecture), an ancient well-developed heart with many rows of trees and woodlands but, paradoxically, part of the suburban area was transferred into a zone where dense building development became possible.

The PLU (the subject of a draft amendment in 2012) defined the segmentation of the commune into 9 districts: Croix de Berny / La Fontaine, Coulée verte, Centre-ville / Hôtel de ville, Centre-ville / Mounié, Pajeaud, Paul-Bert, Noyer-Doré / Baconnets, Rabats, and Industrial Zones. Antony has 110 kilometres (68 miles) of streets of which 80.6 kilometres (50.1 miles) are local roads, 16.7 kilometres (10.4 miles) departmental and national roads for which the city is responsible for maintenance, and 13.1 kilometres (8.1 miles) of private roads.

=== Housing ===
To cope with the increasing number of people since the 1950s two interesting Castors (self-construction cooperative) experiments took place in Antony in 1953 and 1954. The Castor was responsible to build his own home there and to pay close attention. After the Second World War, before the housing shortage, the French decided to build their own houses by joining in anonymous cooperative societies. Thus companies were created, such as "The Cricket of Île-de-France" and "The Castors of Bièvre". In 1953, the Company of Counters of Montrouge which had allotments at Antony (located behind the square Marc Sangnier on the border with Fresnes) offered its employees to sell the land at a nominal price. Nearly 150 houses were built between 1953 and 1957. Their owners were fully invested in these constructions, working on weekends and after their workday. The rules were very strict: rest was only allowed one Sunday per month and only during a week of paid leave. The allocation of houses to employees was made by lot, one each until every house was built. Many houses are still occupied by the original Castor.

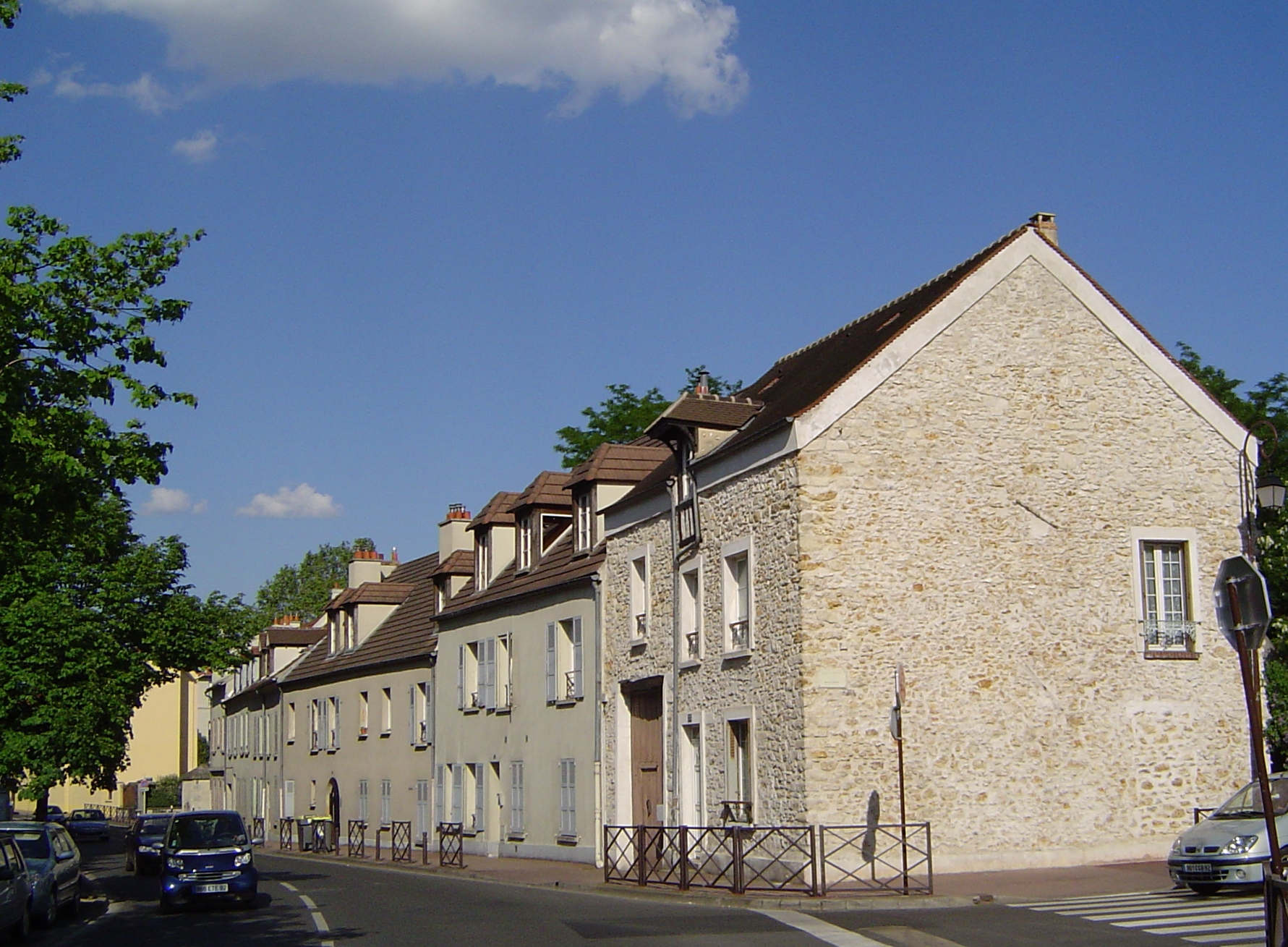
Ancient wine growers' houses in the city centre

The housing seen in Antony today represents a diversified heritage: ancient houses in quarry stone, individual Art Nouveau house, Art Deco houses, and contemporary architecture. Buildings built in the 1960s are being renovated while in recent years small buildings have replaced the old houses along the RD920 (ex-RN20) to achieve a continuous frontage. In a survey by the weekly Le Point on the cities of France "where we saw the best", Antony is very well ranked in almost all areas studied, notably in first position for housing. In 2017 in Antony there were 28,841 housing units including 26,734 primary homes or 92.7% of all dwellings. Second homes and casual accommodation numbered 424 units or 1.5% of the total. The number of vacant houses totaled 1,684 or 5.8%. Of all of these units there were 9,275 individual houses (32.2%) and 19,394 units in shared buildings (67.2%).

The average number of occupants per dwelling decreased sharply: 3.24 in 1968, 2.65 in 1982 and 2.43 in 1999. The number of households of one or two persons increased between 1982 and 1999 and had an influence on the consumption of housing land, especially in the outer areas. Thus as the number of households increases the commune needs more housing to accommodate the same number of inhabitants.

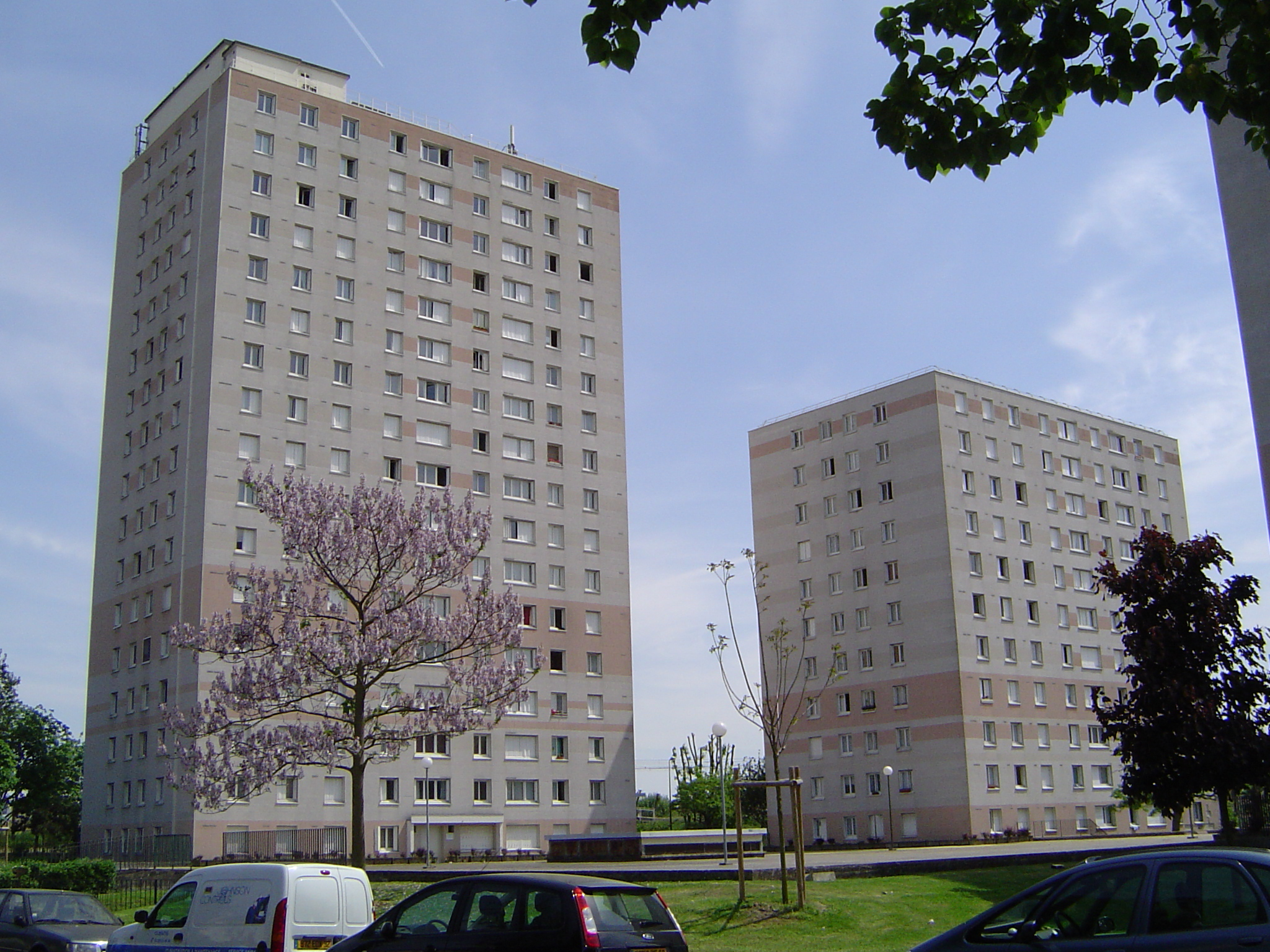
Tall buildings in the "White City" of Antony

The primary residences are relatively recent: in 2017, 2,731 units or 10.4% predated 1945, 9,035 dated from the period between 1946 and 1970 (34.4%); 7,337 dated from 1971 to 1990 (27.9%), and 4,042 dated from 1991 to 2005 (15.4%). As for the number of rooms in these houses, 7.4% had one room, 14.4% had two rooms, 27.6% had three rooms, 23.1% had four rooms, and 27.5% had five or more rooms.

In Antony the average price of real estate for sale in 2008 was about 4,270 euros/m2 and the average price of property for rent was EUR 17.39/m2/month. The suburban area covers 2/3 of the city with a coefficient of occupation of land of 0.7. The municipality claims to be seeking to enforce a rule of 20% social housing but the communal social housing policy was challenged by an inter-ministerial mission during the summer of 2008. Many projects to rehabilitate social housing are underway but since 1990 there has been more destruction of social housing than creation. This is particularly the case in the construction of the "Grand Ensemble", "Parvis" (Breuil, Bièvre), "White City", and "Guillebaud City". The municipality also highlighted the renovation of buildings along the RD920 (ex RN20) to promote a continuous frontage and dormant urbanisation spaces which is presented as an attempt to maintain the number of inhabitants despite the national trend of decline in the number of people per family.

=== Development projects ===
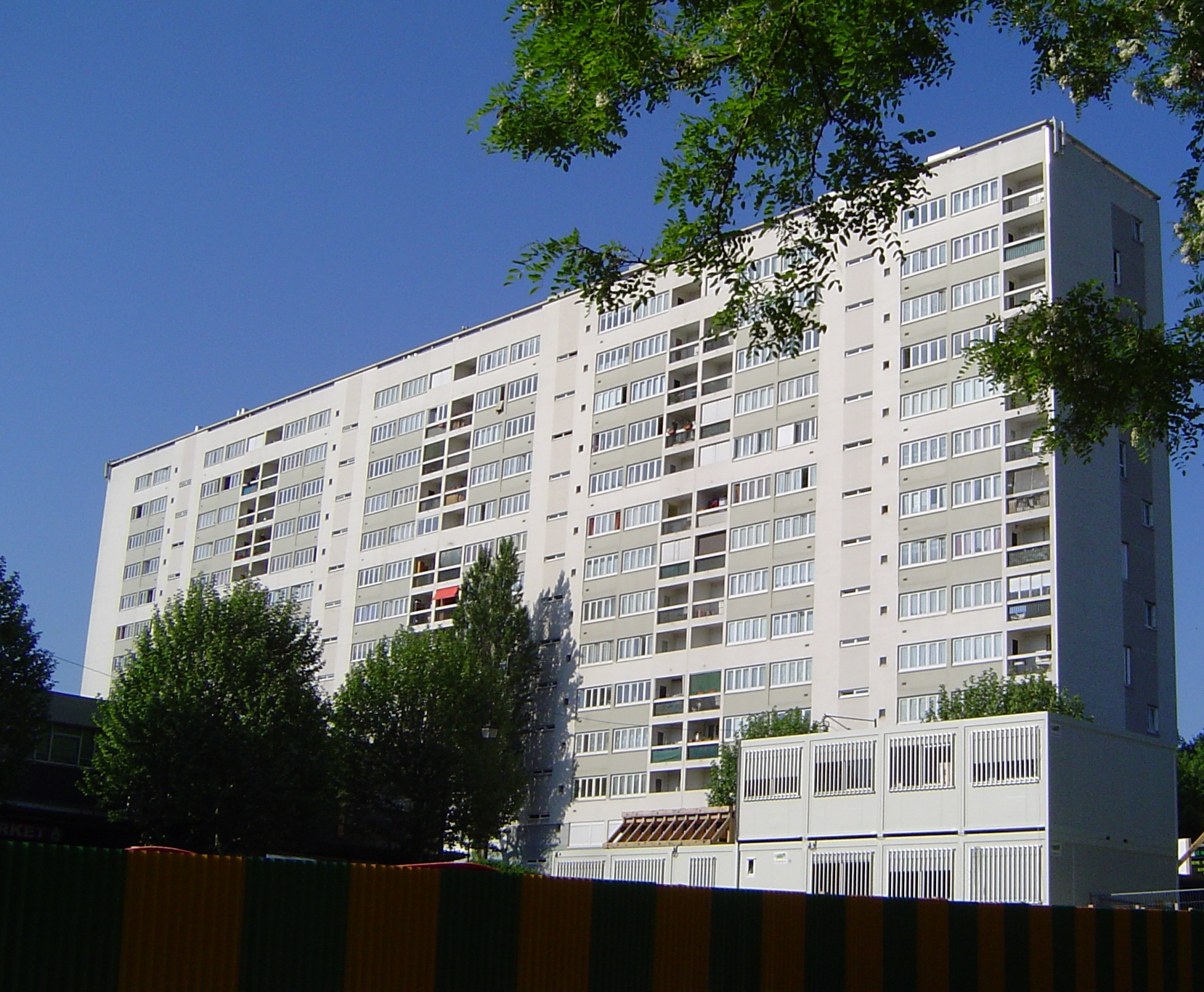
Building in the Noyer-Doré quarter

The two main urbanisation operations in Antony are in the quarter of Croix-de-Berny and Noyer-Doré. Organized by the law No. 2003-710 of 1 August 2003. The national urban renewal program provided an unprecedented national effort to renovate districts in difficulty. It is in this context that the Noyer-Dore district, in the south of Antony, is under renovation. The PLU also provided for two new urban developments: the development of the Bas-Graviers/Crocheteurs district along the A86 and to the east of the city, the development of the Cemagref land near the Descartes school.

The development work in Croix de Berny began in the 1970s with the creation of the A86 then its partial covering. Important work has been undertaken to extend to 2 lanes the 2 tunnels on the A86, its extension to 2 lanes in 3 tunnels is envisaged. The land near the square, which was occupied until 1989 by the sub-prefecture, was ceded to the city of Antony who built office buildings. The layout of the site itself began in the 2000s by installing a fountain 20 metres (66 feet) in diameter whose style and cost have been variously appreciated.

The roofing of the A86 was provisionally completed in 2008. State services are currently working on the completion of the project "Tube South-west" which should finally complete the doubling of the tunnel of Croix de Berny commissioning with two lanes in three tunnels.

The renovation of the district of Noyer-Dore, planned for a decade, began in March 2001 with the destruction of several buildings (including "The Big L" built in the 1960s). This district, always characterized by geographic isolation from the rest of the commune and a deficit in public facilities and shops, is part of the sensitive urban zone called "The Grand ensemble", a zone spread across the communes of Antony and Massy.

== Toponymy ==
It was in a confirmation by King Louis I the Pious made for the monks of Saint-Germain-des-Prés in 829, that the toponym Antony is mentioned for the first time as Antoniacum meaning "estate of Antonius", a Gallo-Roman landowner. Then it was attested in the forms: Anthoniaco, Anthognyaco, Antongni, Antoni, and Antony from the 18th century with the exception of a brief period during the French Revolution when it took the name of Antony-Révolution.

The known origin of the city dates back to the 3rd century. The name Antony is a Gallo-Roman formation and comes from the Latin anthroponym Antonius (giving Antoine, worn by a native), followed by the suffix -acum of Gallic origin. A Homonym with Antogny, Antoigné, and Antoigny all of which toponyms date back to the Gallo-Roman *ANTONIACU.

== History ==
Related article: Île-de-France.

Antony has a long history, dating from the 3rd century in the Gallo-Roman era. Its history merges with that of the Royal Domain formed in the 10th century by the Capetian kings, which gave rise to the Île-de-France region.

=== Prehistoric and Gallo-Roman era ===
In prehistoric times people settled along the edges of the plateau overlooking the valley. The remains of their settlements are still visible in the Bois de Verrières. The selection of sites was from the beginning conditioned by water and access. The village that later gave birth to Antony was installed in a location conducive to human settlement: a hillside site with many advantages—easy to protect because of its height with richer soil than that on the plateau and in an area not subject to flooding as it was above the marshes but at the level of water sources that rise from the green marl. The many fountains in Rue de l'Eglise and the Avenue du Bois-de-Verrières and the place names (Sources, Gouttieres) attest to the existence of this Water table.

In 1852, when the cemetery was being moved from in front of the church, sarcophagi were discovered that were originally supposed to be Frankish or Merovingian. It may be that people have lived around the Gallo-Roman villa since ancient times.

=== Antony from the 10th to the 15th centuries ===
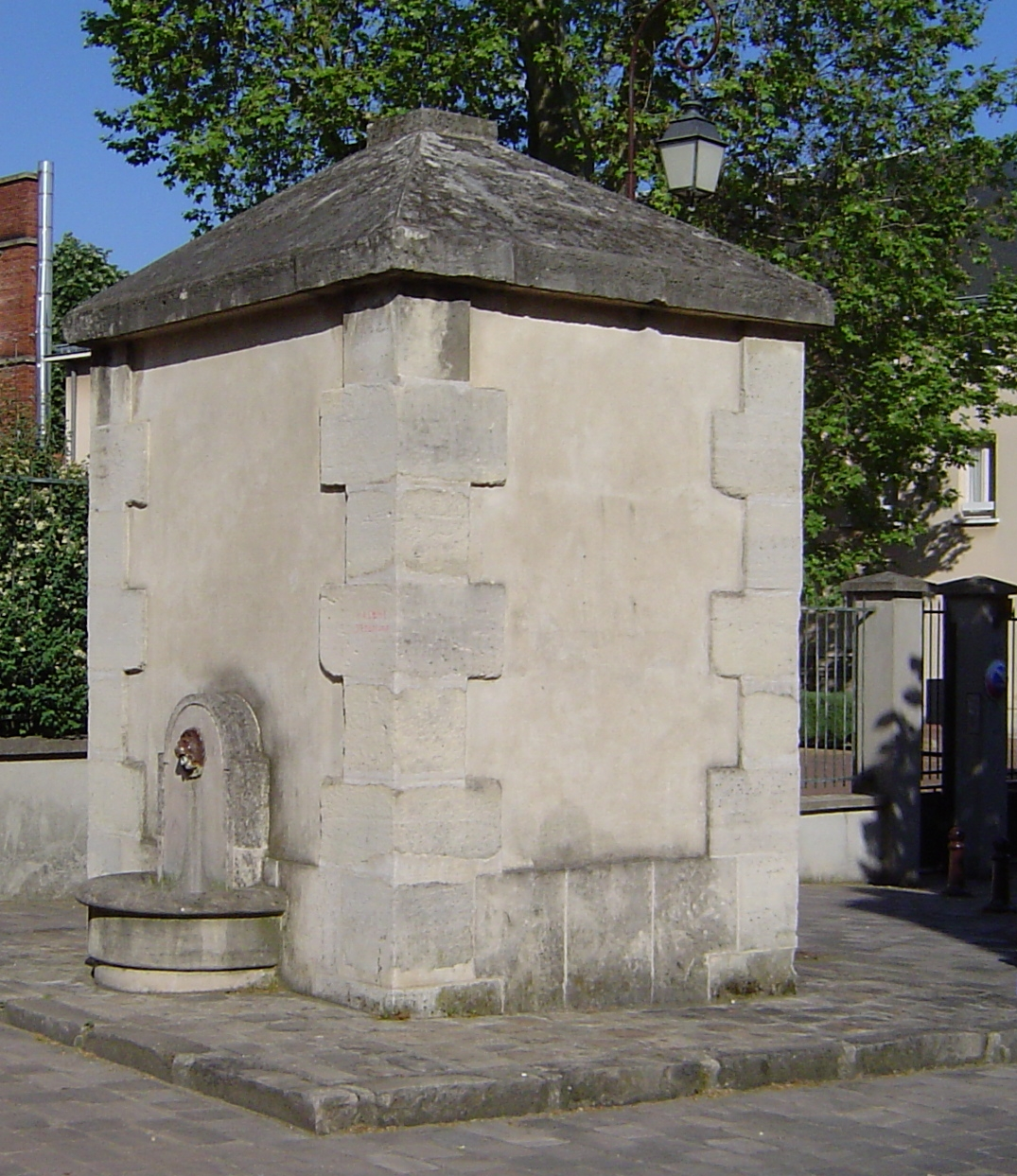
Wells from the Middle Ages in the city centre, rebuilt in 1707 and transformed into a fountain in 1835.

From the 10th to the 15th century the Lordship of Antony was one of the main dependencies of the Abbey of Saint-Germain-des-Prés. The location at Antony had a ford called Pont-aux-Ânes (Bridge of the Asses) from Roman and medieval times. This hillside location provided Antony with a connection with Montlhéry, a stronghold which monitored the southern approaches to Paris. Antony also had a small fortress, the Tour d'Argent (Tower of Silver) which was located in the upper part of the village in a position overlooking the ford and possibly serving a defensive function.

In 1042, the King of France, Henri I, accorded the abbot of Saint-Germain des Près "an altar dedicated to Saint Saturnin and located in the territory of Paris, in the jurisdiction called Paris".

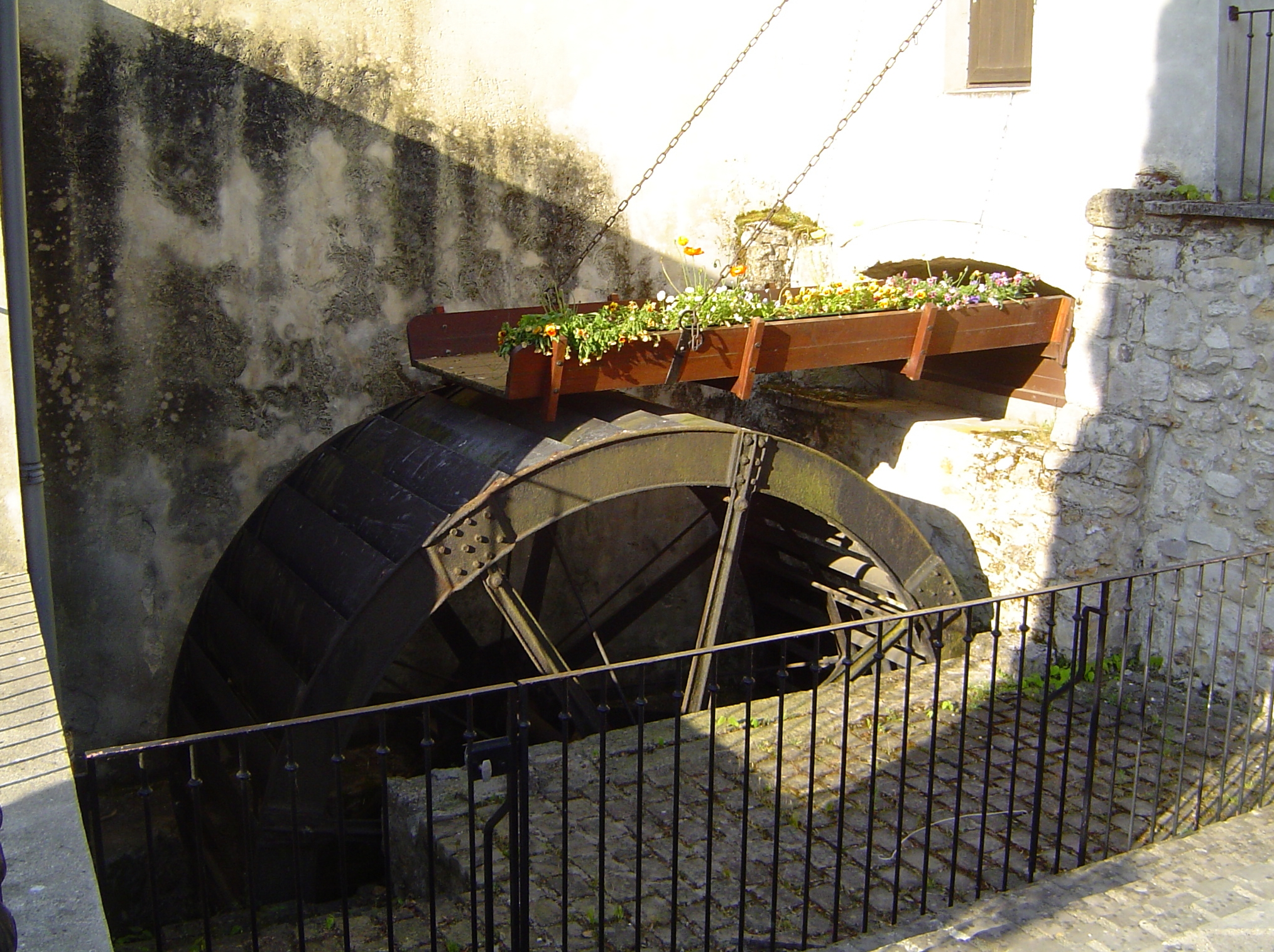
The mill wheel ensured the production of flour for Antonians for 10 centuries.

In 1177 in recognition of the importance of the village Antony chapel became a parish church. The people were then all serfs of the Abbey. City dwellers then began to get communal Charters and those campaigns began the great liberation movement that led to the emancipation of the serfs.

The decisive date was in 1248: Thomas de Mauleon, the Abbot of Saint-Germain des Près, freed his serfs in Antony and Verrières. Many expenses still faced these farmers: they had to pay an annual rent, tithes for the mills, ovens, and presses, and also provide Corvées or unpaid labour, such as cleaning the Bièvre every three years.

The Kings of France had the right of accommodation in Antony. Under Louis IX there were lawsuits against people who refused to submit to this law. They were condemned.

During the 14th and 15th centuries Antony had troubles from the Hundred Years War then the Armagnac–Burgundian Civil War: plagues, famine and devastation. At the end of this long period, the Abbey was crushed by debt and the region was emptied of its inhabitants. There were only 100 inhabitants left in Antony at the end of the wars.

In 1346 King Philip of Valois, on his way to the feast of the Assumption, camped in Antony believing that Edward III, King of England, would pass through there on his way to Flanders. The prince waited in vain for two days, the King of England having passed through Poissy heading towards Beauvais.

=== The opening up (16th to 18th centuries) ===
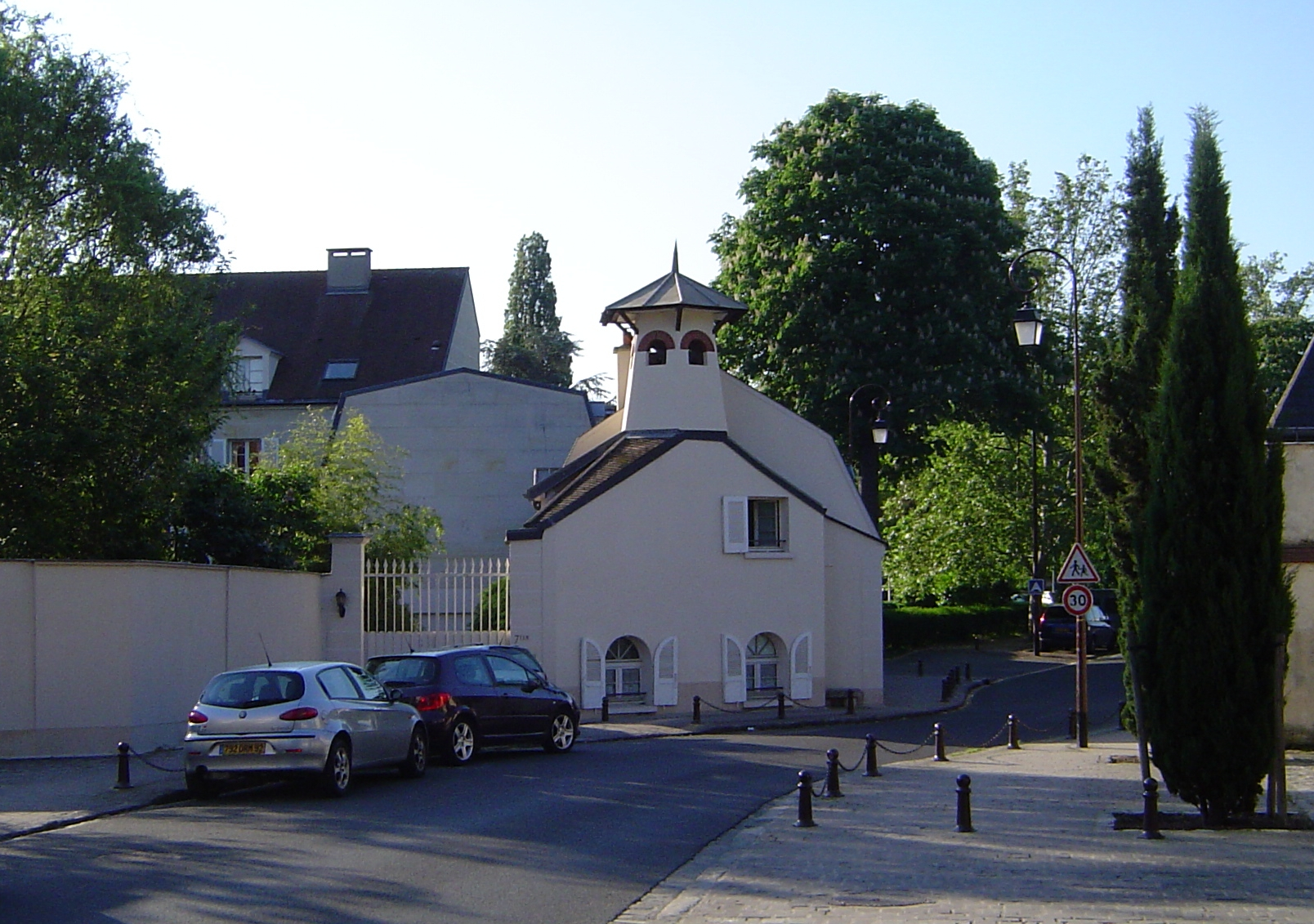
The dovecote from Antony Castle (1648)

The road from Paris to Orléans was paved under François I: it crossed the Bièvre at the Pont d'Antony from which a path led to the centre of the village near the church of Saint-Saturnin. The development of this road led to the development of the city.

In 1545 François I, while at prayers with Cardinal de Tournon, Commendatory abbot of Saint Germain, gave letters patent for the establishment of fairs at Antony on Thursday after Pentecost and on Saint Catherine's day (25 November) as well as a market every Thursday.

The famous top-quality candle maker Trudon was established here in 1737 after buying the business established in 1702 from Pean de Saint Gilles, wax supplier to the King.

At the end of the 17th century and early in the 18th century, Antony became a holiday town close to Paris: La Fontaine and Charles Perrault took their summer quarters there. This is also the period during which many mansions were built by notable Parisian who came to Antony for the countryside just outside Paris. Most mansions still remained in the middle of the 20th century: the old castle, the property of the actor François Molé, the folly of the Castries family in Heller Park now demolished but an outbuilding remains, the house of the Belle Levantine (now the Maison Saint-Jean), the property of the Ladies of Saint Raphael, and the property of Ballainvilliers purchased in 1860 by the surgeon Alfred Velpeau.

=== Development in the 19th century ===
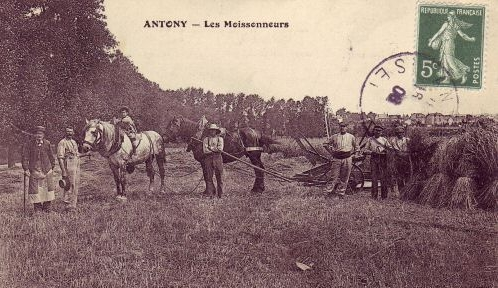
Harvest at Antony in 1908

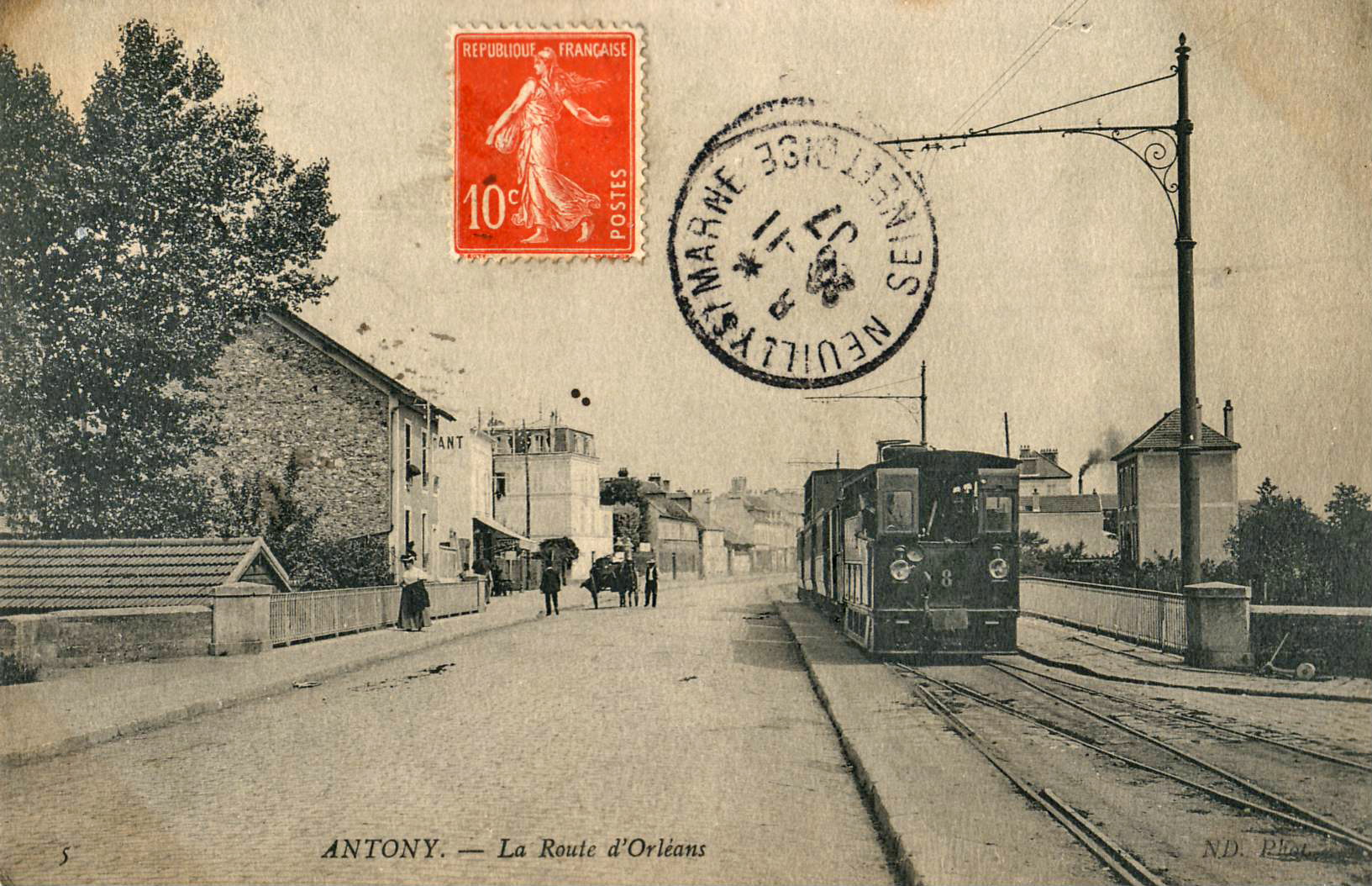
Arpajonnais on the RN20 at the beginning of the 20th century. The Catenary for electric traction is already installed, but the train is pulled by a bi-cab steam locomotive.

Antony remained predominantly agricultural until the early 20th century. Le Petit Journal wrote in 1922: "The pretty commune of Antony is one of those, in the suburbs of Paris, where agriculture is still the most thriving". The city was known for its coaching inn for horses that welcomed travelers at the crossroads called "Croix de Berny" because it was at the intersection of the royal road, dating from the 18th century, leading from Versailles to Choisy-le-Roi, and the road from Paris to Orléans with the intersection in the north-west corner of the Château de Berny Park.

The construction of the railway profoundly transformed the activity of the city when the Sceaux line opened in 1854 then the Arpajonnais line in 1893. The building of mansions continued: the property of the Marquis of Castries was demolished and replaced in the Second Empire by Sarran Castle and Bourdeau Park whose remains have today become the Maison des Arts (Art House).

Antony became the seat of numerous religious congregations. The Sisters of the Cross of Saint-André who had a girls' religious school at Antony since 1720, in 1928 became the Institute of the Cross, then The Cross before being integrated into the Institution of Sainte-Marie of Antony which incorporated several religious congregations. The Marianists bought the Chénier property and installed their French seminar. Returning after their expulsion in 1903, their building became the Maison Saint-Jean, now a retreat for Marianists. In 1968 they created the Institution of Sainte-Marie of Antony.

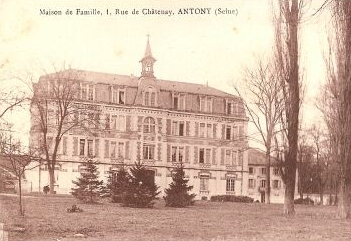
The Chénier property, transformed into a boarding house after the expulsion of Marianists in 1905.

The Redemptorists (Congregation of the Most Holy Redeemer) purchased the property of the surgeon Velpeau on 5 August 1889 to build their novitiate. Following the Separation of Church and State in 1905 they had to leave Antony as they were expelled on 13 June 1908. They had meanwhile built very large buildings which were taken by the Seine Department and became the Paul-Manchon day nursery.

In 1890 the Sisters of St. Joseph of Cluny bought the buildings of the former royal manufactory of waxes. They installed a nursing home for the sisters returning from the colonies. The main building is now a retreat for the sisters of this congregation.

The Ladies of Saint Raphael settled in 1893. Their work was to host single mothers to help ensure their safe child-bearing and also ran a school founded by Father Amédée Ferrand de Missol (1805-1883), a physician who became a priest, friend and companion of Frédéric Ozanam. These religious left Antony in 1972 after creating a similar place in Colombia. The school was closed and the association was taken over by the laity.

=== Development in the 20th century ===
The first major development in Antony was performed under the guidance of its Senator-Mayor Augustus Mounié: the city went from 4,000 to 20,000 inhabitants. Elected mayor in 1912, he immediately attacked the problem of housing. Nicknamed in the newspaper "Le Père des mal-lotis" (The Father of the poor), he created more than forty associations of the poor to carry out sanitation of housing. He built schools, many roads, and installed street lighting.

In 1940 refugees flocking to the capital to go south. The mayor organised dormitories in schools and sought to supply the refugees by any means and 7,000 Antonians remained on site out of 19,000 inhabitants. Schools were emptied: students and teachers were first sent to Savigny-sur-Braye, then Saumur, and finally Bouille-Loretz. On 14 June 1940 the Germans come into town and used the stadium and the Jules Ferry school as places to hold 8,000 prisoners of war.

Antony was the first city in the Seine department liberated by troops of the 2nd Armoured Division of General Leclerc on 24 August 1944.

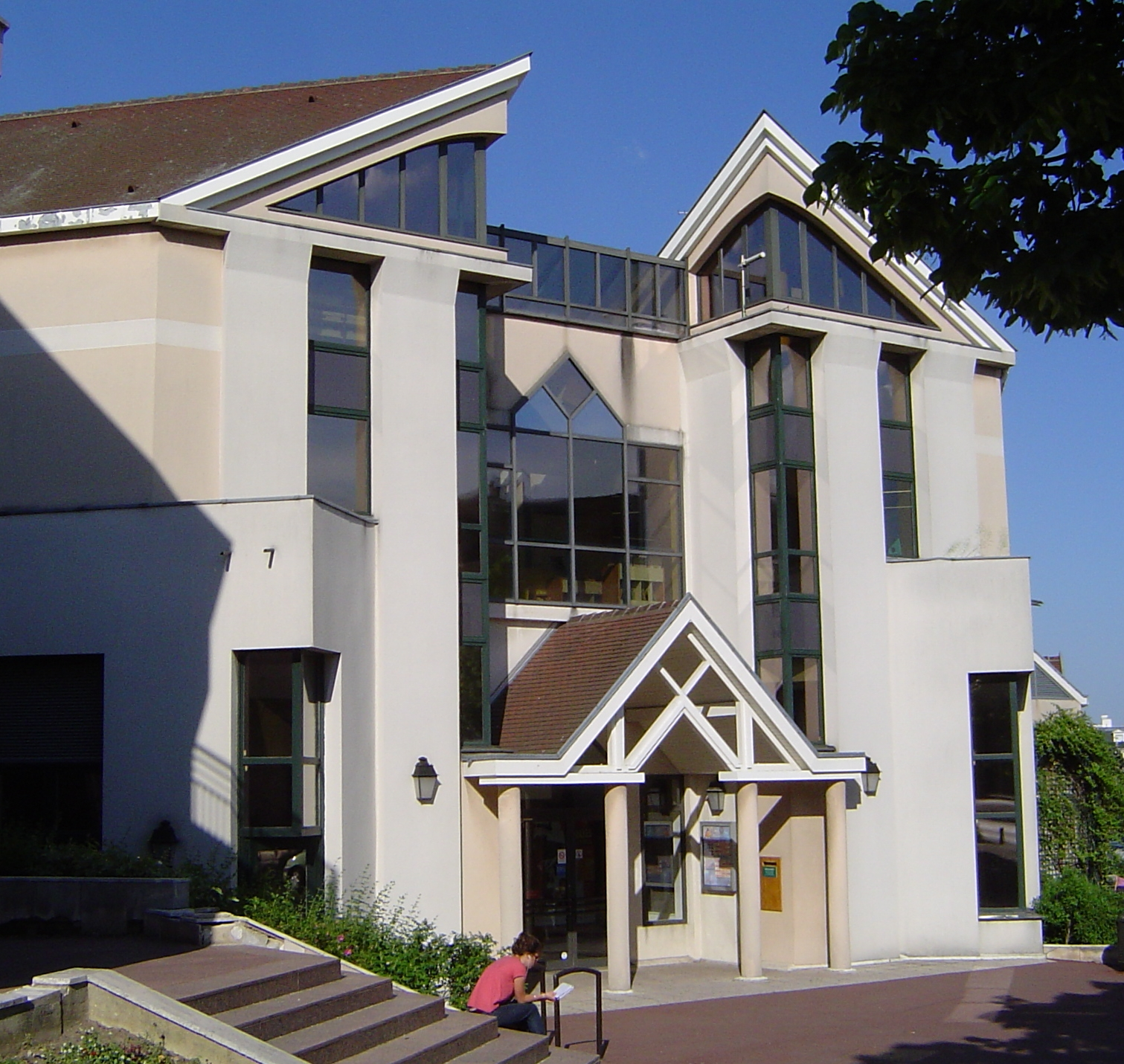
The Anne-Fontaine library (1990)

The second development was a consequence of the very rapid housing construction in the early 1960s to accommodate the returnees from Algeria. Rapid urbanization led to the construction of small buildings but also low-rise apartments such as "The Grand L" famous for its interior corridors 174 m (571 ft) long and a height of 11 floors which was demolished in February 2001. In 20 years, from 1955 to 1975, the population increased from 24,512 to 57,795. During this period, the city built 11 nursery and primary schools, three colleges, a school, a large stadium, five school gyms with a sports centre, a sports park, two leisure centres, a swimming pool, a city hall, and thousands of units of social housing. The new city hall is a modern work by architect Georges Felus and was inaugurated on 19 June 1970.

The 1990s saw the reconstruction of the library in 1990, then in 1996 the fire station and the Conservatory of Music. The 2000s saw the end of the development work undertaken for nearly 40 years in the Croix-de-Berny quarter. This quarter, a strategic crossroads of communication (the A86, A6, A10, and near Orly Airport and RER B), near the Parc de Sceaux, was redeveloped to attract businesses and create jobs. It is predicted that 7,000 jobs will be created in this district.

=== Heraldry ===
The arms of Antony were adopted on 20 June 1919 but have since been simplified. The latest version dates to 1987.

| Arms of Antony | These arms do not respect the rule of tincture and are therefore armes fausses (faulty arms) (Inescutcheon of Sable on Azure). Blazon: Quarterly, 1 and 4 Azure with Inescutcheon of Sable charged with three roundels Argent accompanied by 3 fleurs-de-lis of Or; 2 and 3 Gules a column Argent, in chief (sewn) Azure charged with a lion passant of Or. |

The bridge that was on the river has recently disappeared from the shield, but the motto remains: "parvus ubi pagus fuit Urbem jam alluit unda" meaning: "where there was a village, the river now waters a city".

The original coat of arms of 1919 are officially blazoned as: "Quarterly, 1 and 4 Azure with three fleurs-de-lis of Or with an escutcheon at Fess-point Sable with three roundels Argent; 2 and 3 quarterly, 1 and 4 Gules with a column Argent, in chief (sewn) Azure a lion passant of Or, 2 and 3 Azure with three bends of Or, in chief (sewn) Azure with a lion issuant of Or; over all in Vert a bridge of Argent masoned and Ajouré in Sable over a river Argent.".

In summary: the fleurs-de-lis, escutcheons, and roundels are for the Abbey of Saint-Germain-des-Prés, the tower evokes the old fortress overlooking the Bièvre ford; the lion is from the arms of Hugues de Lionne, first Marquis of Berny and French Foreign Minister (1663-1671).

== Politics and administration ==
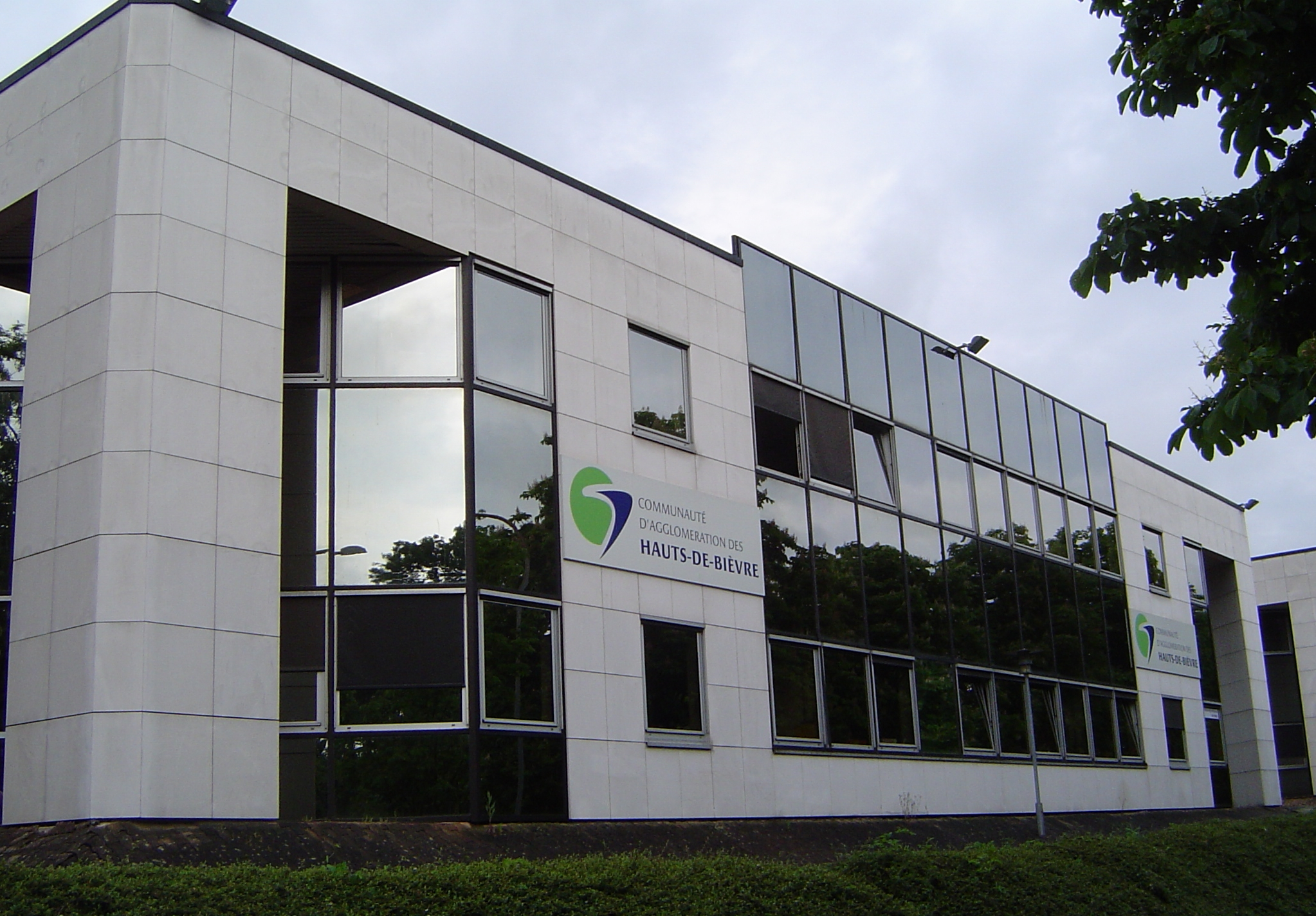
Agglomeration Community building at Châtenay-Malabry

Antony is one of the two sub-prefectures of the department of Hauts-de-Seine in the Île-de-France region. The canton of Antony includes only two-thirds of the commune from its southern part, the rest belongs to the Canton of Bourg-la-Reine. The commune of Antony since 1986 has belonged to the thirteenth electoral district of Hauts-de-Seine.

Since 2006 Antony has been one of the communes that uses voting machines.

=== Political balance ===
Politically, from the early 1980s Antony has been a right-wing town. The current president of the General Council of Hauts-de-Seine and former minister, Patrick Devedjian, won four consecutive terms as mayor in the city of Antony. From 16 October 1983 to 30 May 2002 he ran for municipal elections as a member of the RPR. His successor as mayor, Raymond Sibille, was elected as a UMP mayor as was his successor, Jean-Yves Sénant, who was reelected in 2008.

In the 2005 French European Constitution referendum, Antonians voted overwhelmingly for the European Constitution with 63.60% for "Yes" against 36.40% for "No" with an abstention rate of 24.77% (Whole of France: 54.67% "No", 45.33% "Yes").

In the French presidential election of 2007, the first round saw Nicolas Sarkozy with 34.86% or 11,924 votes, followed by Ségolène Royal with 27.53% or 9,418 votes, then François Bayrou with 22.98% or 7,861 votes, and finally Jean-Marie Le Pen with 5.10% or 1,744 votes with no other candidate exceeding the 5% threshold. In the second round, voters voted 52.69% or 17,241 votes for Nicolas Sarkozy against 47.31% or 15,482 votes for Ségolène Royal, a result close to the national average, which was in the second round 53.06% for Nicolas Sarkozy and 46.94% for Ségolène Royal. Turnout was very high in this presidential election. There are 39,327 registered voters on the Antony electoral list and 87.05% or 34,234 voters participated in the voting. The abstention rate was 12.95% or 5,093 votes, 4.41% or 1,511 votes were blank or invalid so in total 95.59% or 32,723 votes were cast.

=== Municipal administration ===
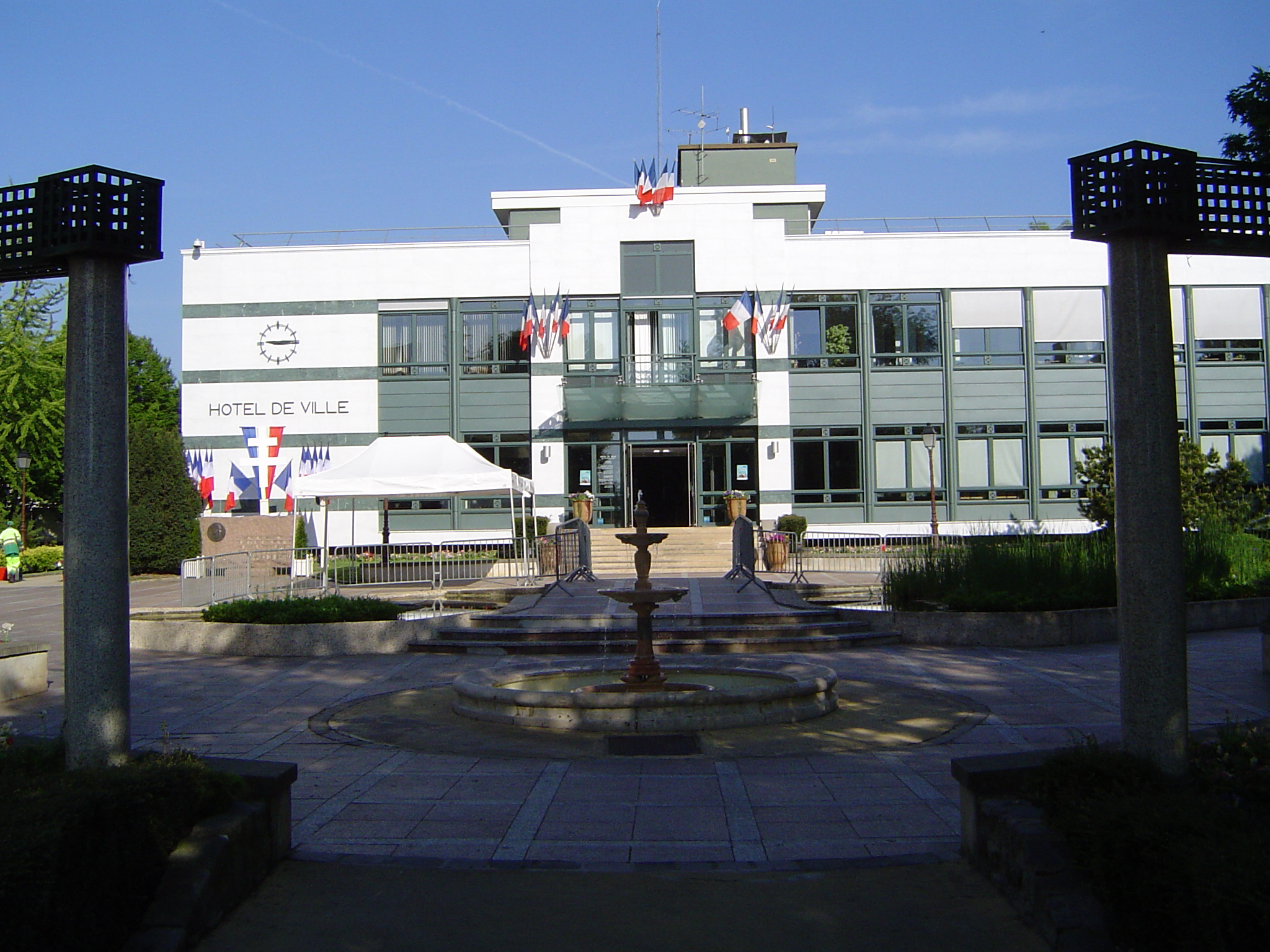
The Hôtel de Ville (town hall), 8 May 2008

The Antony municipal council consists of the mayor, 13 deputy mayors, 21 municipal council delegates, and 10 municipal councilors. Thirty-five city seats on the municipal council are filled by the electoral group Antony for all with Jean-Yves Sénant. The two opposition groups are Union for Antony led by François Rivet and Antony Plus led by Magali Buzelin. One municipal councilor was initially elected as a MoDem on the Antony Plus ticket and considered by the City Council as an opposition councillor, has sat since late 2008 in an independent group and voted with the municipal majority. The current mayor is also the 1st Vice President of the Aagglomeration Community of Hauts-de-Bièvre responsible for finance. He was Regional Adviser for Île-de-France from 2004 to 2010.

The Hôtel de Ville (town hall) was completed in 1970.

In 2000 the municipality established the Council of Young Citizens (CJC). CJC is composed of thirty students with parity between boys and girls. They are elected by their peers in the three schools in the town: Sainte-Marie, Descartes, and Theodore Monod. Divided into three committees, these young people have a duty to reflect on questions of general interest and to propose actions to the municipality.

The municipality also decided in 2008 to establish a Council of Seniors appointed by the mayor on a voluntary basis.

The seats in the municipal council of Antony are allocated as follows:

| Party | President | Seats | Status |
|---|---|---|---|
| UMP, NC, LGM | Jean-Yves Sénant | 35 | majority |
| PS, PCF, Challenge for Antony, PG | François Rivet | 6 | opposition |
| The Greens, Citizens in Antony, PRG | Magali Buzelin | 3 | opposition |
| Antony to Live together | Caroline Pégang | 1 | ? |

In the municipal elections of March 2008, the participation rate for the first and only round was low with only 56.98% of voters. Of the 40,770 registered on electoral lists, 23,229 voted and 22,453 voters made valid votes. Jean-Yves Sénant topped the list with Antony for all Jean-Yves Sénant and was elected with an absolute majority of 52.09% or 11,696 votes. He was followed by the United list of the left led by Francis Rivet who topped the list Union for Antony, who collected 29.39% of the vote or 6,599 votes. The centre-left list Antony Plus with you, with its leader Jean-François Homassel, ranked third with 18.52% of the collected votes or 4,158 votes.

=== Mayors ===
List of successive mayors

Mayors from the French Revolution to 1940

| From | To | Name | Party | Position |
|---|---|---|---|---|
| 1790 | 1791 | Pierre Saturnin Porthaux | | |
| 1791 | 1793 | Jean Mongarny | | |
| 1793 | 1795 | Henri Gau | | |
| 1795 | 1796 | Henri Sébastien Chartier | | |
| 1796 | 1797 | Charles Trudon | | |
| 1797 | 1807 | Philippe Gislain | | |
| 1807 | 1814 | Pierre-Louis Chandoisel | | |
| 1814 | 1816 | Urbain Stanislas Broussin | | |
| 1816 | 1826 | Jérôme Pierre Trudon | | |
| 1826 | 1834 | Alphonse Pierre Beauvais | | |
| 1834 | 1844 | Louis Benoist Dupin | | |
| 1844 | 1856 | Jules-Louis Lohier | | |
| 1856 | 1858 | Léopold Désiré Boudard | | |
| 1858 | 1860 | Jules-Louis Lohier | | |
| 1860 | 1871 | Jean-Etienne Chauvet | | |
| 1871 | 1880 | Charles Cazin | | |
| 1880 | 1884 | Nicolas Surivet | | |
| 1884 | 1886 | Charles Cazin | | |
| 1886 | 1888 | Henri Chevallier | | |
| 1888 | 1890 | Paul d'Etcheverry | | |
| 1890 | 1896 | Louis Langlois | | |
| 1896 | 1900 | Prosper Legouté | | |
| 1900 | 1912 | Louis Langlois | | |
| 1912 | 1940 | Auguste Mounié | | Pharmacist |

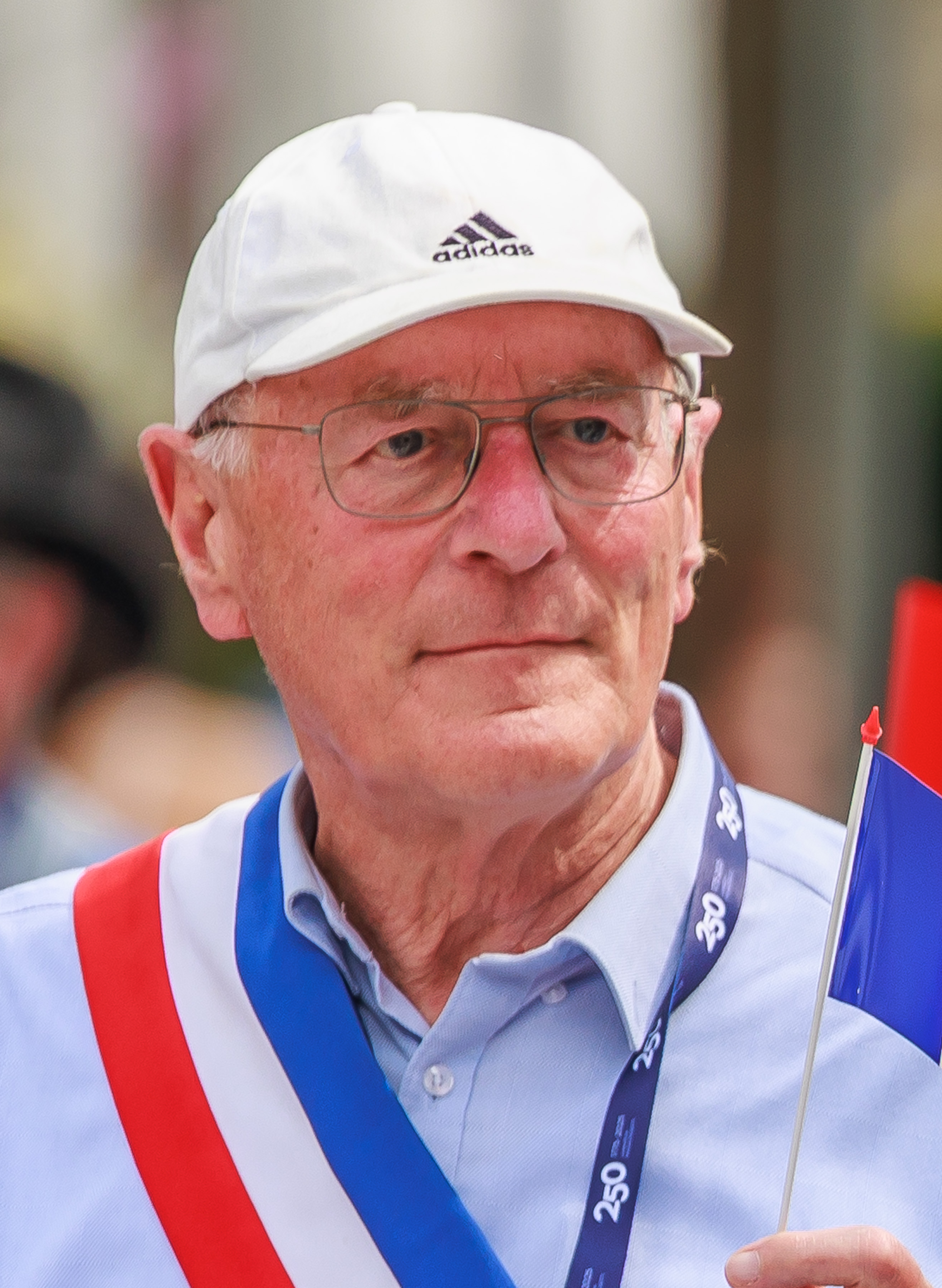
Mayor Jean-Yves Sénant

Mayors from 1940

| From | To | Name | Party | Position |
|---|---|---|---|---|
| 1941 | 1944 | Charles Defforge | | |
| 1944 | 1945 | Henri Lasson | | |
| 1945 | 1947 | Emile Seitz | | |
| 1947 | 1955 | André Blaise | | |
| 1955 | 1955 | Lucie Levenez | | |
| 1955 | 1977 | Georges Suant | RPR | Professor |
| 1977 | 1983 | André Aubry | PCF | Reelection annulled for Electoral Fraud |
| 1983 | 1983 | François Noël Charles | | |
| 1983 | 2002 | Patrick Devedjian | RPR | Lawyer |
| 2002 | 2003 | Raymond Sibille | UMP | Publisher |
| 2003 | 2026 | Jean-Yves Sénant | UMP | Officer in SNCF |

=== Local finance ===
Since the 2000s, the amount of cash flow for the commune remained well above the average for this level (communes from 50,000 to 100,000 population):

Cash flow capacity per inhabitant (in euros)

| | 2012 | 2011 | 2010 | 2009 | 2008 | 2007 | 2006 | 2005 | 2004 | 2003 |
|---|---|---|---|---|---|---|---|---|---|---|
| Antony | 241 | 281 | 299 | 235 | 229 | 217 | 237 | 215 | 180 | 151 |
| Average for this level | 172 | 176 | 169 | 146 | 136 | 150 | 160 | 168 | 166 | 165 |

=== Judicial and administrative jurisdiction ===
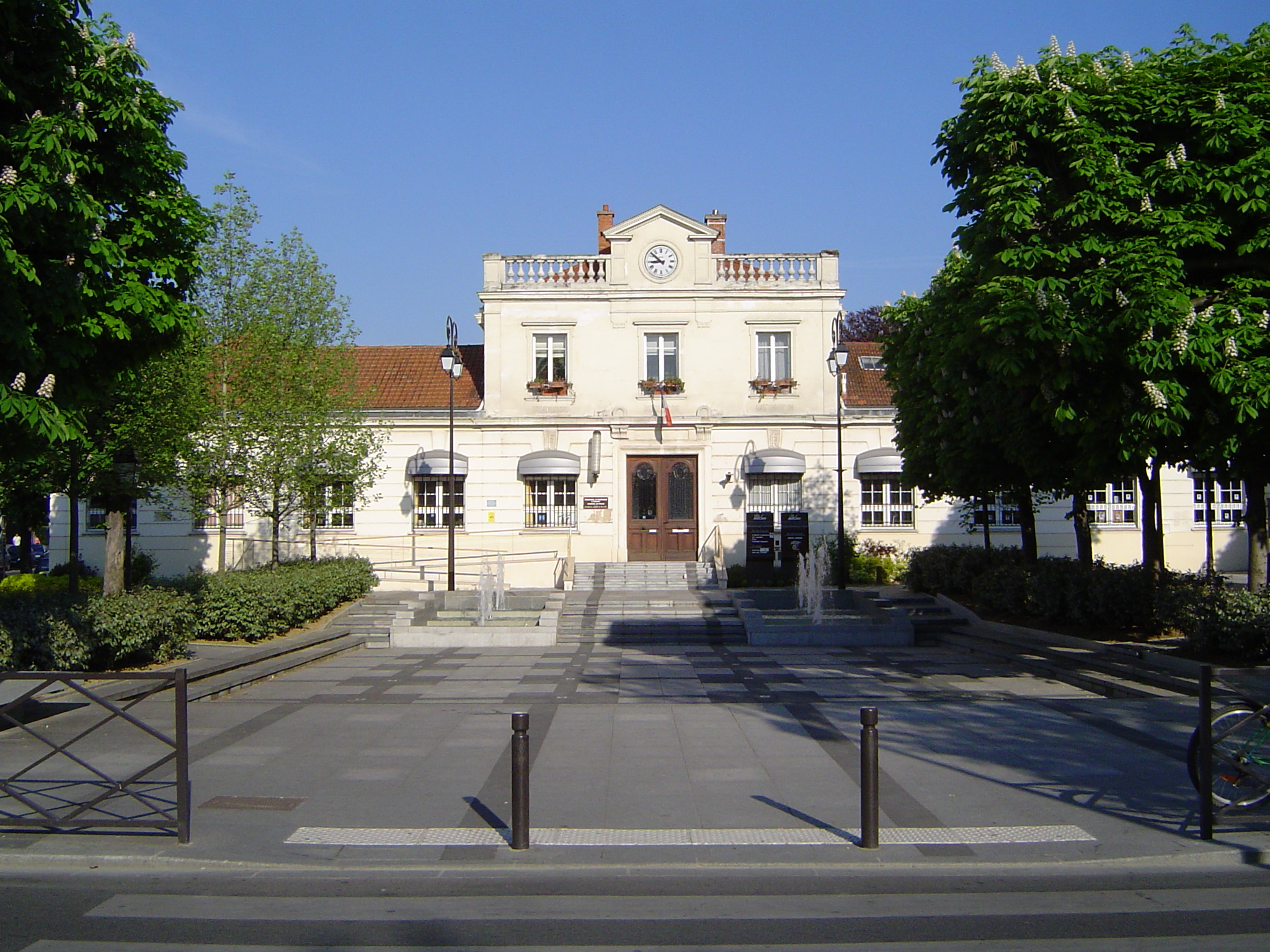
The District Court

Antony is the seat of a District Court. The cantons under the court's jurisdiction are the cantons of Antony, Bagneux, Bourg-la-Reine, Châtenay-Malabry, Fontenay-aux-Roses, Le Plessis-Robinson, Montrouge, and Sceaux.

Antony is also the seat of a Police Court.

Both courts are located in a building that was built in 1872 to accommodate the first school for boys. In 1927 the building was transformed into a city hall until the construction of the new city hall in 1970.

Antony reports to the Tribunal de Grande Instance of Nanterre, the Court of Appeal of Versailles, the Juvenile court of Nanterre, the Conseil de prud'hommes (labour court) in Boulogne-Billancourt, the Commercial Court of Nanterre, the Administrative Tribunal in Cergy-Pontoise, and the Administrative Court of Appeal of Versailles.

=== Environmental policy ===
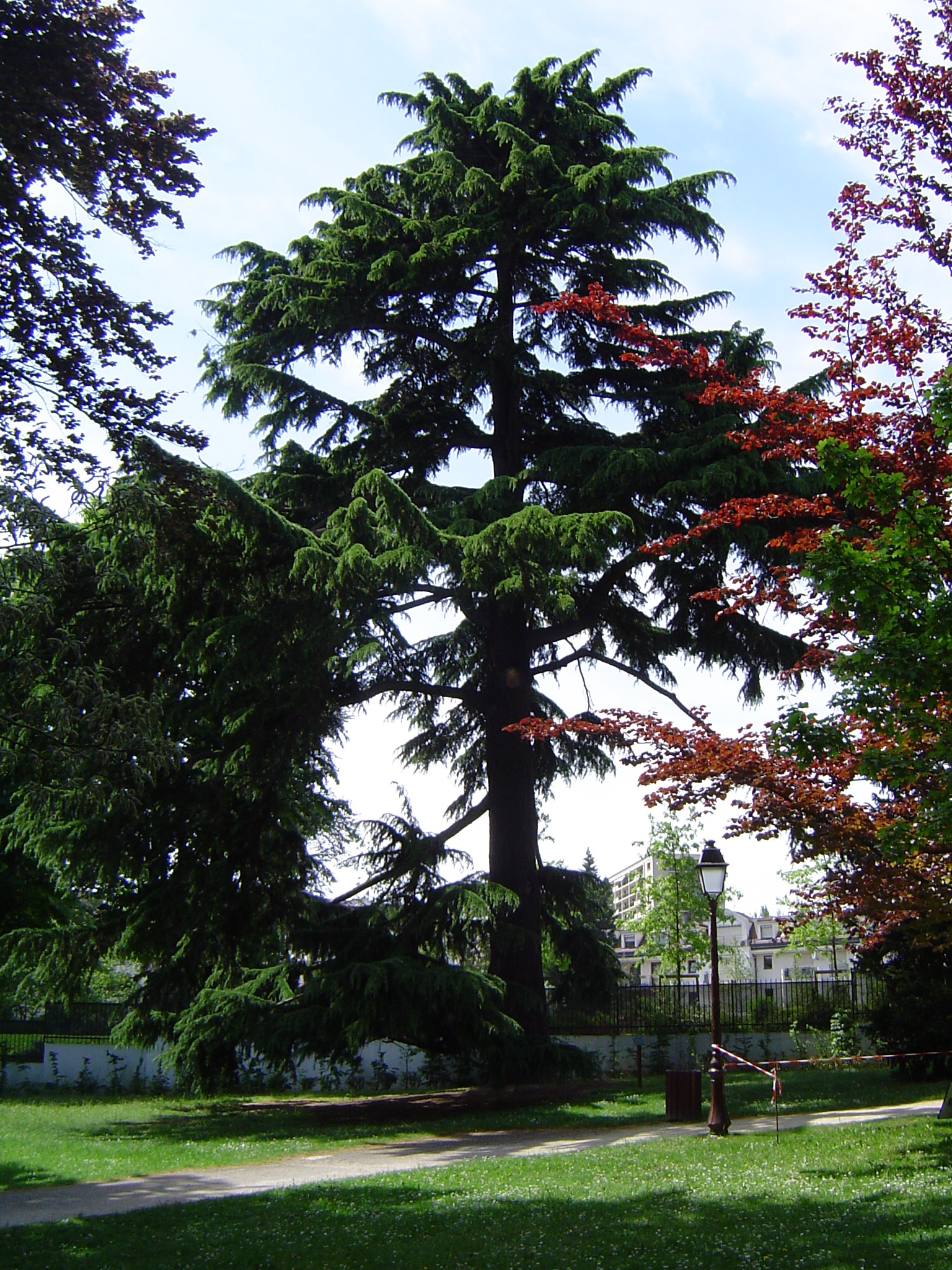
Himalayan cedar in Raymond Sibille park

For a long time Antony has sought to capitalize on its many green spaces. With the help of the Agglomeration Community of Hauts-de-Bièvre visits have been to different sites to discover their remarkable natural resources. The catchment area of the Bièvre has been classified as a "natural ecological, fauna and flora zone" since 1984 by the Ministry of the Environment. This area is a high quality wetland of regional interest—the most remarkable in the Hauts-de-Seine department. In 1992, an ornithological observatory was established at the city's initiative on this site. 132 different species of birds have been observed between 1977 and 1993 including very rare species in Île-de-France. The entire valley to the Parc de Sceaux is registered in the inventory of natural areas of flora and fauna of ecological interest.

A process of planting large trees was initiated in 2008. These trees, 15 m (49 ft) high and 25 years old, are planted in particular locations with the aim of them becoming remarkable trees in the third millennium. These iconic trees mark the landscape and serve as landmarks for urban planning.

== Twin towns – sister cities ==
Sister cities

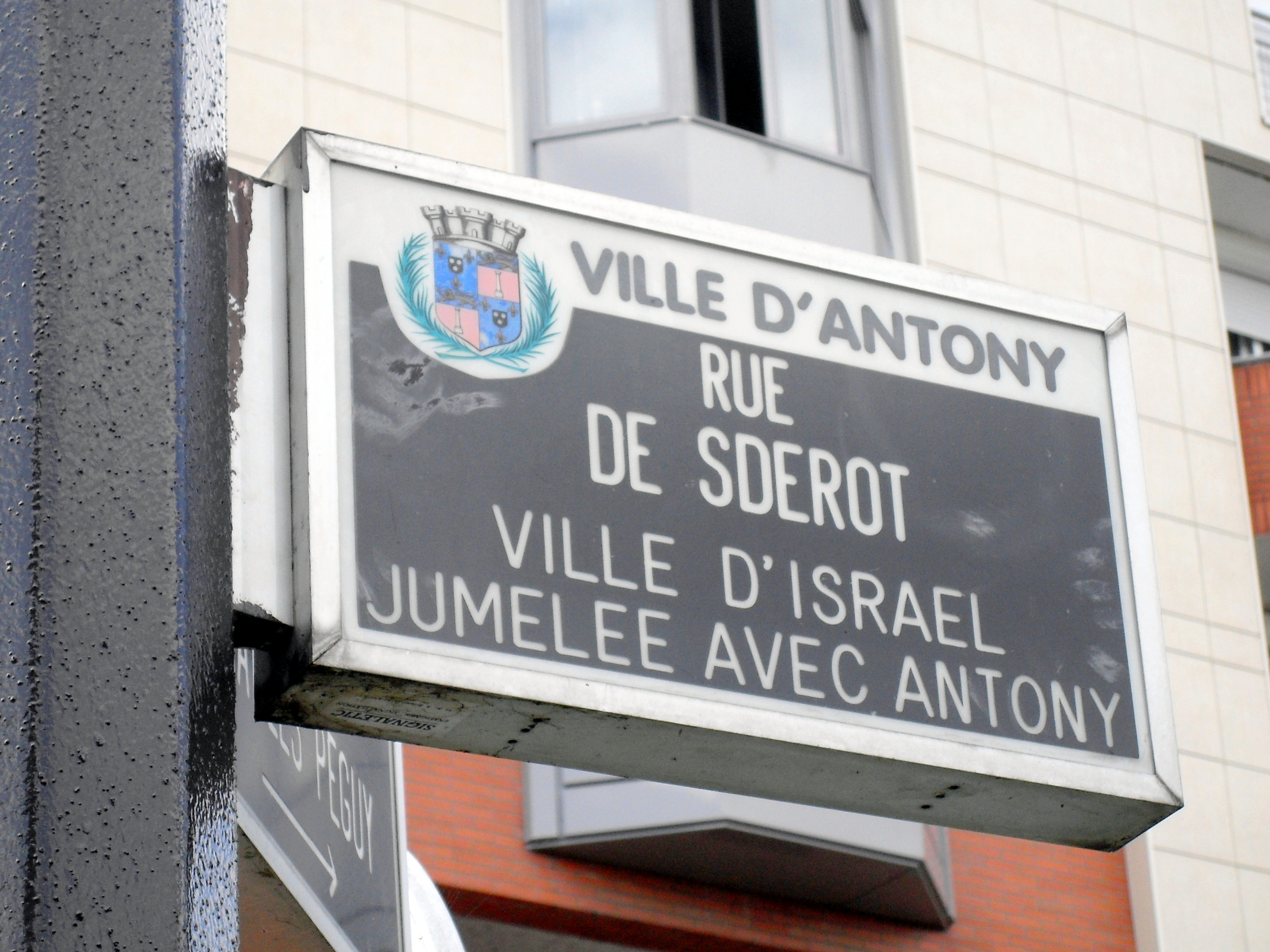
Sderot Street in Antony

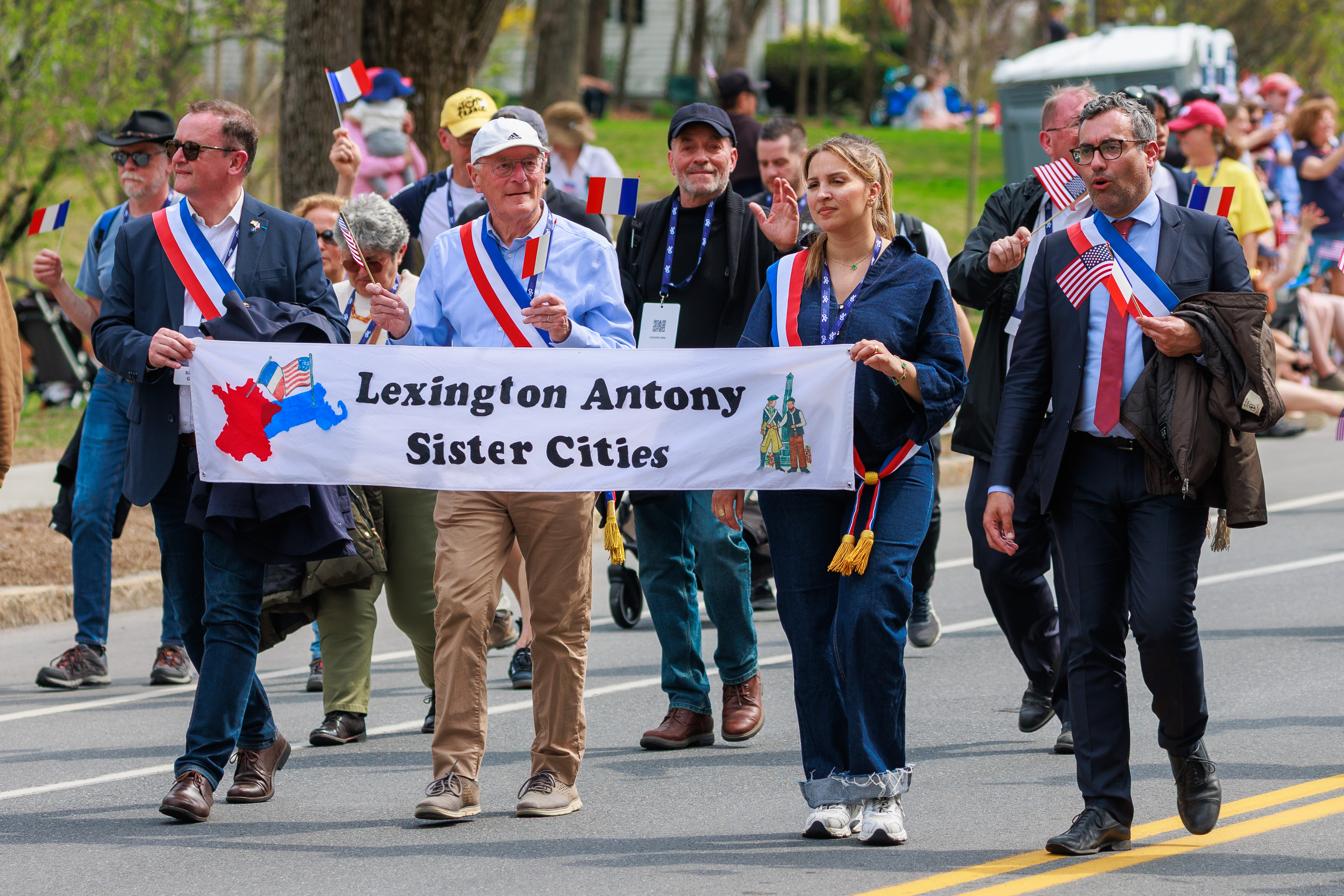
Antony dignitaries visit sister city Lexington, Massachusetts in 2025

Antony maintains close ties with many foreign cities. It was on 18 February 1985 that the first French city to sign a twinning agreement with the Afghan resistance against the Soviet invasion during the war in Afghanistan (1979-1989) was signed. It united Antony with Paghman, a district on the outskirts of Kabul but has not been pursued with the new authorities. The René Descartes School of Antony organizes annual exchanges between Antony and its two twin towns: Lexington in the United States and Reinickendorf in Germany.

Antony is twinned with:

- Antelias, Lebanon (2018)
- Collegno, Italy (1961)
- Davtashen (Yerevan), Armenia (2015)
- Eleftheroupoli, Greece (2000)
- Hammam-Lif, Tunisia (1969)
- Lewisham, England, United Kingdom (1967)
- Lexington, United States (1990)
- Olomouc, Czech Republic (1995)
- Protvino, Russia
- Reinickendorf (Berlin), Germany (1966)
- Sderot, Israel (1984)

== Demography ==
The inhabitants of the commune are known as Antoniens or Antoniennes in French.

Historical population

| Year | Pop. | ±% p.a. |
|---|---|---|
| 1793 | 1,223 | — |
| 1800 | 1,100 | −1.50% |
| 1806 | 1,028 | −1.12% |
| 1821 | 1,170 | +0.87% |
| 1831 | 1,182 | +0.10% |
| 1836 | 1,336 | +2.48% |
| 1841 | 1,360 | +0.36% |
| 1846 | 1,347 | −0.19% |
| 1851 | 1,328 | −0.28% |
| 1856 | 1,359 | +0.46% |
| 1861 | 1,650 | +3.96% |
| 1866 | 1,753 | +1.22% |
| 1872 | 1,497 | −2.60% |
| 1876 | 1,525 | +0.46% |
| 1881 | 1,620 | +1.22% |
| 1886 | 1,872 | +2.93% |
| 1891 | 1,967 | +0.99% |
| 1896 | 2,533 | +5.19% |
| 1901 | 3,068 | +3.91% |

| Year | Pop. | ±% p.a. |
|---|---|---|
| 1906 | 3,477 | +2.53% |
| 1911 | 4,490 | +5.25% |
| 1921 | 7,549 | +5.33% |
| 1926 | 12,468 | +10.56% |
| 1931 | 17,645 | +7.19% |
| 1936 | 19,780 | +2.31% |
| 1946 | 21,233 | +0.71% |
| 1954 | 24,512 | +1.81% |
| 1962 | 46,483 | +8.33% |
| 1968 | 56,638 | +3.35% |
| 1975 | 57,540 | +0.23% |
| 1982 | 54,610 | −0.74% |
| 1990 | 57,771 | +0.71% |
| 1999 | 59,855 | +0.39% |
| 2007 | 61,761 | +0.39% |
| 2012 | 61,624 | −0.04% |
| 2017 | 62,570 | +0.31% |
| 2023 | 64,263 | +0.45% |

Source: EHESS and INSEE

=== Distribution of Age Groups ===
The population of the town is relatively young.

Population by age of Antony, 2023 (%)

| 80+ | 4.5 |
| 65–79 | 11.7 |
| 55–64 | 9.6 |
| 40–54 | 16.7 |
| 25–39 | 20.1 |
| 15–24 | 21.2 |
| 0–14 | 16.1 |

Total: 99.9

| male |

| female |

Source: INSEE

Population by age of Hauts-de-Seine, 2023 (%)

| 90+ | 4.8 |
| 75–89 | 10.8 |
| 60–74 | 11.1 |
| 45–59 | 20.5 |
| 30–44 | 22.5 |
| 15–29 | 12.4 |
| 0–14 | 17.9 |

Total: 100

| male |

| female |

Source: INSEE

== Economy ==
The town has a branch of the Paris Chamber of Commerce.

=== Incomes of the population and taxation ===
In 2004, 818 households in Antony were liable for the Solidarity tax on wealth (ISF) and the average amount of this tax in Antony was €3,857 per year against €5,683 per year for the national average. The average wealth of Antonians liable for ISF was €1,295,062.

In 2008, there were 1,463 households in Antony liable for the Solidarity tax on wealth (ISF) and the average amount of this tax in Antony was €3,634 per year and the average wealth of Antonians liable for ISF was €1,406,852.

In 2010 the median household income tax was €42,583, placing Antony at 1456th out of the 31,525 communes in France with more than 39 households.

=== Employment ===
The commune of Antony is part of the employment zone of Paris. The total working population of the commune is 30,758. The rate of employment between 15 and 64 years old is 70.4%. There are 2,793 unemployed. In 2017 Antony had an unemployment rate of 9.1% which was lower than the national average which was 13.9%.

Distribution of employment by industry
| | Agriculture | Tradesmen, Shopkeepers, Entrepreneurs | Managers, Intellectuals | Intermediate professions | Employees | Workers |
|---|---|---|---|---|---|---|
| Antony | 0% | 4.3% | 33.3% | 28.8% | 23.7% | 9.8% |
Source of data: INSEE

The commune has an Employment centre for job searching.

=== Enterprises and businesses ===
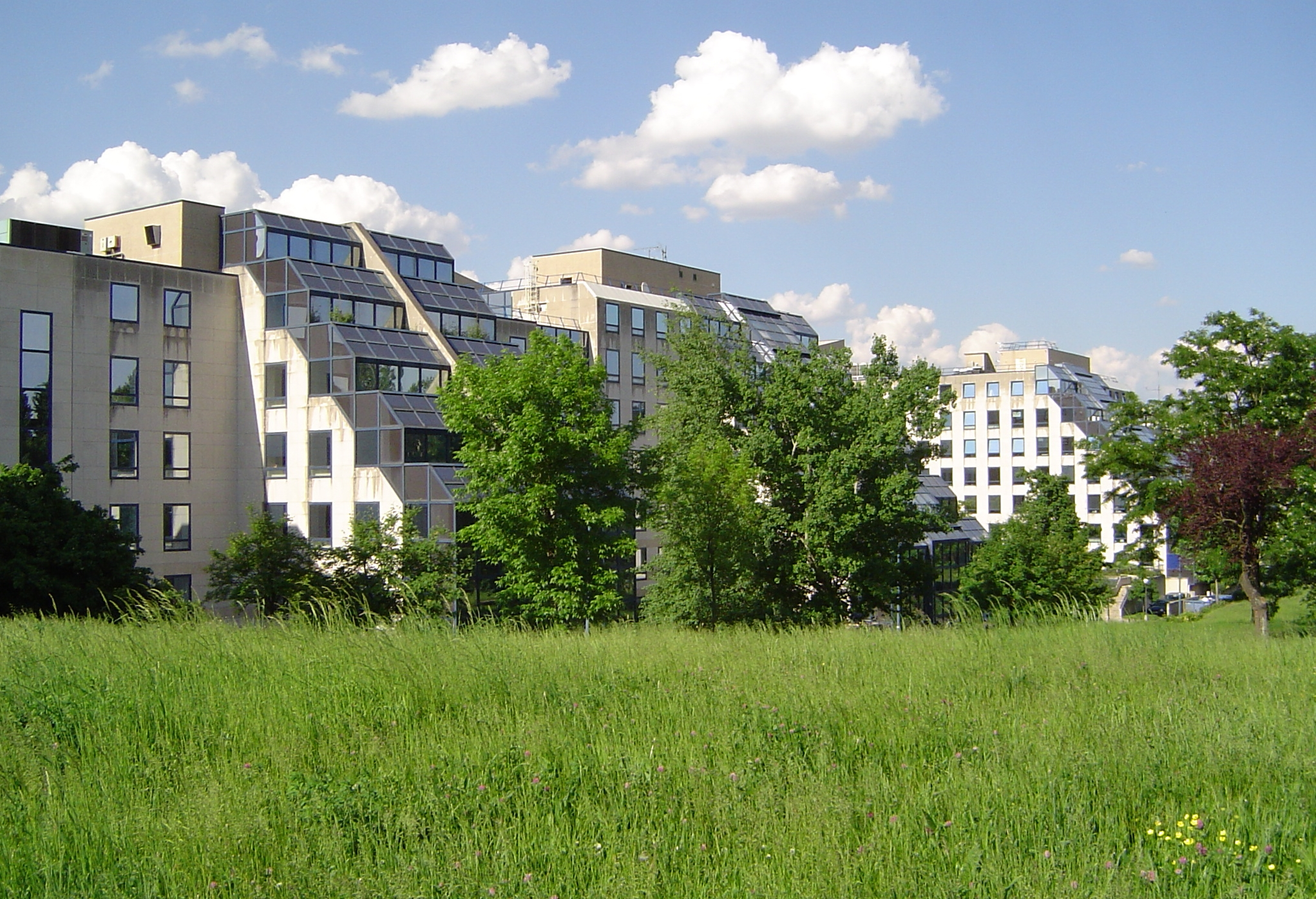
The High-tech office park

On 31 December 2015 the total number of establishments was 4,991, distributed as follows by business segment: 10 (0.2%) in agriculture (agriculture, forestry and fishing), 150 (3.0%) in industry, 352 (7.1%) in construction, 3,533 (70.8%) in trade, transport and other services of which 633 (12.7%) were in trade and car repairs, and finally 946 (19.0%) in the areas of public administration, education, health, and social action.

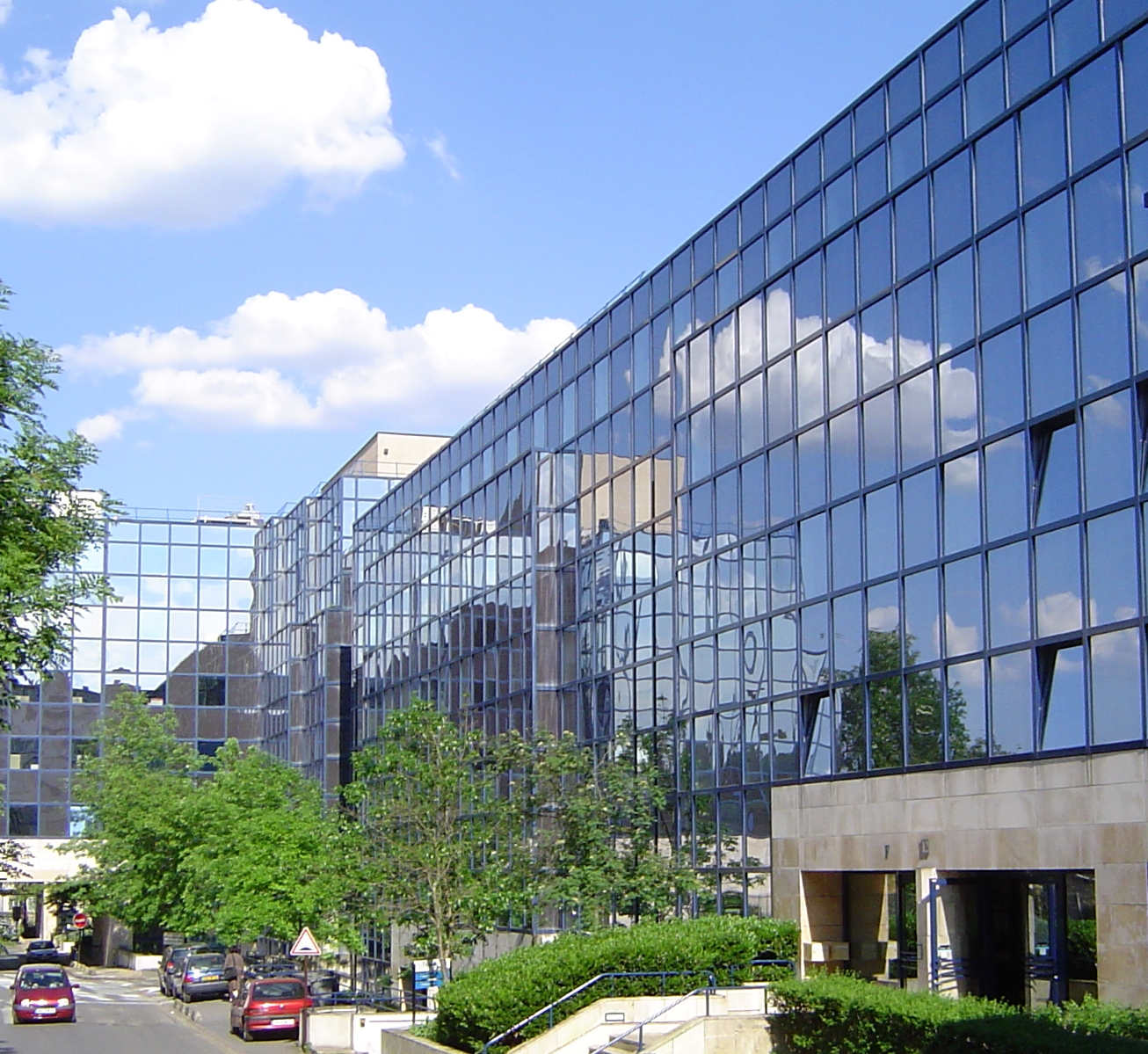
The centre of high-tech, along the A86 autoroute

The main areas of activity and research present in Antony are:

- The Cemagref or Research Institute for Agricultural Engineering and the Environment (originally the National Centre of Agricultural Machinery, Rural Engineering, Water and Forestry) was created in Paris in 1944 and moved to Antony in 1956. Since then, many centres have been established in the provinces. The centre in Antony particularly specialises in water quality.
- The Sanofi company, previously Sanofi-Aventis, created a research centre devoted to chemistry at Antony in 1952. This centre was established on an area of 6 hectares which was occupied by vegetable crops near the Croix de Berny. This centre was completely renovated between 1984 and 1988 on the plans of architects A. Chamussi and Alexandre Chemetoff. In September 2011 the group announced the regrouping, planned for 2014, of its commercial activities onto three sites (Paris, Massy, and Gentilly) which would imply the closure of the Antony site.
- Antonypole is a business park consisting of an old industrial area built in the south of the city in 1970 and a former high-tech park built in 1980. In 2008, this business park included large institutions in the areas of health, research, and precision electronics, such as: Dräger Medical, Essilor, Siemens, Stallergenes, Air Liquide Medical Systems, Vannier Photolec etc. Priority is given today to the installation of high value-added businesses wishing to settle in the south of Paris.
- The crossroads of Croix de Berny where several companies settled in 2008 includes the headquarters of the Pomona company and Chronopost. Verisure set up its headquarters here in 2020.

Antony market dates back to François I who, in 1545, instituted weekly fairs on Thursdays in Antony. It was moved from the footpaths on Rue Mounié to the Firmin Gémier Square and settled on the site of the city centre in 1957. This is one of the two most important markets in the south of Paris. The grand hall was completely rebuilt between 2003 and 2006.

== Facilities ==
=== Education ===
Antony is in the Academy of Versailles.

==== Schools ====
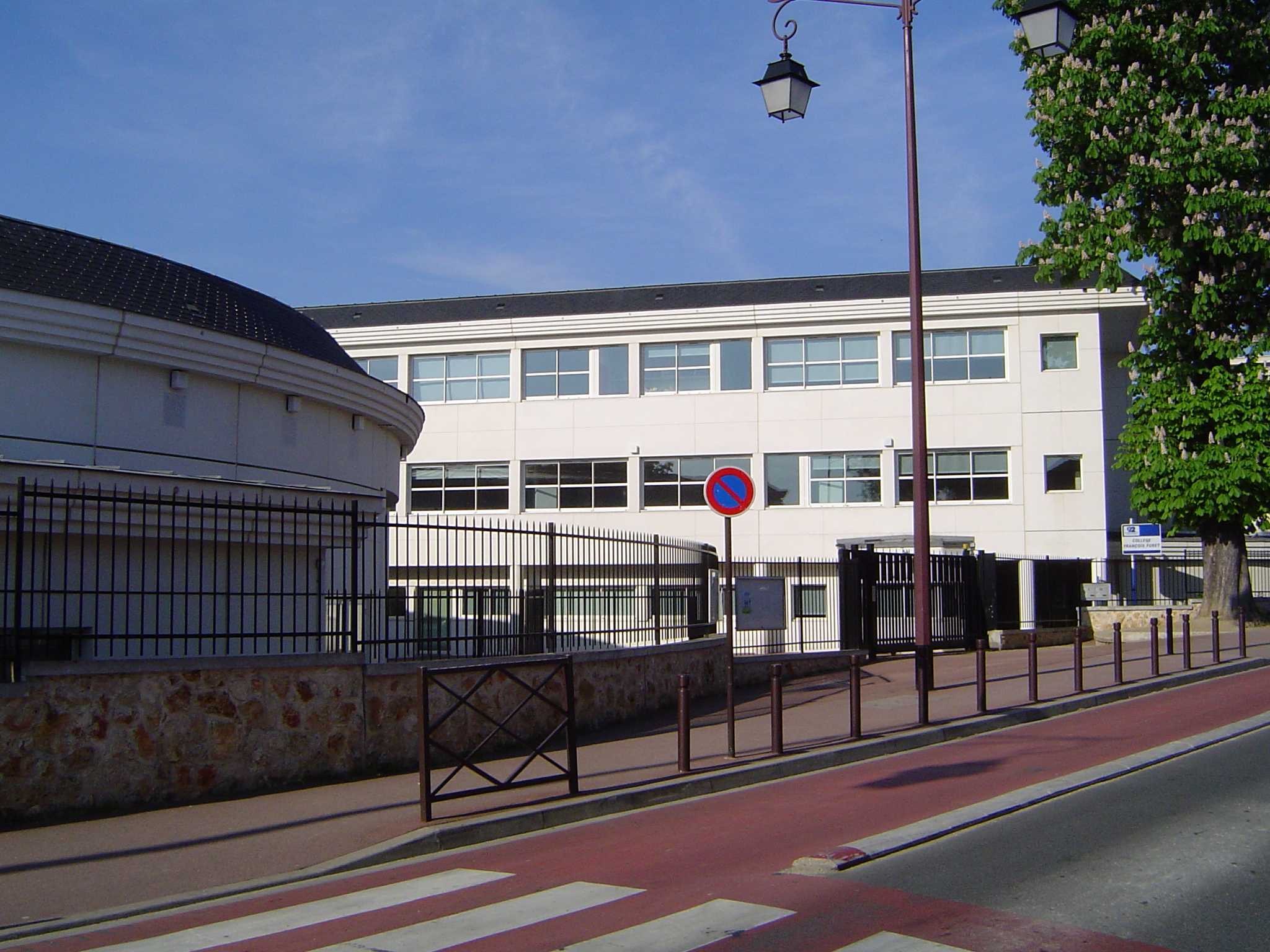
The new François-Furet College

The city administers 15 kindergartens and 13 communal elementary schools serving approximately 5,300 children and whose names come from districts (La Fontaine, Les Rabats, Noyer-Doré, Val-de-Bièvre) or illustrious men (Paul Bert, Edmond Blanguernon, Ferdinand Buisson, André Chénier, André Dunoyer de Segonzac, Jules Ferry, Anatole France, Jean Moulin, Adolphe Pajeaud, André Pasquier, Alfred Velpeau, and Jean Zay). The department manages five colleges and the Île-de-France region two schools. The Anne Frank College building, built in 1978–1980, is a very original building, the result of "politics of models": the municipality had to choose one of the models the Ministry proposed and asked two architects (Jean Nouvel and Gilbert Lézenès) to adapt the model according to their creative inspiration and constraints of the terrain.

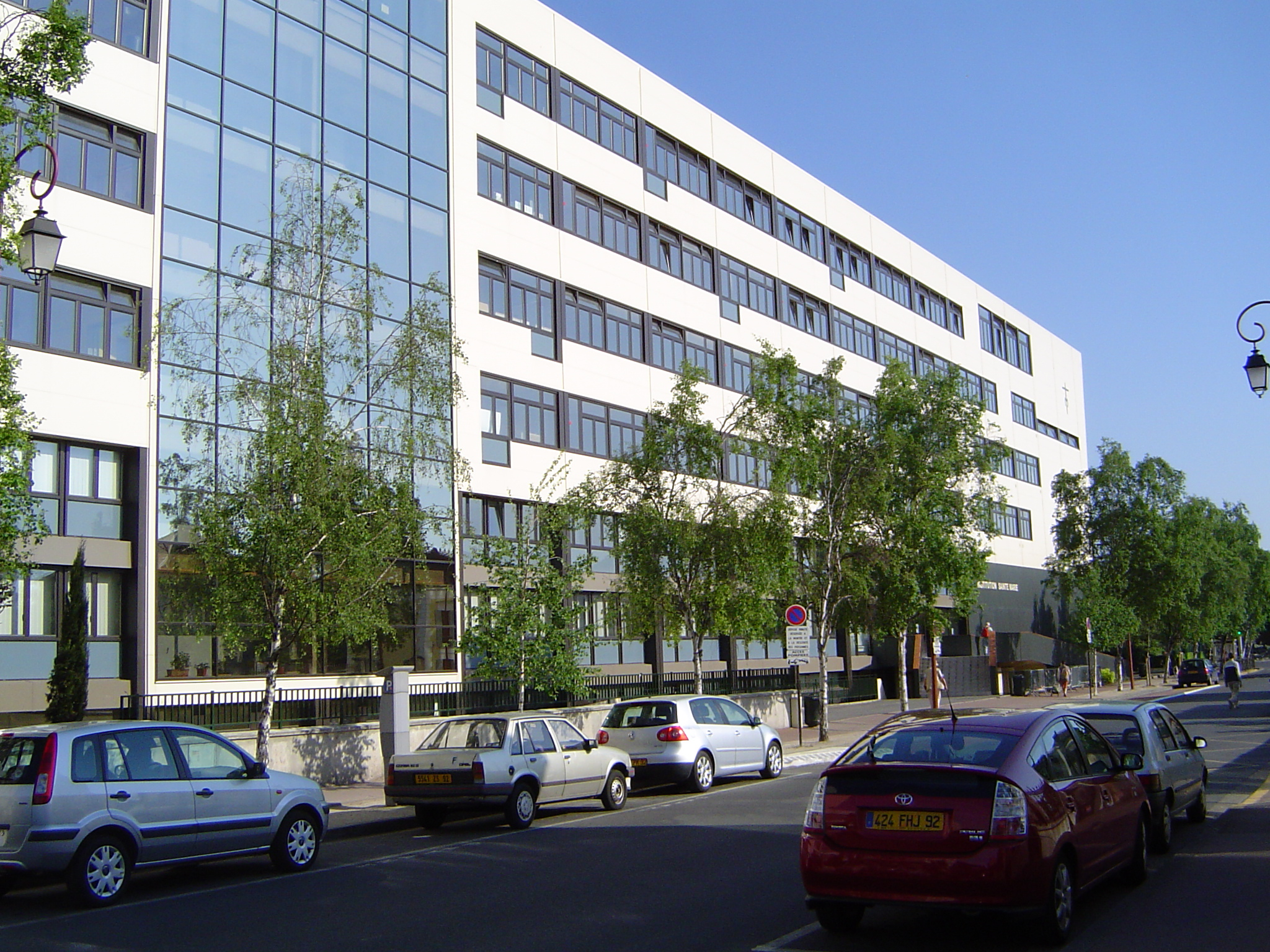
The Institution Sainte-Marie d'Antony

Antony also three private schools: the Ozar Hatorah Jewish School, the New School of Antony whose teaching methods rely on the contributions of active methods of teaching by project and institutional teaching, and the Institution Sainte-Marie of Antony which is a Catholic private school under contract of association with the State and run by the Marianists that has had 3,200 students for several years, making it France's largest private institution.

==== Higher Education ====
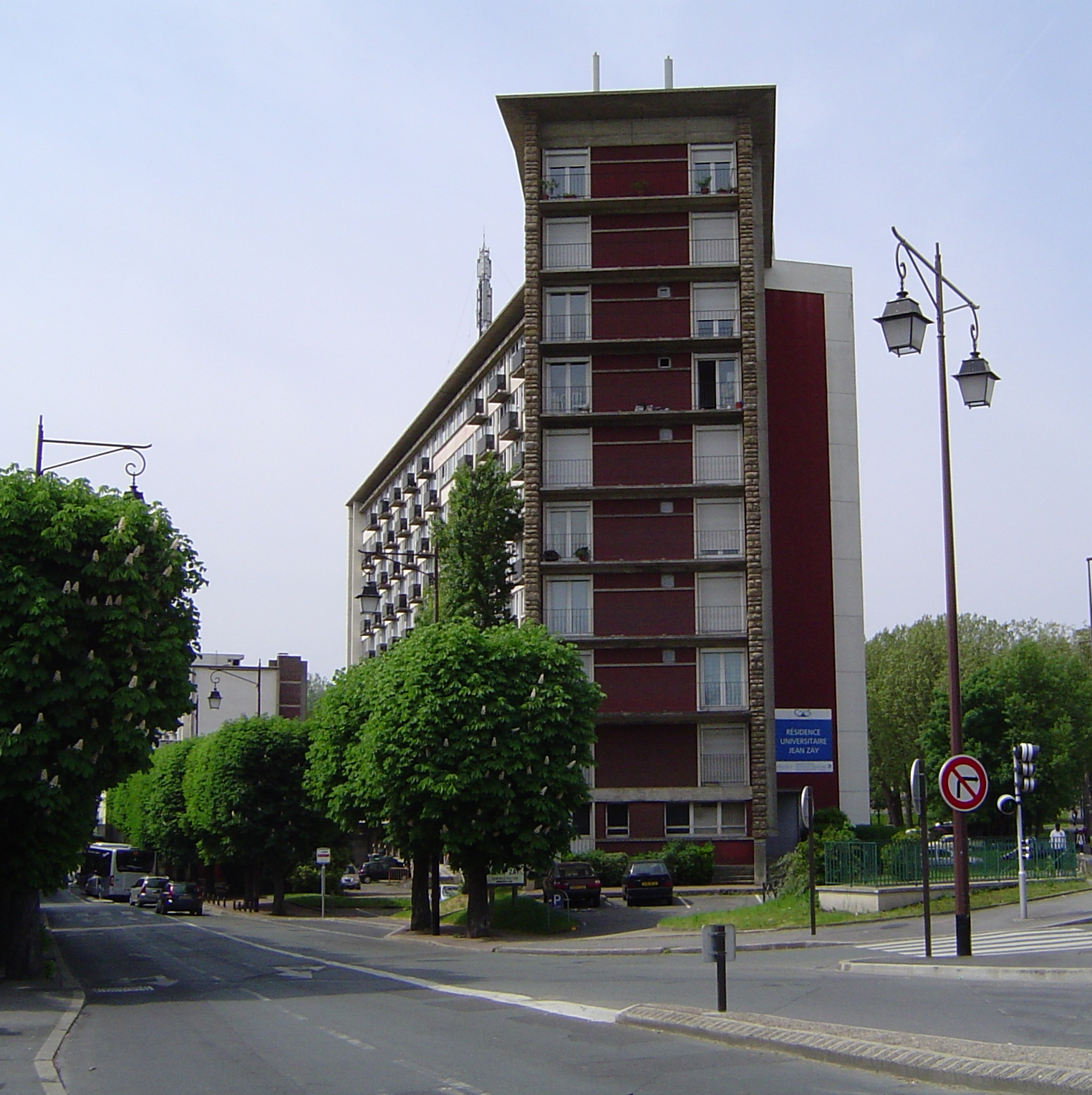
One of the buildings of the university residence.

Antony is the seat of the Arc en Ciel - Jean Trubert School, a private higher technical school specializing in training in illustration and comics. Arc en Ciel - Jean Trubert School initiated the creation of the diploma course "Certification of cartoonist and illustrator" which is registered at the Répertoire national des certifications professionnelles (NCPR). This diploma recognized by the State for Level III sanctioned training of two or three years.

Two Institut Universitaire de Formation des Maîtres have been established in Antony: the IUFM Val-de-Bièvre and the IUFM Léon Jouhaux. All disciplines for teaching at professional schools are prepared on the training site of IUFM of Antony Jouhaux. Moreover, thanks to its hotel and restaurant-supply department, it prepares courses and teaching for jobs in hotels.

The IUFM Val de Bièvre, meanwhile, was closed down in September 2011, only the COSOM (group of gyms) is still active.

Antony is known for its Jean-Zay university residence whose existence is regularly questioned: Patrick Devedjian, the mayor of Antony for 20 years, saw it as a "cyst".

Planned in 1945 its construction was decided on in 1952. With 2,500 rooms, it is one of Europe's largest student housing complexes. Open to the students from 1 December 1955, it initially offered 1,580 individual rooms (including 1,040 rooms for boys and 540 rooms for girls), 490 apartments for couples, and many common areas (a library, an auditorium, a sports complex, workrooms). The buildings are spread over ten acres between the town centre and Sceaux Park. From the outset the residence welcomed students from around the world. At the height of its activity, it had three kindergartens, a school, a supermarket, and 50 different nationalities. The new sub-prefecture buildings were constructed in 1989 partly on the grounds of the residence after the demolition of one of its main buildings. The new local plan adopted in 2008 creates a "placeholder" in the hands of the RUA to create an avenue between the city centre and the Parc de Sceaux: achieving this project would result in the demolition of at least one building of the Residence. This project is very controversial because of the shortage of student accommodation in Île-de-France. In 2008, the Minister for Universities and President of the General Council of Hauts-de-Seine considered the "transfer" of the RUA, which the student union strongly opposed. In 2009, the property of the RUA was transferred to the Agglomeration Community of Hauts-de-Bièvre. In 2010, the buildings were demolished. In 2011, the municipality of Antony and the Agglomeration of Hauts-de-Bièvre presented a plan to reorganise the right-of-way by Jean Nouvel.

=== Health ===
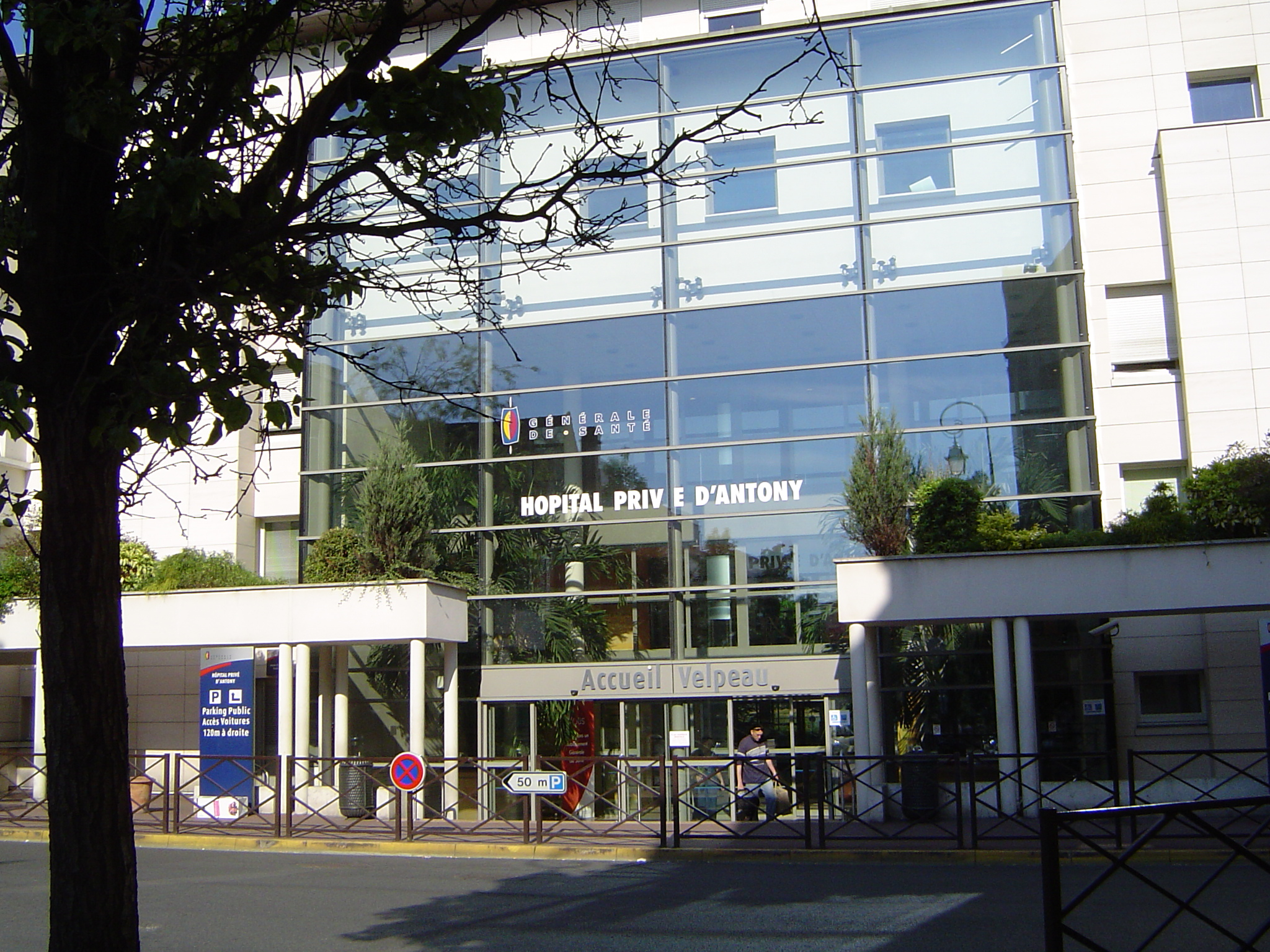
The main entrance to the private hospital in Antony

Antony has some of the best healthcare in Île-de-France: both in number of general practitioners (2nd in the region with 1.52 physicians to 1,000 inhabitants) and specialists (3rd in the region with 2.19 for 1,000 inhabitants).

Antony has a modern private hospital built in 2002. It brings together a range of services over an area of 30,000 m2 and provides (as at 1 April 2010) a capacity of 417 beds which makes it the largest private hospital in Île-de-France. This hospital resulted from the successive mergers of clinics in the area:

- the House of Health of Antony
- the Clinic of Fresnes
- the Clinic of la Providence in Antony
- the Clinique Ambroise-Pare in Bourg-la-Reine
- the Clinic of Millers in Bagneux
- the Clinic of the Parc in Bourg-la-Reine
- the Clinic of the Bois de Verrières in Antony
- the Clinic of Hauts-de-Seine
- the Maternity Clinic of Valleys in Chatenay-Malabry

The new hospital opened on 28 November 2002 and was inaugurated on 14 May 2003 by Jean-François Mattei, Minister of Health, and Patrick Devedjian, Minister for Local Liberties. It employs 740 staff and 250 private doctors in 30 specialities.

Antony also has the Erasmus public health facility. This psycho-therapeutic hospital is built in a 5.5-hectare park and opened its doors on 17 May 1982 in new premises. Since 1993 it has included 21 associated institutions from Île-de-France. This hospital specializes in the treatment of mental disorders in all ages. It aims primarily to accommodate the residents from the centre and south of the Hauts-de-Seine department. The tasks assigned to it are varied: prevention, diagnosis, care, teaching, and research. It employs 600 staff.

Besides these two hospitals Antony has two specialised educational institutions: The Elizabeth Centre of Panouse-Debré (motor rehabilitation for very young children with physical disabilities) and the Psychotherapeutic Specialised Teaching Centre for children with serious mental disorders. There are also several specialised institutions such as the Alcoholic Cure Centre (alcohol and tobacco).

=== Sports ===
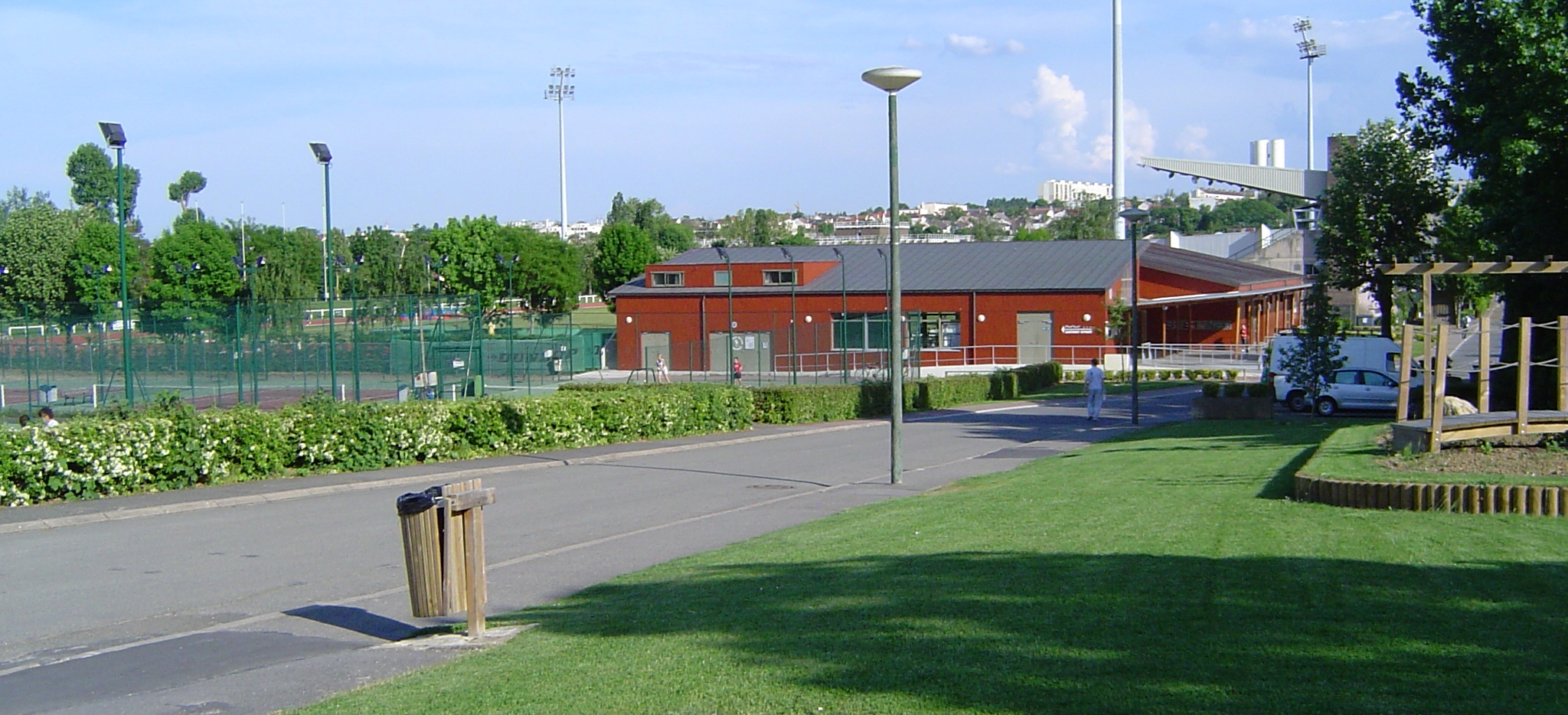
The Georges-Suant Stadium

Numerous sports associations are grouped under the Antony Sports Council. There are 40 disciplines in 40 halls and stadiums with the main venues being:

- the Municipal Stadium Georges-Suant (formerly called the Stadium Salvador Allende) at Croix de Berny:
- Heller Park
- the Velpeau stadium
- the Lionel Terray sports centre
- the Pierre de Coubertin gymnasium
- the Rabats gymnasium
- the La Fontaine gymnasium
- the André Malraux Centre
- the Jacques Cadet enclosiure
- the Anatole France gymnasium
- the Pajeaud gymnasium
- 6 basketball courts with free access
- sports facilities in the Parc de Sceaux
- halls and tennis courts in the University Residence
- the Pony Club
- a bowling alley
- a skate Park
- 3 swimming pools (Lionel-Terray, Iris, Grenouillère)

Every year in July, Antony organises an International Disabled sports tournament in the Parc de Sceaux (Grenouillère) which attracts the best players in the world.

Among the sports clubs at the end of the 2011–2012 season Antony Athletics 92, with 492 members and had 5 sections, moved to N1C (among 60 best French clubs) which made it the 2nd club in Hauts-de-Seine, 9th in Île-de-France and 69th of 1729 in the national rankings.

The Antony Sports Rugby club plays in Fédérale 3.

The Antony Sport Football Association, founded in 1948, is an official partner of the Paris Saint-Germain Football Club and plays in the regional football league (DSR).

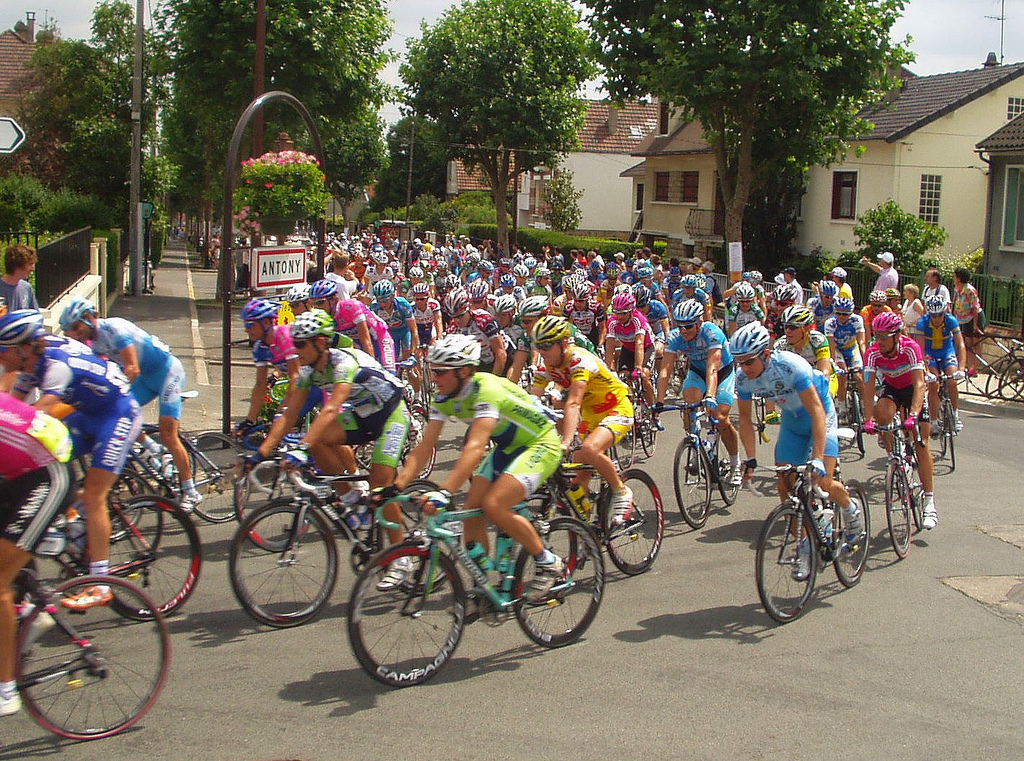
Antony, "stage-town" for the Tour de France in July 2006

In 1928 at the sports complex called Stadium of the croix de Berny or "Sports Union Metropolitan": Gaston Vrolix, chief engineer of the RATP, created the Metropolitan Sports Union (currently USMT). He built a sports complex on the site of part of the former racetrack at La Croix de Berny where he transformed stables into locker rooms. The first phase was started in 1928 along the RN186 and included: football, rugby, hockey, basketball, tennis, a swimming pool, playground, gym, and a shooting range. The second phase was built around 1932 to the north: rugby pitches, tennis courts, and an athletic stadium. The third phase included a fronton for basque pelota and a velodrome was built in 1938 by a Dutch architect (a replica in concrete of the wooden Vigorelli track in Milan). This velodrome had to be rebuilt to accommodate cycling events in case the city of Paris was chosen for the 1992 Summer Olympics. The new local plan, adopted in 2008, includes the construction in a portion of this site of office buildings to finance the rehabilitation of all sports facilities of the USMT. The rugby team Racing Métro 92 was born from the collaboration of the Racing Club de France and the U.S. METRO which played its matches in the Top 14 in Colombes and trained at the Croix de Berny for several years before recently joining Le Plessis-Robinson.

The Tour de France passed through the streets of Antony in July 1999, July 2007, and in 2010. It was a "stage-town" for the beginning of the 20th stage of the Tour in 2006.

=== Media ===
Besides the traditional "paper" version, since October 2006 the city has published the magazine in an audio version (on CD) for the blind or visually impaired.

A wired network distributing radio broadcasting services and television has covered the city since 1988. Following the advent of digital terrestrial television, the CSA has chosen channels to broadcast via TNT-Île-de-France: channel 21 sharing Demain IDF, BDM TV, Cinaps TV, Télé Bocal; channel 22 IDF1; channel 23 NRJ Paris (ex-LTF); and channel 24 Cap 24 (ex-Côté Seine). Since 24 September 2007 the commune can also receive through TNT the Group France Télévisions chain: France Ô, available on channel 20.

In October 2007 Antony communes established a Wi-Fi network: internet terminals are accessible to all and allow free connection in various public places.

Antony has several local newspapers. The weekly newspaper Antony-Hebdo is the newspaper of the municipal opposition led by André Aubry, a former senator for Hauts-de-Seine and former PCF mayor of Antony. This newspaper is allowed to publish judicial and legal notices in the Arrondissement of Antony.

The periodical Présence (Journal of Catholic communities of Antony) is distributed three times a year in all mailboxes. One of the groups of the municipal opposition Antony Plus publishes Antony Public Place (formerly: Agora).

Three times a year a local association publishes the Journal de la Fontaine St-Ex

The "Primaveras" Association publishes a monthly newspaper in the Marne quarter.

=== Religion ===
Antony has Catholic, Protestant, Jewish, and Muslim places of worship.

==== Catholic worship ====
Since January 2010 Antony commune has been part of the deanery of Pointe Sud, one of the nine deaneries of the Diocese of Nanterre.

Within this deanery, the places of Catholic worship relate to the four parishes of Montrouge.

Places of worship are:

- for the parish of Saint-Saturnin: the Church of Saint-Saturnin, the Sainte-Odile Church, Chapel of Saint Mary Mother of the Church
- for the parish of Saint-Francis: the church of St. Francis
- for the parish of Saint-Jean-Porte-latine: the church of Saint-Jean-Porte-Latine and the Chapel Sainte-Jeanne de Chantal
- for the parish of Saint-Maxime: Church Saint-Maxime.

Also places of worship exist within religious communities located in Antony:

- Little Sisters of the Assumption
- the Marianists
- Sisters of St. Joseph of Cluny
- Sisters of Saint-Raphaël (Our Lady of Charity)

Finally there is a community of Vietnamese sisters.

==== Protestant worship ====
An Evangelical Baptist Church brings together the Baptist community in Antony. Neighbouring communes have places of worship for the communities related to the Reformed Church of France (in Chatenay-Malabry) and the Evangelical Lutheran Church of France (in Bourg-la-Reine).

==== Jewish worship ====
A synagogue managed by the Jewish Consistory of Paris Association is located in Antony.

==== Muslim worship ====
The Cultural Association of Muslims of Antony administers a mosque in Antony and the Ismaili Cultural Association of Antony has a prayer hall.

==== Tenrikyo worship ====
A Tenrikyo temple of worship is present at Antony. Tenrikyo is an ideological and religious movement from Japan. It is considered by the info-sects website to be a Buddhist sect.

== Sites and monuments ==
A large number of buildings and sites are registered as historical monuments. Below are some of the highlights of the heritage of Antony.

=== Civil Heritage ===
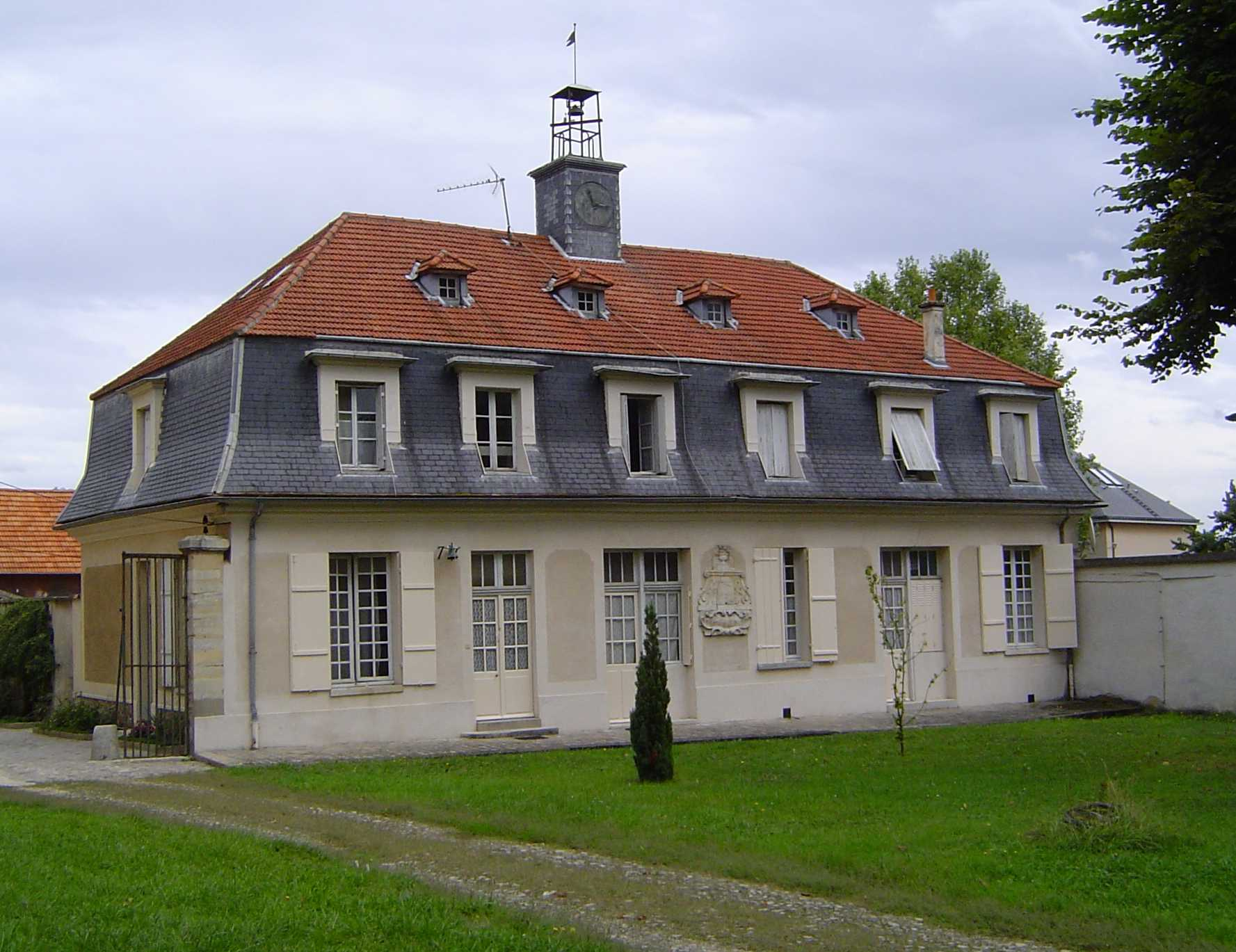
Old royal manufactory of waxes

The former Royal Manufactory of Waxes (1714) whose exact name was Manufacture d'Antony pour le blanchissage des cires & la fabrique des bougies (Manufacture of Antony for laundering of waxes & candle factory) is located at 14 Avenue du Bois-de-Verrières. The factory was founded in 1702 by Péan de Saint-Gilles and it became a royal factory in 1719. Its motto was Deo, regique laborant meaning "they (the drones) work for God and the King. The original building was built in 1714 where wax and tallow candles were produced for the Court of Versailles and other castles in the area. The enterprise left Antony for Bourg-la-Reine and still exists under the name of "Cire Trudon". The building is now occupied by the Sisters of St. Joseph of Cluny who settled there in 1890. The factory was built on this site to use the high quality water from the rivers which allowed candles to be produced with an exceptional whiteness.

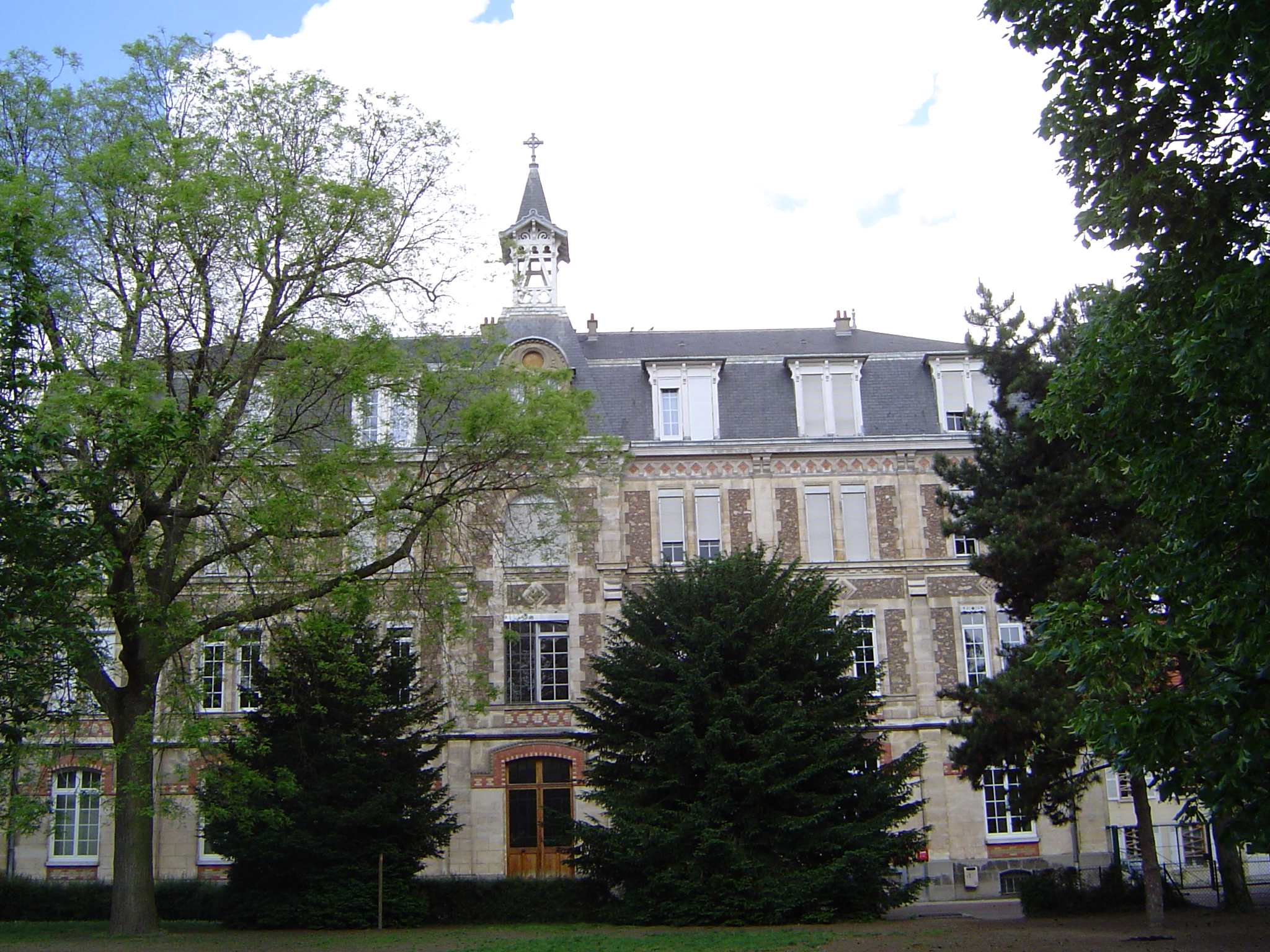
The House of Saint-John

The Maison Saint-Jean (House of Saint John) (1806) is a former Chénier property called La Belle Levantine. This building was built by Louis-Sauveur Chénier, the youngest son of Louis Chénier, and brother of André Chénier from plans by architect Georges Auguste Ranchon. In 1820 the house was purchased by Jean-Charles Persil, a Minister under Louis-Philippe, who died in 1870. In 1880, it became the property of four Parisian priests who, in 1898, built a building of brick and stone to serve as a Marianist seminary. After the expulsion of the Marianists the building was transformed into a guesthouse. The property was bought by the Marianists in 1965 to build the buildings for the Institution Sainte-Marie d'Antony.

=== Religious Heritage ===
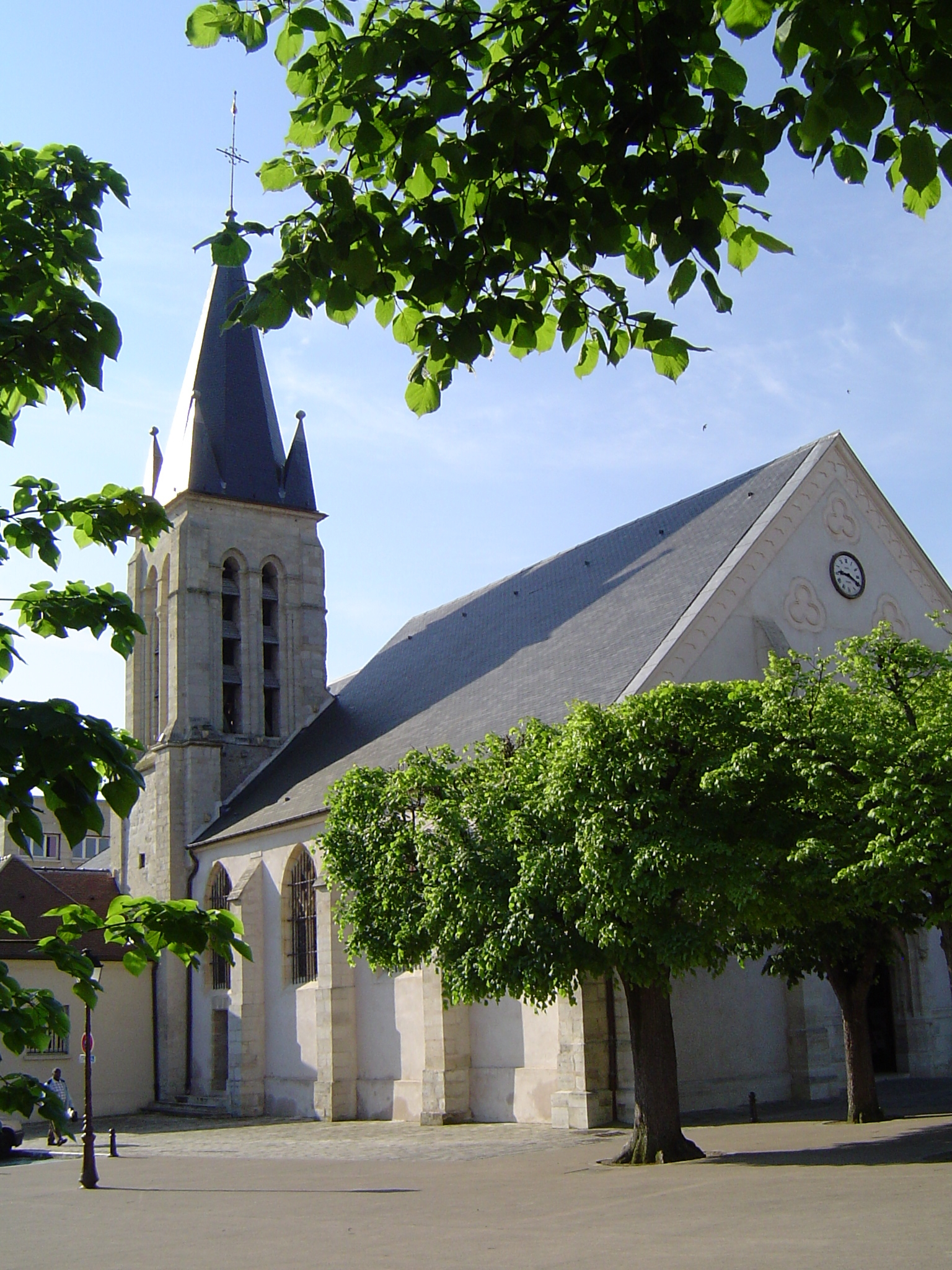
The Church of Saint-Saturnin

Religious architectural heritage is rich in Antony from a historical perspective with the Church of Saint-Saturnin having the oldest parts in Île-de-France dating from the Carolingian period through to churches with modern architecture.

The Church of Saint-Saturnin is "Located in an attractive square planted with linden trees on the site of the old cemetery, the church of Saint-Saturnin has a triple interest: historical, archaeological and artistic". Inside, in addition to the wash stand from the Carolingian period, there are stained glass windows from the late 19th - early 20th centuries. The choir is from the end of the 12th century, the bell tower from the 14th, the nave from the 15th century, and the south chapel is modern. The belfry supports four bells: the oldest, Charlotte Genevieve, from 1730. This monument has been undergoing major renovations in recent years. The rectory, on the church square, was restored in 1989. This church has been classified as a historical monument since 19 October 1928. In the "Holy Mary Mother of the Church" chapel of the Institution Sainte-Marie d'Antony, built in 1968 to plans by architects Georges Dengler and Zunz, there is a very large openwork brick wall - the work of master glassmaker Henri Martin-Granel and also a large ceramic mural 41 m2 in area, the work of Jacqueline Bechet-Ferber. The church contains a large number of items that are registered as historical objects.

The Church of Sainte-Jeanne-de-Chantal has a main building from the Colonial Exhibition of 1931. So that it would not be confused with the church of Sainte-Jeanne-de-Chantal in Paris, the qualifier "hors-le-murs" (Outside the Walls) was added to clarify that it was not within the walls of Paris. This building was renovated in 1954.

The Church of Saint-Jean-Porte-Latine (1967) was built between 1964 and 1967 on the plans of architects Pierre Pinsard and Hugo Vollmar. The church was consecrated to Catholic worship on 21 May 1967. It is dedicated to Saint Jean-Porte-latine, patron saint of the publishing industry. The "Urban signal", surmounted by a giant cross, was inaugurated on 6 January 2002.

The Church of Saint Francis of Assisi was built in 1972 on the plans of architect Paul Henry by the Œuvre des Chantiers du Cardinal (Construction work of the Cardinal. It was dedicated to the Catholic faith on 7 October 1972 by Monseigneur Jacques Delarue, Bishop of Nanterre.

The Church of Saint-Maxime was built from 1978 to 1980 by the Œuvre des Chantiers du Cardinal. It is also designed by the architect Paul Henry and was dedicated to the Catholic faith on 16 November 1980 by Monseigneur Jacques Delarue. It contains a large Statue of Saint Maxime (1939) which is registered as an historical object.

The Church of Sainte-Odile (1933) was built under the direction of architect Charles Venner by the Œuvre des Chantiers du Cardinal. There is a Bas-relief of Saint Odile (1933) which is registered as an historical object.

The Evangelical Baptist Church, of modern architecture with large windows, has been completely rebuilt under the development project of the Croix de Berny and inaugurated in March 2001.

=== Environmental heritage ===
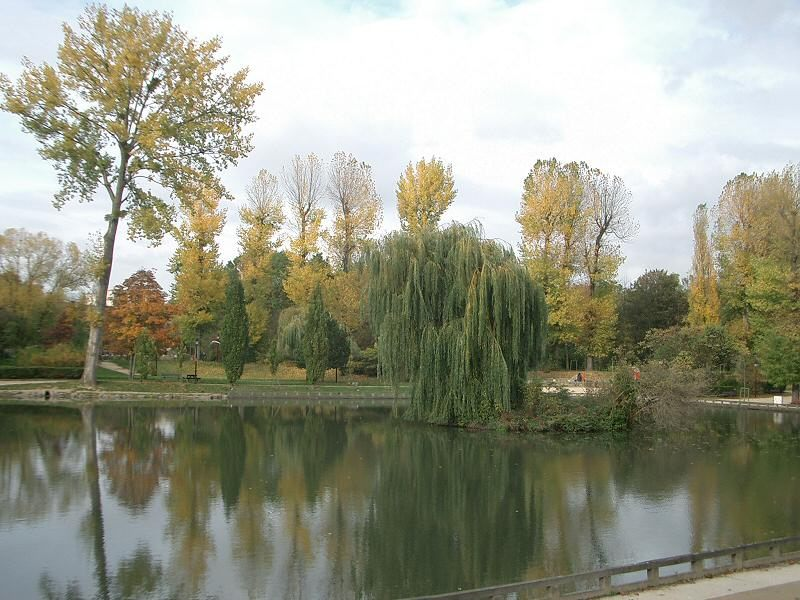
View of Heller Park

The policy of protecting and enhancing the environment makes Antony one of the greenest communes in Île-de-France: besides the Parc de Sceaux, there are 750,000 m2 of parks, woods, and leafy lanes. Antony has been labelled a "flowery city" with two flowers awarded since 2002 by the National Council of flowered towns and villages of France in the competition for cities and villages in bloom. The land in the region is particularly well suited for Wisteria which covers the houses in spring, as well as roses as in the names of the nearby communes of Fontenay-aux-Roses and L'Haÿ-les-Roses. Antony has several parks - the largest of which are:

- Parc de Sceaux (about 180 hectares of which 60 hectares are in the commune of Antony)
- Heller Park (9.6 ha)
- Raymond Sibille Park (1.4 ha)
- Bourdeau Park (1.2 ha)
- the green slopes of Godets (2.66 ha) and Paradis (2.2 ha)
- the green slopes of TGV (7 ha)
- Bois de Aurora (2.6 ha)

These parks are planted with trees "remarkable" for their size, age, history, botanical rarity, or which are particularly elegant or picturesque. The city is planted with over 50 different species. Inside Heller Park is the Antony Farm which allows children to play with pigs, cows, goats, and sheep as well as chickens, geese, and rabbits. It is managed by the pony club.

=== Cultural heritage ===
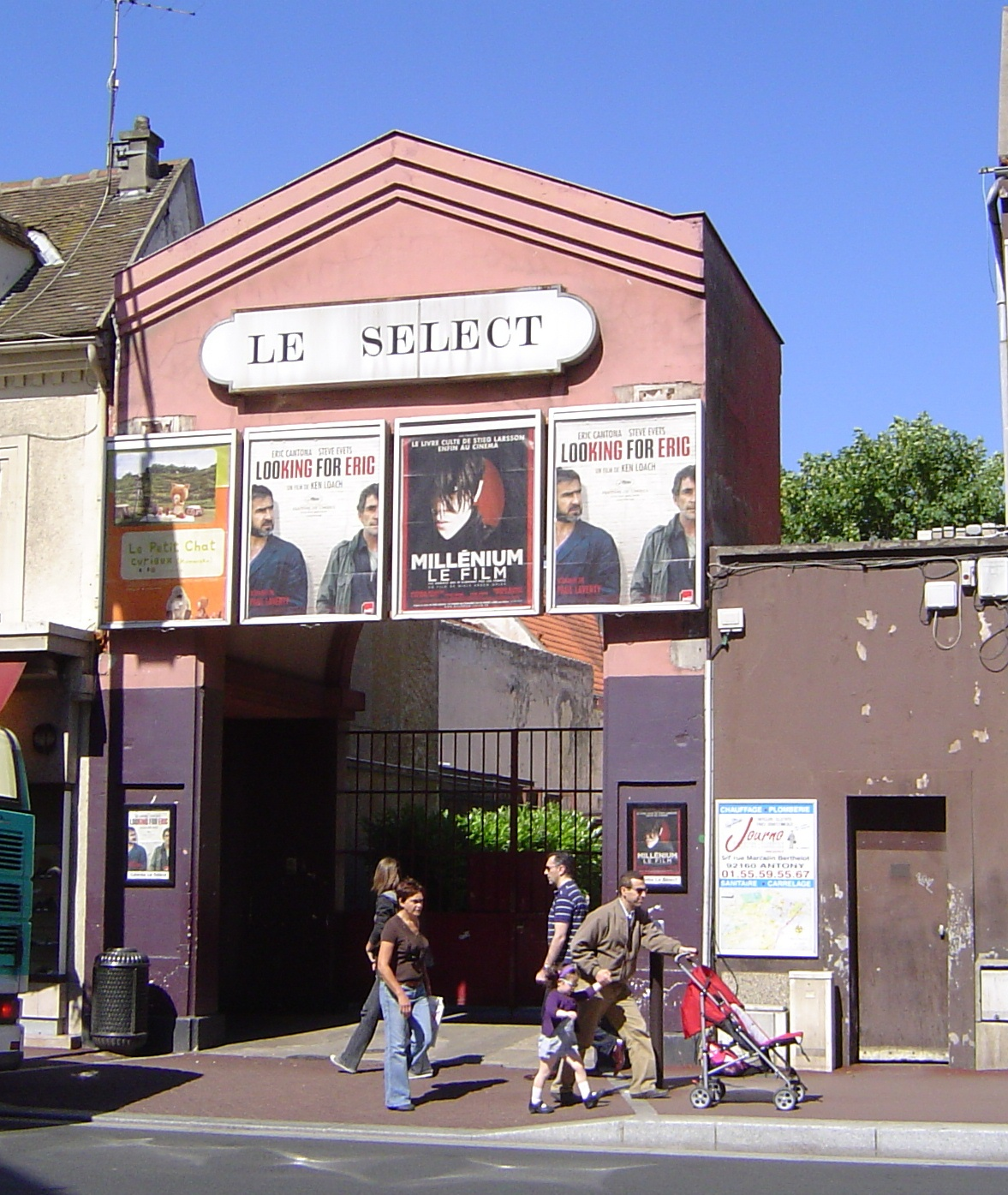
The former cinema "Le Select"

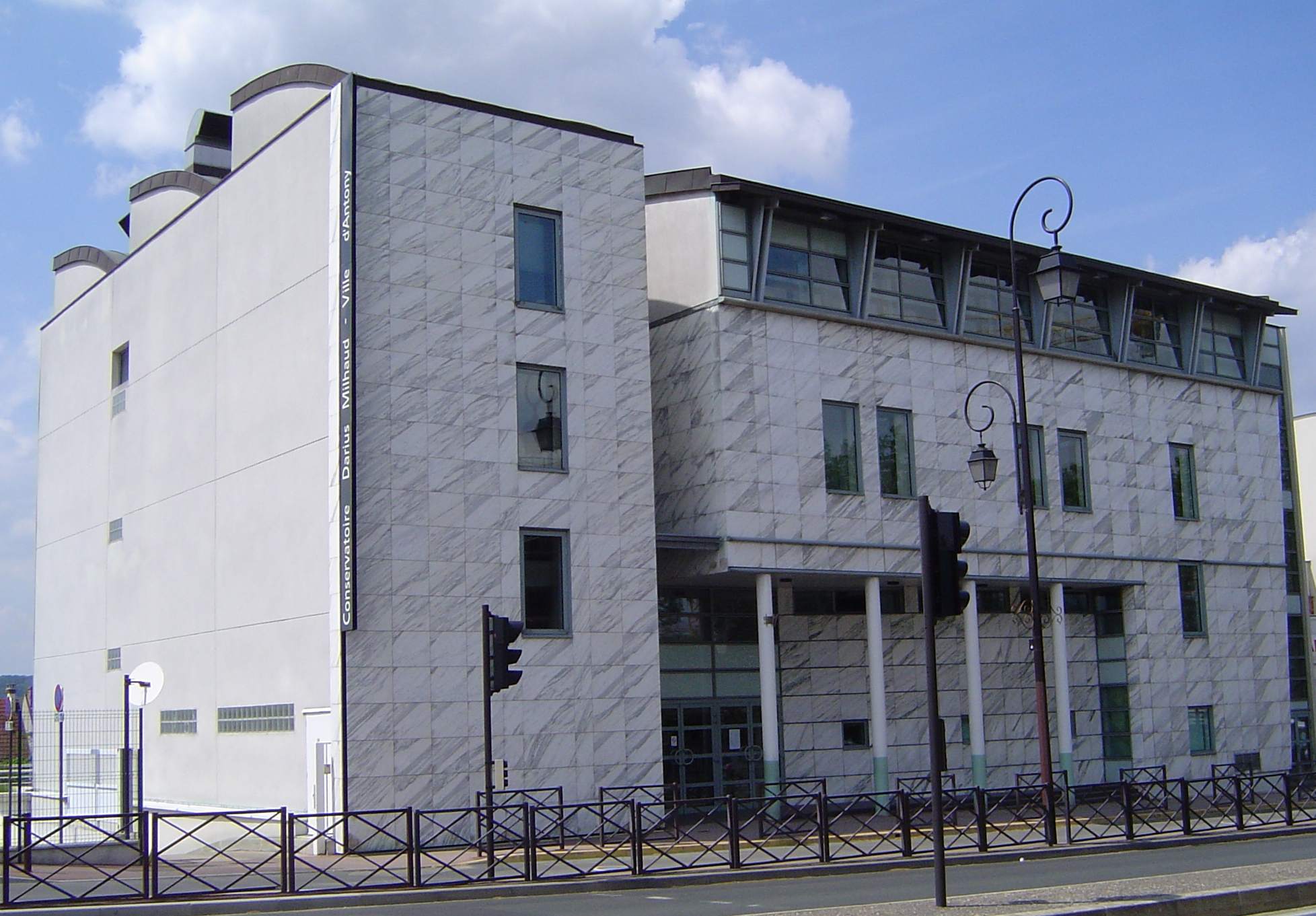
The Darius-Milhaud conservatory

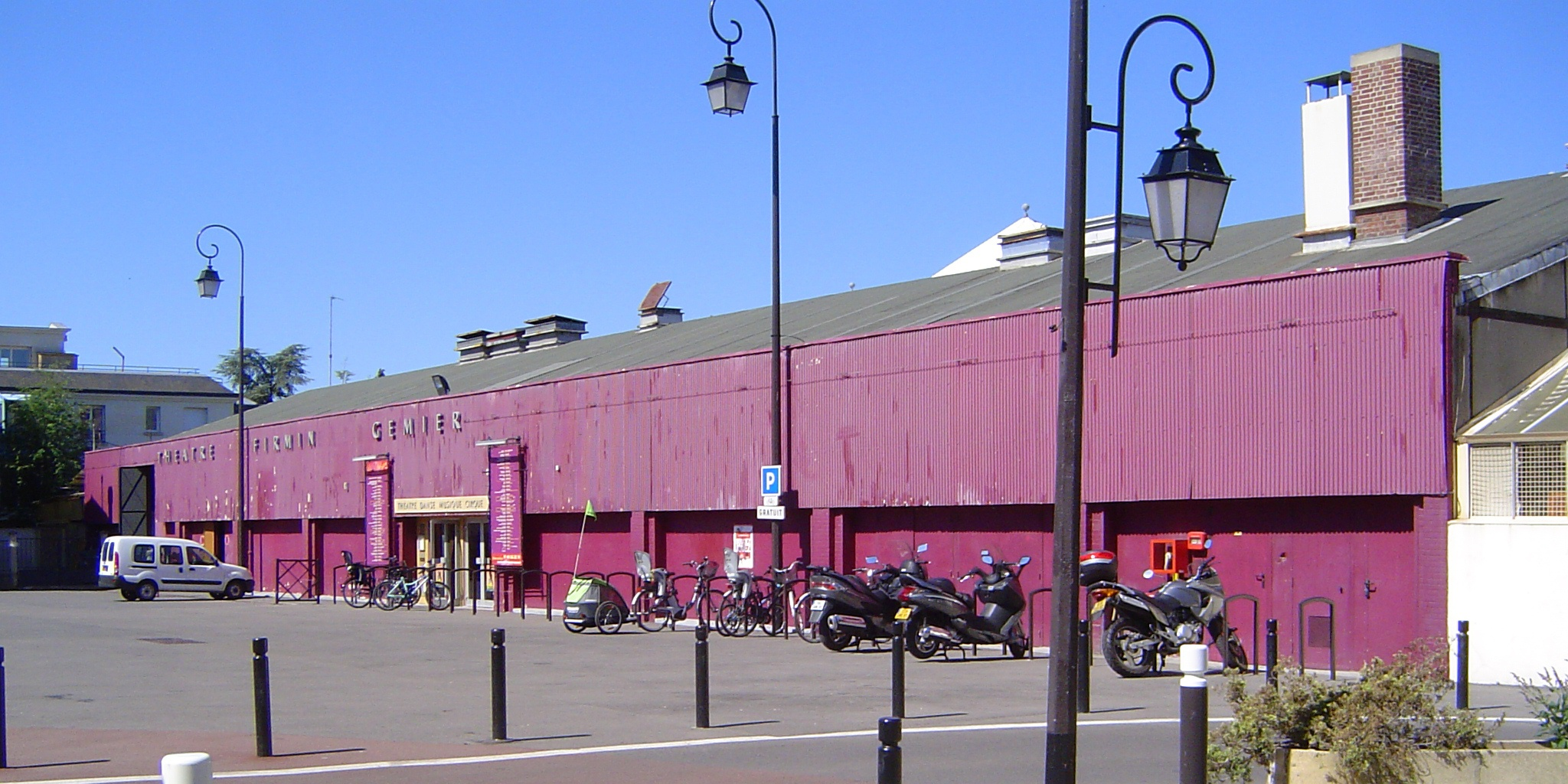
The former Firmin-Gémier theatre

At the beginning of the 20th century Antony had three cinemas including:

- the Family Palace (2 rue de Fresnes), built in 1922, operated until 1981
- L'Artistic, built in 1928, municipalized in 1981 and renamed Le Sélect Louis-Daquin and classed as an Art et Essai cinema
- the Ciné du Soleil-Levant (Cinema of the Rising Sun) (6 Rue du Soleil-Levant), built in 1930, renamed L'Eden in 1948, operated until the 1970s.

Until the summer of 2011 the only remaining cinema was Le Sélect. In view of its growing attendance, 49,000 in 1983, 100,000 in 1995, in 1995 the city studied the replacement of the cinema hall with a set of four halls on the same site. Local associations wished to maintain an ambitious and quality program. The principle to rebuild the cinema was adopted by the City Council in April 1997 but, given the technical difficulties related to the environment, the project has not yet been completed. On 28 January 2008 the cinema was honoured by the profession when Christine Beauchemin-Flot, its director, received the trophy for the Operator of the Year. This trophy is awarded every year by Le Film français, a weekly reference publication in the profession.

Scenes from the film Né de père inconnu (Born from an unknown father) by Maurice Cloche (1950) were shot in the Paul Manchon day nursery (demolished in the early 2000s).

In July 2011 Le Select closed for the beginning of construction of the new multiplex. Restarting of shows was planned for November of that year at the Firmin-Gémier Theatre but, on 29 September, the mayor announced to council that the auditorium was contaminated with asbestos and could not accommodate any film screenings, performances, or performing arts. Antony found itself without any major cultural venues until the construction of the new theatre and cinema was completed in 2013.

On 10 June 2012 a short-lived cinema opened in the Pajeaud quarter between the COSOM gymnasium and the Iris pool near Heller Park. In an innovative concept, this temporary cinema of 205 seats will be dismantled when the town centre theatre opens.

The current public library, built in 1990, has a large Braille workshop, one of the few in France to offer a large selection of books free of charge to the blind. In 1995 the city was also equipped with a new bookmobile which can carry 2,500 books. The bookmobile serves eleven stops in all quarters of Antony.

Antony has a conservatory (dependent on the Agglomeration Community of Hauts-de-Bièvre), approved by the Darius Milhaud State Conservatory, that every year has more than 1,250 students supervised by a teaching faculty of more than 70 teachers. Its main mission is to discover, appreciate, and learn music, dance, and drama as part of courses of study in different departments. The conservatory was opened on 7 December 1996. Tributes were paid to Darius Milhaud, the "godfather" of the temple of music as well as Paul Arma, a famous composer who lived in Antony and who the auditorium is named after.

In 1967 Georges Suant, a theatre with 500 seats, and the Firmin-Gémier theatre, were installed in the hall built in 1930 on the Place du Marché after making some improvements including the provision of seats in the gods. The first director was Jacques Sarthou, then the director of the Théâtre de l'Île-de-France. Often referred to as the spiritual son of Firmin Gémier, given his similar experience in a traveling theatre, he hoped that this new theatre would take his name. Several very creative directors were then appointed to the theatre: Jean Rougerie appointed in 1972, Pierrette Garreau and Marc Ansel in 1979, Gérard Savoisien in 1984, René Chéneaux in 1991, François Kergourlay in 1995, and Marc Jeancourt in 2000. All these directors brought to Antony a cultural life that has quickly found a loyal following. In 2003 a "circus space", national stage, was created where the Big Tops of "new circuses" performed regularly. A Scène conventionnée, as part of the Agglomeration Community of Hauts-de-Bièvre, the Firmin Gémier theatre was associated in 2007 with the Théâtre La Piscine of Chatenay-Malabry. The Spartan character and the inconvenient nature of infrastructure contrasted with the wealth of programming. In September 2011, following the discovery of asbestos in the premises, the theatre closed quickly and permanently. The construction of a new hall is planned near the municipal library.

Located in the Bourdeau Park, the "Maison des Arts" has free entrance and is dedicated to exhibitions with artistic programming, introductory workshops, and awareness for children.

=== Suburban Quarters ===
Much of Antony consists of suburban districts. These homes were mostly built in the late 19th and early 20th centuries shortly after the arrival of the Arpajonnais railway that transformed a self-sufficient agricultural village into a small market garden town then a residential town. Among these new houses, the houses on the Avenue Gabriel Peri were especially typical of the Art Nouveau style dating from 1890 to 1895. The subdivision of "New Antony" was designed by the architect Anatole de Baudot (who had already designed the Lycée Lakanal in Sceaux). Despite the new demographic development in the 1950s, Antony has so far maintained a largely suburban character. In the late 2000s the urban planning policy vis-à-vis this heritage became a significant issue. In June 2009 the city began to demolish houses on the Boulevard Pierre-Brossolette then published in October 2009 a plan for alignment of the Avenue Gabriel-Peri that should eventually lead to the demolition of other houses. These urbanisation operations have been challenged by residents and local associations.

=== Cultural events and festivities ===
In addition to the performances at the Firmin-Gémier theatre in the Chénier Grand Hall of the Institution Sainte-Marie notably by the Orchestre national d'Île-de-France (National Orchestra of Île-de-France) there are also regular concerts in the Auditorium of the Conservatory and at temporary exhibitions where many events are organized.

The main cultural events and festivities in the city of Antony are:

- February: the Antiques fair held since 1987
- March: the International Meeting of the Guitar organized since 1993
- April: The Half-Marathon of Antony since 1989
- May:
  - events on the occasion of Europe Day on 9 May as the city is very involved with the European Movement (including Patrick Devedjian, who was vice president until 2002) in the organization of this day for all Europe.
  - Bulles dans la ville (Bubbles in the city): a festive day dedicated to Comics since 2004
  - the Village of nature and garden
- June:
  - the Solstice Festival: Since 2001 oriented towards circus arts and the street, the principle of this festival, organized with the town of Chatenay-Malabry, is to transform the two cities into a giant theatre.
  - Bubbles in the City: this day devoted to comics is the occasion of meetings with writers and designers, young talent show, and outdoor screenings.
- July and August:
  - the International Handicapped Tennis Tournament: the first handicapped tennis tournament organized in Europe every year since 1986, it brings together the best male and female players of the NEC Wheelchair Tennis Tour.
- September:
  - the Wine and Cheese Fair since 1987. This fair lasts three days and brings together 200 exhibitors from all parts of France in the Saint-Saturnin quarter with a wealth of local French cheeses and wines as well as meats, foie gras, and sweets. This major event of the season receives over 100,000 visitors.
  - Antony takes part in Heritage Day with a different theme each year
  - the Carousel of Art, an open-air gallery where Antonians exhibit their works of any nature whatsoever.
- October:
  - the Forum of Associations
  - the Science Festival since 1997
  - the Biennale since 1999 presenting the work of artists from Antony
- November: The Pace Jazz Festival since 2005

== Notable people ==
- Jean-Charles Persil (1785–1870), politician, Minister of Justice and Religious Affairs, lived and died here
- Alfred-Armand-Louis-Marie Velpeau (1795–1867), anatomist and surgeon
- Richard Guino (1890–1973), French-Catalan sculptor, lived here
- Flaminio Bertoni (1903–1964), Italian car designer and sculptor, lived here
- Paul Arma (1904–1987), French-Hungarian composer, lived here
- Louise Bourgeois (1911–2010), sculptor, lived here
- Georges Nomarski (1919–1997), French-Polish scientist, lived here
- Madeleine Lebeau (1923–2016) actress
- John Berger (1926–2017), English artist and writer, lived here
- René Desmaison (1930–2007), climber, lived here
- Patrick Devedjian (1944–2020), politician, mayor of Antony in 1983–2002, Minister under Jacques Chirac and Nicolas Sarkozy
- Philippe Duron (born 1947), politician
- Jérôme Cahuzac (born 1952), surgeon and politician, attended a school here
- Stéphane Sirkis (1959–1999), guitarist of the band Indochine
- Nicola Sirkis (born 1959), frontman and singer of Indochine
- Élie Semoun (born 1963), comedian and actor
- Agnès Jaoui (born 1964), screenwriter, film director and actress
- Laurent Lafforgue (born 1966), mathematician
- Vincent Lafforgue (born 1974), mathematician
- Didier Drogba (born 1978), footballer, lived in the Baconnets quarter
- Ibrahim Koma (born 1987), actor, grew up in the Baconnets quarter
- Lucas Hauchard (born 1996), content creator

== Iconography (photos) ==
See Media related to Antony (Hauts-de-Seine) at Wikimedia Commons.

The photographer Robert Doisneau immortalized Antony's streets in his report "The marriage of Paul and Odette" on 8 January 1944. Besides the photos in the Commons gallery (only in French), this website includes many pictures of Antony.

== Bibliography ==
- Collective work, Listening Point, Service municipal de la jeunesse de la ville d'Antony, 1978
- Thérèse Chenot, Anne Fontaine, Jeannine Héreil, Françoise Libbe, Alix Pouzet and Marie-Claude Watrin, Antony, from its origins to today, éditions Connaissance d'Antony, 1987 (ISBN 2-9502235-0-8)
- Anne Fontaine and Françoise Libbe, Saint-Saturnin of Antony, 1992 (ISBN 2-9502235-1-6)
- Lucien Baclé, Bicycle rides around the western and southern communes of Châtenay-Malabry, Antony, Verrières-le-Buisson, Massy: 17 circuits from 10 to 45 km, on pleasant secondary roads, éditions L. Baclé, 1996
- Yvonne Firino, Antony five centuries of street and place names, Association for the promotion of heritage of Antony, éditions APPA, 1998 (ISBN 2-9512924-0-6)
- Micheline Olivier, The Chapel Sainte-Marie Mère of the Church of Sainte-Marie of Antony, The sacred art at Sainte-Marie, 2002
- Jean-Pierre Tarin, The Notables of the First Empire: their residences in Île-de-France, éditions Terana, 2002

== See also ==
- Orlyval
- Communes of the Hauts-de-Seine department
