= Ticket t+ =

Discontinued public transport ticket type in Paris

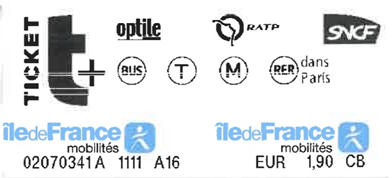
Ticket t+

The Ticket t+ was a single trip ticket for public transport in Paris, introduced in 2007 and discontinued in 2025. It was replaced by the Metro-Train-RER Ticket and the Bus-Tram Ticket, both of which require a Navigo card. The new Metro-Train-RER Ticket allows trips on the Metro, RER and Transilien networks in all zones, excluding access to airports. The new Bus-Tram Ticket allows trips on the bus and tramway networks in all zones, including access to airports.

== History ==
The Ticket t+ was available individually at a price of €2.50. It was also available as a pack of 10 at a price reduced by 20%. Between 2019 and 2024, the individual ticket and pack of 10 could also be loaded onto a reusable Navigo Easy card or smartphone. From September 2023, the pack of 10 was discontinued. From January 2025, the individual ticket was only available at some older ticket machines that could not yet issue Navigo Easy cards. From May 2025, the individual ticket was also discontinued.

== Validity ==
The Ticket t+ was valid for the following modes of public transport:

- The complete Metro network (excluding Orly Airport station)
- Zone 1 of the RER network (inside the limits of Paris)
- Zone 1 of the Transilien network (inside the limits of Paris)
- The complete tramway network (excluding lines T11, T12, and T13)
- The complete RATP bus network (excluding lines for which an additional Ticket t+ was needed)
- The complete Noctilien bus network
- The complete Optile bus network
- The Montmartre Funicular.

== Operation ==
The Ticket t+ was small and rectangular, composed mainly of stiff paper (similar to the Carte Orange), and listed the public transport modes for which it was valid. On the back side of the Ticket t+ was a black magnetic strip to store data. The user fed the Ticket t+ into a turnstile machine and the machine returned it.

The Ticket t+ was valid for single trips on the Metro network, allowing for transfers, up to 90 minutes. It was also valid for single trips on the RER and Transilien networks inside the city limits of Paris (zone 1). This led to a number of anomalies, such as travel being permitted to Stade de France via line 13 to Saint Denis Porte de Paris but not to La Plaine Stade de France via line B nor Stade de France Saint Denis via line D, and travel being permitted to La Défense via line 1 but not via line A.

The Ticket t+ was valid for single trips on the bus and tramway networks, allowing for transfers, up to 90 minutes. It was not valid for a return trip using the same line and could not be used to board the same line after interrupting a single trip. It was also not valid for transfers between the bus/tramway network and the Metro/RER/Transilien network.

The Ticket t+ was not valid for trips on tramway lines T11, T12, or T13, or Orly Airport station on Metro line 14. It was also not valid for trips on the RER or Transilien networks outside the city limits of Paris (zones 2-5), including trips to/from La Défense, Versailles, or Disneyland Paris. For these trips, an Origin-Destination Ticket was required.

== See also ==
- Navigo card
- Public transport fares in the Île-de-France
