= Longjumeau station =

Railway station in Longjumeau, France

Longjumeau Station
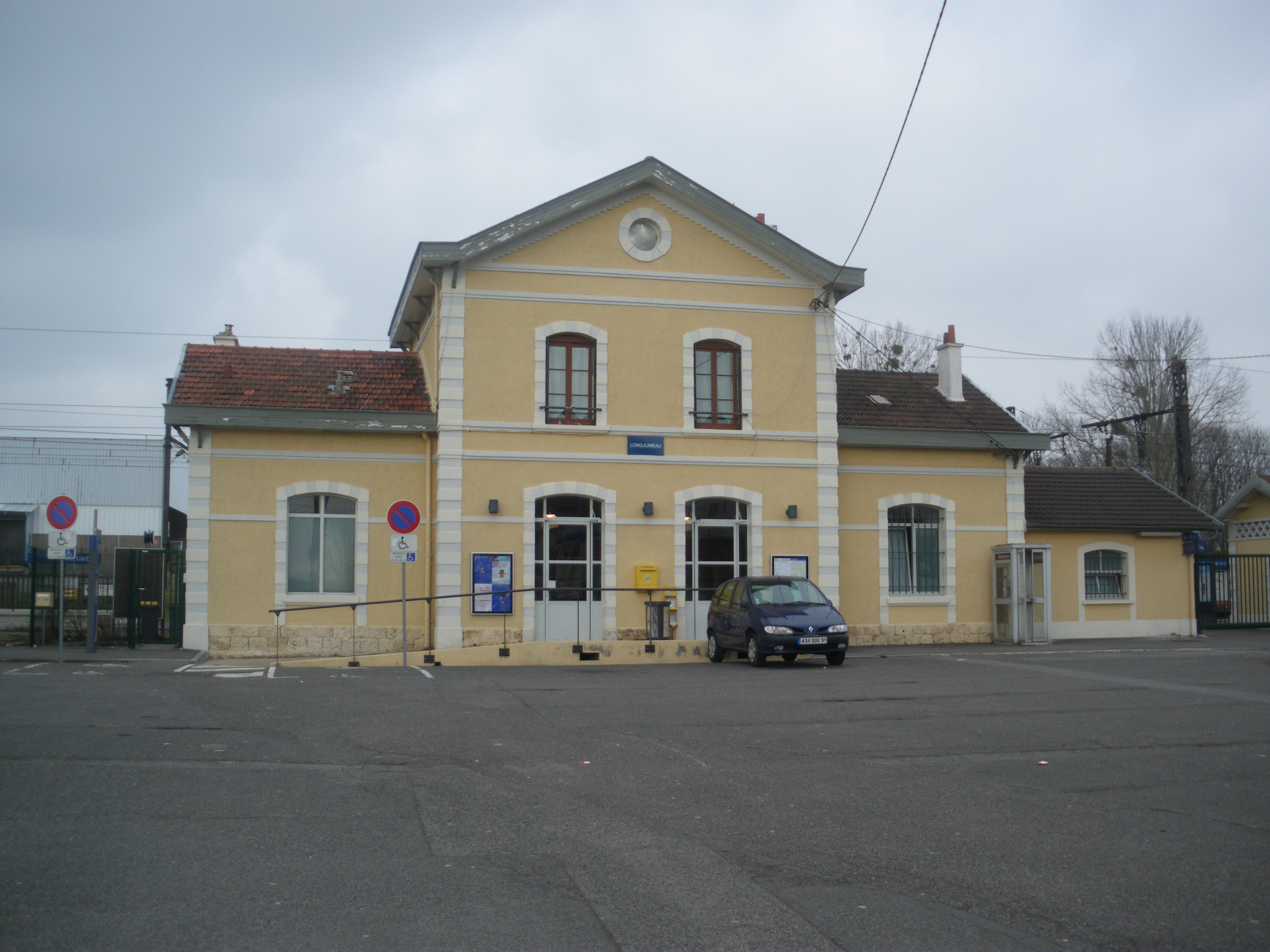
- Exterior view of Longjumeau Station

General information
- Location: Longjumeau, Essonne, Île-de-France; France
- Coordinates: 48°42′08″N 2°17′39″E
- Owner: SNCF
- Operator: SNCF
- Line: RER C
- Connections: Tramway T12

Services
Frequent RER C services
Location

Longjumeau Station is one of two station in Paris' express suburban rail system, the RER C, in the city of Longjumeau.

An interchange with tramway T12 is available.

There are frequent services at the station.

Preceding station	Tram	Following station
Champlan towards Massy–Palaiseau	T12	Chilly-Mazarin towards Évry-Courcouronnes

== See also ==
- List of stations of the Paris RER
