= Navigo card =

Public transportation fare card in Paris

- Location: Île-de-France
- Launched: 2001
- Manager: Île-de-France Mobilités
- Currency: Euro
- Validity: RATP; SNCF; Optile

The Navigo card (French: Carte Navigo) is a contactless smart card used to travel on public transport in Paris and Île-de-France. The card is scanned at turnstiles and readers to validate a ticket or pass. The card is based on the Calypso standard, initially implemented with Radio-frequency identification (RFID) technology, before transitioning to Near-field communication (NFC) technology. The card can be obtained via ticket windows, ticket machines, and apps such as Île-de-France Mobilités, Apple Wallet, and Google Wallet. Public transport fares in the Île-de-France can be loaded via the same methods.

== Card types ==
=== Navigo Travel Card ===
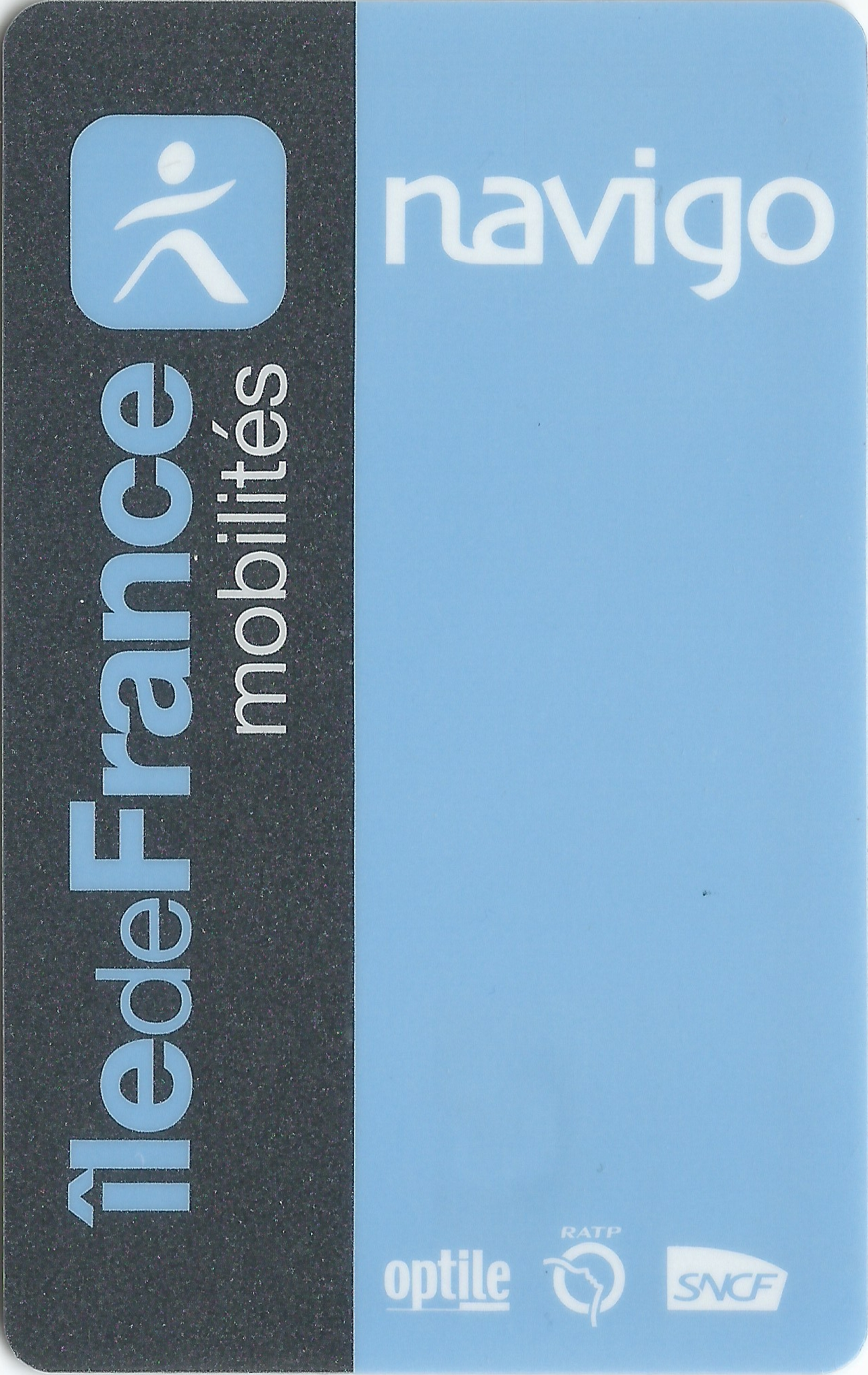
Navigo

The Navigo Travel Card is available to citizens who live or work in Paris or Île-de-France. The card itself is available for free via the Île-de-France Mobilités website, and staffed ticket windows. The name and the photograph of the user will be affixed to the card.

The card can be loaded with Day Passes, Week Passes, Month Passes, Year Passes, Antipollution Passes, Fête de la Musique Passes, and Liberté+. The card cannot be loaded with Métro-Train-RER Tickets, Bus-Tram Tickets, Airports Tickets, or Paris Visite Passes.

The card can also be used for identification on the Vélib' bicycle rental system.

=== Navigo Découverte Travel Card ===
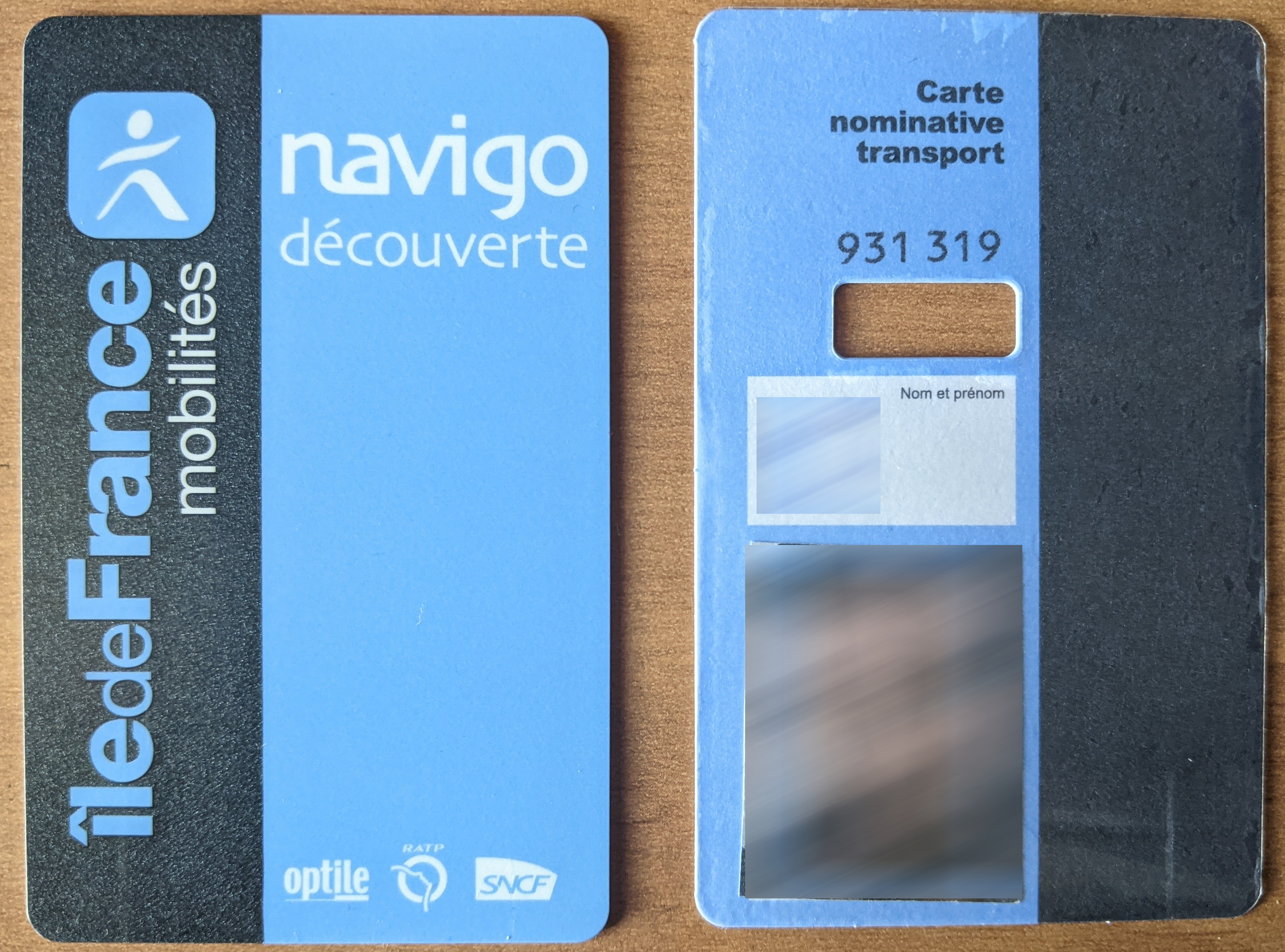
Navigo Découverte

The Navigo Découverte Travel Card is available to everyone, including tourists from outside Paris or Île-de-France. The card itself is available for a one-time fee of €5 via staffed ticket windows. The card includes a cardboard wrapper and a plastic holder. The name and the photograph of the user must be affixed to the cardboard wrapper before placing the card and the cardboard wrapper in the plastic holder.

The card can be loaded with Day Passes, Week Passes, Month Passes, Antipollution Passes, and Fête de la Musique Passes. The card cannot be loaded with Métro-Train-RER Tickets, Bus-Tram Tickets, Airports Tickets, Year Passes, Paris Visite Passes, or Liberté+.

The card can also be used for identification on the Vélib' bicycle rental system.

=== Navigo Easy Travel Card ===
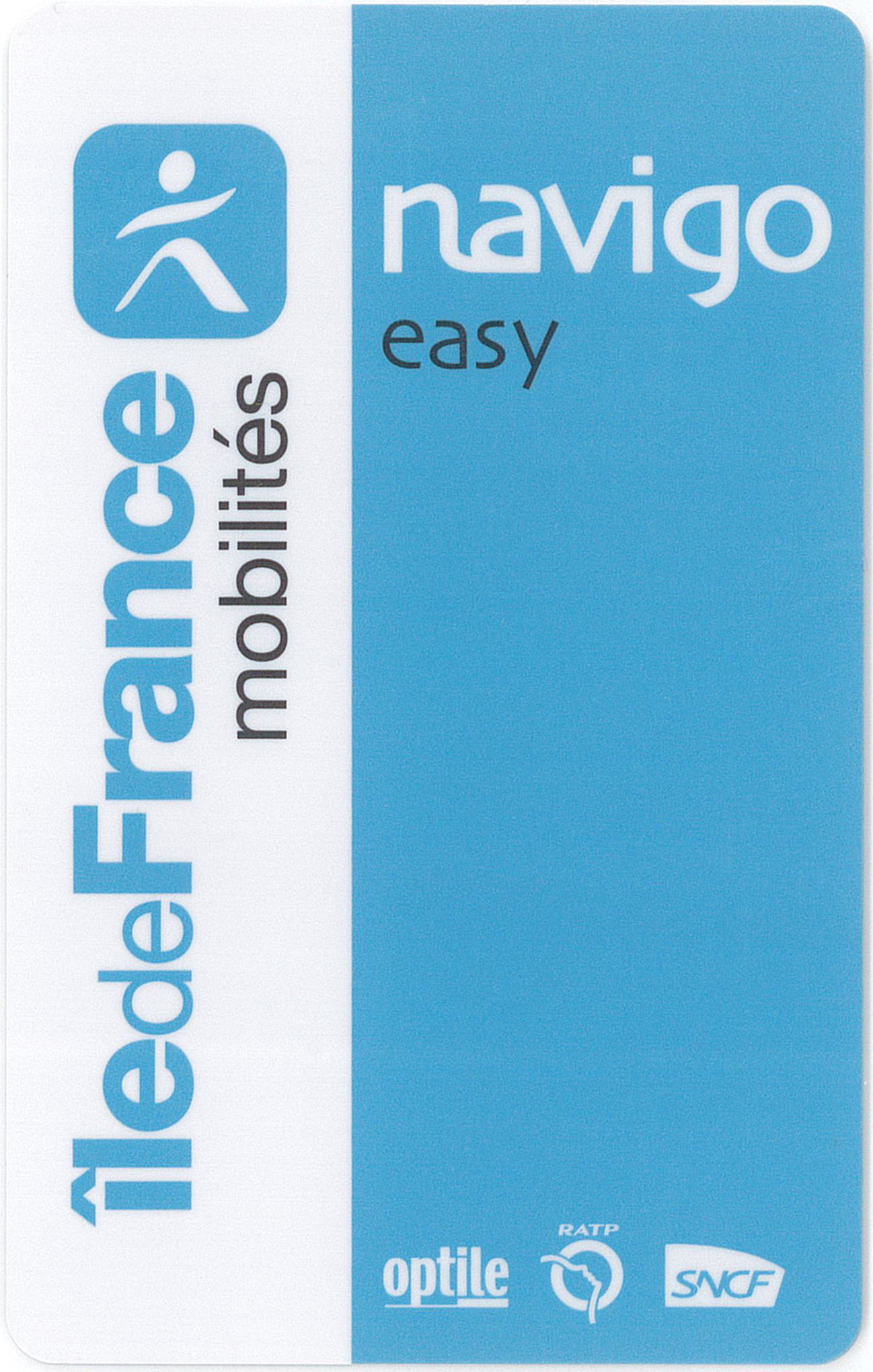
Navigo Easy

The Navigo Easy Travel Card is available to everyone, including tourists from outside Paris or Île-de-France. The card itself is available for a one-time fee of €2 via staffed ticket windows, and select ticket machines. The name and the photograph of the user is not required.

The card can be loaded with up to 20 Métro-Train-RER Tickets, Bus-Tram Tickets, and Airports Tickets, as well as Day Passes, Paris Visite Passes, Antipollution Passes, and Fête de la Musique Passes. The card cannot be loaded with Week Passes, Month Passes, Year Passes, or Liberté+. The card cannot be loaded with Métro-Train-RER Tickets and Airports Tickets simultaneously.

The card can also be used for identification on the Vélib' bicycle rental system.

=== Navigo on Smartphone ===
The Navigo on Smartphone is available to everyone, including tourists from outside Paris or Île-de-France. The card itself is available for free via the Île-de-France Mobilités, Bonjour RATP, SNCF Connect, Apple Wallet, Google Wallet, and Samsung Wallet apps.

The card can be loaded with up to 20 Métro-Train-RER Tickets, Bus-Tram Tickets, and Airports Tickets, as well as Day Passes, Week Passes, Month Passes, Year Passes, Paris Visite Passes, Antipollution Passes, Fête de la Musique Passes, and Liberté+. The card cannot be loaded with Métro-Train-RER Tickets and Airports Tickets simultaneously.

=== Card matrix ===
Card Matrix (1 January 2026)
Card in English	Card in French	Price	Places to obtain	Fares to load	Rules
Navigo Travel Card	Passe Navigo	Free	Ticket Windows	Day Pass, Week Pass, Month Pass, Year Pass, Antipollution Pass, Fête de la Musique Pass, Liberté+	Available to citizens who live or work in Paris or Île-de-France
Navigo Découverte Travel Card	Passe Navigo Découverte	€5	Ticket Windows	Day Pass, Week Pass, Month Pass, Antipollution Pass, Fête de la Musique Pass	Available to citizens and tourists
Navigo Easy Travel Card	Passe Navigo Easy	€2	Ticket Windows, Ticket Machines	Métro-Train-RER Ticket, Bus-Tram Ticket, Airports Ticket, Day Pass, Paris Visite Pass, Antipollution Pass, Fête de la Musique Pass	Available to citizens and tourists
Navigo on Smartphone	Navigo sur Smartphone	Free	Île-de-France Mobilités app, Bonjour RATP app, SNCF Connect app, Apple Wallet app, Google Wallet app, Samsung Wallet app	Métro-Train-RER Ticket, Bus-Tram Ticket, Airports Ticket, Day Pass, Week Pass, Month Pass, Year Pass, Paris Visite Pass, Antipollution Pass, Fête de la Musique Pass, Liberté+	Available to citizens and tourists

== History ==
When the Navigo card was first introduced in 2001, it was only made available to subscribers of the Carte Intégrale annual pass.

From 2003, the card was made available to subscribers of the Carte Imagine'R annual pass.

From 2004, the card was made available to subscribers of the Carte Orange weekly and monthly passes within zones 1 and 2.

From 2005, the card was made available to subscribers of the Carte Orange weekly and monthly passes in all tramways and buses.

From 2006, the card could be used in all means of public transport in the entirety of Île-de-France in place of the conventional Carte Orange, which was discontinued in 2009.

From 2007, the card became compatible with Vélib', the bicycle-sharing system; the card also became compatible with Autolib', the car-sharing system, until they ceased operations in 2018.

On 1 September 2007, the Carte Navigo Découverte was introduced.

On 9 December 2013, both card types were redesigned by Philippe Starck to use NFC instead of RFID.

On 12 June 2019, the Carte Navigo Easy was introduced.

On 13 November 2019, the Navigo Liberté+ subscription service was introduced.

Since July 2018, a physical card can be loaded via smartphone.

Since September 2019, a digital card can be obtained, loaded and validated via apps such as Île-de-France Mobilités and Apple Wallet.

Since November 2025, select bus journeys can be validated using a CB, Mastercard or Visa card, including those in a digital wallet like Apple Pay or Google Pay.

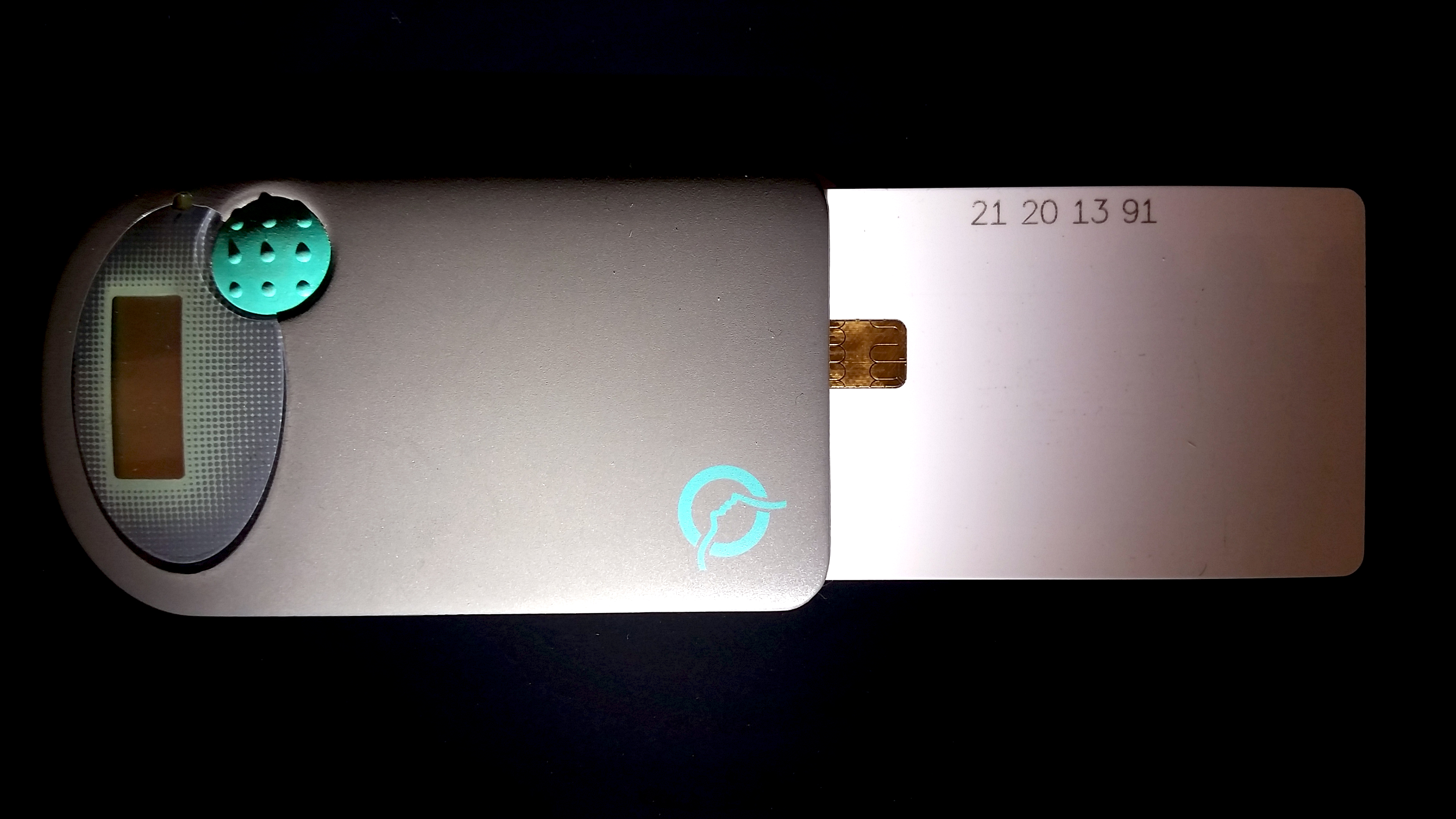
Navigo prototype

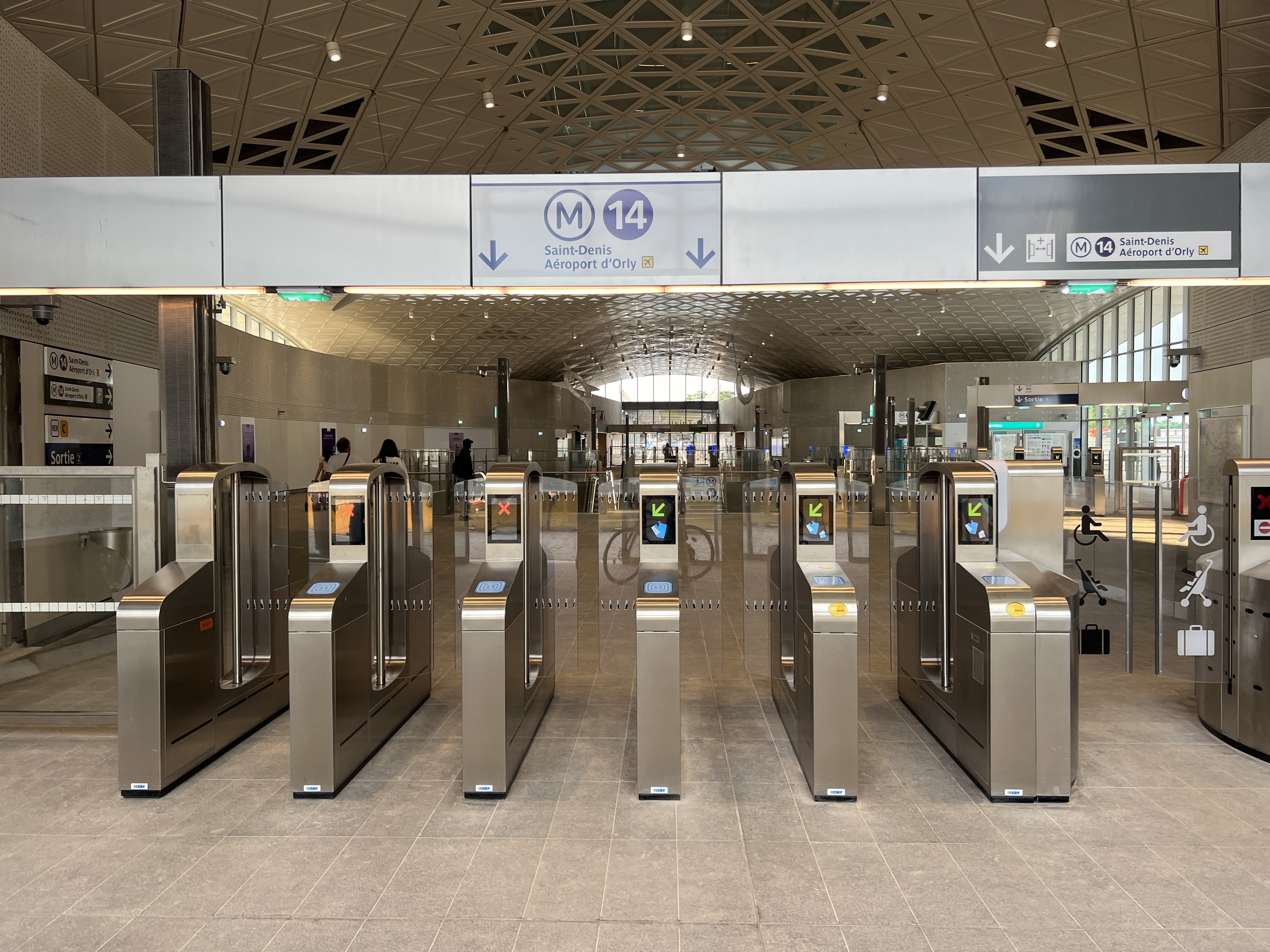
Navigo turnstiles at metro station

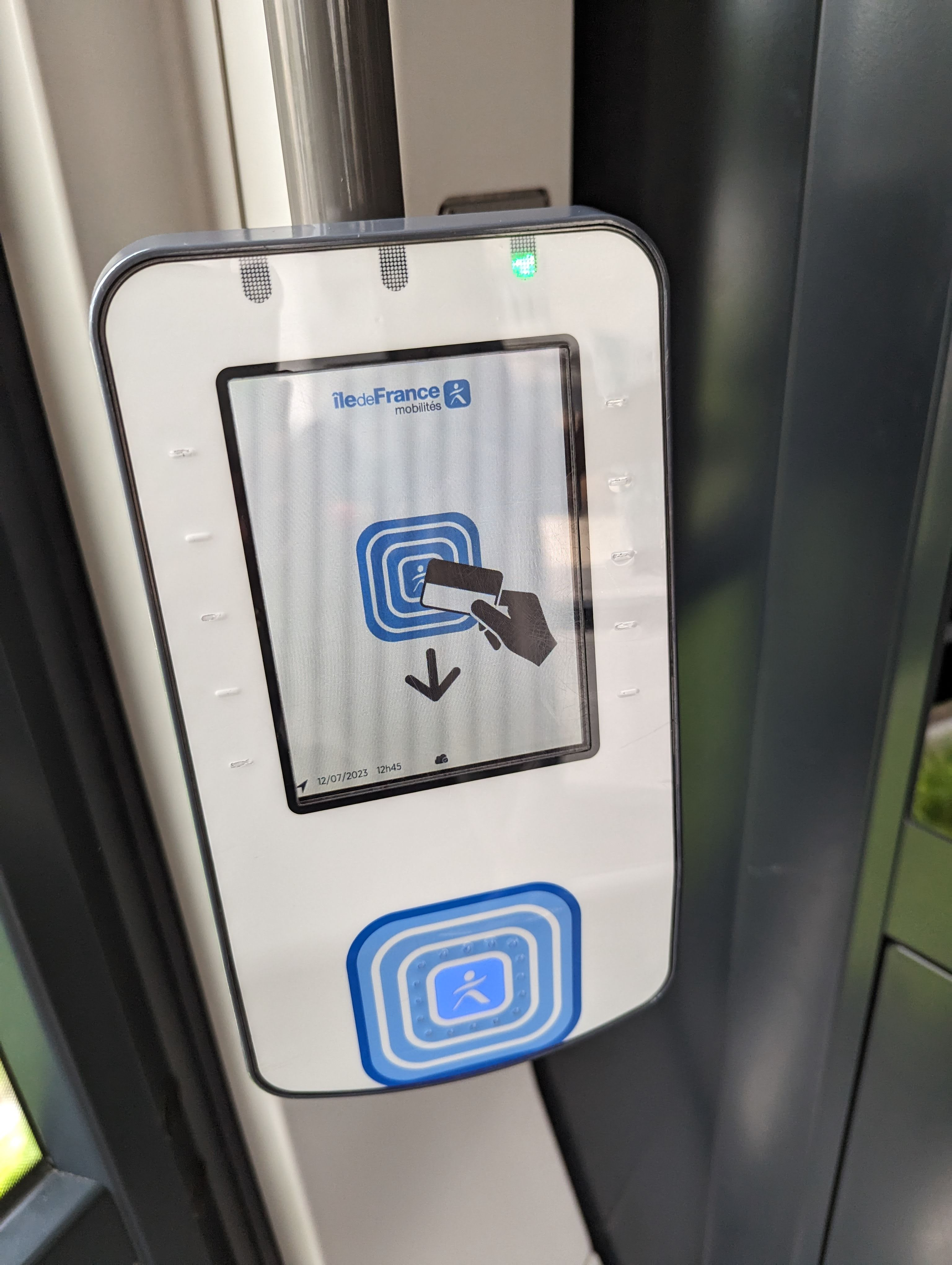
Navigo reader on board tram

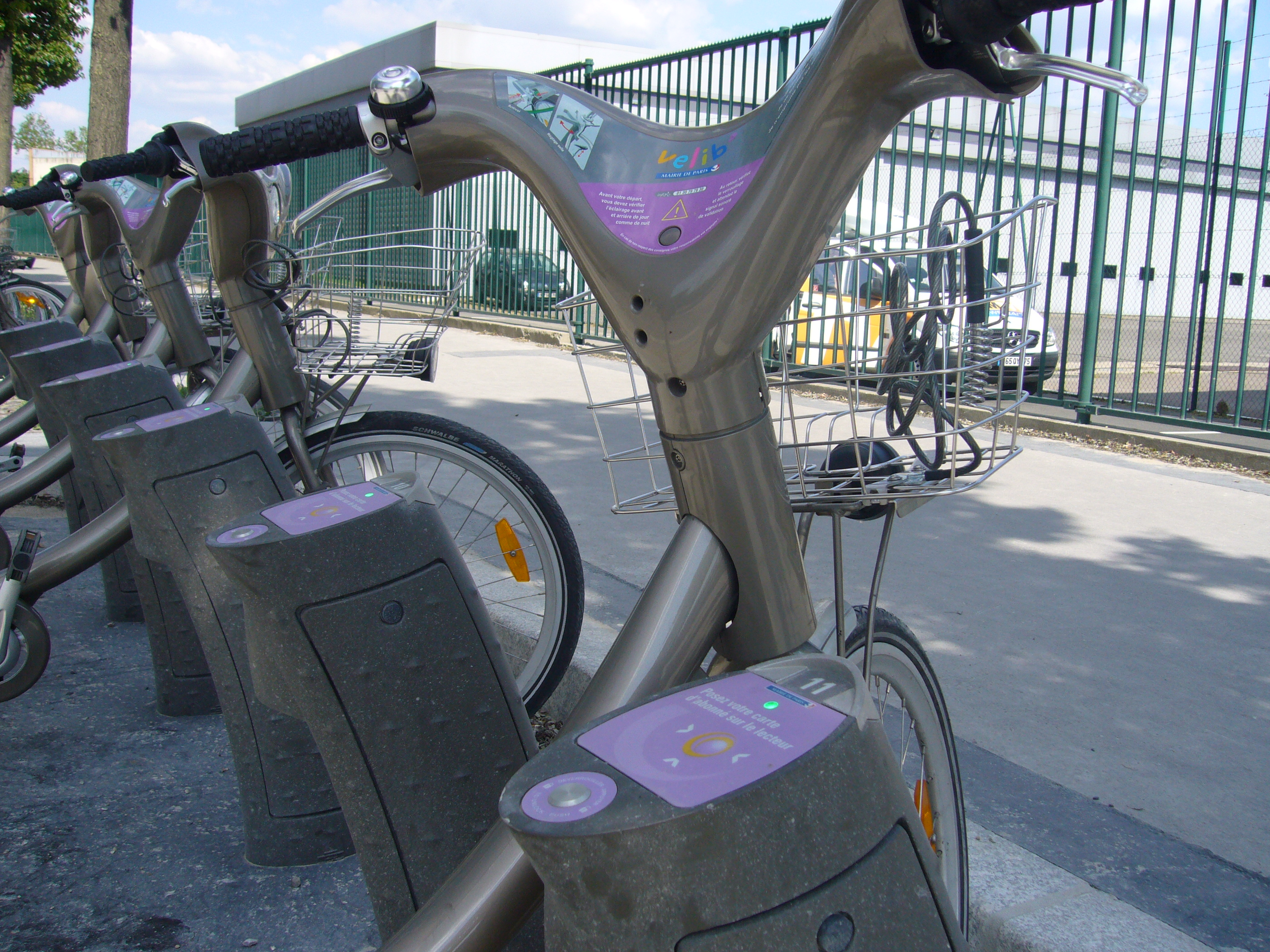
Navigo reader at Vélib' station

== See also ==
- Public transport fares in the Île-de-France
- Transport in Paris
