= Owona =

Owona is a surname occurring mainly in Cameroon. Notable people with the surname include:

- Brice Owona (born 1989), Cameroonian footballer
- Dieudonné Owona (born 1986), Cameroonian footballer
- Grégoire Owona (born 1950), Cameroonian politician
- Jean-Emmanuel Effa Owona (born 1983), Cameroonian footballer
- Jérémy Bana Owona, known as Werenoi (1994–2025), French rapper of Cameroonian descent
- Joseph Owona (born 1976), Cameroonian basketball player
- Lucien Owona (born 1990), Cameroonian footballer
- Nicolas Owona (born 1952), Cameroonian cyclist
- Norbert Owona (1951–2021), Cameroonian footballer
- Stéphane Owona (born 1985), French-Ivorian footballer
- Evelyne Owona Essomba (born 1977), Cameroonian journalist
