= Essomba =

Essomba is a surname. Notable people with the surname include:

- Antoin Essomba (born 2003), Cameroonian footballer
- Evelyne Owona Essomba (born 1977), Cameroonian journalist
- Franck Essomba (born 1987), Cameroonian footballer
- Jean-Bernard Ndongo Essomba (died 2023), Cameroonian politician
- Thomas Essomba (born 1987), Cameroonian-British boxer
- Titi Essomba (born 1981), Cameroonian footballer
- Elie Victor Essomba Tsoungui, Cameroonian politician
