= Transilien Line V =

Suburban rail service around Paris

Line V

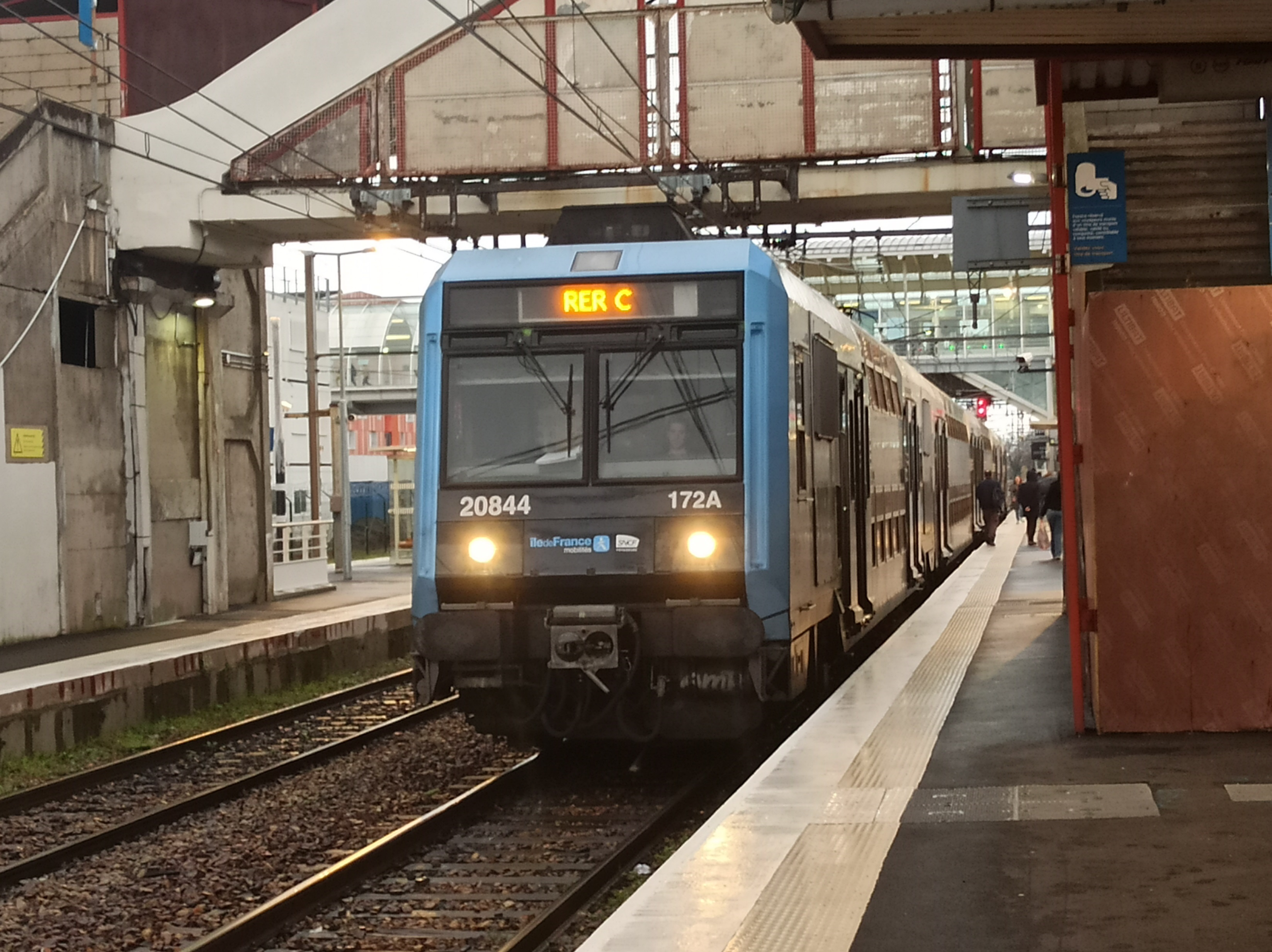
- Z 20844 train at Massy–Palaiseau

Overview
- Termini: Versailles Chantiers; Massy–Palaiseau
- Connecting lines: RER RER B RER C Transilien Transilien Line N (Paris-Montparnasse) Transilien Line U Tramways in Île-de-France Île-de-France tramway Line 12
- Stations: 7

Service
- Type: Commuter rail
- System: Transilien
- Operator: SNCF
- Depot: Trappes
- Rolling stock: Z 5600, Z 8800, Z 20500, Z 20900

History
- Opened: 15 December 2024

Technical
- Line length: 15 km (9.3 mi)
- Track gauge: 1,435 mm (4 ft 8 1/2 in) standard gauge
- Electrification: Overhead line, 1,500 V DC
- Operating speed: 100 km/h (62 mph)
Route map
- (*) Under construction

Transilien Line V is a railway line serving the southwestern part of the Île-de-France region. It connects Versailles Chantiers and Massy–Palaiseau. It belongs to the Transilien network operated by SNCF, the French national railway. Unlike the other Transilien lines (with the exception of Line U), Line V lies completely outside the city limits of Paris.

Before December 2023, the line was operated as a branch of RER C. On 4 December 2023, the line was separated from the RER C and became a shuttle line, in preparation for the opening of the T12 Express tramway line on 10 December 2023. The line was officially designated line V on 15 December 2024.

== History ==
The tracks that Transilien Line V operates over were built as part of the Grande Ceinture line. Construction of the line began after August 1875 when it was declared of public utility. The section that the Line V operates over opened as part of the section of railway line between Juvisy and Versailles Chantiers on 1 May 1883.

A large part of the Grande Ceinture line was closed to passenger traffic in 1939 with the exception of the southernmost section of the future line V, between Versailles Chantiers and Juvisy via Massy–Palaiseau. However, the majority of trains over the line were freight trains.

This section of the line was electrified on 6 February 1947. Additional passenger traffic would come to the line over the following decades until the line was integrated into the RER C line of the Réseau Express Régional in 1992.

In 2004 and again in 2008, studies were conducted into adding more frequent service on the line, first proposing it become a dedicated RER line, then later recommending it become a tram-train line. However, the section between Versailles Chantiers and Massy–Palaiseau was not chosen for conversion, instead focusing on the section between Massy–Palaiseau and Épinay-sur-Orge, which would eventually become the T12 Express tramway.

On June 7, 2023, the president of Île-de-France Mobilités, Valérie Pécresse announced that the section of between Versailles Chantiers and Massy–Palaiseau would be disconnected from the RER C network to be operated as separate shuttle line. The disconnection took place on 10 December 2023, the same day the T12 Express tramway line started operating between Massy–Palaiseau and Épinay-sur-Orge.

The Line V name is being progressively rolled out on signs and websites, with the full change occurring on 8 December 2024.

== See also ==
- List of Transilien stations
