= Île-de-France tramway Line 12 Express =

Tram line in Essonne, south of Paris

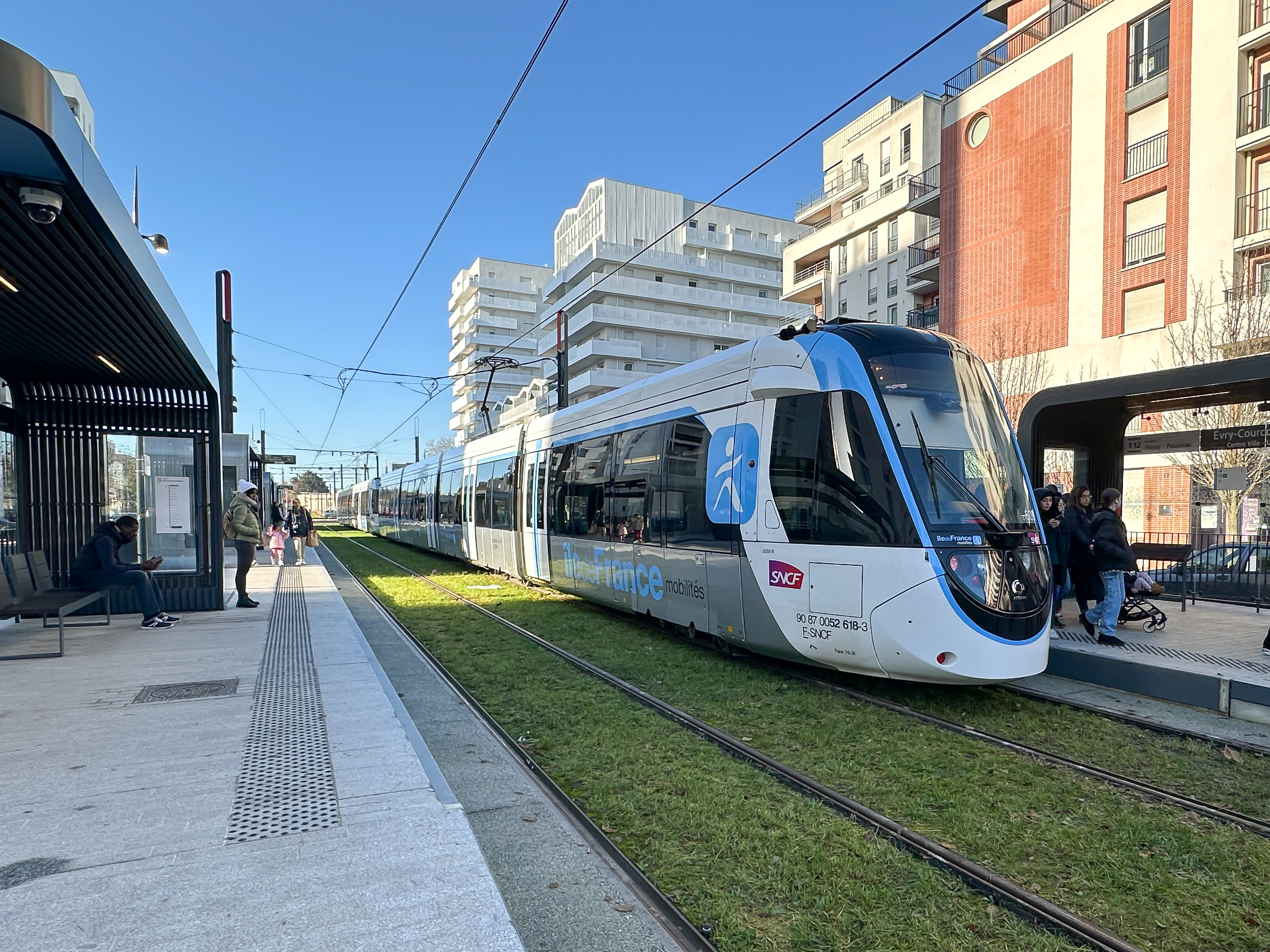
- Île-de-France tramway Line 12 Express at the Évry-Courcouronnes Centre terminal

Overview
- Owner: Île-de-France Mobilités
- Termini: Massy-Palaiseau; Évry-Courcouronnes
- Stations: 16

Service
- Type: Tram-train
- System: Tramways in Île-de-France
- Operator: RATP
- Rolling stock: 21 Alstom Citadis Dualis

History
- Opened: 10 December 2023

Technical
- Line length: 20 km (12 mi)
- Track gauge: 1,435 mm (4 ft 8 1/2 in) standard gauge
Route map
Key

Île-de-France tramway Line T12 Express (known as the Tram-Train Évry-Massy and Tram Express Sud during the planning phase) is a suburban tram-train line in Paris, France. Designed by Île-de-France Mobilités and operated by RATP, the line is 20 kilometres (12 miles) long and is projected to carry approximately 40,000 passengers per day. On 22 January 2014, the STIF published a plan presenting the commissioning of the line in 2020. Initially planned to open in 2020, the opening date of the line was postponed to 2022, and in May 2021, the opening date of T12 was delayed again to December 2023. The line opened on 10 December 2023.

== History ==
=== Original RER Project ===
The line of tram-train Évry – Massy finds its origin in the project of Tangential the South or Tangential Southwest, which suggested connecting by a new RER line the city of Versailles, even that of Achères in Yvelines, to that from Melun in Seine-et-Marne, including Massy and Évry.

The project contained several operations:

- The modification of the plan of railways, as well as the creation of a garage, a site of maintenance and a center of management of the operations in Massy-Palaiseau;
- The construction of a completely new line of seven kilometers between Épinay-sur-Orge and Grigny, essentially underground;
- The creation of two new train stations in Épinay-sur-Orge and to Grigny;
- The putting in accessibility of all the stations to the people with reduced mobility;
- The replacement of all of crosswalks by works of engineering;
- The removal of several level crossings on the existing lines.

The studies were presented in committee of follow-up of the STIF on 23 September 2004.

Registered with a 300 million euro budget on the planning contract State-Region in 2000–2006, the project of a global cost about a billion euros was finally abandoned in 2006 considering its cost as prohibitive by comparison with its expected effects. The attributed credits were accordingly lost.

=== Current Project ===
==== The tram-train solution ====
The STIF then proposed a less expensive solution but questioning all the led studies. On its essonnian part, the project was transformed into a more modest line, but also more viable, connecting Évry with Massy by tram-train, the comfort, the speed and the number of transported passengers being necessarily lower than the initial project.

In February 2008 the projected timescale was established as follows:

- File of objectives and main characteristics (dossier d'objectifs et de caractéristiques principales (DOCP)) : in February 2008;
- Consultation: in 25 May on 3 July 2009;
- Early works: 2015;
- Beginning of the building work of the line: in March 2017
- Projected putting into service: 2018.

Within the framework of the "Plan Banlieue" approved by the interministerial committee of the cities on 20 June 2008, the State claimed to be ready to finance at the level of 220 million euros "to support at least 4 specific projects of which the Tramway Line 4 towards Clichy-Montfermeil, the Tangentielle Nord, the Massy-Evry tram-train and the connection RER D/RER B (Barreau de Gonesse)".

The public consultation, which was kept during the second semester 2009, had no unanimous result. The proposed plan met oppositions: the association Tangentielle 8, for example, clearly showed its opposition to the project because of the abandonment of the Juvisy-Massy-Versailles direct link. The association rather proposed an RER line Juvisy-Massy-Versailles disconnected from the RER line C, and, in addition, to create a tramway line between Savigny and Évry.

The fate of the section between Versailles-Chantiers and Massy-Palaiseau, who is at present a member of the branch C8, was unknown back then. In 2020, this section must be kept in principle in the plan of the RER C, after its connecting in the branch C2 of the RER C ending in the same place (this railway is moreover used by some Norman TGV intersectors every week). It was later decided to extent the line from Massy-Palaiseau to Versailles-Chantiers, in order to replace completely the branch C2. The projected putting into service is towards the end of 2020.

==== Declaration of public utility ====
The public inquiry of the first phase, that is approximately 20 km (12 mi) connecting the multimodal pole of Évry-Courcouronnes Centre with the station of Massy-Palaiseau, was held from 7 January to 11 February 2013, within the various municipalities concerned by the project. The déclaration d'utilité publique (declaration of public utility) was granted on 22 August 2013.

==== Work ====
The financial plan of the line, to the amount of 455 million euros, is approved on 7 October 2015, by the STIF. The coverage is split between the State (28%), the region Île-de-France (53%), the Essonne departmental council (15%) and SNCF Réseau (4%). Work began at the beginning of 2017, then the validation of the protocol of financing on 9 March 2017 by the regional elected representatives guaranteed the pursuit of the project for the deadlines, with an opening planned in 2020.

=== Versailles-Chantiers Extension ===
At the end of 2008, the SNCF proposed that the section between Versailles-Chantiers and Pont de Rungis (when it will be merged, thanks to the putting into service of the streetcar-train Évry-Massy in 2017) will be integrated into a project of tram-train connecting the stations of Versailles-Chantiers and Sucy-Bonneuil and it will replace the RER C (since December 2023 replaced by Transilien Line V on this segment).

However, during the public dialogue on the streetcar-train Évry-Massy, numerous notices expressed themselves in favour of another solution: the extension of the Évry-Massy tram-train to Versailles-Chantiers. Both projects are not compatible.

On 26 January 2011 the State and the Region agreed on the broad guidelines for public transport in Île-de-France by quoting the possible extension of the Évry-Massy tram-train to Versailles-Chantiers with the indication of a putting into service planned for 2020.

At the beginning of 2011, SNCF seemed to notice this choice concerning the section between Versailles-Chantiers and Massy-Palaiseau by suggesting integrating the section between Massy-Palaiseau and Pont de Rungis into a Massy-Palaiseau-Sucy-Bonneuil line via Pont de Rungis.

On 16 May 2013 the STIF officially validated the continuation of the tram-train up to the station of Versailles-Chantiers. The tram-train would completely replace the C8 branch of the RER C. The project was presented in preliminary dialogue from 1 June to 7 July 2013.

- 2013: consultation
- 2013–2015: Follow-up studies;
- 2015: Public inquiry;
- 2015–2017: In-depth studies;
- 2017: Beginning of the works;
- without date : putting into service.

== Planned rolling stock ==
The line is operated with 25 Class U52600 Citadis Dualis electric tram-trains.

The Citadis Dualis, a tram-train version of Citadis, is 2.65 m wide and 42 m long, with an 11.5-ton axle load and maximum speed of 100 km/h (62 mph). It is capable of strong accelerations and can climb grades of up to 6.5%. Totally accessible to people with reduced mobility or in wheelchairs, it has a flat floor 38 cm in height and can transport 250 people. It can be operated in double or triple units as needed to meet passenger demand. The tram-trains have air conditioning, a space reserved for people with reduced mobility, a video surveillance system, and electronic passenger information displays.

== Route ==
The line Évry-Massy, planned to be 20 kilometres (12 miles) long, will serve all in all 16 stations and stations among which 11 new stations, allowing in main-line railway lines the service of the municipalities of Longjumeau, Chilly-Mazarin and finally Épinay-sur-Orge. Then, in an urban tramway network, it will serve the municipalities of Épinay-sur-Orge, Morsang-sur-Orge, Viry-Châtillon, Grigny, Ris-Orangis, Courcouronnes and finally Évry. It will have interchanges with existing Réseau Express Régional (RER) lines B, C and D.
