= Hôtel de Ville, Longjumeau =

Town hall in Longjumeau, France

Hôtel de Ville
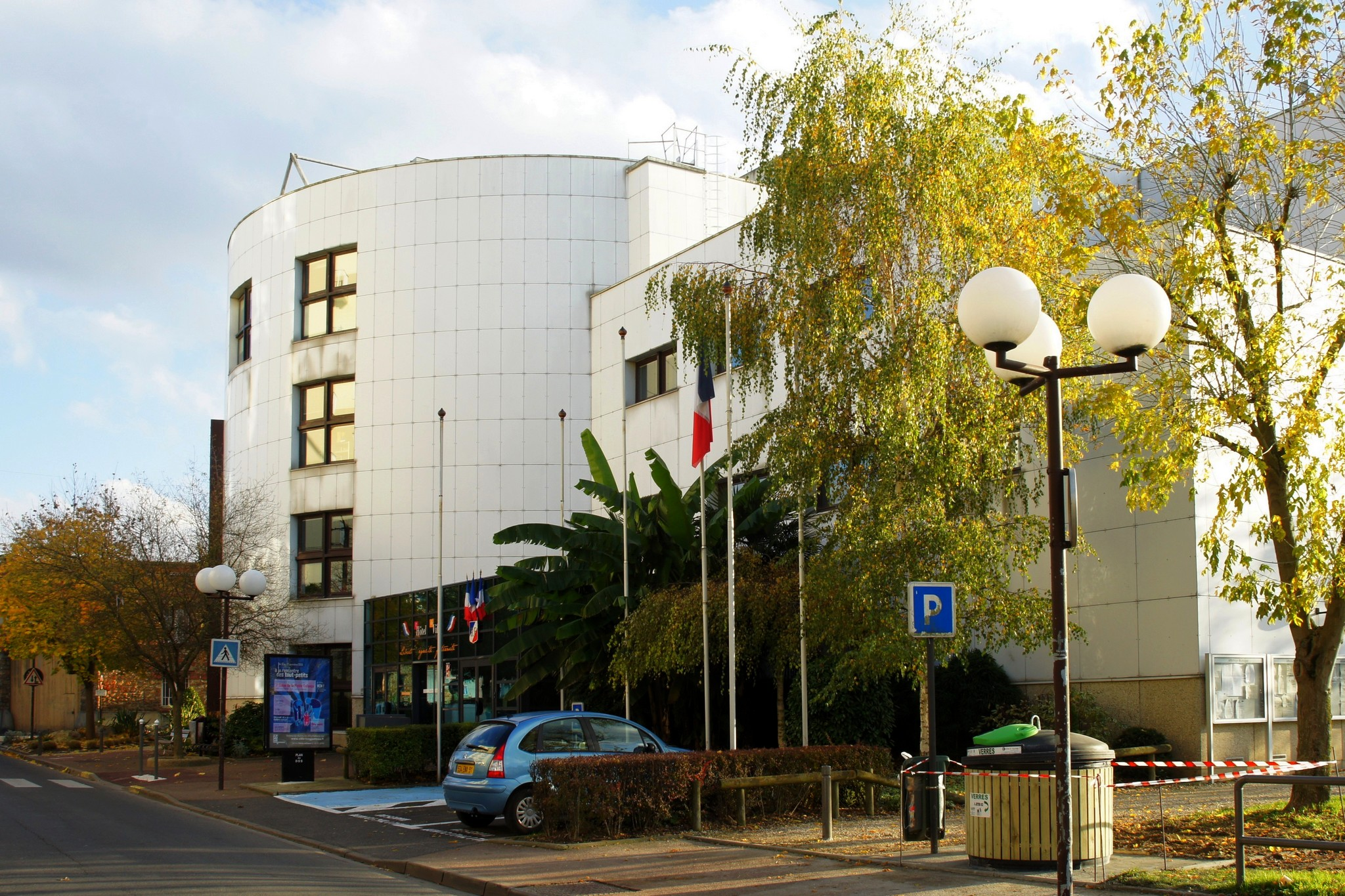
- The main frontage of the Hôtel de Ville in November 2009
- Interactive map of the Hôtel de Ville area

General information
- Type: City hall
- Architectural style: Modern style
- Location: Longjumeau, France
- Coordinates: 48.6942°N 2.2958°E
- Completed: 1997

The Hôtel de Ville (French pronunciation: [otɛl də vil], City Hall) is a municipal building in Longjumeau, Essonne, in the southwestern suburbs of Paris, standing on Rue Léontine Sohier.

== History ==
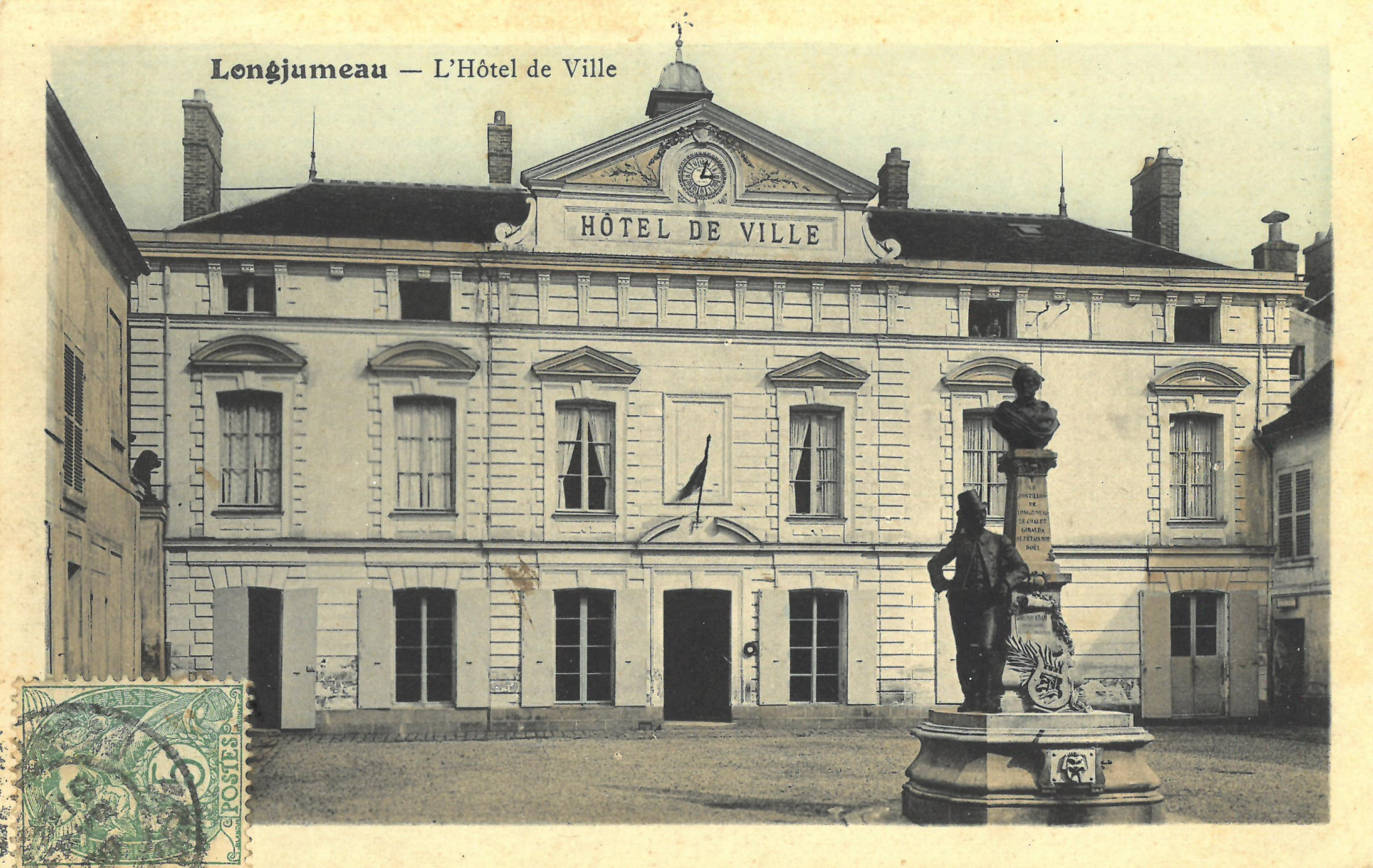
The old town hall

Following the French Revolution, the new town council initially met at the home of the mayor at the time. This arrangement continued until 1877 when the council decided to acquire a building on what is now Rue du Président François Mitterrand. It had been designed as a private residence in the neoclassical style, built in ashlar stone and had been completed in the 18th century.

The building was laid out with a main block and two wings which were projected forward to form a courtyard. The design of the main block involved a main frontage of seven bays facing onto the courtyard. The central section of three bays featured a doorway with a segmental pediment flanked by a pair of casement windows on the ground floor, a panel flanked by a pair of casement windows with triangular pediments on the first floor, and a parapet surmounted by an entablature and a pediment with a clock in the tympanum at roof level. The other bays were fenestrated in a similar style except that the first floor windows featured segmental pediments.

A monument to commemorate the Le postillon de Lonjumeau (The Postilion of Lonjumeau), an opéra comique in three acts by the composer, Adolphe Adam, was created by the sculptor, Paul Fournier, and installed in the courtyard on 23 May 1897. The monument took the form of a bust of the composer on a pedestal, with a bronze figure depicting the postilion standing alongside. After the war, the old town hall served as a courthouse before being demolished to facilitate the development of the École Élémentaire Georges Guynemer in the 1970s.

The council was subsequently accommodated in several buildings. These included a mid-19th century property on Avenue du Maréchal Leclerc which also accommodated the local district court, and, from 1972, the 18th century Château Nativelle which later became the local public library.

In the early 1990s, the council, led by the mayor, Philippe Schmit, decided to commission a modern town hall. The site they selected was on the south side Rue Léontine Sohier. It was designed in the modern style, built in concrete and glass with white tiles and was completed in 1997. The design of the four storey building involved a large cylindrical structure at the northeast corner and a single storey entrance block facing onto the street. Internally, the principal room was the Salle Manouchian.
