= Évry-Courcouronnes station =

RER station and tram stop in Évry-Courcouronnes, France

Évry-Courcouronnes Centre
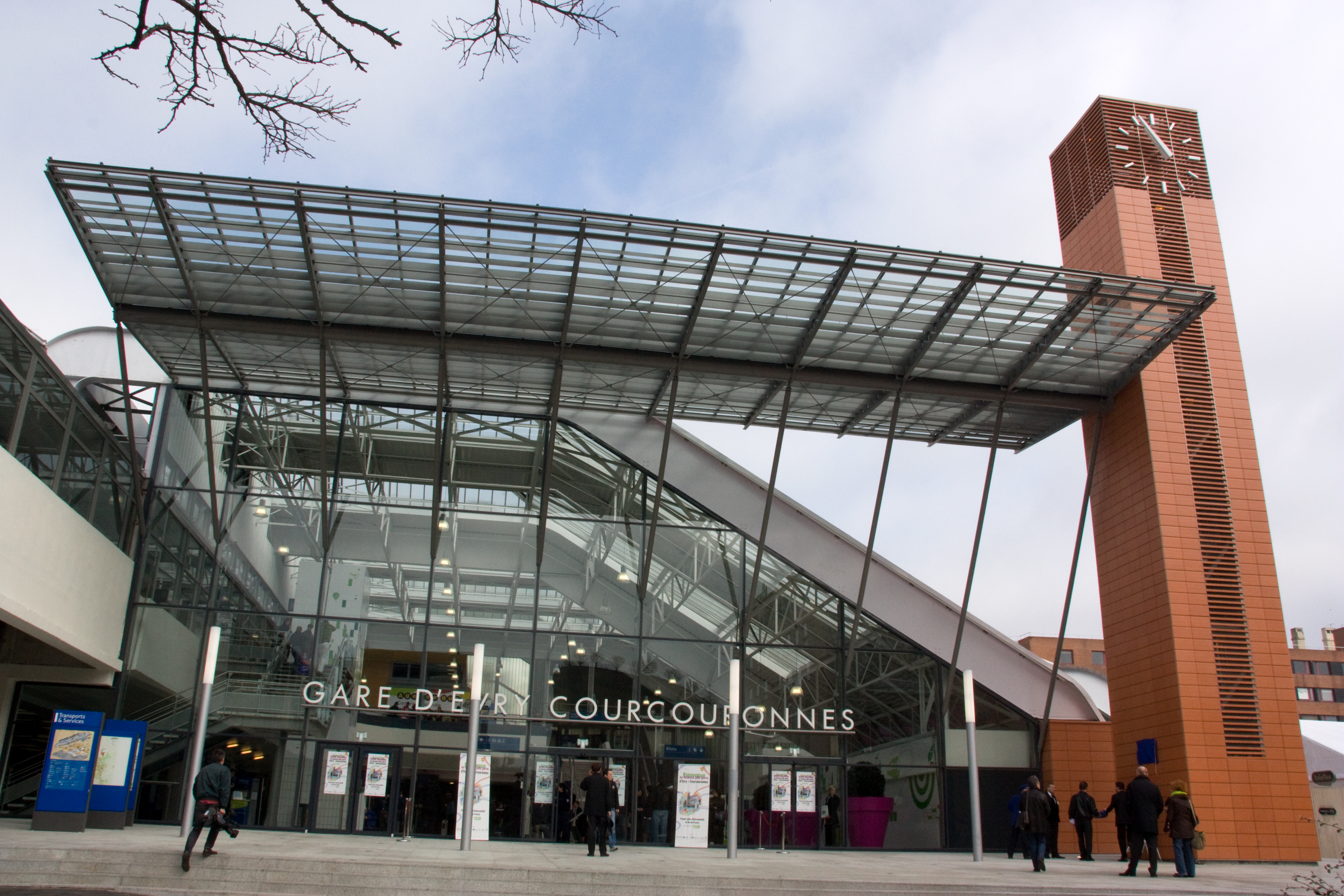
- Main building of Évry-Courcouronnes station

General information
- Location: Place de la Gare; Évry-Courcouronnes; France
- Coordinates: 48°37′34″N 2°25′44″E
- Elevation: 82 m (269 ft)
- Operator: SNCF
- Line: Grigny–Corbeil-Essonnes railway
- Platforms: 2 side platforms
- Tracks: 2
- Train operators: SNCF
- Connections: Noctilien: N135 N144

Construction
- Accessible: Yes, by prior reservation

Other information
- Station code: 87681387
- Fare zone: 5

History
- Opened: 1975

Passengers
- 2024: 12,893,424

Services
Preceding station	RER	Following station
Orangis – Bois de l'Épine towards Creil	RER D	Le Bras-de-Fer–Évry–Genopole towards Corbeil-Essonnes
Preceding station	Tram	Following station
Bois Briard towards Massy–Palaiseau	T12	Terminus
Location

Évry-Courcouronnes station is an RER station and tramway stop in Évry-Courcouronnes, France. The station was opened in 1975 and is on the Grigny–Corbeil-Essonnes railway. RER D, which is operated by the SNCF, and Île-de-France tramway Line 12 Express, operated by Transkeo, serves the station.

== Station info ==
Constructed at an altitude of 82 meters above sea level, Évry-Courcouronnes station is at the 7.008 kilometer point of the Grigny–Corbeil-Essonnes railway, in between the stations of Orangis – Bois de l'Épine and Le Bras-de-Fer–Évry-Génopole. In 2014, 8,741,664 people used the station.

An interchange with Île-de-France tramway Line 12 Express is available.

== Train services ==
The following RER D train service serve the station: Local services (RER D) Orry-la-Ville–Coye – Villiers-le-Bel – Gare de Lyon – Villeneuve-Saint-Georges – Évry–Courcouronnes Centre – Corbeil-Essonnes
