= Massy–Palaiseau station =

Railway station in Massy, France

Massy–Palaiseau
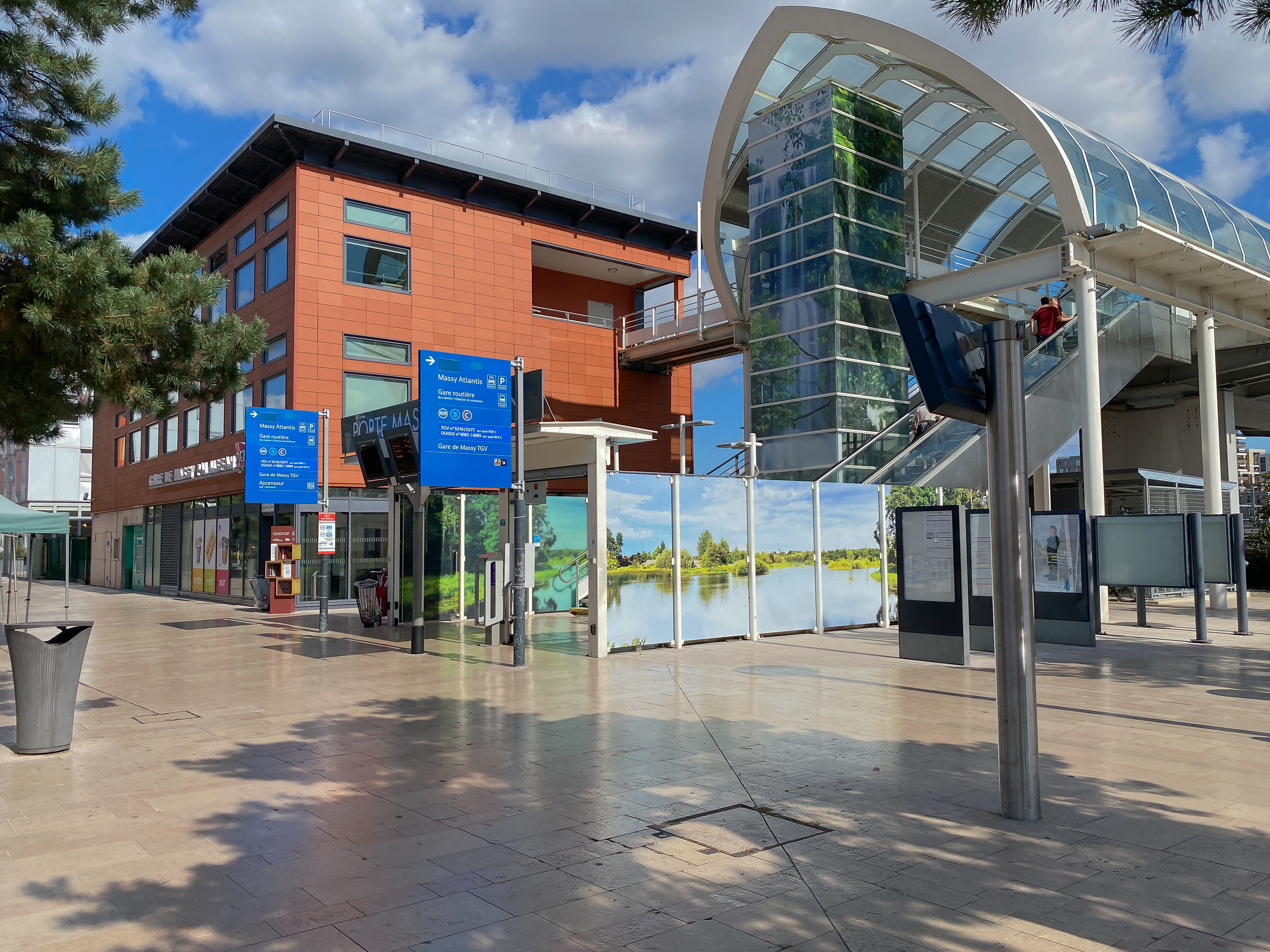
- SNCF passenger building on the left and footbridge to platforms on the right.

General information
- Location: Avenue Raymond Aron; Massy; France
- Coordinates: 48°43′29″N 02°15′30″E
- Operator: SNCF; RATP Group (RER B platform)
- Lines: Ligne de Sceaux; Grande Ceinture line
- Platforms: 4 island platforms
- Tracks: 8 + 1 bypass

Construction
- Structure type: At-grade
- Parking: 424 spaces
- Cycle facilities: Véligo parking station
- Accessible: RER B: Yes, by request to staff; RER C: No; Transilien V: No; Tram & TGV: Yes

Other information
- Station code: 87393579
- Fare zone: 4

History
- Opened: 1 May 1883

Passengers
- 2024: 3,215,149

Services
Preceding station	SNCF	Following station
Versailles-Chantiers towards Le Havre	TGV	Lyon-Part-Dieu towards Marseille
Preceding station	RER	Following station
Massy–Verrières towards Aéroport Charles de Gaulle 2 TGV or Mitry–Claye	RER B	Palaiseau towards Saint-Rémy-lès-Chevreuse
Massy–Verrières towards Pontoise	RER C	Terminus
Preceding station	Transilien	Following station
Igny towards Versailles-Chantiers	Line V	Terminus
Preceding station	Ouigo	Following station
Juvisy towards Paris-Austerlitz	Train Classique	Versailles-Chantiers towards Nantes
Preceding station	Tram	Following station
Terminus	T12	Massy-Europe towards Évry-Courcouronnes

Future services
Preceding station	Paris Metro	Following station
Marguerite Perey towards Christ de Saclay	Line 18 (2026)	Terminus
Location

Massy–Palaiseau (French pronunciation: [masi palɛzo]) is a train station in the city of Massy. It is a junction of the RER B, RER C, Transilien Line V and tramway Line 12. In the future, Paris Métro Line 18 of Grand Paris Express will stop here. It is a station in this southern outer suburb of Paris, with a connection to the Massy TGV station.
