= Vincent Dufour =

French football manager (born 1968)

Personal information
- Date of birth: 24 May 1968 (age 58)
- Place of birth: Longjumeau, France
- Position: Midfielder

Senior career*
Years	Team	Apps	(Gls)
1978–1981	Saint-Maurice		
1981–1983	Paris Université Club		
1983–1985	Rennes	0	(0)
1985–1992	Morangis		
1994–1995	Viry-Châtillon		
1995–1996	Haguenau		
1996	Amicale de Lucé		
1996–1997	RCP Fontainebleau	9	(0)

Managerial career
- 1999–2004: Romorantin
- 2004–2005: Chamois Niortais
- 2005–2006: Beveren
- * Club domestic league appearances and goals

Vincent Dufour (born 24 May 1968) is a French football manager and former player. Having spent his playing career at lower-league levels, he has managed former Belgian Pro League side K.S.K. Beveren as well as then French Ligue 2 outfit Chamois Niortais.
