= Carte Imagine'R =

Parisian discount travel card for citizens

The imagine R Ticket is a travel pass for students and young people (aged between 12 and 25). It provides unlimited public transport in Paris and Île-de-France on all services provided by the RATP (the regional public transport authority) and SNCF (the state-owned national railway operator). It is valid for 1 year from the date of issue, and can be renewed.

== Eligibility ==
The imagine R Ticket is provided to:

- Those either under 16 years of age
- Those under 26 years old and following an initial training course of a minimum of 350 theoretical hours in a higher education institution or an institution providing post-secondary education approved by the French Ministry of Education (students on vocational training contracts are excluded).
