= Longjumeau =

Commune in Île-de-France, France

- Commune
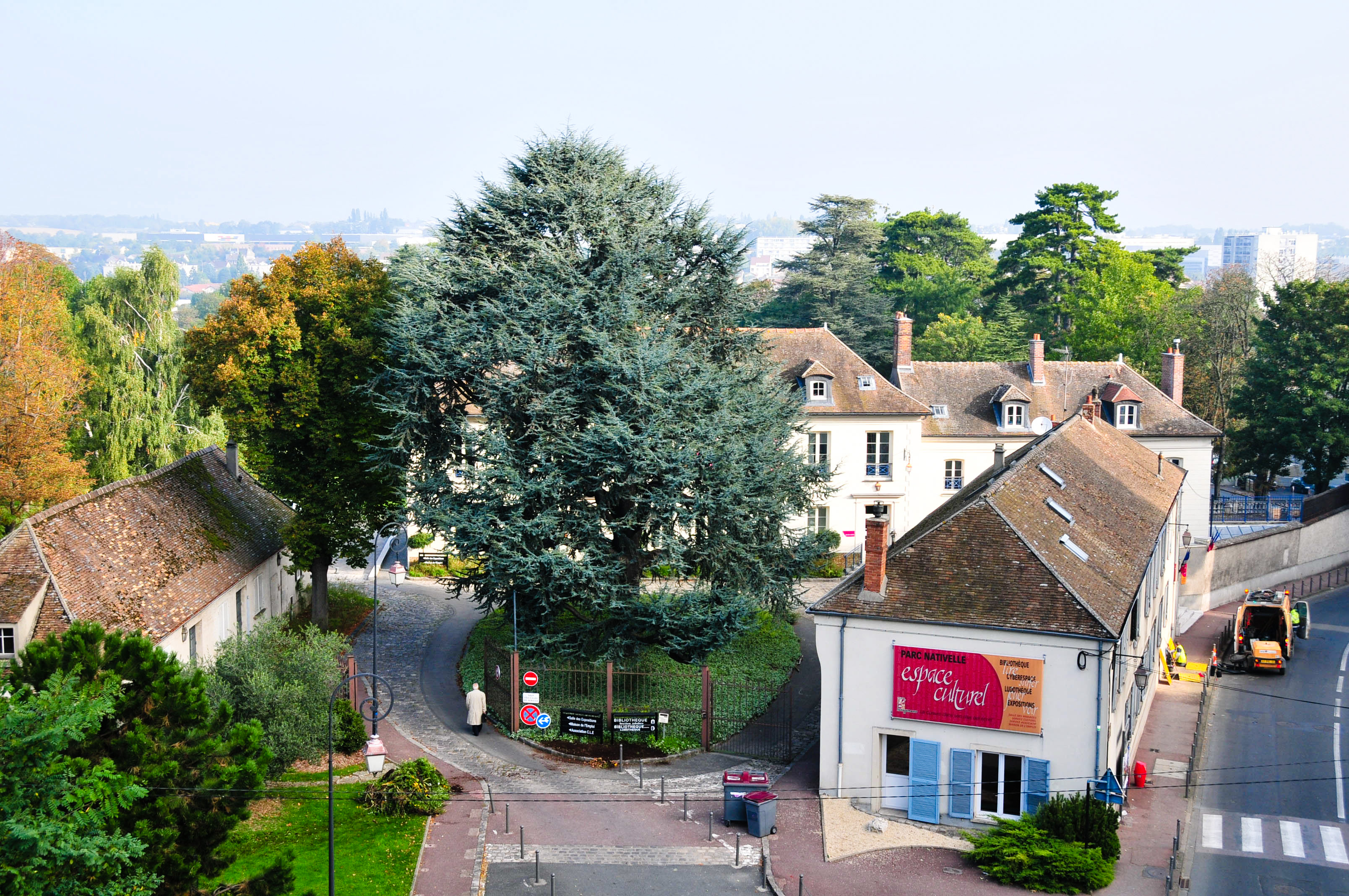
- Nativelle Park

- Coat of arms

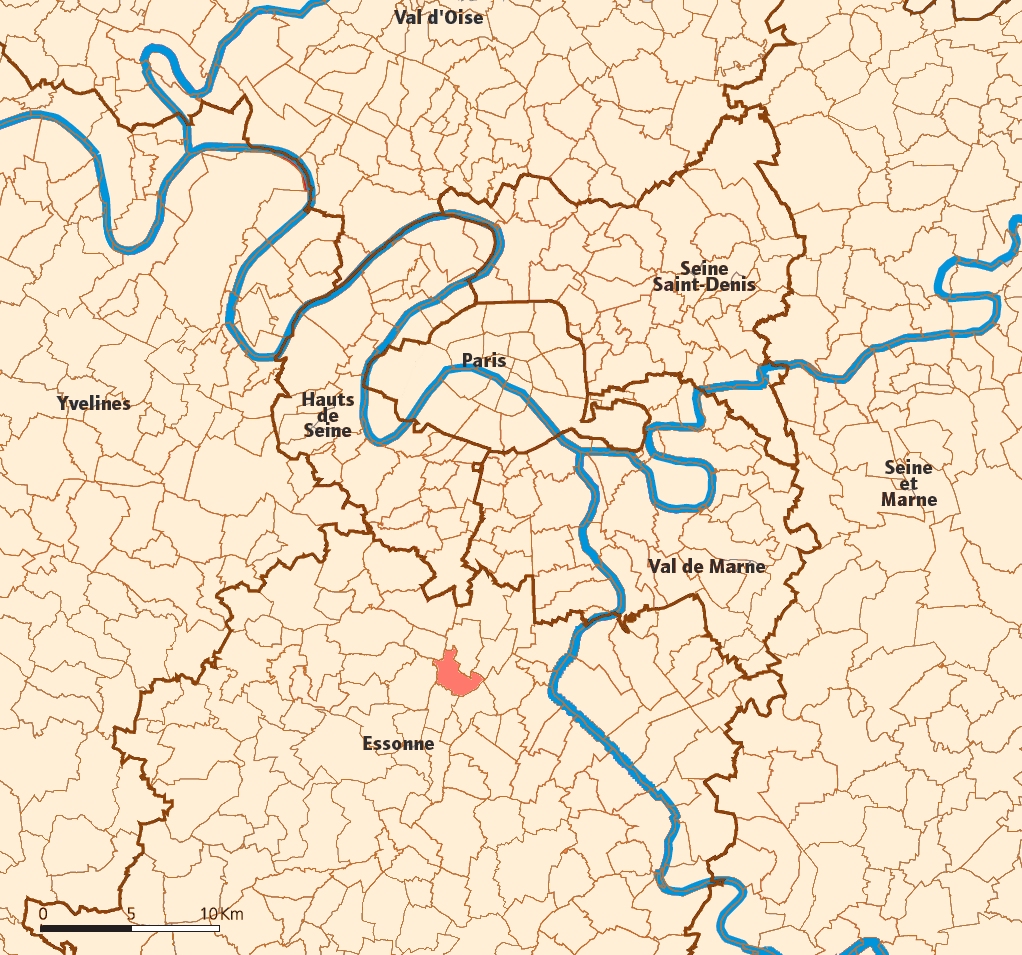
- Location (in red) within Paris inner and outer suburbs
- Location of Longjumeau
- Location within France Location within Île-de-France (region)
- Coordinates: 48°41′39″N 2°17′45″E
- Country: France
- Region: Île-de-France
- Department: Essonne
- Arrondissement: Palaiseau
- Canton: Longjumeau
- Intercommunality: CA Paris-Saclay

Government
  - Mayor (2020–2026): Sandrine Gelot (LR)
- Area^{1}: 4.84 km^{2} (1.87 sq mi)
- Highest elevation: 93 m (305 ft)
- Lowest elevation: 40 m (130 ft)
- Population (2023): 21,996
  - Density: 4,540/km^{2} (11,800/sq mi)
- Demonym: Longjumellois
- Time zone: UTC+01:00 (CET)
  - Summer (DST): UTC+02:00 (CEST)
- INSEE/Postal code: 91345 /91160
- Website: www.longjumeau.fr
- ^{1} French Land Register data, which excludes lakes, ponds, glaciers > 1 km^{2} (0.386 sq mi or 247 acres) and river estuaries.

Longjumeau (French pronunciation: [lɔ̃ʒymo]) is a commune in the Essonne department, France. It is located 18.2 km (11.3 mi) south from the center of Paris. Inhabitants of Longjumeau are known as Longjumellois (French pronunciation: [lɔ̃ʒymɛlwa]) in French.

== History ==
In 1911, Lenin founded the Longjumeau Party School to provide instruction to selected militants of the Russian Social Democratic Workers Party who would travel from Russia to attend. There were 18 students, with three each from Moscow and St Petersburg, with the rest coming from across the Russian Empire. Lenin was the principal lecturer delivering 56 lectures on diverse subjects. Other instructors included: Nikolai Semashko, David Riazanov, Charles Rappoport, Inessa Armand, Zdzisław Leder ^{pl}, and Anatoli Lunacharsky.

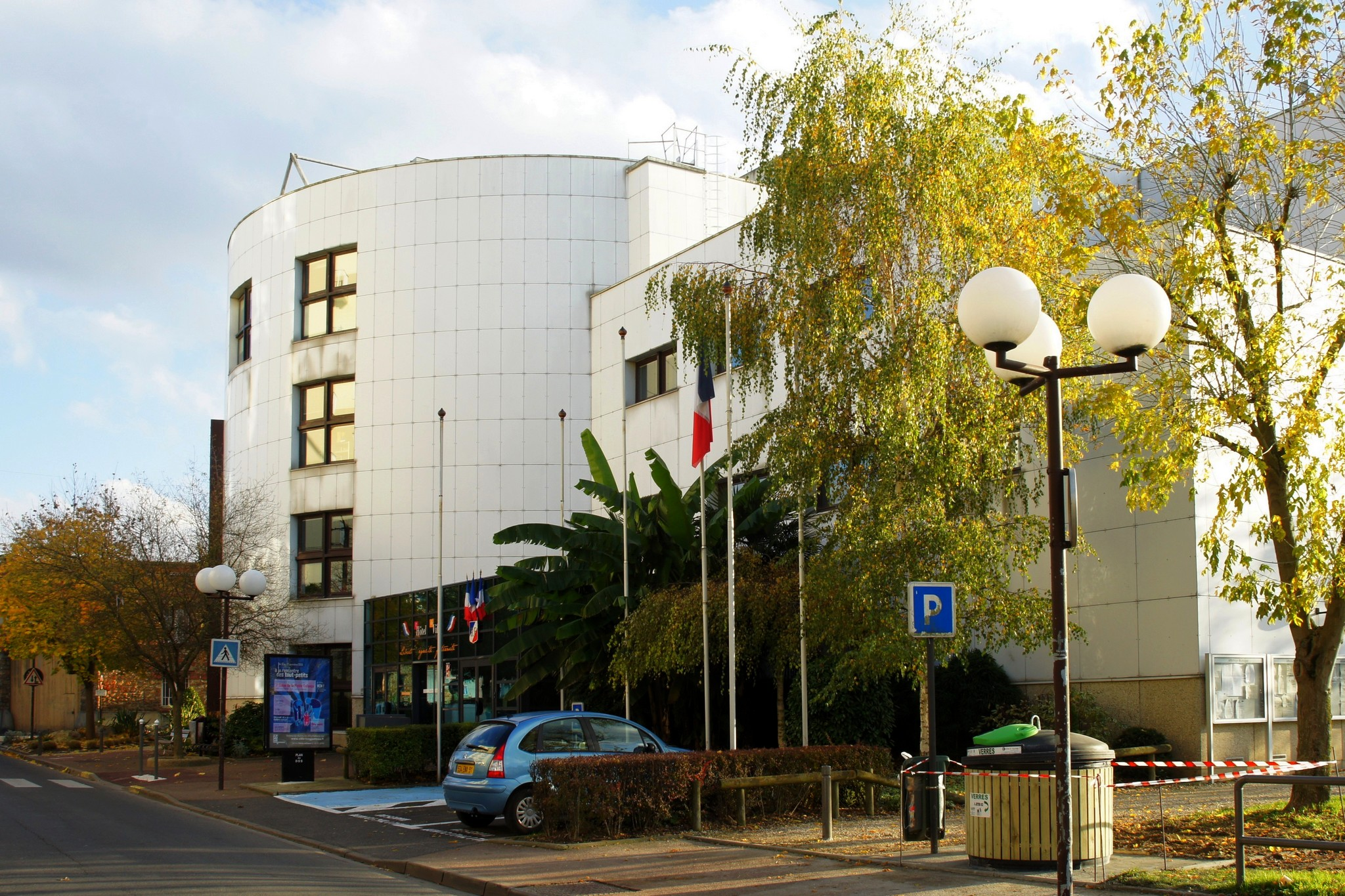
The Hôtel de Ville

The Hôtel de Ville was completed in 1997.

== Population ==
Historical population

Year	Pop.	±% p.a.
1793	2,030	—
1800	1,377	−5.39%
1806	2,022	+6.61%
1821	1,595	−1.57%
1831	2,038	+2.48%
1836	1,946	−0.92%
1841	1,998	+0.53%
1846	1,849	−1.54%
1851	1,991	+1.49%
1856	1,906	−0.87%
1861	2,256	+3.43%
1866	2,317	+0.54%
1872	2,301	−0.12%
1876	2,314	+0.14%
1881	2,585	+2.24%
1886	2,693	+0.82%
1891	2,551	−1.08%
1896	2,440	−0.89%
1901	2,343	−0.81%

Year	Pop.	±% p.a.
1906	2,344	+0.01%
1911	2,425	+0.68%
1921	2,538	+0.46%
1926	2,735	+1.51%
1931	3,106	+2.58%
1936	3,014	−0.60%
1946	3,010	−0.01%
1954	3,637	+2.39%
1962	5,522	+5.36%
1968	12,929	+15.23%
1975	18,170	+4.98%
1982	18,370	+0.16%
1990	19,864	+0.98%
1999	19,957	+0.05%
2007	21,166	+0.74%
2012	21,739	+0.54%
2017	21,221	−0.48%
2023	21,996	+0.60%

Source: EHESS and INSEE (1968–2023)

== Transport ==
Longjumeau is served by three stations on Paris RER line C: Longjumeau, Gravigny – Balizy and Chilly Mazarin RER, which are peaceful due to the low transit.

== Education ==
As of 2016 the six communal preschools (écoles maternelles) had 895 students, and the six communal elementary schools had 1,432 students, making a total of 2,377 students. Schools include:

- Public preschools: Albert Schweitzer, Balizy, Jean Bernose, Maryse Bastié, Charles Perrault, and Albert Gubanski
- Public elementary schools: Albert Schweitzer, Jules Ferry, Hélène Boucher, Antoine de Saint-Exupéry, Georges Guynemer, and Balizy
- Public junior high schools: Collège Louis Pasteur, Collège André Marois, Collège Pablo Picasso
- Public senior high schools/sixth-form colleges: Lycée Jacques-Prévert and Lycée des Métiers Jean-Perrin
- Private schools: Ecole Maternelle les Saules and Ecole Privée Saint-Anne

== Personalities ==
- Nicolas Charles Seringe, was a French physician and botanist born in Longjumeau.
- Marc Lavoine, is a French singer and actor.
- Loïc Loval, footballer
- Terence Baya, footballer
- Vincent Dufour, is a French former football player who is now a manager.
- Bingourou Kamara, footballer
- Benjamin Mendy, former Manchester City footballer.
- Jérémy Ménez, footballer
- Olivier Ntcham, footballer who currently plays for Swansea City.
- Stéphane Owona, footballer
- Estelle Raffai, athlete
- Ibrahima Tandia (born in Longjumeau in 1993), footballer
- Adrien Planté, is a French rugby union player
- Jamie Ryan, is an Irish bass guitarist in the French metal band Mass Hysteria.
- Nathalie Kosciusko-Morizet, often referred to by her initials NKM, is a French politician.
- Tanguy Ndombele, footballer who currently plays for Nice.
- Kenny Elissonde (professional cyclist).

== Trivia ==
Longjumeau is the setting for the opera-comique Le postillon de Lonjumeau by Adolphe Adam where it is presented as an early 19th-century rural community. The opera was first performed in Paris at the Opéra-Comique on 13 October 1836. Performances followed in London at the St. James Theatre on 13 March 1837, and in New Orleans at the Théâtre d'Orléans on 19 April 1838.

Longjumeau is twinned with Pontypool in South Wales, UK.

== See also ==
- Communes of the Essonne department
