= Carte orange =

Discontinued public transport ticket type in Paris

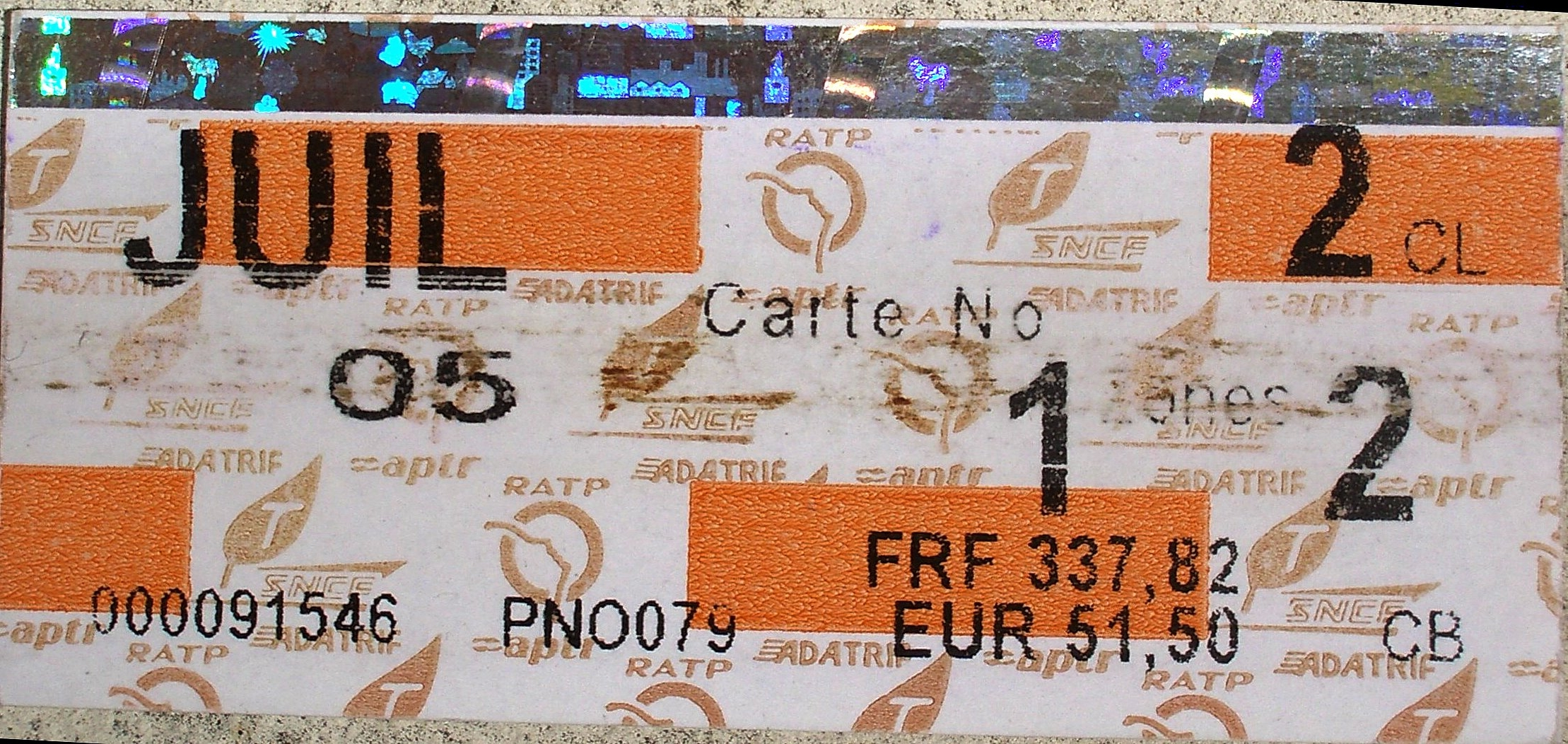
Carte Orange ticket

The Carte Orange was a multiple trip ticket for public transport in Paris, introduced in 1975 and discontinued in 2009. It was replaced by the Week Ticket and the Month Ticket, both of which require a Navigo card. The new Week Ticket allows trips on the Metro, Transilien, RER, Bus, Tram, Funicular and Cable networks in all zones, including access to airports. The new Month Ticket allows trips on the Metro, Transilien, RER, Bus, Tram, Funicular and Cable networks in all zones, including access to airports.

== History ==
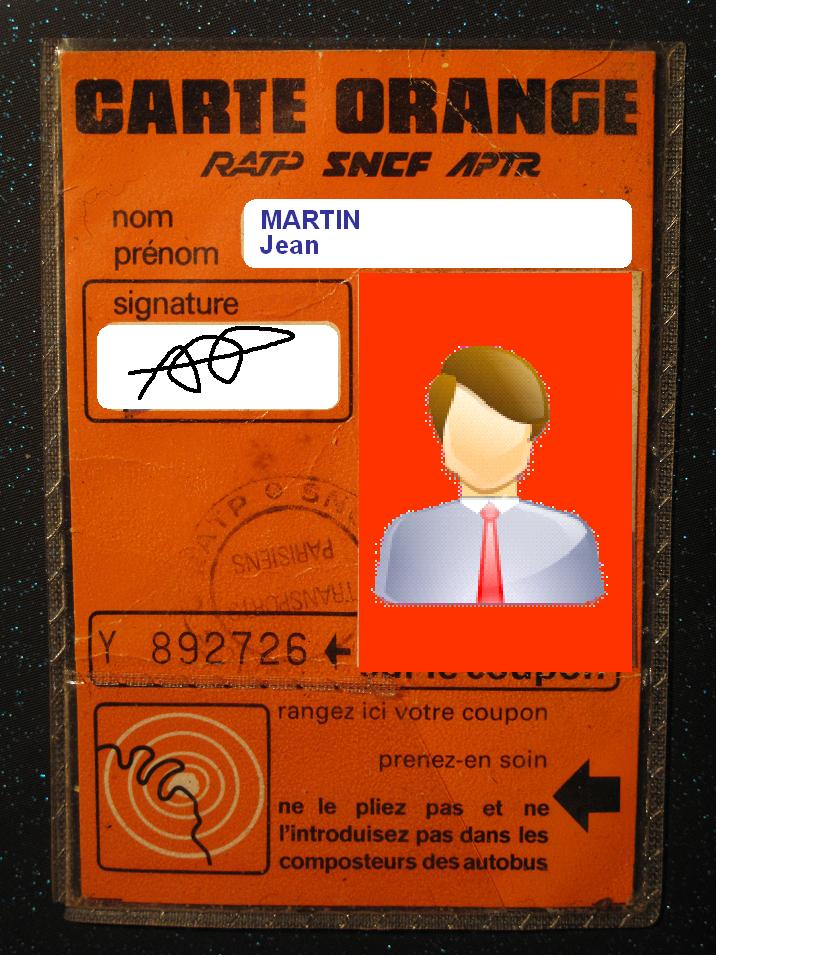
Carte Orange envelope

=== Rollout ===
The Carte Orange was launched in 1975, at a time when fare collection for public transport in Paris and the surrounding region was very complicated — in fact, someone wanting to traverse Paris at the time might have had to buy five separate tickets. The Carte Orange was novel in that it was the first ticket that gave passengers unlimited access to all of the region's public transport for a flat rate, and during a specific period of time.

Initially, the Carte Orange was only available to workers, who had to supply proof of employment in order to purchase it. This restriction was soon removed, however, and the ticket became very popular — in fact, while transport authorities had estimated that 650,000 tickets would be sold, within 6 months of its introduction 900,000 were in use. According to Michel Margairaz, a historian of Parisian transport, the gap between these figures can be explained due to a problem in the transport authorities' methodology. They assumed that only those users who would save money with the new ticket would buy one, but this was not to be the case. Many people were attracted to the idea of using public transport without worrying about tickets or fares, even if it proved to be more expensive.

Public transport revenues, not only passenger convenience, were central concerns for the tickets architects. According to Paul Josse, an official involved in the creation of the Carte Orange, the new ticket "couldn't cost the state or municipal governments a sou." Furthermore, the RATP and the SNCF were both responsible for Île de France and national public transport and had to work out a revenue-sharing scheme but this proved to be relatively easy.

The Carte Orange was also intended to boost the use of public transport, then in rapid decline, due to increasing use of cars — in fact, at the end of the 1960s, the transport ministry was actually considering abolishing bus service in Paris. However, within a year of the Carte Orange's introduction, bus usage went up 40%. More generally, it has been estimated that during the first ten years of its existence, the Carte Orange led to a 20% increase in the use of Parisian public transport.

Finally, the Carte Orange was intended to make fares more equitable. Before its introduction, those who lived further from the city centre paid much more than more centrally located residents. While it seemed reasonable that those who wanted to travel further should pay more, many people who lived far from downtown Paris had to make many more connections as they travelled compared to others who travelled no further; connections for which they had to pay. The flat-rate system introduced by the Carte Orange changed this.

=== Replacement ===
In 2009, the Carte Orange was abolished and replaced by the Navigo card. The card is scanned at turnstiles and readers to validate a ticket, pass or subscription, and may be linked to an IDFM account. Thus, unlike the Carte Orange, a Navigo card may be replaced for a fee if lost or stolen.

The consequence of abolishing the Carte Orange is that it is more expensive for short-term visitors and tourists to take advantage of the maximum discounts available from periodic tickets. This is because the Navigo card must either be linked to a French account (available to residents only) or purchased for a fee (€5 for Navigo Découverte or €2 for Navigo Easy).

== Validity ==
The Carte Orange was valid for all modes of public transport in Paris and Île de France, within a given period of time, and within a given number of zones. A weekly Carte Orange's validity always started on a Monday and ended on a Sunday. A monthly Carte Orange's validity always started on a 1st and ended on a 31st.

== Operation ==
The Carte Orange was composed of a metro ticket and an identity card, both of which were stored in a transparent, flexible, plastic folder.

The metro ticket was small and rectangular, composed mainly of stiff paper (similar to the Ticket t+), and listed the period of time and number of zones for which it was valid. On the front side of the metro ticket was a thin holographic strip to prevent counterfeiting. On the back side of the metro ticket was a brown magnetic strip to store data. The user fed the metro ticket into a turnstile machine and the machine returned it. The user did not validate the metro ticket electronically upon boarding a bus or tram; they showed the driver who then determined whether or not it was valid.

The identity card was an attempt on the part of the public transport authorities to link each Carte Orange to one person, preventing multiple people from sharing one Carte Orange. The identity card featured space for the user to print their full name, address and affix a passport-sized photo. Photo booths were often located near ticket offices.

The Carte Orange had several features intended to make fraud more difficult; the date of each carte's validity was printed in large characters, a holographic strip was added, and a new kind of ink was introduced. Before the introduction of these new security features, it was estimated that 2.5% of all Carte Orange's were counterfeit.

As an additional security measure, many Paris Metro turnstiles did not accept the same Carte Orange ticket more than once in a short lapse of time. In the event that someone accidentally exited a station prematurely (by following the wrong signs, for instance), it may have been necessary to wait (usually only a few minutes) before re-using the ticket. The intention of this mechanism was to prevent multiple passengers from using a single Carte Orange to enter an unmonitored metro station.

It was not possible to travel with a Carte Orange beyond the zones that it was valid for, and the transportation authority required travellers to purchase a ticket for the entire trip, regardless of the zones already covered by the Carte Orange. Whilst some stations had special ticket offices that sold extensions for arriving passengers who needed them, others did not. This sometimes resulted in a traveller being stuck inside a station until they could attract the attention of an employee, or jump the turnstile. The Charles de Gaulle Airport RER stop was, unfortunately for tourists, one of those stations that did not have an accessible ticket office.

== See also ==
- Navigo card
- Public transport fares in the Île-de-France
