= Stéphane Owona =

French-Ivorian footballer (born 1985)

Stephane Owona
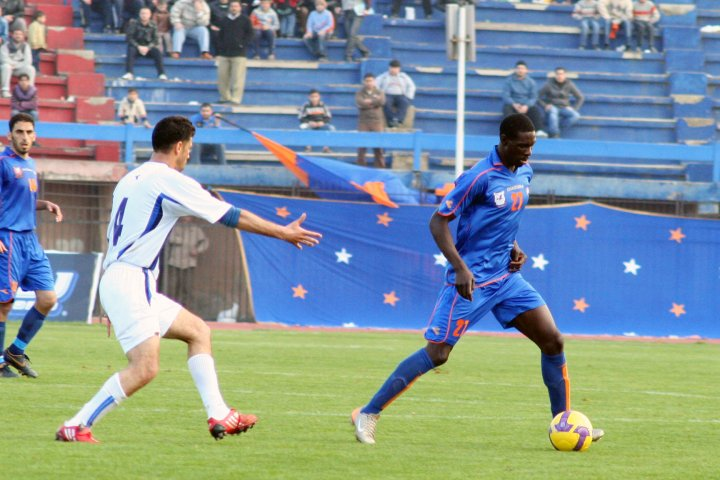

Personal information
- Full name: Stephane Owona
- Date of birth: 29 July 1985 (age 41)
- Place of birth: Longjumeau
- Height: 1.84 m (6 ft 0 in)
- Position: Striker

Team information
- Current team: al bashaer club
- Number: 19

Youth career
- 98\2000 c.s bretigny: 2000\03 ternana calcio

Senior career*
Years	Team	Apps	(Gls)
2003–2004	ASD Cossatese	7	(0)
2008–2009	Ermis Aradippou	12	(1)
2009–2009	Al-Karamah	6	(2)
2009–2009	Al-Karamah	?	(?)
2011-2011	FC Avirons	18	(5)
2012-2012	Meaux	20	(7)
2013-2013	Al Basher	22	(3)
2014-2017	Meaux	58	(10)
- * Club domestic league appearances and goals as of 13 June 2009

Stéphane Owona (born 29 July 1985) is a French-Ivorian football player. He currently plays for CS Meaux.

A player trained as a midfielder but who can also evolve as an attacker as well. Player with good technique and good vision. He started playing football at FC Longjumeau and soon joined CS Bretigny Football.

After trying in Troyes, PSG, Amiens, he finally signed to Italy (Ternana Calcio).

In Italy his playmates are: Houssine Kharja, Fabrizio Miccoli, Luis Jiménez.

Then he went into exile in Cyprus, Ermis and participated greatly to the top level of Cyprus first league and then joined the biggest Syrian team Al Karamah winning the championship and the cup. he participed also to the AFC champions league.
