= Optile =

French public transport organisation

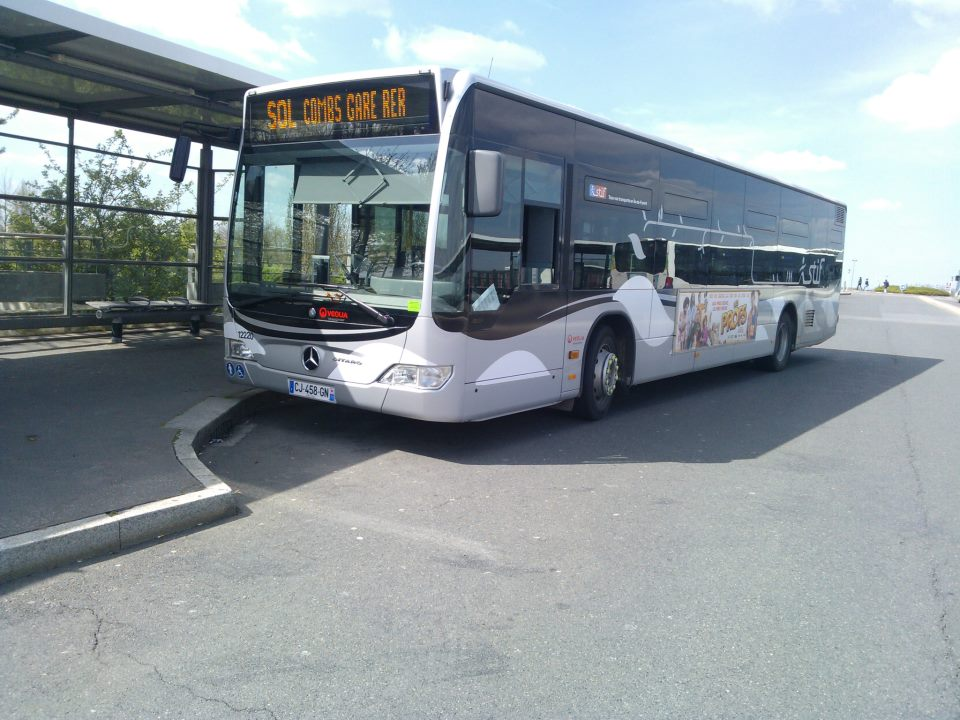
A Mercedes-Benz Citaro II operated by Optile

Optile (Organisation Professionnelle des Transports d'Île-de-France, or Professional Transport Organisation of Île-de-France) is a public transport organisation, created in October 2000 from a merger between several private bus companies serving suburban Paris. It regulates bus routes under the authority of Île-de-France Mobilités, the region's transport authority.

== Key facts ==
- 1,070 bus lines
- 1,100 of the 1,300 communes of Île-de-France served
- 24,000 bus stops
- 250 million passenger journeys per year
