= Public transport fares in the Île-de-France =

Public transport fares in the Île-de-France are determined by Île-de-France Mobilités, the regional autorité organisatrice de transports ("Regional Transport Organisational Authority"). The authority sells a variety of fare types. Single use tickets are intended for infrequent travellers whilst multiple use passes are intended for frequent travellers. Fares can be validated with a Bank card, Navigo card, or an SMS.

== Fare types ==
=== Single use tickets ===
==== Métro-Train-RER Ticket ====
- A Métro-Train-RER Ticket costs €2.55 for adults and €1.30 for children ages 4-10. The fare is valid for Métro, RER, Transilien and Funicular journeys, up to 120 minutes, including all connections inside the network and some connections outside the network. The fare is not valid for journeys to and from the airports. The fare can be validated with a Navigo Easy Travel Card, or a Navigo on Smartphone.

==== Bus-Tram Ticket ====
- A Bus-Tram Ticket costs €2.05 for adults and €1.05 for children ages 4-10. The fare is valid for Tram, Bus and Cable journeys, up to 90 minutes, including connections. The fare is valid for journeys to and from the airports. The fare can be validated with a Navigo Easy Travel Card, or a Navigo on Smartphone.

==== Airports Ticket ====
- An Airports Ticket costs €14 for adults and €7 for children ages 4-10. The fare is valid for Métro, RER, Transilien and Orlyval journeys, up to 120 minutes, including all connections inside the network and some connections outside the network. The fare is valid for journeys to and from the airports. The fare can be validated with a Navigo Easy Travel Card, or a Navigo on Smartphone.

==== Onboard Access Ticket - Bank Card ====
- An Onboard Access Ticket - Bank Card costs €2.55. The fare is valid for Funicular and Bus journeys, up to 60 minutes, excluding connections. The fare is valid for journeys to and from the airports. The fare can be validated with a CB, Mastercard, or a Visa bank card.

==== Onboard Access Ticket - SMS ====
- An Onboard Access Ticket - SMS costs €2.55. The fare is valid for Bus journeys, up to 60 minutes, excluding connections. The fare is valid for journeys to and from the airports. The fare can be validated with a Bouygues Telecom, Free Mobile, Orange, or an SFR SMS.

=== Multiple use passes ===
==== Day Pass ====
- A Day Pass costs €12.30. The fare is valid for Métro, RER, Transilien, Funicular, Tram, Bus and Cable journeys. The fare is valid for one day (not the next 24 hours) and is obtainable in advance. The fare is not valid for journeys to and from the airports. The fare can be validated with any Navigo card.

==== Week Pass ====
- A Week Pass costs €32.40. The fare is valid for Métro, RER, Transilien, Funicular, Tram, Bus and Cable journeys. The fare is valid for one week (not the next 7 days) and is obtainable from Friday (week before) to Thursday (week of). The fare is valid for journeys to and from the airports. The fare can be validated with a Navigo Travel Card, Navigo Découverte Travel Card, or a Navigo on Smartphone.

==== Month Pass ====
- A Month Pass costs €90.80. The fare is valid for Métro, RER, Transilien, Funicular, Tram, Bus and Cable journeys. The fare is valid for one month (not the next 4 weeks) and is obtainable from 20th (month before) to 19th (month of). The fare is valid for journeys to and from the airports. The fare can be validated with a Navigo Travel Card, Navigo Découverte Travel Card, or a Navigo on Smartphone.

==== Year Pass ====
- A Year Pass costs €998.80. The fare is valid for Métro, RER, Transilien, Funicular, Tram, Bus and Cable journeys. The fare is valid for one year (the next 12 months) and is obtainable in advance. The fare is valid for journeys to and from the airports. The fare can be validated with a Navigo Travel Card, or a Navigo on Smartphone.

==== Paris Visite Pass ====
- A Paris Visite Pass costs €30.60 for one day, €45.40 for two days, €63.80 for three days or €78 for five days. The fare is valid for Métro, RER, Transilien, Funicular, Tram, Bus, Cable and Orlyval journeys. The fare is valid for one day (not the next 24 hours), two days (not the next 48 hours), three days (not the next 72 hours) or five days (not the next 120 hours) and is obtainable in advance. The fare is valid for journeys to and from the airports. The fare can be validated with a Navigo Easy Travel Card, or a Navigo on Smartphone.

==== Antipollution Pass ====
- An Antipollution Pass costs €5.10. The fare is valid for Métro, RER, Transilien, Funicular, Tram, Bus and Cable journeys. The fare is valid for one day (not the next 24 hours) and is obtainable on polluted days. The fare is valid for journeys to and from the airports. The fare can be validated with any Navigo card.

==== Fête de la Musique Pass ====
- A Fête de la Musique Pass costs €4.30. The fare is valid for Métro, RER, Transilien, Funicular, Tram, Bus and Cable journeys. The fare is valid for one night (the next 14 hours) and is obtainable on 21 June. The fare is valid for journeys to and from the airports. The fare can be validated with any Navigo card.

==== Liberté+ ====
- Liberté+ costs €2.04 for Métro, RER, Transilien and Funicular journeys, €1.64 for Tram, Bus and Cable journeys or €14 for Métro, RER, Transilien and Orlyval journeys to and from the airports. The fare is valid for Métro, RER, Transilien, Funicular, Tram, Bus, Cable and Orlyval journeys, up to 120 minutes, including connections. The fare is valid for journeys to and from the airports. The fare can be validated with a Navigo Travel Card, or a Navigo on Smartphone. The fare is available via a subscription. The fare is billed once a month via a BIC or IBAN bank account. The fare is capped at €12.30 per day for Métro, RER, Transilien, Funicular, Tram, Bus and Cable journeys. The fare is not capped for Métro, RER, Transilien and Orlyval journeys to and from the airports.

=== Fare matrix ===
Fare Matrix (1 January 2026)
Fare in English	Fare in French	Price	Valid to store	Valid to use	Rules
Métro-Train-RER Ticket	Billet Métro-Train-RER	€2.55	Navigo Easy Travel Card, Navigo on Smartphone	Métro, RER, Transilien, Funicular	Valid for 120 minutes, Not valid to/from/between airports, Includes transfers
Bus-Tram Ticket	Billet Bus-Tram	€2.05	Navigo Easy Travel Card, Navigo on Smartphone	Tram, Bus, Cable	Valid for 90 minutes, Valid to/from/between airports, Includes transfers
Airports Ticket	Billet Aéroports	€14	Navigo Easy Travel Card, Navigo on Smartphone	Métro, RER, Transilien, Orlyval	Valid for 120 minutes, Valid to/from/between airports, Includes transfers
Onboard Access Ticket - Bank Card	Billet d'accès à bord - Carte Bancaire	€2.55	CB, Mastercard, Visa	Funicular, Bus	Valid for 60 minutes, Valid to/from/between airports, Excludes transfers
Onboard Access Ticket - SMS	Billet d'accès à bord - SMS	€2.55	Bouygues Telecom, Free Mobile, Orange, SFR	Bus	Valid for 60 minutes, Valid to/from/between airports, Excludes transfers
Day Pass	Forfait Jour	€12.30	Navigo Travel Card, Navigo Découverte Travel Card, Navigo Easy Travel Card, Navigo on Smartphone	Métro, RER, Transilien, Funicular, Tram, Bus, Cable	Valid for 1 day, Not valid to/from/between airports, Obtainable in advance
Week Pass	Forfait Semaine	€32.40	Navigo Travel Card, Navigo Découverte Travel Card, Navigo on Smartphone	Métro, RER, Transilien, Funicular, Tram, Bus, Cable	Valid from Monday to Sunday, Valid to/from/between airports, Obtainable from Friday to Thursday
Month Pass	Forfait Mois	€90.80	Navigo Travel Card, Navigo Découverte Travel Card, Navigo on Smartphone	Métro, RER, Transilien, Funicular, Tram, Bus, Cable	Valid from 1st to 31st, Valid to/from/between airports, Obtainable from 20th to 19th
Year Pass	Forfait Annuel	€998.80	Navigo Travel Card, Navigo on Smartphone	Métro, RER, Transilien, Funicular, Tram, Bus, Cable	Valid for 1 year, Valid to/from/between airports, Obtainable in advance
Paris Visite Pass	Forfait Paris Visite	Varies	Navigo Easy Travel Card, Navigo on Smartphone	Métro, RER, Transilien, Funicular, Tram, Bus, Cable, Orlyval	Valid for 1 day/2 days/3 days/5 days, Valid to/from/between airports, Obtainable in advance
Antipollution Pass	Forfait Antipollution	€5.10	Navigo Travel Card, Navigo Découverte Travel Card, Navigo Easy Travel Card, Navigo on Smartphone	Métro, RER, Transilien, Funicular, Tram, Bus, Cable	Valid for 1 day, Valid to/from/between airports, Obtainable on polluted days
Fête de la Musique Pass	Forfait Fête de la Musique	€4.30	Navigo Travel Card, Navigo Découverte Travel Card, Navigo Easy Travel Card, Navigo on Smartphone	Métro, RER, Transilien, Funicular, Tram, Bus, Cable	Valid for 1 night, Valid to/from/between airports, Obtainable on 21 June
Liberté+	Liberté+	Varies	Navigo Travel Card, Navigo on Smartphone	Métro, RER, Transilien, Funicular, Tram, Bus, Cable, Orlyval	Valid from 1st to 31st, Valid to/from/between airports, Obtainable in advance

== History ==
In 1900, a second-class Paris Métro ticket cost 15 centimes of the old franc, and a first-class ticket 25 centimes. In 1960, it cost 37 centimes of the new franc. Six hundred million Métro tickets were sold that year, an average of around 1,500 a minute.

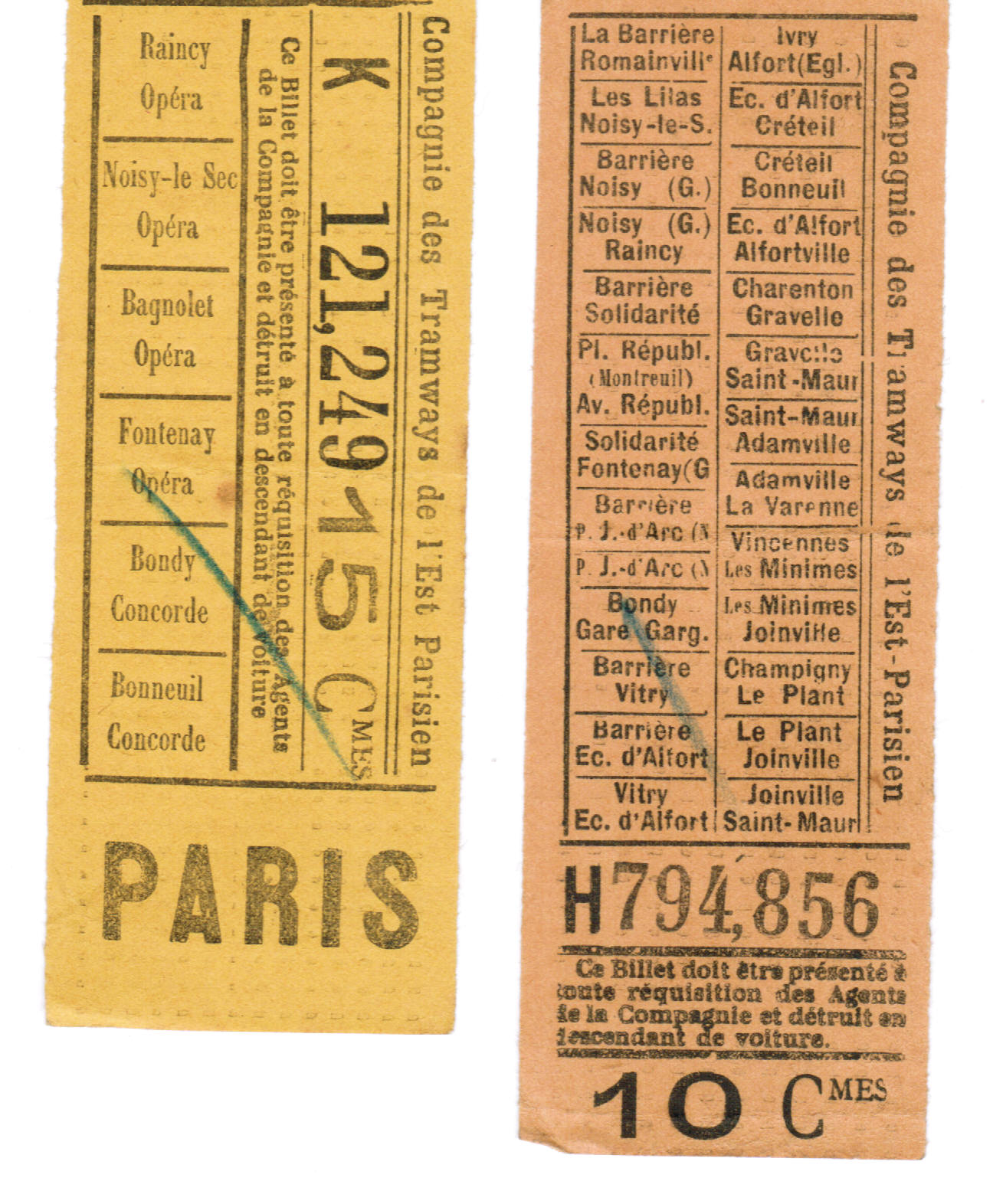
Tramway tickets issued by the Compagnie Est Parisien ("Eastern Paris Company") (before 1921)

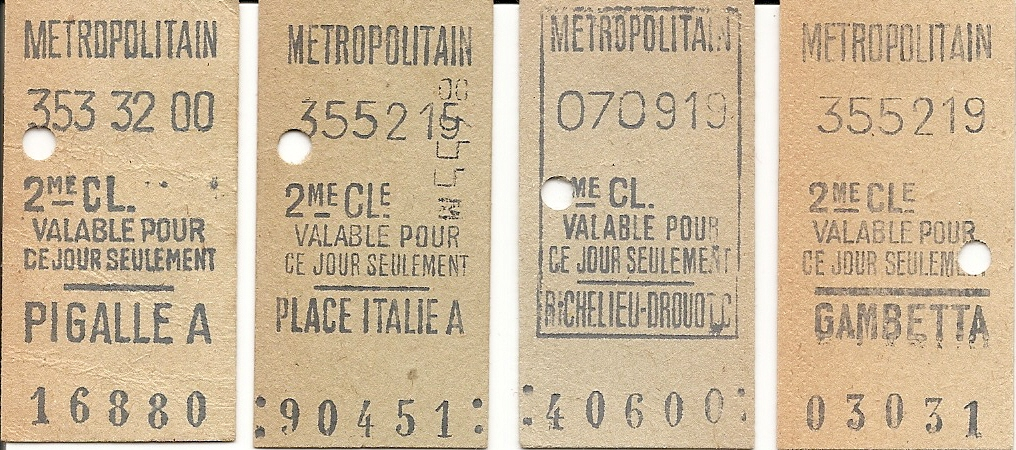
Métro tickets issued by the Compagnie du chemin de fer métropolitain de Paris (CMP) ("Paris Metropolitan Railway Company") (1900 – 1945)

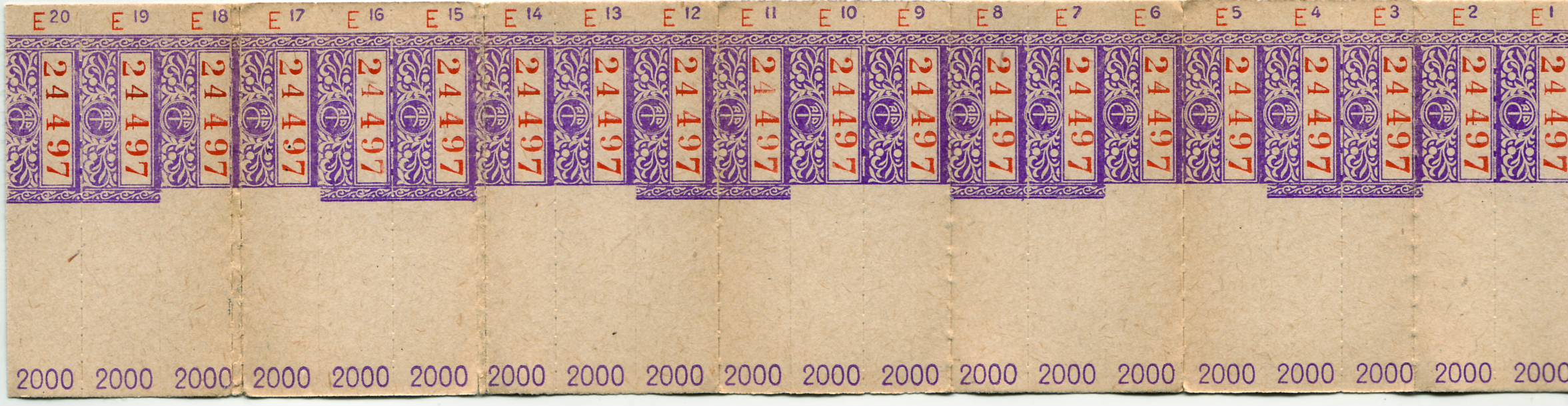
Carnet of bus tickets from the Société des transports en commun de la région parisienne (STRCP) ("Paris region public transport society") (1921 – 1948)

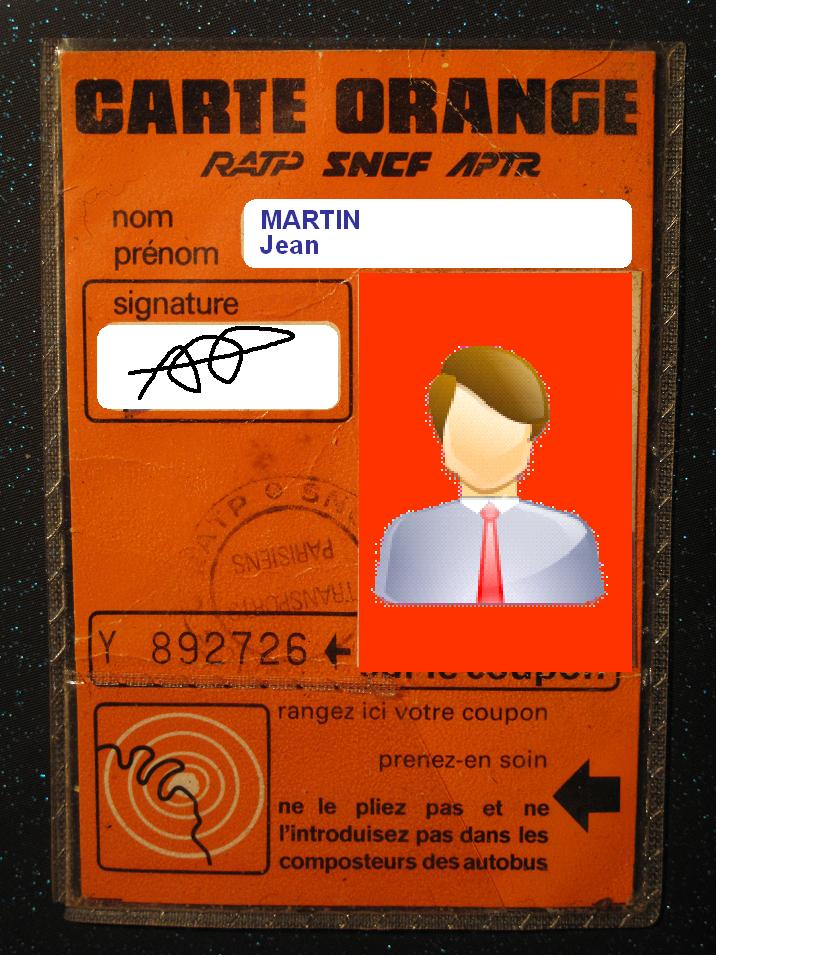
First design of the Carte Orange (1975)

In 1991, first class was abolished on the Métro, and in 1999 on the rest of the railway network in Île-de-France.

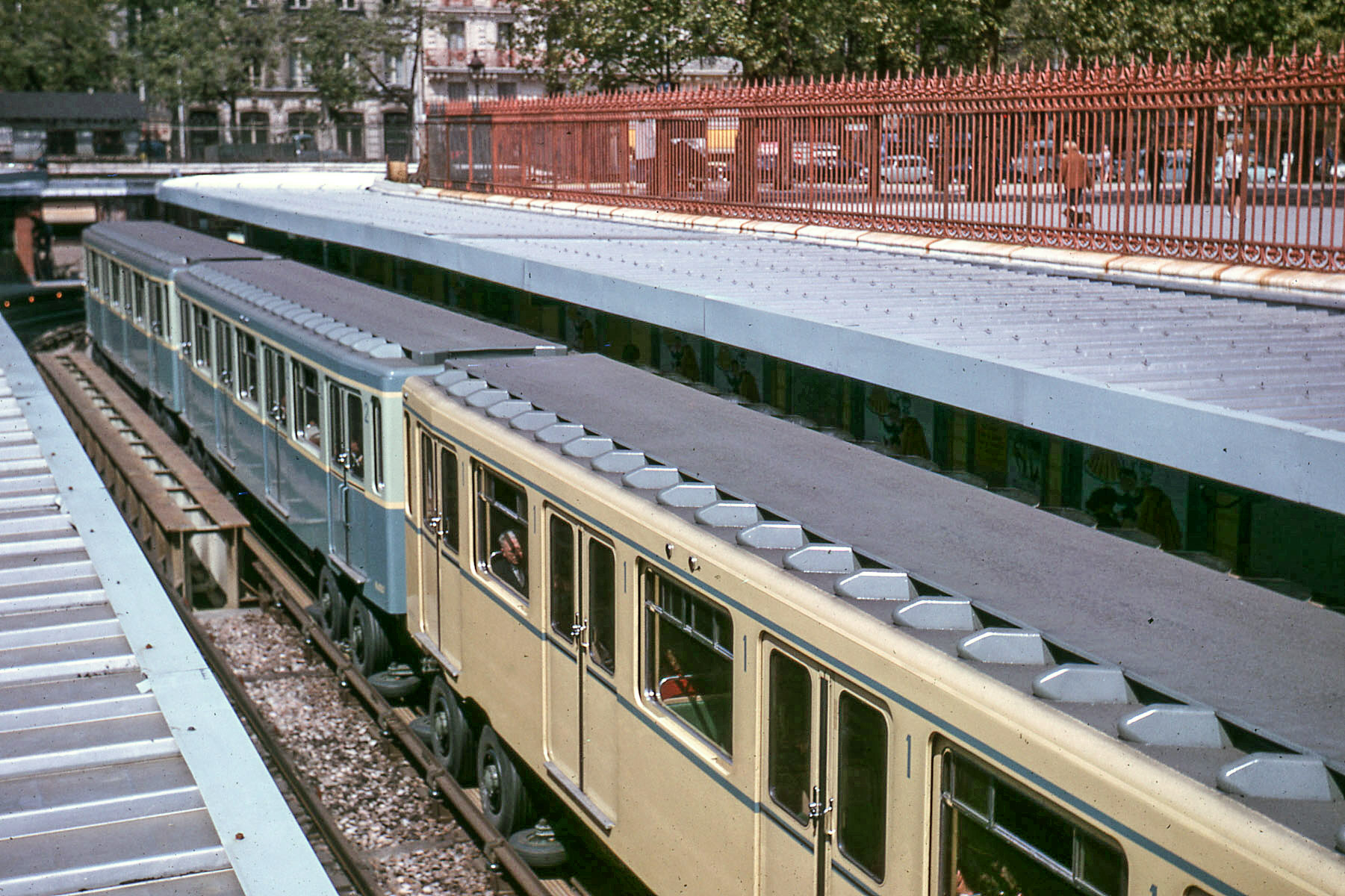
MP 59 in 1964: first class in yellow and second class in blue

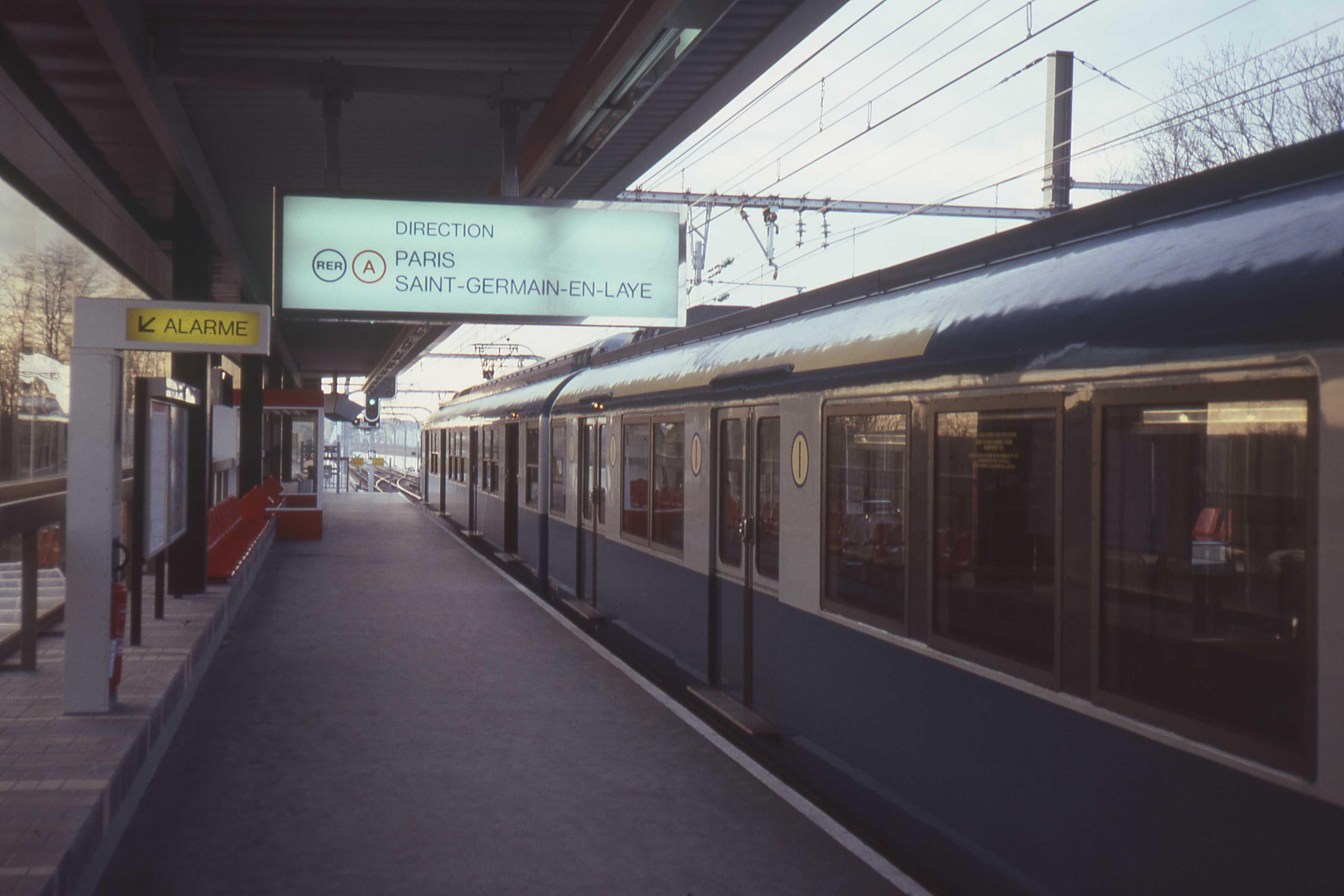
MS 61 in 1982: First class section with yellow detailing

In 1991, the public transport network of STIF (as Île-de-France Mobilités was then known) was divided into 8 zones. On 1 July 2007, zones 7 and 8 were merged into zone 6. On 1 July 2011, zone 6 was merged into zone 5. This was done to reduce transportation costs for residents of outer suburbs. On 11 February 2015, STIF voted to discontinue passes covering zones 1–2, 1–3, and 1–4, leaving only passes covering all zones (and passes covering only zones outside zone 1). The price of a monthly pass for zones 1-5 was lowered from €116.50 to €70 (which was the price of the monthly pass for zones 1-2 prior to the change). On 1 January 2025, new single tickets were introduced that are valid for all zones (except for the airports), thus abolishing the zone system.

In 2025, paper tickets were abolished and replaced entirely by the Navigo card.

Since November 2025, select bus journeys can be validated using a CB, Mastercard or Visa card, including those in a digital wallet like Apple Pay or Google Pay.

== See also ==
- Navigo card
- Transport in Paris
