= Evelyne Owona Essomba =

Cameroonian journalist (born 1977)

- Born: 24 January 1977; Yaoundé, Cameroon
- Occupation: Journalist
- Years active: 1998–present

Evelyne Owona Essomba (born Evelyne Mengue A Koung, 24 January 1977) is a Cameroonian journalist. She graduated from the 26th class of the Advanced School of Mass Communication and worked for the newspaper Mutations before joining National Television CRTV, where she worked for 22 years.

On 18 June 2021, she became the first woman to lead the Cameroonian section of the International Francophone Press Union (UPF).

== Early life and education ==
Evelyne Owona Essomba was born on 24 January 1977, in a maternity hospital in Yaoundé. Her father is from Bafia and her mother is from Lékié, specifically Sa'a. She grew up in a modest family, being the third child and the first daughter among seven children. She attended primary school at the École publique groupe 2 in Dschang and later moved to Yaoundé, where she completed her primary education at the École publique du Camp Yeyap. She then pursued her secondary education at the Lycée Général Leclerc. After obtaining her high school diploma, she enrolled in the Bilingual Letters program at the University of Yaoundé I. In 1995, while in her second year at university, she took the entrance exam for the Advanced School of Mass Communication (ESSTIC), which she successfully passed, becoming a member of the 26th class of journalists from the school (1995–1998).

== Career ==
Evelyne graduated from ESSTIC in 1998 and began her professional career at the newspaper Mutations. She was responsible for the culture and communication page until then held by one Barbara Etoa. In 1999, the then Director-General of CRTV, Gervais Mendozé, launched a recruitment drive called the 15 because 15 journalists were called upon to revitalize the newsroom. Evelyne Owona was among them. She hosted numerous TV shows such as: Special Evenings, Book of the Week.... In 2003, shortly after getting married, she decided to join her husband in Douala, where she worked for 6 years at the CRTV regional station of Littoral.

In 2009, her husband was transferred to Maroua. Once again, she requested a transfer to CRTV Extreme North, the regional station in the Extreme North region of Cameroon. She stayed there for 2 years before returning to Yaoundé in 2011, this time to settle down. Her motivations were simple: there was a call from the management soliciting her expertise regarding the wave of program restructuring at the central station.

Later, she became a news anchor: she hosted the 8:00 AM, 12:00 PM, and 6:00 PM news for 1 year. Then she presented the weekend news for 6 months. Finally, she was promoted to the prime-time news.

On 30 January 2021, after 22 years at National Television, Essomba was appointed Head of Channel Crtv News for the new 24-hour news channel of CRTV.

A member of the International Francophone Press Union (UPF) for 23 years, Essomba was elected president of the Cameroonian section of UPF Cameroon for a 4-year term on 18 June 2021. She obtained 61 votes out of 63 voters, becoming its first female president. Formerly Secretary-General and then vice-president, she replaced Aimé Robert Bihina, who had been president since 2012.

On Thursday, 5 May 2022, at 10:00 a.m. at ESSEC Douala, Evelyne Owona defended her PhD thesis in Information and Communication Sciences (SIC) in the presence of the Director-General of CRTV, Charles Ndongo.
