= Île-de-France Mobilités =

Transport agency for Île-de-France (Paris) region in France

- Formation: 14 December 2000; 25 years ago
- Type: Governmental
- Legal status: Établissement public à caractère administratif
- Purpose: Transport authority
- Headquarters: Paris, France
- Region served: Île-de-France
- President: Valérie Pécresse as President of the Regional Council of Île-de-France
- Director General: Laurent Probst
- Budget: 2014–15: €9.4 billion
- Staff: 568 (2023)
- Website: www.iledefrance-mobilites.fr

Île-de-France Mobilités (French: [il də fʁɑ̃s mɔbilite]; IDFM) is a governmental authority (EPA) that controls and coordinates the different public transport companies operating in Paris and the rest of Île-de-France. In this capacity, it issues operating contracts for the various services, owns the buses and rolling stock used on those services, and acts as the main financing body for transport projects in the region. It coordinates the operation of RATP Group, SNCF, and the nearly 90 Optile-affiliated bus companies.

The origins of the organization can be traced back to the Syndicat des Transports Parisiens (STP), which was created by the French Government in 1959 to coordinate the various operations in the Paris region. The STP also provided oversight for the construction of the Réseau Express Régional and established the unified Carte orange fare payment system. In 1991, the STP was empowered to cover the entire Île-de-France region.

The STP was reorganized into the Syndicat des transports d'Île-de-France (STIF) in 2000, giving the agency the ability to enter into competitive contracts with operators and more tightly control its expenses. This process of decentralization allowed the French Government to pass control of STIF to the Île-de-France regional government in 2005. In 2017, the agency was rebranded as Île-de-France Mobilités.

== History ==
The origins of Île-de-France Mobilités can be traced back to the creation of Syndicat des Transports Parisiens (STP). A prominent early activity of the organization was the creation of the Réseau Express Régional, the first line of which opened between Nation and Boissy-Saint-Léger in 1969 after seven years of construction. In 1975, as a means of simplifying the somewhat complicated fare collection across the disparate public transit systems across greater Paris, the Carte orange travel card was introduced.

In 1991, the scope of responsibilities of the STP was extended to cover the entire Île-de-France region. One year later, tramway Line 1 opened between Bobigny and Saint-Denis, ending a 35 years absence of trams in Île-de-France. In 1998, the first fully automated Métro line, Line 14, was commissioned.

Logo of the former Syndicat des transports d'Île-de-France

During 2000, the STP was reorganized and superseded by the Syndicat des transports d'Île-de-France (STIF), at which point the Île-de-France region joined the STIF Board of Directors; four years later, the national government transferred its authority on matters pertaining to public transportation in the area to STIF.

During the 2000s, in response to hundreds of incidents involving trackside intrusions being recorded, STIF launched a program to retrofit platform screen doors at many of its existing stations in order to minimize such occurrences and enhance safety. The fitting out of all non-equipped lines across a total of 650 platforms was costed at between €700 and €750 million at 2008 prices. Since 30 June 2020, a new kind of vertical platform screen doors, called platform curtains, have been installed on platform 2bis of Vanves–Malakoff station (in Paris region) on the Transilien Line N commuter rail line. Transilien stated their preference for such platform curtains for this line is due to the positioning of the doors not aligning across the rolling stock, and that they plan to install them in other Transilien stations if the experiment is successful.

In its coordinating role, STIF has been involved in the procurement of new rolling stock for multiple networks and lines, often in coordination with SNCF. On 24 February 2010, Bombardier Transportation announced that it had received a firm order for 80 Regio 2N trainsets, which included additional options for up to 860 total trainsets worth a total of €8 billion. In January 2016, SNCF ordered additional 15 Alstom Citadis Dualis tram-trains on behalf of STIF, on top of an existing order for 15 identical vehicles. One year later, an consortium comprising Alstom and Bombardier Transportation were selected to supply 255 X’Trapolis Cityduplex double-deck electric multiple units to replace aging rolling stock on lines D and E of the Île-de-France network under a €3.75 billion arrangement.

In June 2015, a contract valued at €20 million was awarded to Alstom Transport to develop and install an automatic train operation (ATO) system on RER A of the Réseau Express Régional network servicing Paris. At the time, RER A was the most heavily frequented regional line in Europe; the introduction of ATO enabled increased frequencies and improved performance on the line.

During February 2017, it was announced that STIF and the public transportation company Keolis had signed contracts valued at €750 million to partner on improving the bus network serving Greater Paris. Stated goals of these contracts included the trialing of new technologies, a reduction of fare evasion, and a general raising of service quality. In June of that year, Valérie Pécresse, President of the Île-de-France region and of the STIF, announced that the authority would change its public name to Île-de-France Mobilités.

The Île-de-France region inaugurated its first urban cable-car system, the Câble 1, on 13 December 2025, as part of a move to improve mobility for commuters and tourists alike. The line, operated by Transdev and funded by Île-de-France Mobilités, is expected to carry about 11,000 passengers daily.
