= Thiais–Orly station =

Paris Metro station in Thiais

Thiais–Orly Pont de Rungis
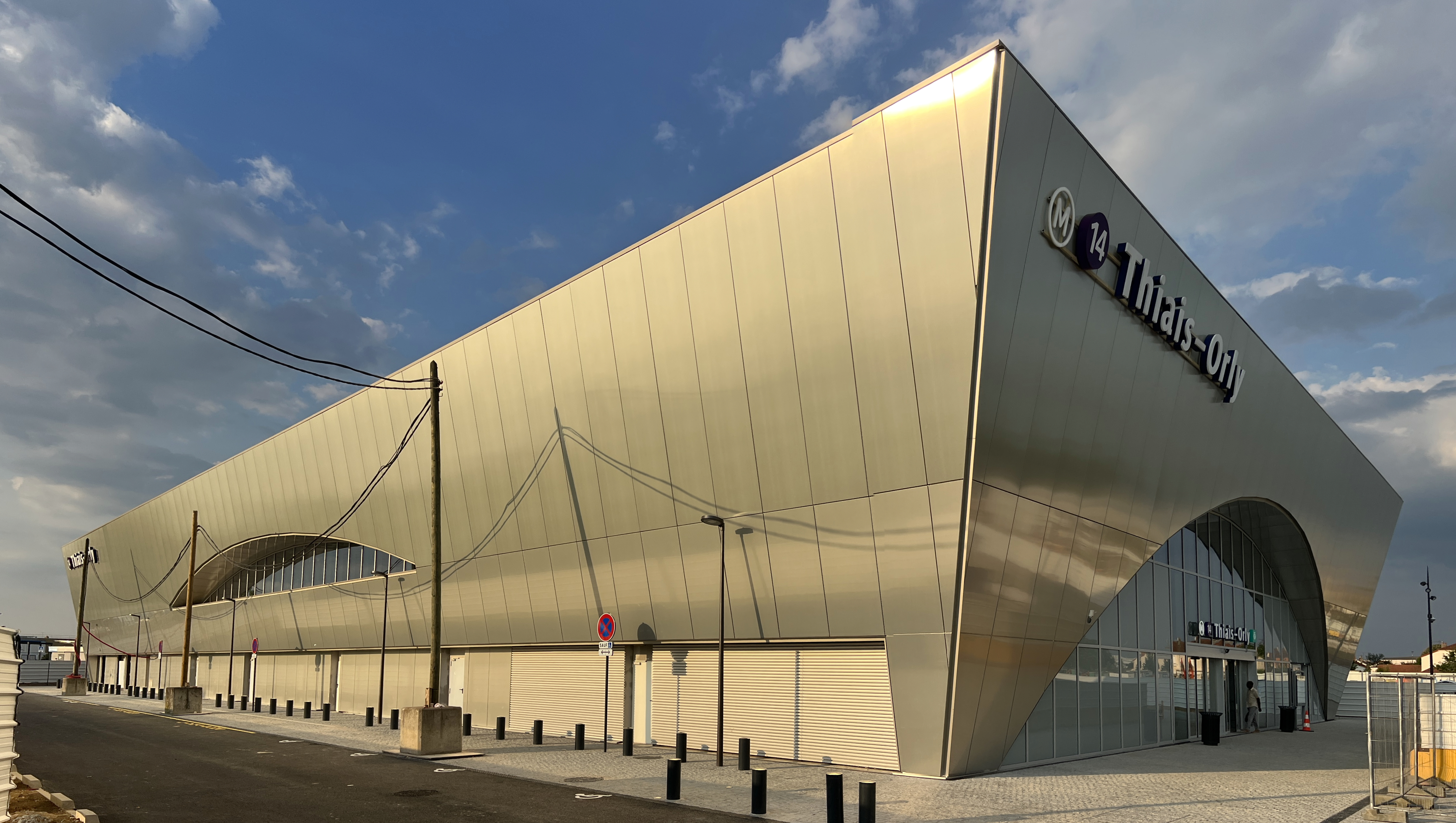
- Surface building

General information
- Location: Thiais; France
- Coordinates: 48.747367°N 2.372931°E
- Owner: Société du Grand Paris
- Operator: RATP Group
- Line: Paris Metro Paris Metro Line 14
- Platforms: 2 side platforms
- Tracks: 2
- Connections: at Pont de Rungis–Aéroport d'Orly

Construction
- Structure type: Underground
- Depth: 26 m (85 ft)
- Accessible: Yes
- Architect: Denis Valode

Other information
- Station code: GA45 / 45PDR
- Fare zone: 4

History
- Opened: 24 June 2024

Services
Preceding station	Paris Metro	Following station
Chevilly-Larue towards Saint-Denis–Pleyel	Line 14	Aéroport d'Orly Terminus
Location

Thiais–Orly (French pronunciation: [tjɛ ɔʁli]) is an underground station on Line 14 of the Paris Metro in the town of Thiais, on the outskirts of Orly Airport.

It is situated on a former car park used by Air France. Passengers access the station through a building constructed above the underground station. This building houses the entrance hall, ticketing office, fare gates, bicycle parking, and local services. The north access to the station connects to the RER C platforms. The east access building offers connections to local buses. Located south of the RER C tracks and north of avenue du Docteur-Marie, the station was built along a north–south axis.

== History ==
The station opened on 24 June 2024 as part of the southern extension of line 14 from Olympiades to Aéroport d'Orly as part of the Grand Paris Express project.

Initially, it was proposed to be named Pont de Rungis, in common with the nearby Pont de Rungis–Aéroport d'Orly on the RER and nearby bus stops. This generated some controversy and several mayors in Val-de-Marne disagreed with the chosen names for three stations, including this one, arguing they didn't reflect their actual locations. In September 2022, after feedback from public consultations, the station was renamed to its current name, Thiais–Orly, with "Pont de Rungis" retained as a subtitle.

=== Construction ===
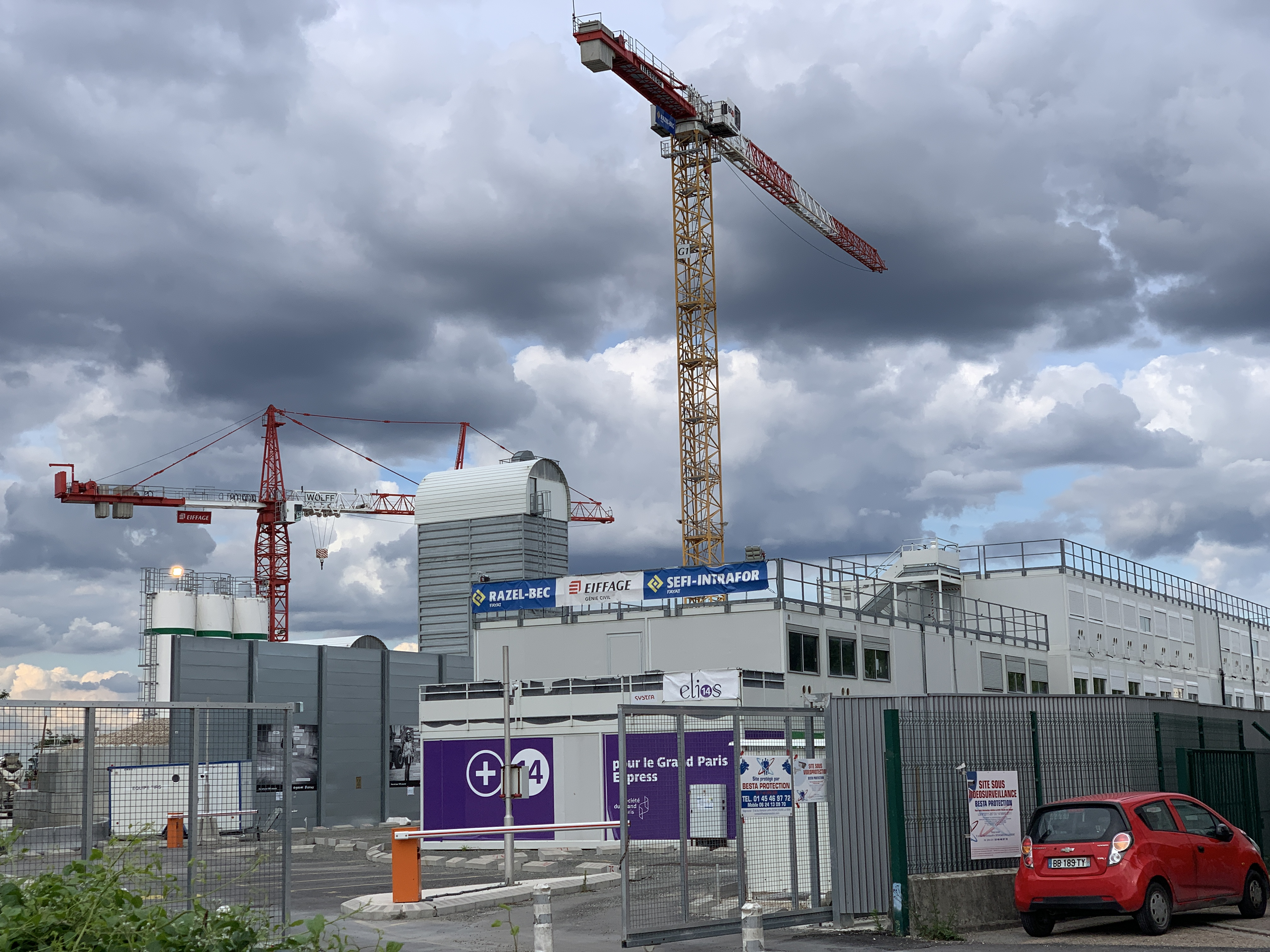
Construction in 2020

The contract for the management of the project was awarded in 2015 to a consortium led by .SETEC TPI and SYSTRA.

The contract for the construction of the station was awarded to a joint venture led by Razel-Bec (a subsidiary of Fayat Group), along with Eiffage Génie Civil, Sefi-Intrafor, Eiffage Fondations, and I.CO.P. in March 2018.

Preparatory works began in May 2016 until early 2018, with the relocation of existing utilities as well as surveying the site of the future station. Civil works were projected to begin in 2018 following the completion of the preparatory works. This involved the construction of the station building, ancillary structures, and excavation of the tunnels.

The first tunnel boring works on the southern extension of line 14 began at Thiais–Orly in June 2019 when the tunnel boring machine (TBM) Claire started to bore the 4.5 km tunnel northwards towards L'Haÿ-les-Roses, which was expected to take around 18 months. Another TBM, Koumba, which was launched in the summer of 2019, was extracted from the station site in July 2020 after having completed its 4.05 km excavation from Puits de Morangis.

Fitting-out of the station began in 2022, with the installation of escalators, elevators, granite flooring, false ceilings, wall cladding, and preparatory works for the installation of the platform façades planned to be completed by end 2023. It was planned to begin dynamic train testing in 2023.

=== Design ===
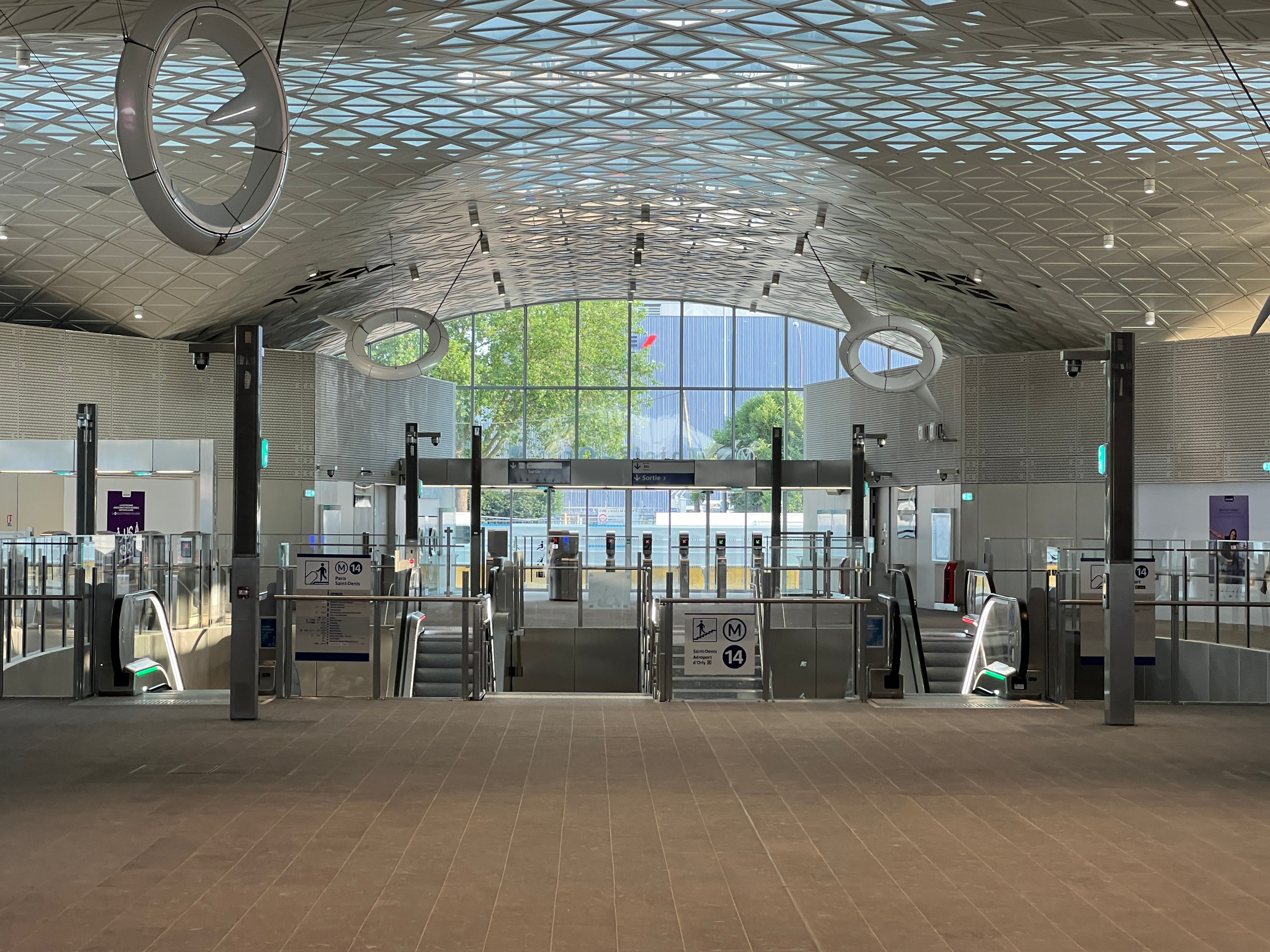
Interior of the surface building

An artwork was commissioned for the station. Titled L'écart temps, it was created by Lyes Hammadouche in collaboration with the architect Denis Valode. Composed of carbon fibre, steel, and aluminium, four suspended sculptures were created and suspended from the ceiling of the main hall, one in each of the vaults along the four cardinal directions. By reinterpreting a clock, one of the most common iconic and historical objects that can be found in train stations; it represents the passage of time by depicting rotations following the movement of celestial bodies.

The station was designed by the architectural firm Valode & Pistre. In anticipation of the three future urban development zones (one each to the east, west, and north of the station), the surface building was designed to reflect its status as the centre of these new developments. Thus, it was designed to have a large groin vault, with four barrel vaults aligned to each of the cardinal points intersecting in the middle, with a central skylight to help daylight illuminate the interior of the space. Three of the station faces contain a large arcade, providing access to the concourse. It is designed to handle approximately 30,000 passengers a day.

== Future ==
In 2025, the IDFM announced proposals to launch initial studies for a potential southwards extension of tramway line T9, with the possibility of it serving either Thiais–Orly or Orly Airport.

A new bus line is planned to be launched in 2030, connecting eastern Val-de-Marne, Thiais, and Orly Airport.

A new TGV high speed rail station is also planned to be built near the station by 2032, to help relieve congestion at Gare Montparnasse, as well as to develop an air-rail intermodality with Orly Airport while also providing TGV access to the large population there in the future.

Following the opening of the station, plans for the development of the three new mixed-use urban development zones, Cœur d'Orly, Parcs en Scène–Faubourg Métropolitain, and the ZAC Thiais-Orly, have been progressing. This will bring more development to a currently scarcely populated area surrounded by many places of employment. It will involve the construction of at least 4,844 new housing units, new shops, student accommodation, hotels, schools, and public green spaces, covering a total of 118 hectares. A new network of bicycle paths and pedestrian walkways will be built, in addition to the space allocated for cars and speed limits being reduced. This is planned to promote active transportation in the new district.

== Passenger services ==
=== Access ===
The station has three accesses:

- Access 1
- Access 2
- Access 3

=== Station layout ===
G	Street Level	Exit/Entrance
B1	Mezzanine
B2	Side platform with PSDs, doors will open on the right
B2	Northbound	← toward Saint-Denis–Pleyel (Chevilly-Larue)
B2	Southbound	toward Aéroport d'Orly (Terminus) →
B2	Side platform with PSDs, doors will open on the right

=== Platforms ===
The station has a standard configuration, with two tracks flanked by two side platforms.

=== Other connections ===
==== RER ====
The station is connected to line C of the RER via the neighbouring Pont de Rungis–Aéroport d'Orly.

==== Bus ====
Multiple bus services also serve this station.

- RATP bus network: 183, 382, 396
- Massy-Juvisy bus network: 319
- Seine Grand Orly bus network: 482
- Noctilien bus network: N22, N31

== Gallery ==
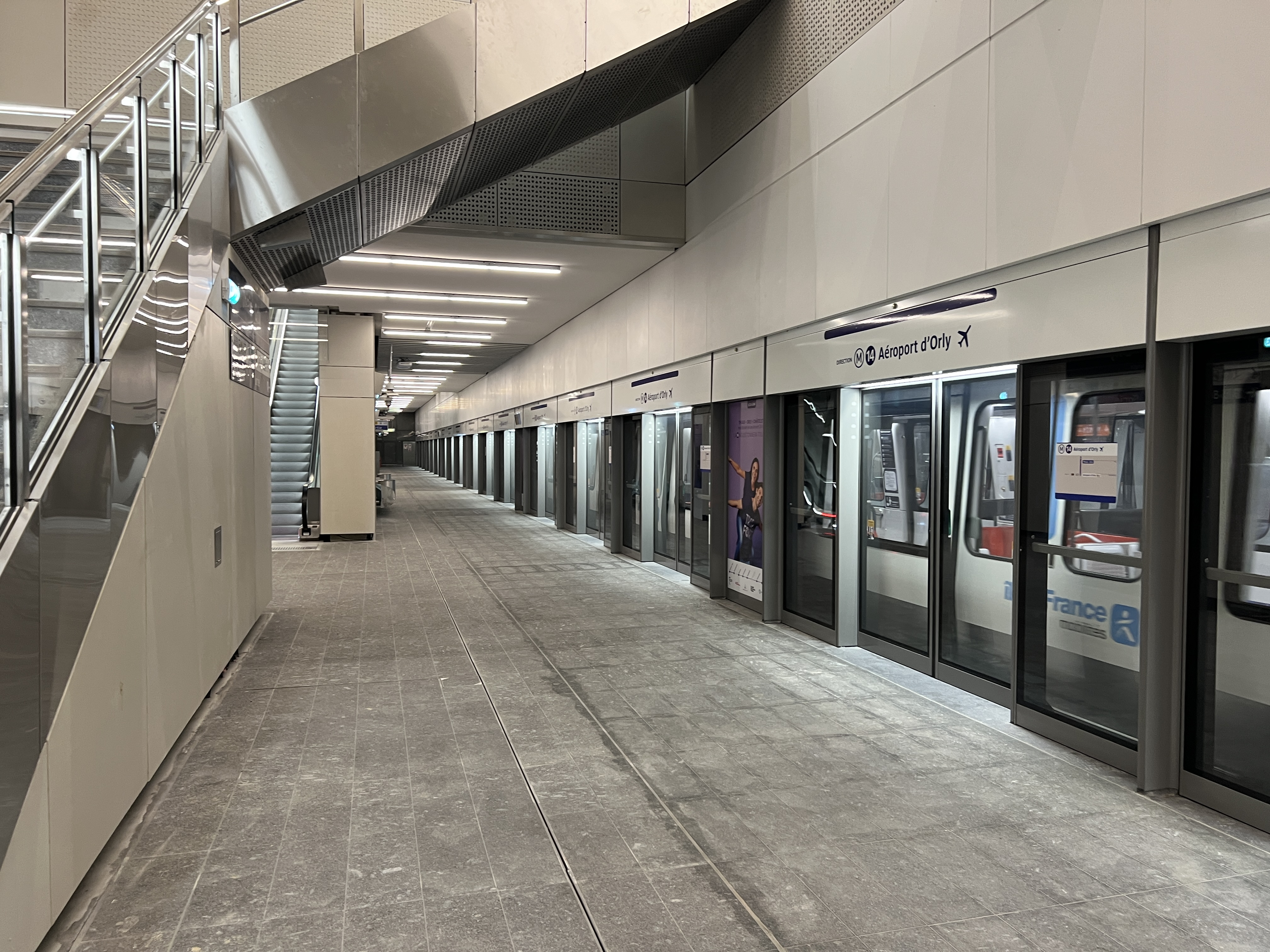
Platforms

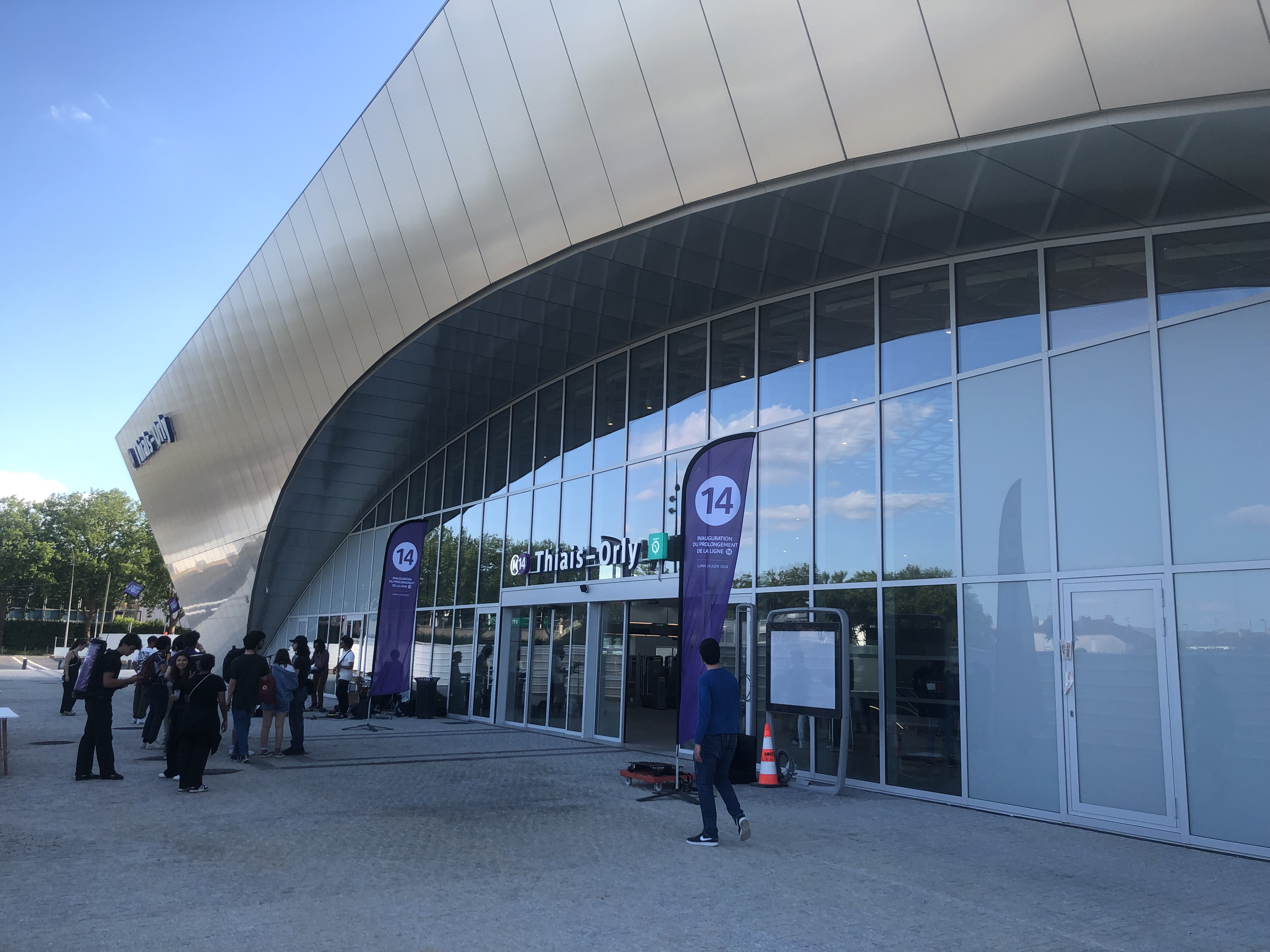
Access 1

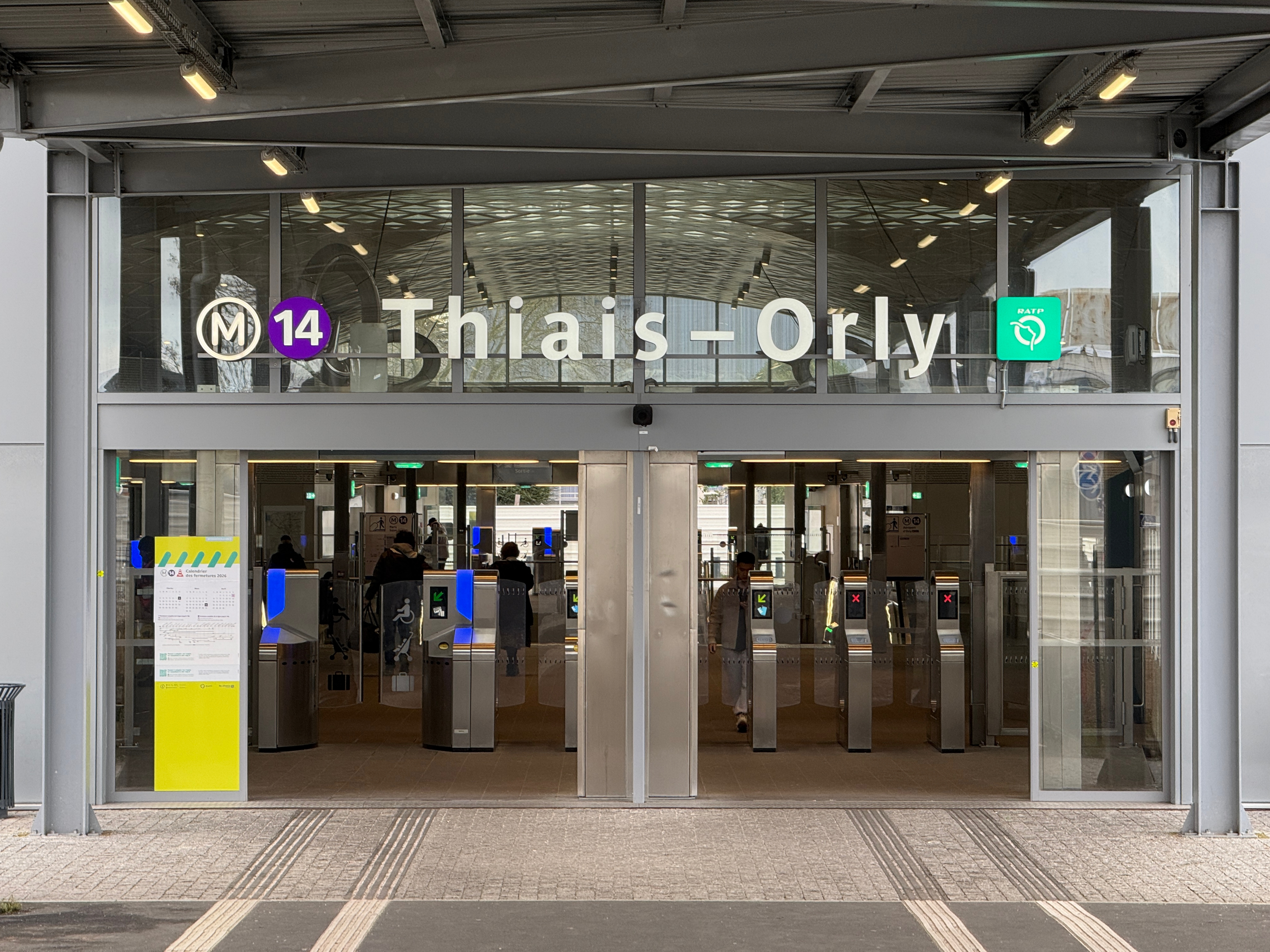
Access 2

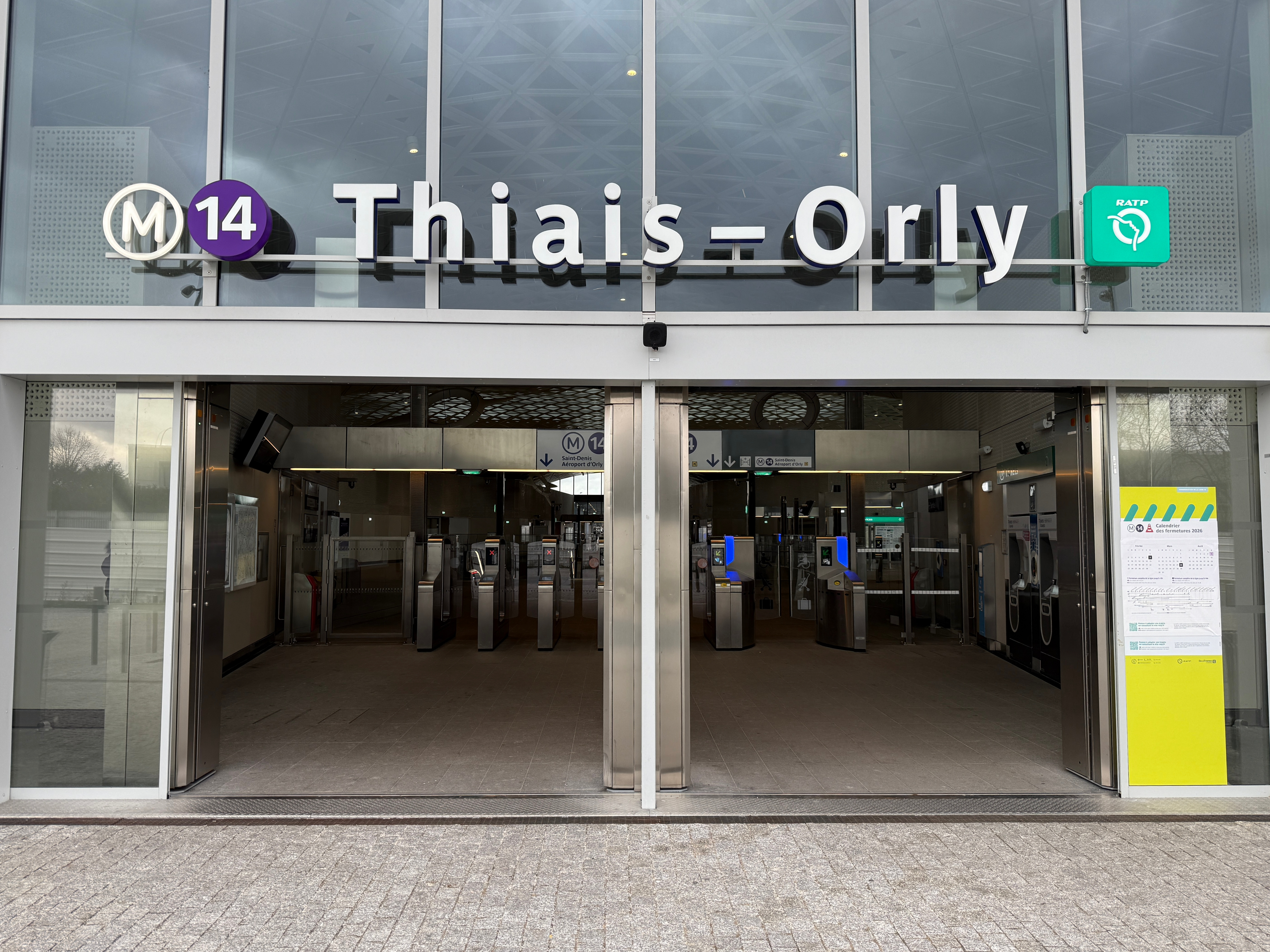
Access 3

== Nearby ==
- Stadium Thiais Orly
