= Lycée Georges Brassens =

Lycée Georges Brassens may refer to:

- Lycée Georges Brassens (Paris)
- Lycée Georges Brassens (Courcouronnes) (Paris metropolitan area)
- Lycée Georges Brassens (Neufchatel-en-Bray) - Neufchatel-en-Bray (Normandy)
- Lycée Georges Brassens (Rive-de-Gier) - Rive-de-Gier (Loire)
- Lycée Georges Brassens (Réunion) - Sainte-Clotilde, Réunion
- Lycée Georges Brassens (Villeneuve-le-Roi) - Villeneuve-le-Roi (Paris metropolitan area)
- Lycée Georges Brassens (Villepinte) - Villepinte, Seine-Saint-Denis (Paris metropolitan area)
