= Chevilly-Larue station =

Paris Metro station in Chevilly-Larue

Chevilly-Larue Marché International
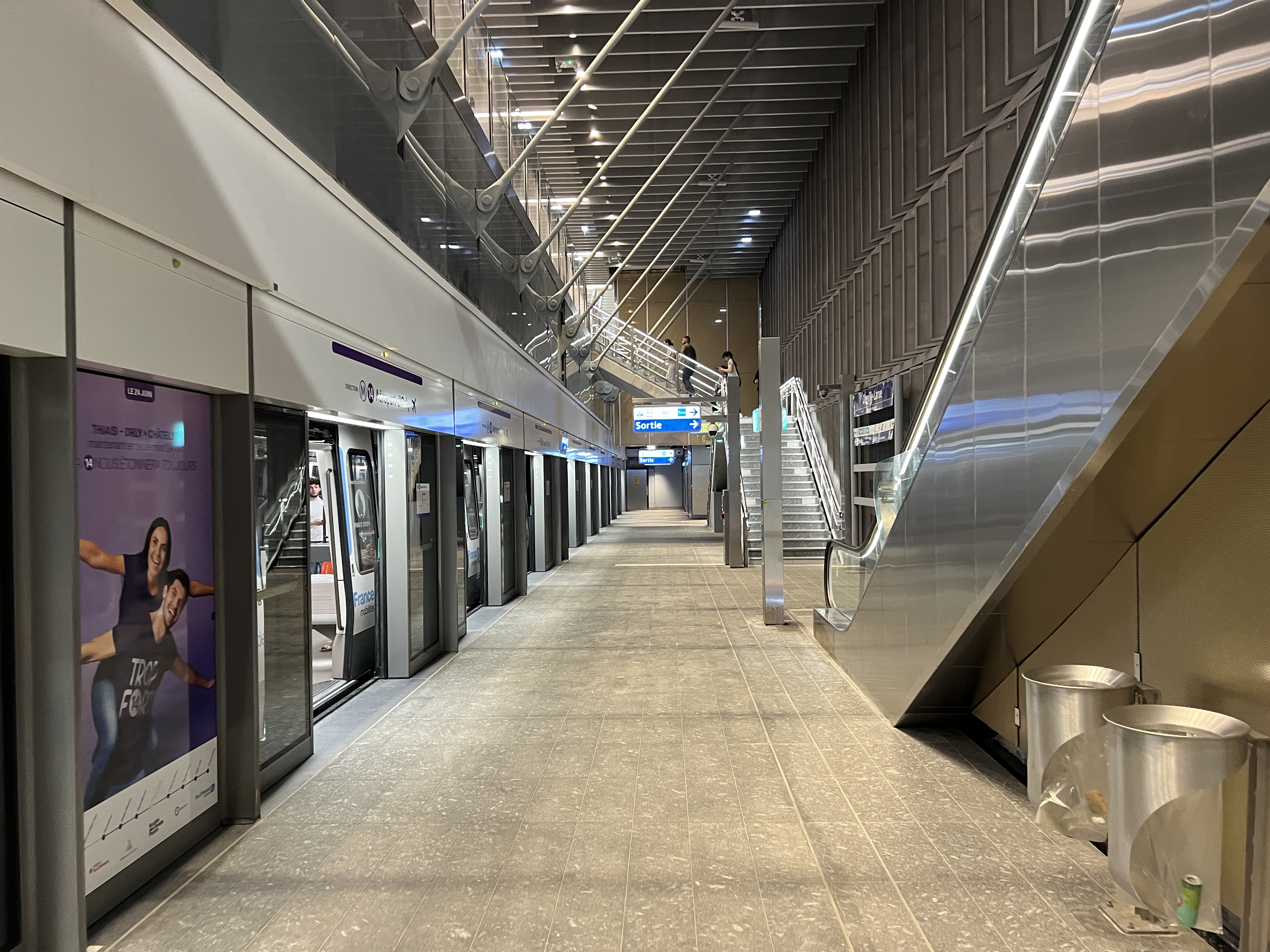
- Southbound platform two days after opening

General information
- Location: Chevilly-Larue; France
- Coordinates: 48°45′30″N 2°22′00″E
- Owner: Société du Grand Paris
- Operator: RATP Group
- Platforms: 2 side platforms
- Tracks: 2
- Connections: at Porte de Thiais; Tvm

Construction
- Structure type: Underground
- Accessible: Yes
- Architect: Jérôme Brunet

Other information
- Station code: GA44 / 44PDT
- Fare zone: 3

History
- Opened: 24 June 2024

Services
Preceding station	Paris Metro	Following station
L'Haÿ-les-Roses towards Saint-Denis–Pleyel	Line 14	Thiais–Orly towards Aéroport d'Orly
Location

Chevilly-Larue (French pronunciation: [ʃəviji laʁy]) is an underground station on Line 14 of the Paris Metro. It is part of the Grand Paris Express project. The station is located in the town of Chevilly-Larue, near the Rungis International Market (Marché International). The station is located beneath Avenue de la Cité and Rue de Thiais with entrances on both sides and offers connections to Île-de-France tramway Line 7, the Trans-Val-de-Marne (Tvm) bus rapid transit line, and local bus routes. It opened on 24 June 2024 as part of the southern extension of Line 14 from Olympiades to Aéroport d'Orly.

== History ==
Following a competitive bidding process in March 2018, a consortium led by Razel-Bec (a Fayat Group company) was awarded the contract for the station's civil engineering works. This comprehensive project encompassed the construction of molded walls, earthworks, and essential infrastructure. Since July 2021, Razel-Bec has spearheaded the development phase, which includes the superstructure (including surface buildings) and major interior works. The Brunet Saunier Architecture firm won the contract to design the station. Swiss artists Gerda Steiner and Jurg Lenzlinger, collaborating with architect Jérôme Brunet, created unique artwork for the station.

The station was initially designated Porte de Thiais, consistent with existing bus and tram stops. Several mayors in Val-de-Marne disagreed with the chosen names for three stations, including this one, arguing they didn't reflect their actual locations. In September 2022, the station was officially renamed Chevilly-Larue, with Marché International remaining as a subtitle.

== Passenger services ==
=== Access ===
The station is composed of two buildings, the main one located along the Rue des Routiers has entrances 1 and 2 while the secondary building located near the Chevilly-Larue tramway station has entrance 3:

- access 1 Rue Latérale located on the east façade of the main building along Rue Latérale;
- access 2 Rue des Routiers located on the west façade of the main building;
- access 3 Rue du Languedoc located on the west façade of the secondary building facing the Porte de Thiais of the Rungis International Market.

=== Platforms ===
The station is standard for line 14. Two 120m long platforms with automatic and platform screen doors, characteristic of the new stations of the southern extension of the line, to be in accordance with the new architectural standards of the Société des Grands Projets stations. A particularity of this station is that the platforms are topped by a mezzanine, serving as a "ceiling".

=== Other connections ===
The station connects to the T7 tram line. The latter, previously named Porte de Thiais - Marché International, was renamed Chevilly-Larue - Marché International on the occasion of the extension of line 14. The station also connects to the Trans-Val-de-Marne (TVM) bus (which connects the Saint-Maur - Créteil station to the Croix de Berny station), by lines 183, 192, 216, 319 and 396 of the RATP bus network, by line 9112 of the Évry Centre Essonne bus network and, at night, by lines N22 N31 and N71 and the Noctilien bus network.
