= Seine Grand Orly bus network =

Seine Grand Orly
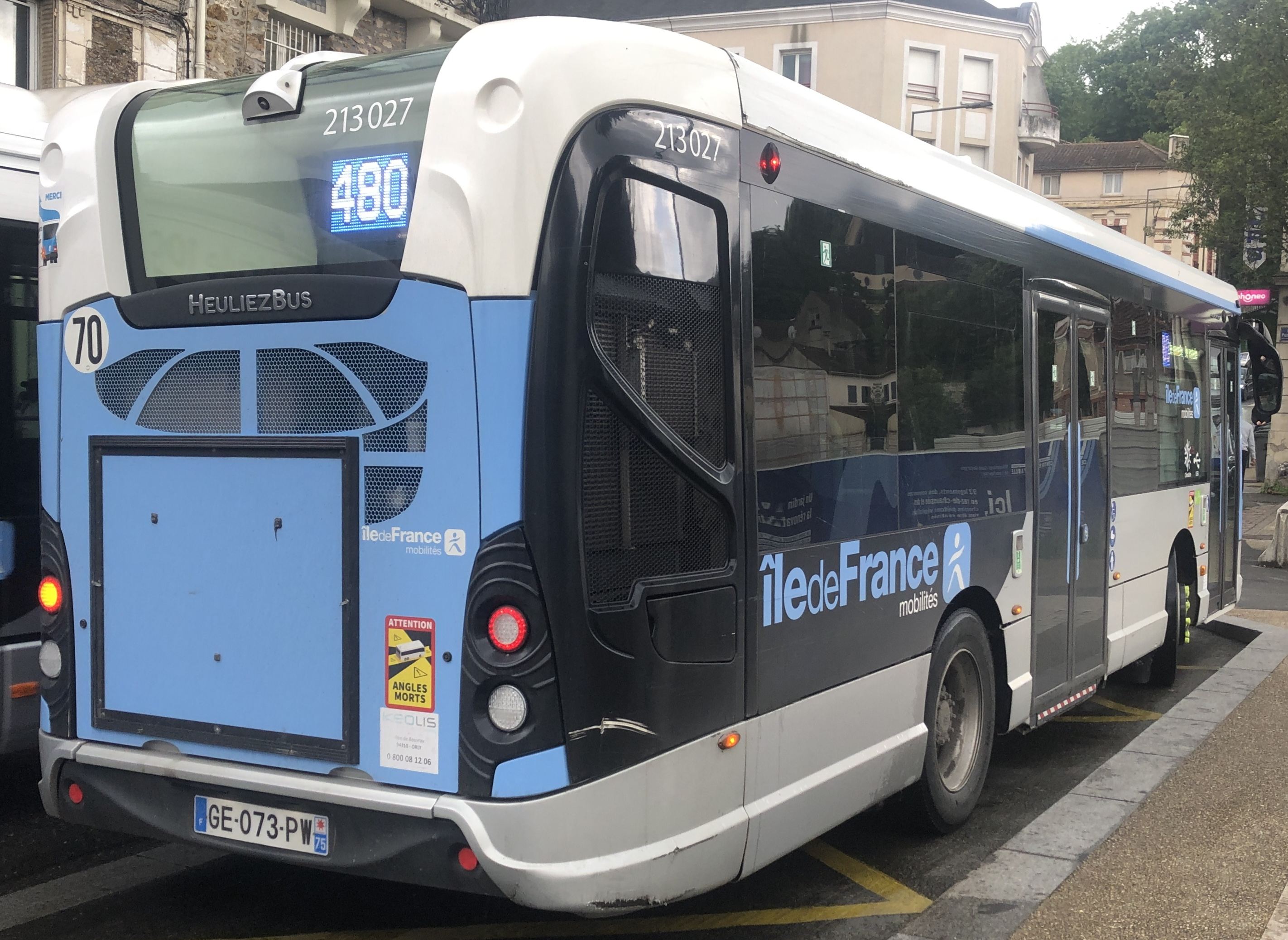
- Heuliez GX 137 n°213027 near Villeneuve-Saint-Georges station
- Parent: Île-de-France Mobilités
- Founded: January 1, 2021
- Service area: Val de Marne: (Ablon-sur-Seine, Athis-Mons, Choisy-le-Roi, Orly, Thiais, Villeneuve-le-Roi, Villeneuve-Saint-Georges, Vitry-sur-Seine); Essonne: (Paray-Vieille-Poste)
- Routes: Buses lines: 282 480 482 483 Licorne; Tramway:
- Operator: Keolis (Keolis Ouest Val-de-Marne)
- Website: Official website

Seine Grand Orly is a French bus network run by Île-de-France Mobilités, operated by Keolis via his subsidiary Keolis Ouest Val-de-Marne from January 1, 2021.

The network consists of five lines and Île-de-France tramway Line 9 which mainly serve the catchment area of Grand-Orly Seine Bièvre.

== History ==
=== Network development ===
In May 2018, Île-de-France Mobilités published a concession notice of Bord de l'Eau bus network including also Île-de-France tramway Line 9, by calling on potential candidates to come forward. Ultimately, four potential operating companies were qualified by the organizing authority to compete, in the following categories: RATP Dev, Keolis, Transdev and Moventia. (Note: Moventa, spanish operator, was the unexpected company of this selection)

=== First opening to the competition ===
Due to the opening up of public transport to competition in Île-de-France, the Bord de l'eau bus network became Seine Grand Orly on January 1, 2021, corresponding to public service delegation number 22 established by Île-de-France Mobilités. An invitation to tender was therefore launched by the organizing authority in order to designate a company which will succeed the operation of Keolis Seine Val-de-Marne for a period of five and a half years. It is finally Keolis, via its subsidiary Keolis Ouest Val-de-Marne, which was designated during the board of directions of June 14, 2019. When it was opened to competition, the network consisted of lines 2, 3, 8, 9, 10 and Licorne.

==== Opening of service of Tramway Line 9 ====
In order to support the opening of service of Île-de-France tramway Line 9, The five lines of the Seine Grand Orly bus network were reorganized on April 12, 2021. All the lines (except Licorne) were renumbered. In addition, the line 482 extended its service to the north as far as the shopping center, Belle Épine via Pont de Rungis railway station, and the line 10 which ran Juvisy station to Athis Plaine Basse was folded and a partial portion was transferred to Express 191.100.

This next table shows the renaming of the bus network between old and new number lines.

Network renaming
| Old | New |
|---|---|
| 9 | 282 |
| 8 | 480 |
| 2 | 482 |
| 3 | 483 |
| Licorne | Unchanged |
| 10 | Ceased to exist |

=== Second opening to the competition ===
Starting on August 1, 2026, the network will be renamed Seine Orly and completed with lines 25, 27, 47, 62, 83, 89, 91, 125, 132, 162, 172, 180, 182, 323, 325, 380 and Noctilien lines N14, N15, N21, N22, N23, N24 and N31 from RATP. This network will still be operated by Keolis, corresponding to public service delegation number 47 established by Île-de-France Mobilités. It's also schedulded that a new line 386 and T Zen Line 5 will be created.

== Routes ==
| Image | Line | First direction | Second direction |
|---|---|---|---|
| | 282 | Vitry-sur-Seine — Centre Commercial — Pont de Vitry | Thiais — E. Levasseur |
| | 480 | Orly 1, 2, 3 | Gare de Villeneuve-Saint-Georges |
| | 482 | Thiais — Belle Épine Sud / Mairie d'Orly — Place François Mitterrand | Villeneuve-le-Roi — Place Jeanne d'Arc |
| | 483 | Gare de Choisy-le-Roi | Gare de Villeneuve-Saint-Georges; Athis-Mons — Saint-Charles |
| | Licorne | Villeneuve-le-Roi — Foyer Jean-Rostand (circular line) | |

== Gallery ==
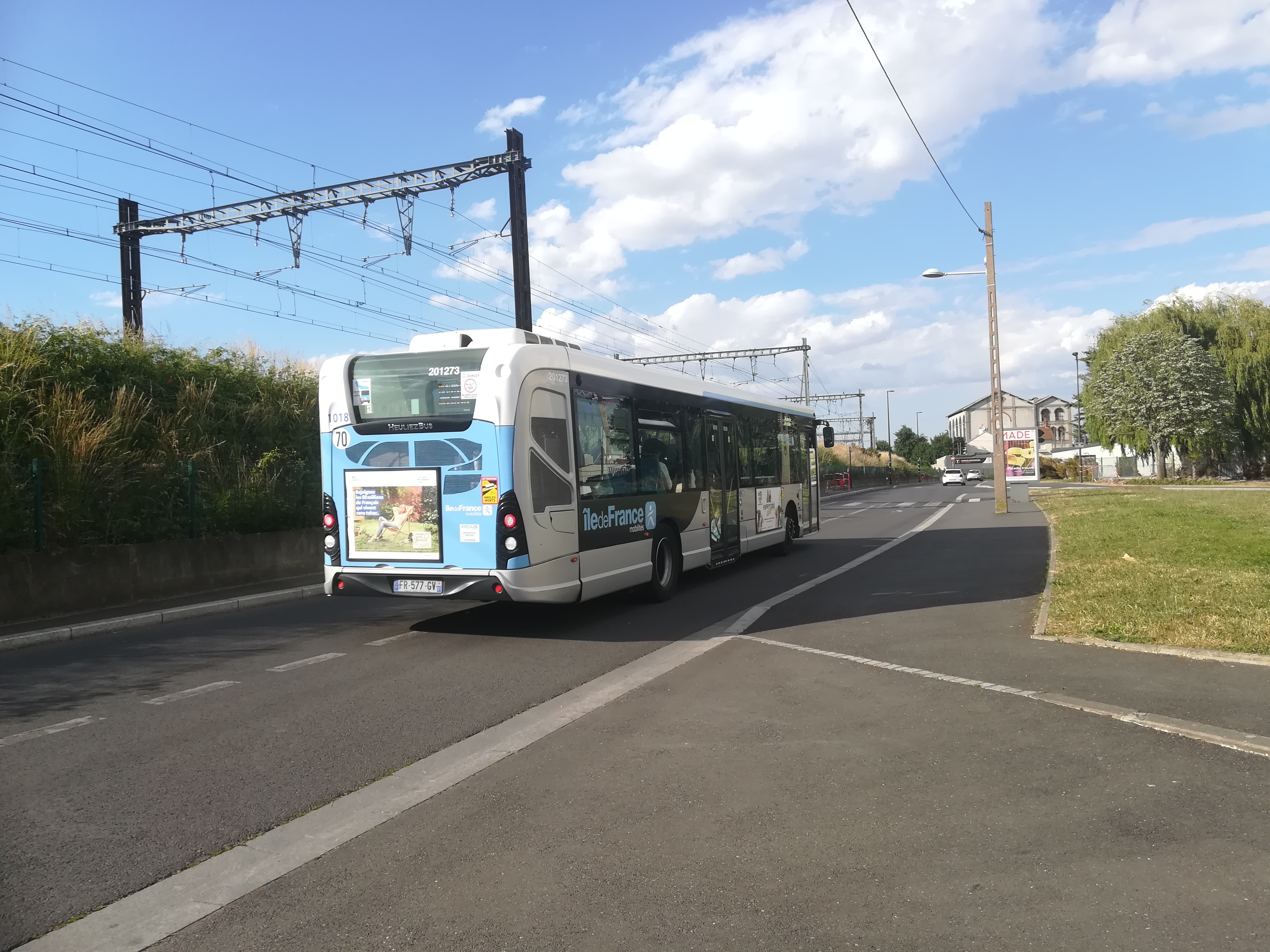
Heuliez Bus GX 337 n°201273 on line 483.

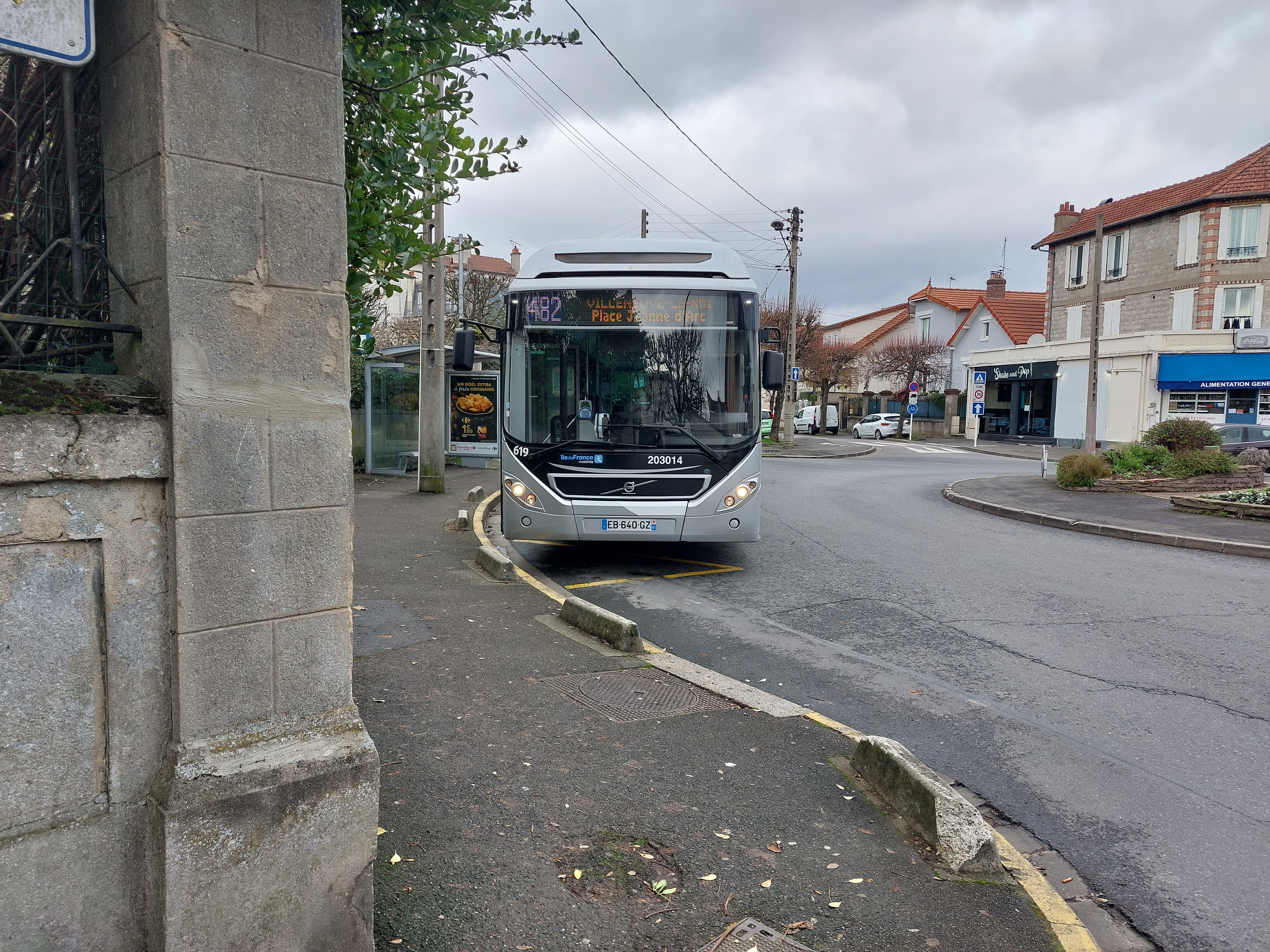
Volvo 7900 L Hybride n°203014 on line 482 at its terminus, Place Jeanne d'Arc.

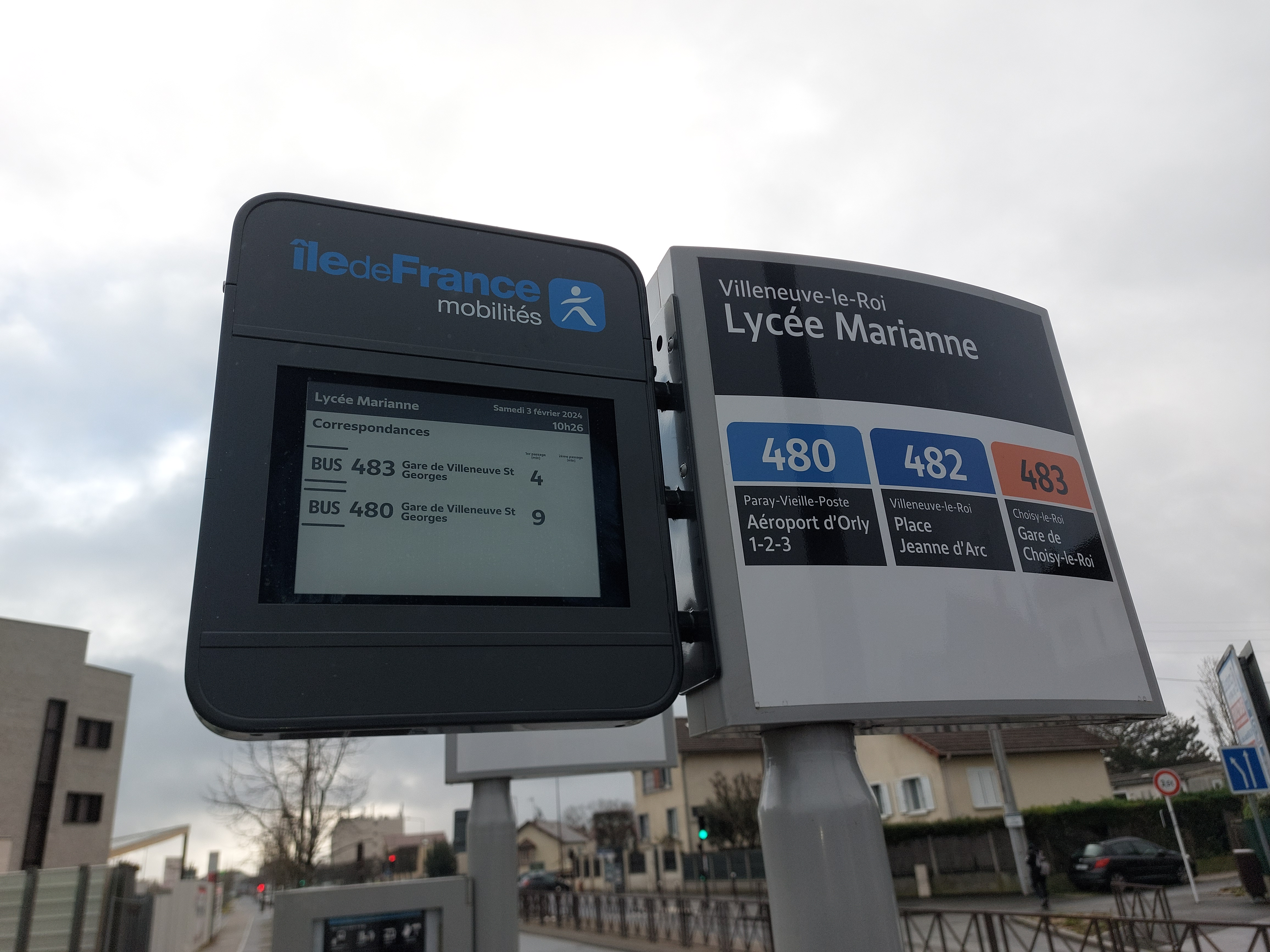
Stop and traveler information sign at Lycée Marianne.

== See also ==
- Île-de-France Mobilités
- Île-de-France tramway Line 9
