= Villeneuve-le-Roi station =

Train station (Paris RER)

Villeneuve le Roi
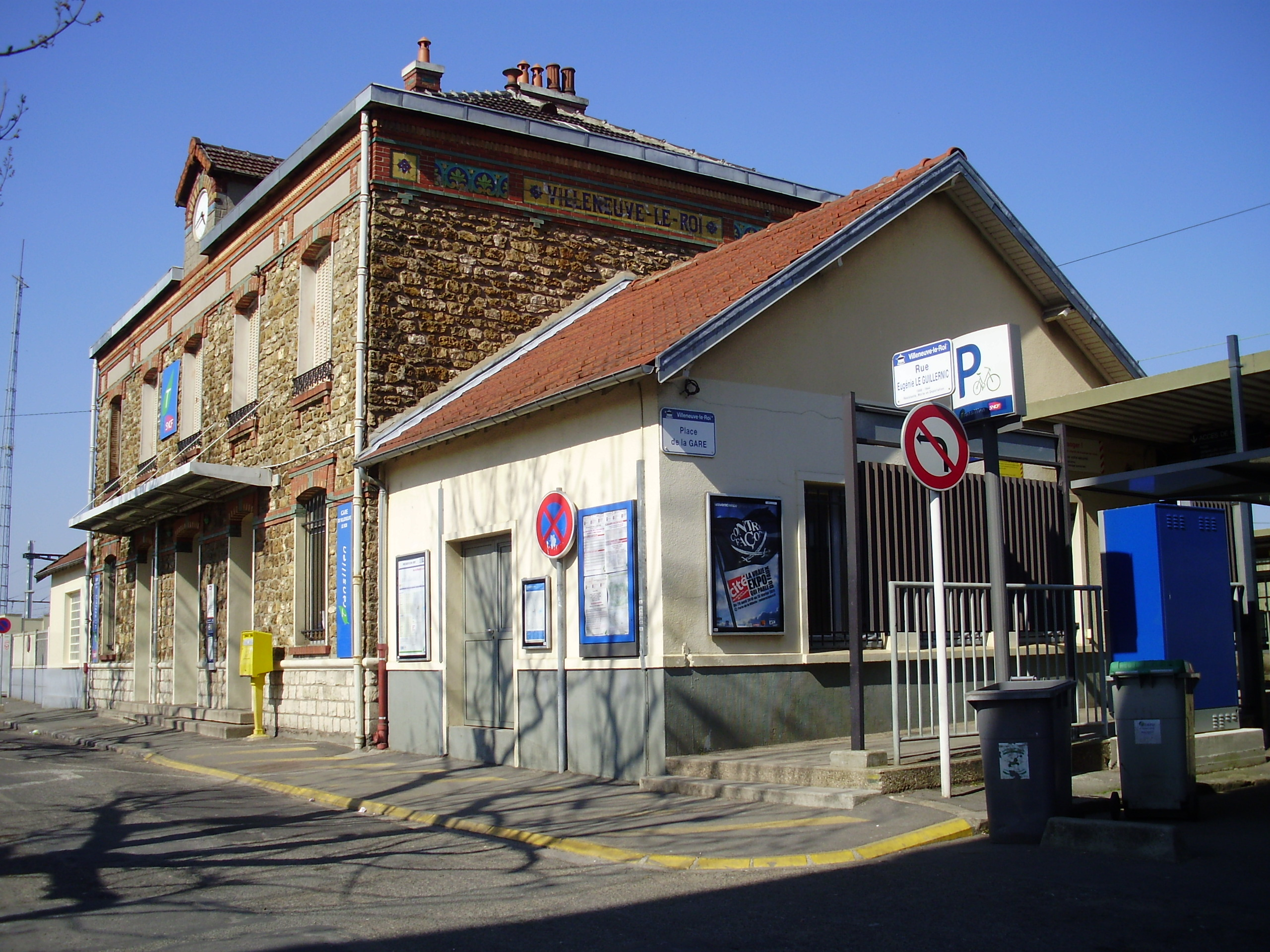
- Villeneuve-le-Roi station

General information
- Location: Villeneuve-le-Roi; France
- Coordinates: 48°44′24″N 2°25′35″E
- Operator: SNCF
- Line: Paris–Bordeaux railway
- Platforms: 2 side platforms
- Tracks: 2 + 2 passing tracks
- Connections: Noctilien: N133; Seine Grand Orly: 482

Construction
- Accessible: Yes, by request to staff

Other information
- Station code: 87545277
- Fare zone: 4

History
- Opened: 29 March 1914

Passengers
- 2024: 1,527,961

Services
Preceding station	RER	Following station
Choisy-le-Roi towards Versailles Château Rive Gauche	RER C	Ablon towards Juvisy
Location

Villeneuve-le-Roi station (French: Gare de Villeneuve-le-Roi) is a railway station in Villeneuve-le-Roi, Val-de-Marne, Île-de-France, France. The station was opened on 29 May 1914 and is on the Paris–Bordeaux railway. The station is served by the RER Line C, which is operated by SNCF. The station serves the commune of Villeneuve-le-Roi.

== Station info ==
Built at an altitude at 39 meters above sea level, the station is on the 12.405 kilometer point of the Paris–Bordeaux railway, between the stations of Choisy-le-Roi and Ablon. The station served 1,490,400 passengers in 2014.

== Train services ==
The following services serve the station:

- Local services (RER C) Juvisy – Villeneuve-le-Roi – Bibliothèque François Mitterrand – Invalides – Champs-de-Mars Tour Eiffel – Viroflay-Rive-Gauche – Versailles Château Rive Gauche
- Local services (RER C) Versailles-Chantiers – Massy-Palaiseau – Juvisy – Villeneuve-le-Roi – Invalides – Champs-de-Mars Tour Eiffel – Viroflay-Rive-Gauche – Versailles Château Rive Gauche
