= Orly-Ville station =

Railway station in Orly, France

Coordinates: 48°44′31″N 2°24′11″E

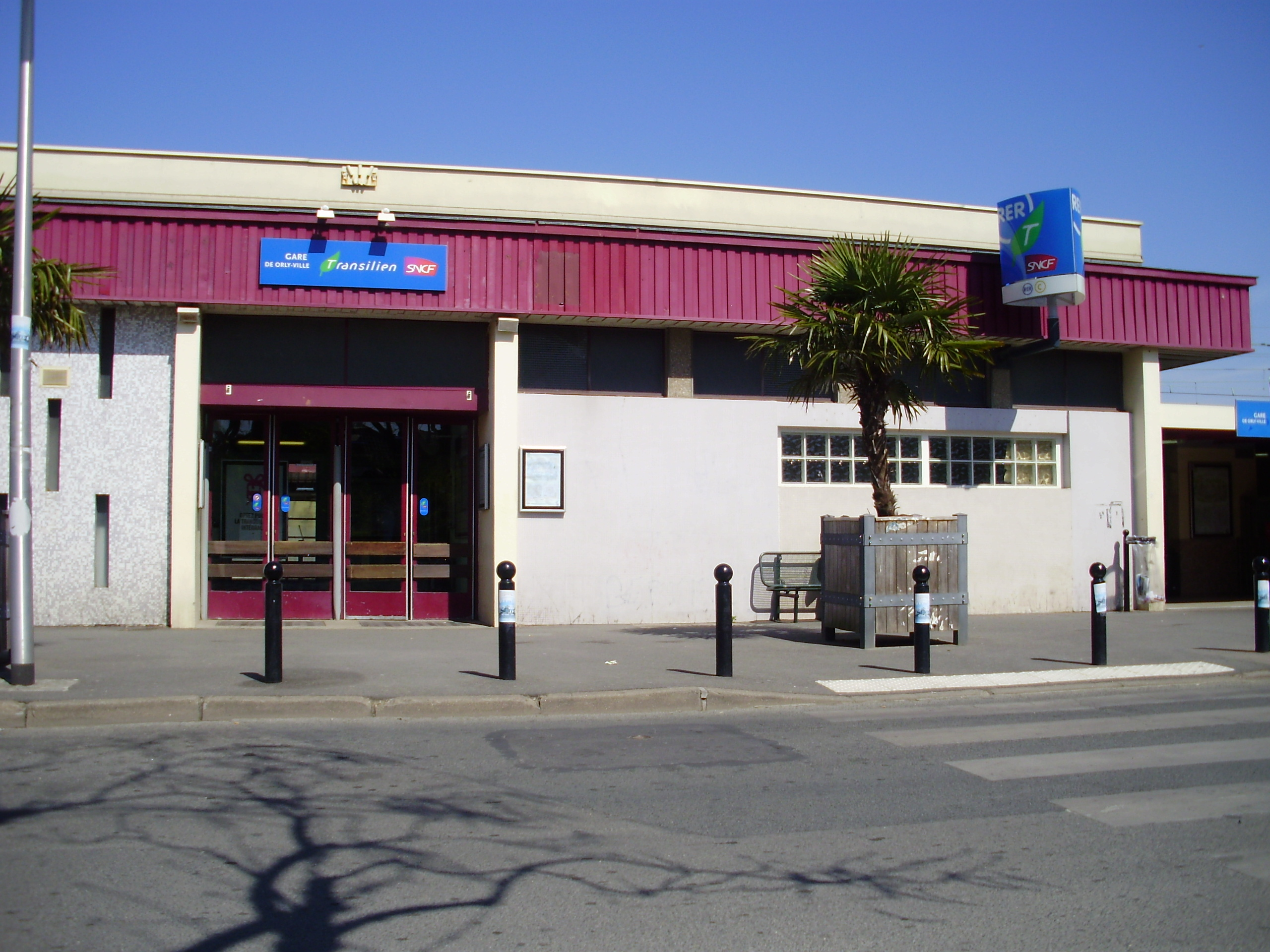
Entrance

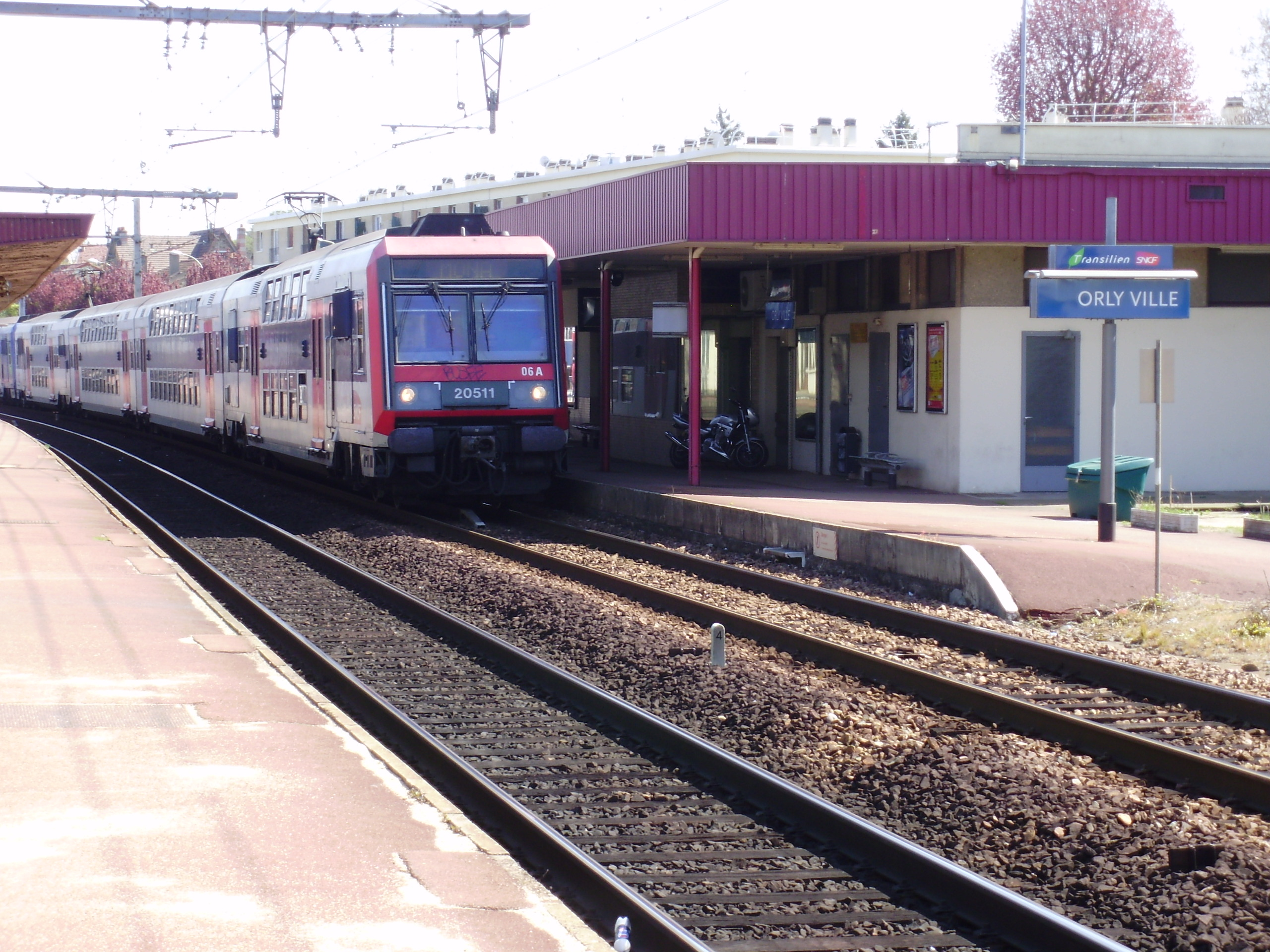
Platforms

Orly Ville is a train station served by RER C, part of the Paris express suburban rail system. It serves the commune of Orly, in the Val-de-Marne department.

== Railway situation ==
Orly Ville station is located at kilometre point (KP) 13.354 on the Choisy-le-Roi–Massy-Verrières railway, between Les Saules station and Pont de Rungis–Aéroport d'Orly station.

== See also ==
- List of stations of the Paris RER

Preceding station	RER	Following station
Les Saules towards Pontoise, Versailles Château Rive Gauche or Saint-Quentin-en-Yvelines	RER C	Pont de Rungis–Aéroport d'Orly towards Massy-Palaiseau
