= Île-de-France tramway Line 9 =

Tram line in Paris and Val-de-Marne

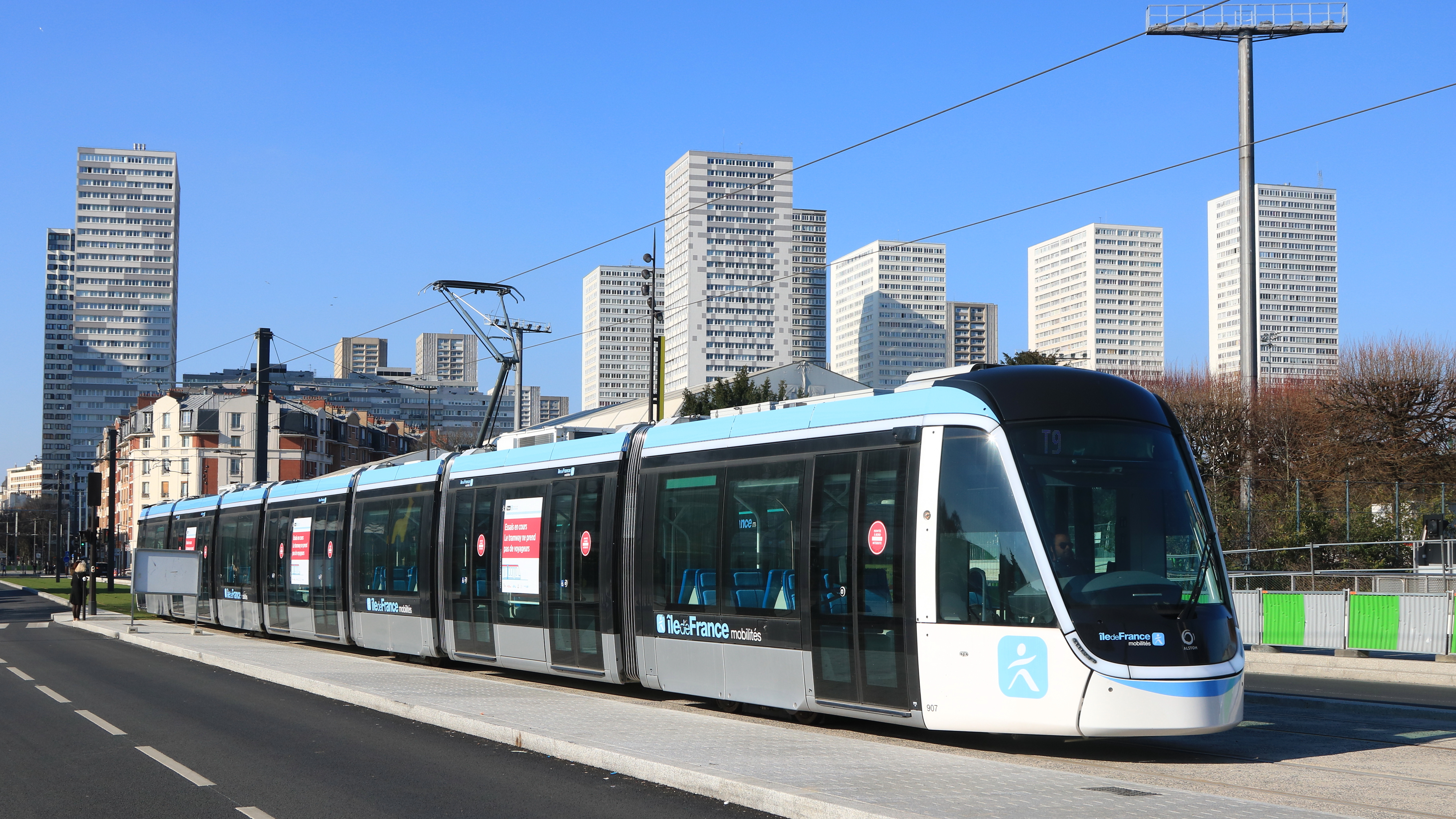
- Île-de-France tramway Line 9 at the Porte de Choisy terminal

Overview
- Owner: Île-de-France Mobilités
- Termini: Porte de Choisy; Orly–Gaston Viens
- Stations: 19

Service
- Type: Tram
- System: Tramways in Île-de-France
- Operator: Keolis
- Rolling stock: 22 Alstom Citadis

History
- Opened: 10 April 2021; 5 years ago

Technical
- Line length: 10.3 km (6.4 mi)
- Track gauge: 1,435 mm (4 ft 8 1/2 in) standard gauge
Route map

Île-de-France tramway Line 9 (usually called simply T9 and formerly known as Tramway Porte de Choisy – Orly Ville or TPO) is a tram line which is a part of the modern tramway network of the Île-de-France region of France. Line 9 connects Porte de Choisy Paris Métro station and the centre of Orly (Place Gaston Viens) serving suburbs in the south-east of Paris. Line 9 does not serve Orly Airport, which is currently served by tramway Line 7. The line has a length of 10.3 km (6.4 mi) and 19 stations. The line opened to the public on 10 April 2021.

The line is operated by the Keolis under contract with Île-de-France Mobilités.

== Project objectives ==
The main goal of the project was to desaturate existing transit lines, and in particular RATP bus route 183 (Porte de Choisy-Aéroport d'Orly Terminal Sud) which became the second busiest bus route in the Île-de-France region after route TVM, and to propose a public transport offer with more capacity, better performance, more regularity and more comfort, thanks to the adoption of a tramway. Additional project objectives were to accompany the evolution and development of a fast-changing suburban environment, the encouragement of sustainable mobility, better links between existing transit infrastructures and the refiguration of roads and public spaces (introduction of bike lines along the tram alignment, more accessible walking paths, etc.).

Tramway Line 9 offers connections to tramway Line T3a and Paris Métro Line 7 at Porte de Choisy station, with RER C at Choisy-le-Roi station, and at Les Saules station, as well as with various bus routes including routes TVM and 393 at Choisy-le-Roi. In the future, the line will be connected with Paris Métro Line 15, part of the Grand Paris Express, at Mairie de Vitry-sur-Seine station.

== Operation ==
=== Contract ===
The line is the Île-de-France tramway network's first line which is not directly awarded for management to either RATP or SNCF. The line's operations and maintenance contract is subject to competitive tendering by Île-de-France Mobilités (IDFM). In May 2018, IDFM issued a concession notice for operations and maintenance of Line 9 including seven bus lines of the local "Bord de l'Eau" bus network for a period of 66 months (i.e. for only 5½ years), calling for potential candidates to submit a request for qualification. IDFM allowed four candidates to bid: RATP Dev, Keolis, Transdev, and outsider Moventia of Spain. On 14 June 2019 IDFM announced Keolis as the preferred bidder for T9 and the "Bord de l'Eau" bus network. The choice of Keolis was confirmed by IDFM on 2 July 2019.
