= Les Saules station =

Railway station in Orly, France

Coordinates: 48°44′44″N 2°25′3″E

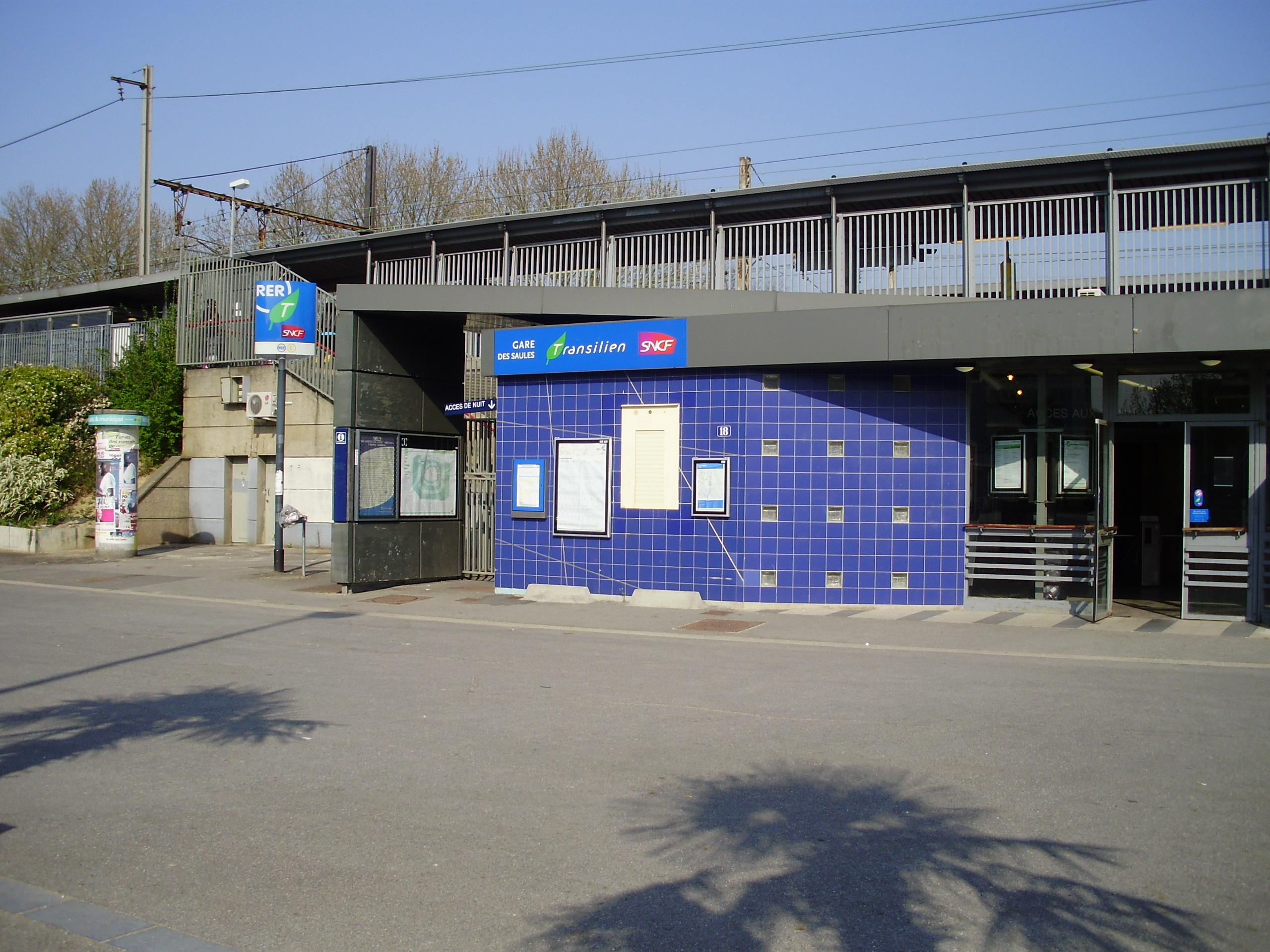
Entrance

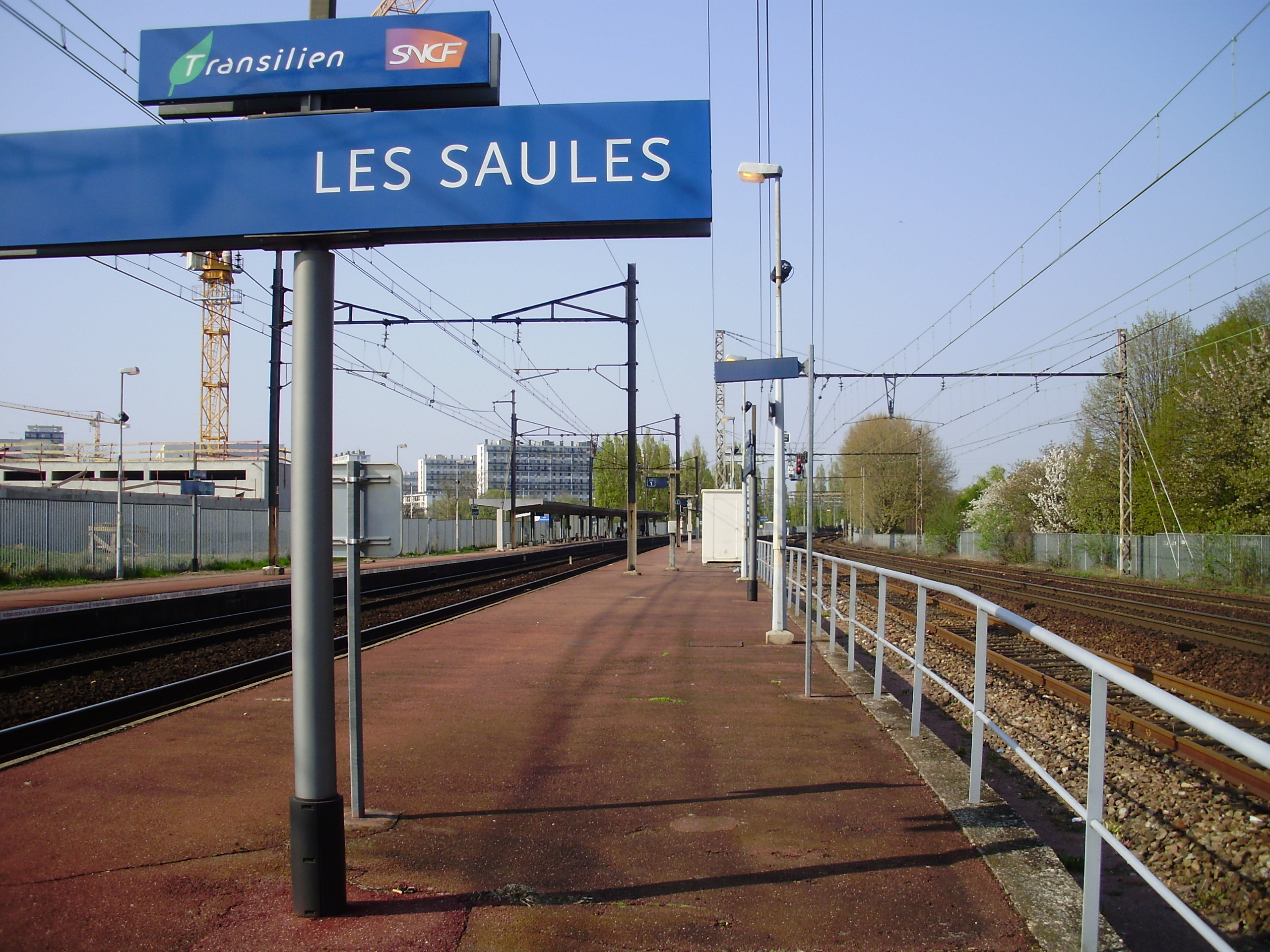
Platforms

Les Saules is a station in Paris's express suburban rail system, the RER. It serves the commune of Orly, in the Val-de-Marne department.

== Location and overview ==
Les Saules is located at point-kilometer PK 11.721 on the Choisy-le-Roi–Massy–Verrières railway line, between Choisy-le-Roi and Orly-Ville stations, at an elevation of approximately 44 m above sea level. It features two passenger platforms beside two mainline tracks, and an additional three passing tracks serving freight and operational traffic.

== History ==
The station was inaugurated in May 1967 by SNCF as part of the extension of the Choisy-le-Roi–Massy line to improve suburban rail access to southern Paris suburbs.

== Facilities ==
Les Saules station includes a staffed ticket counter, ticket vending machines, and real-time departure displays. It offers accessibility features such as ramps and assistance for passengers with reduced mobility.

== Passenger usage ==
In 2022, the station handled approximately 270,000 annual passengers, averaging around 740 validated tickets per day.

== Services and intermodal connections ==
Les Saules is a stop on RER line C, connecting central Paris with its southern suburbs. Since 10 April 2021, the station offers a direct interchange with Tramway Line T9, which replaced bus line 183 and provides a roughly 30-minute link between Porte de Choisy and Orly-Gaston Viens.

== See also ==
- List of stations of the Paris RER
- RER C
- Tramway Line T9

Preceding station	RER	Following station
Choisy-le-Roi towards Pontoise, Versailles Château Rive Gauche or Saint-Quentin-en-Yvelines	RER C	Orly-Ville towards Massy-Palaiseau
