= Pont de Rungis–Aéroport d'Orly station =

Railway station in Thiais, France

Pont de Rungis Aéroport d'Orly
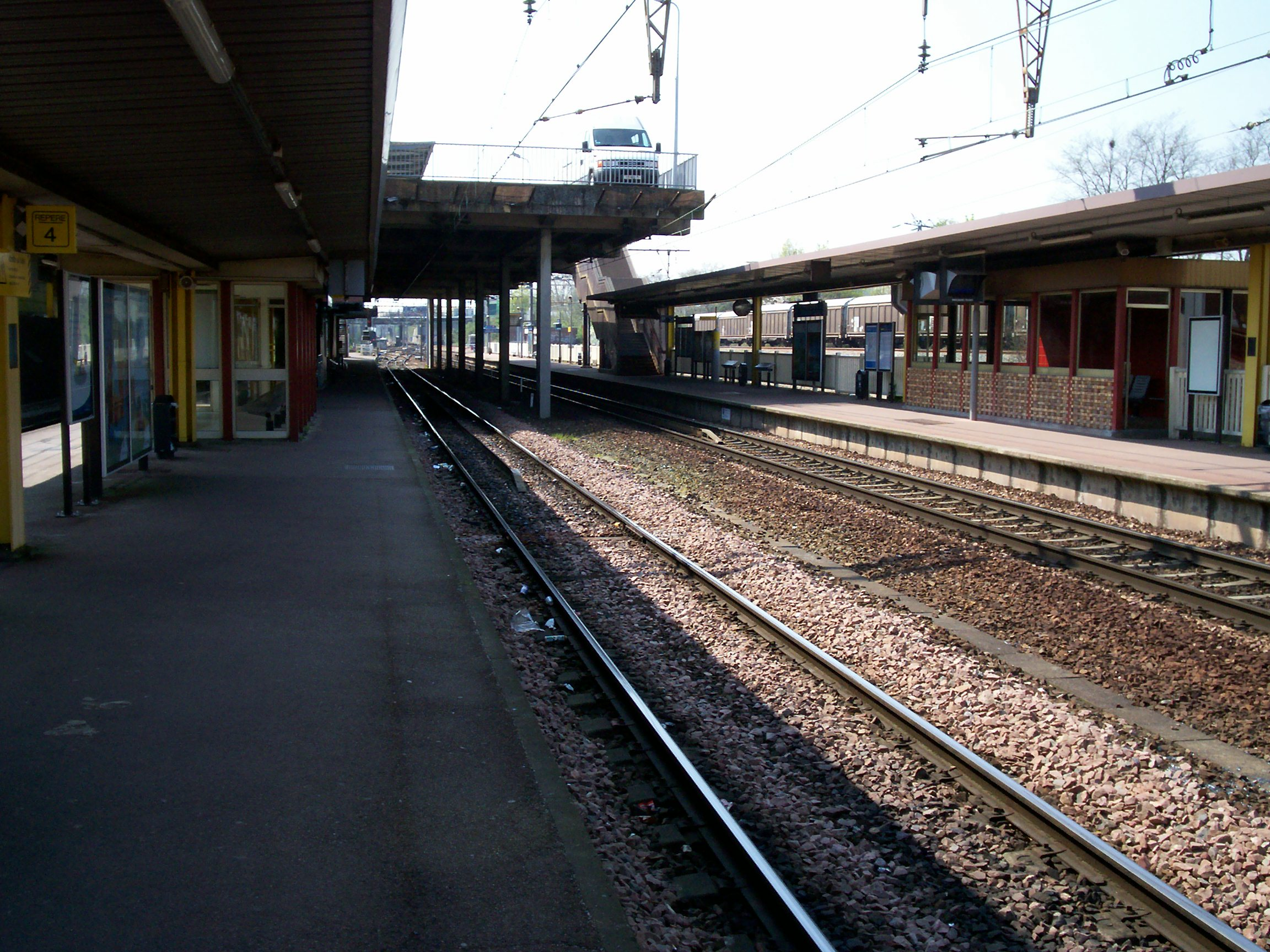
- Pont de Rungis–Aéroport d'Orly station platforms

General information
- Location: Avenue du Docteur-Marie; Thiais; France
- Coordinates: 48°44′53″N 2°22′23″E
- Operator: SNCF
- Platforms: 2
- Tracks: 3
- Connections: RATP Bus: 183 319 382 396; Seine Grand Orly: 482; Noctilien: N22 N31

Construction
- Accessible: No

Other information
- Station code: 87546192
- Fare zone: 4

Services
| Preceding station | RER | Following station |
|---|---|---|
| Orly-Ville towards Pontoise, Versailles Château Rive Gauche or Saint-Quentin-en-Yvelines | RER C | Rungis–La Fraternelle towards Massy-Palaiseau |
Location

Pont de Rungis–Aéroport d'Orly is an RER station in Thiais, in the department of Val-de-Marne. The station is served by RER C trains, some of which terminate at the station. It is connected to Thiais–Orly station on Paris Métro Line 14 which provides a connection to Orly Airport.

== Gallery ==
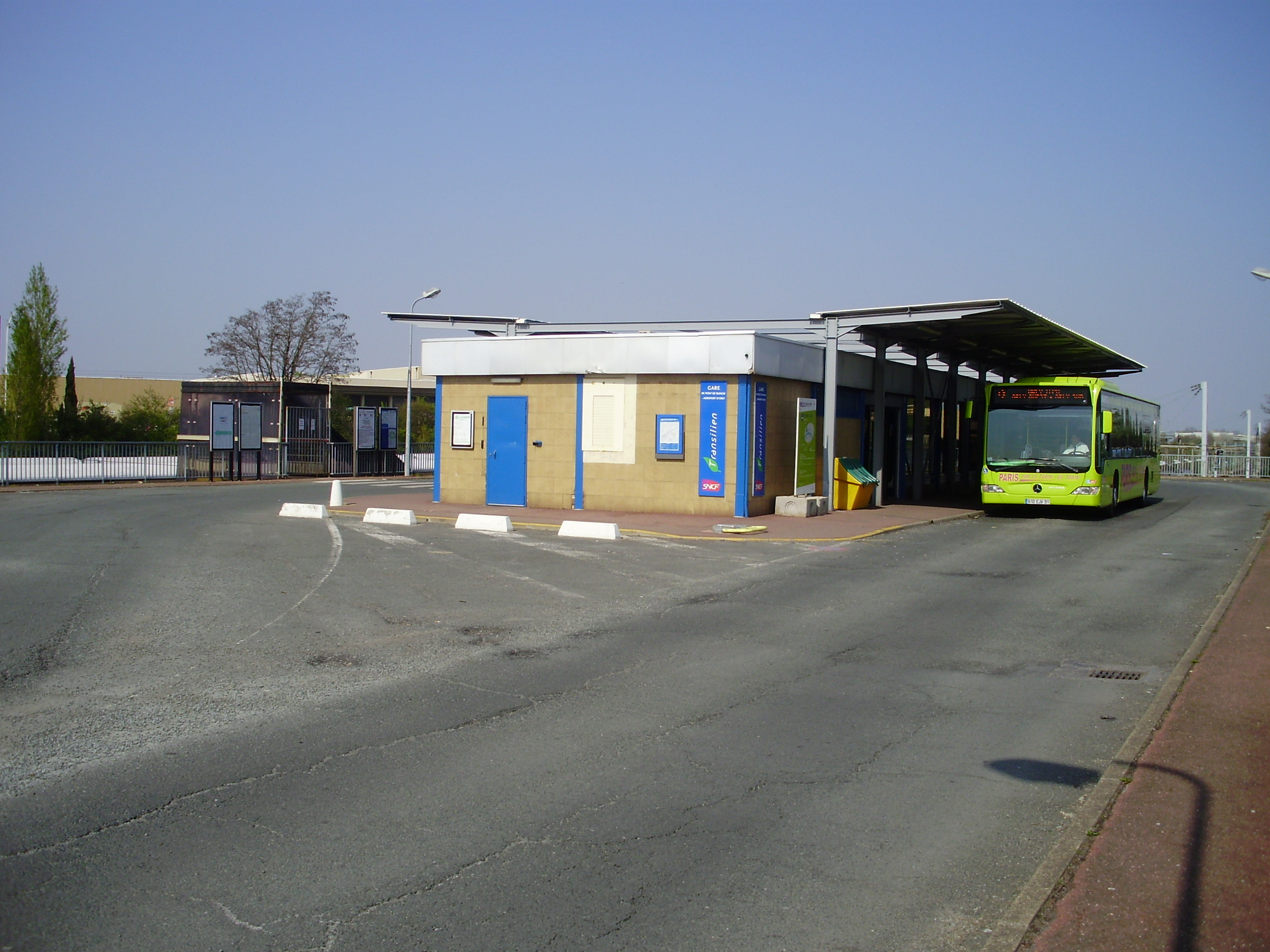
Entrance with a shuttle bus to the airport waiting outside (prior to opening of Line 14 extension)

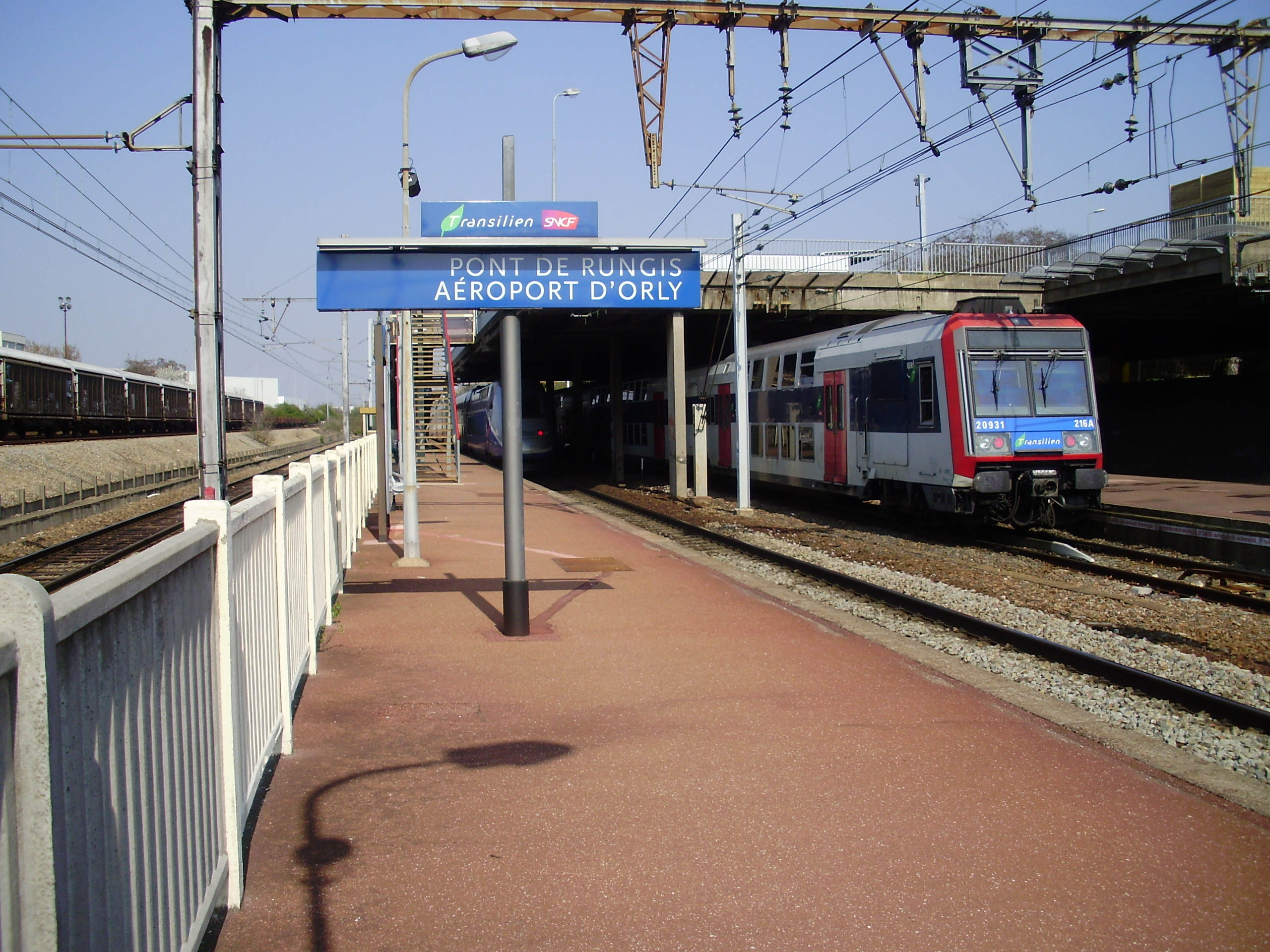
Platforms

== See also ==
- List of stations of the Paris RER
