= Hôtel de Ville, Villeneuve-le-Roi =

Town hall in Villeneuve-le-Roi, France

Hôtel de Ville
- The main frontage of the Hôtel de Ville in September 2009

General information
- Type: City hall
- Architectural style: Louis XIII style
- Location: Villeneuve-le-Roi, France
- Coordinates: 48.7352°N 2.4077°E
- Completed: 1860

The Hôtel de Ville (French pronunciation: [otɛl də vil], City Hall) is a municipal building in Villeneuve-le-Roi, Val-de-Marne, in the southern suburbs of Paris, standing on Place de la Vieille Église. It has been included on the Inventaire général des monuments by the French Ministry of Culture since 1991.

== History ==
The first town hall

The second town hall

=== Early town halls ===
Following the French Revolution, the new town council initially established a municipal office in a building on the east side of Rue Saint-Martin opposite the Church of Saint-Pierre and Saint-Paul.

In the mid-1860s, the council led by the mayor, Charles Noel, decided to establish a purpose-built town hall. The site they selected was on the west side of what is now Rue de Rue du Maréchal Foch. The new building was designed in the neoclassical style, built in red brick with stone finishings and was completed in 1869.

The design involved a symmetrical main frontage of three bays facing onto the street. The central bay featured a double forestair leading up to a segmental headed doorway. There was a segmental headed window on the first floor. The central bay was flanked by banded pilasters supporting an open segmental pediment containing a clock. The outer bays were fenestrated in a similar style. Single-storey wings of three bays each, accommodating a girls' school in the left-hand wing and a boys' school in the right-hand wing, were built in rubble masonry and completed in 1883. After the building was no longer required for municipal use, it operated exclusively as a school until 1957, when the pupils moved to the École Jean-Moulin on Avenue de la République. The central section subsequently served as a police station, while the wings were used to accommodate the early childhood service. An extensive programme of works to refurbish the complex was completed in 2025.

=== The current building ===
In the early 1920s, the council led by the mayor, Adrien Billault, decided to acquire a more substantial building for municipal use. The building they selected was the Château Leblanc-Barbedienne on the west side of Place de la Vieille Église. The building had been commissioned by the former mayor, Charles Noel, as his private residence, on the site of a former Carthusians abbey dating back to the 12th century. The house had been designed in the Louis XIII style, built in red brick with stone finishings and had been completed in around 1860.

The design involved a symmetrical main frontage of seven bays facing south onto a small square with the end bays slightly projected forward as pavilions. The central bay featured a short flight of steps leading up to a doorway. There was a casement window on the first floor. The central bay was flanked by banded pilasters supporting a triangular pediment with a coat of arms in the tympanum. The other bays were fenestrated in a similar style.

Originally known as "Château de l'Abbaye", the building became known as "Château Leblanc Barbedienne" after it was acquired by the industrialist, Gustave Leblanc-Barbedienne, in 1892. Leblanc-Barbedienne owned a foundry which specialized in monumental bronze statues typically used for war memorials. The château was acquired by the council in 1925.

On 19 August 1944, during the Second World War, after most of the occupying German troops had abandoned the town, elements of the French Resistance looted the former German command post. Three days later, the German authorities returned and ordered all council staff, including the deputy mayor, Henri Gilbert, out of the town hall. They then shot Gilbert for his role in leading the looting.

On the night of 28 June 2023, during the Nahel Merzouk riots, the town hall was attacked by a group of individuals who broke the windows and threw Molotov cocktails into the building, which was badly damaged in the ensuing fire.
