= L'Haÿ-les-Roses station =

Paris Metro station in L'Haÿ-les-Roses

L'Haÿ-les-Roses
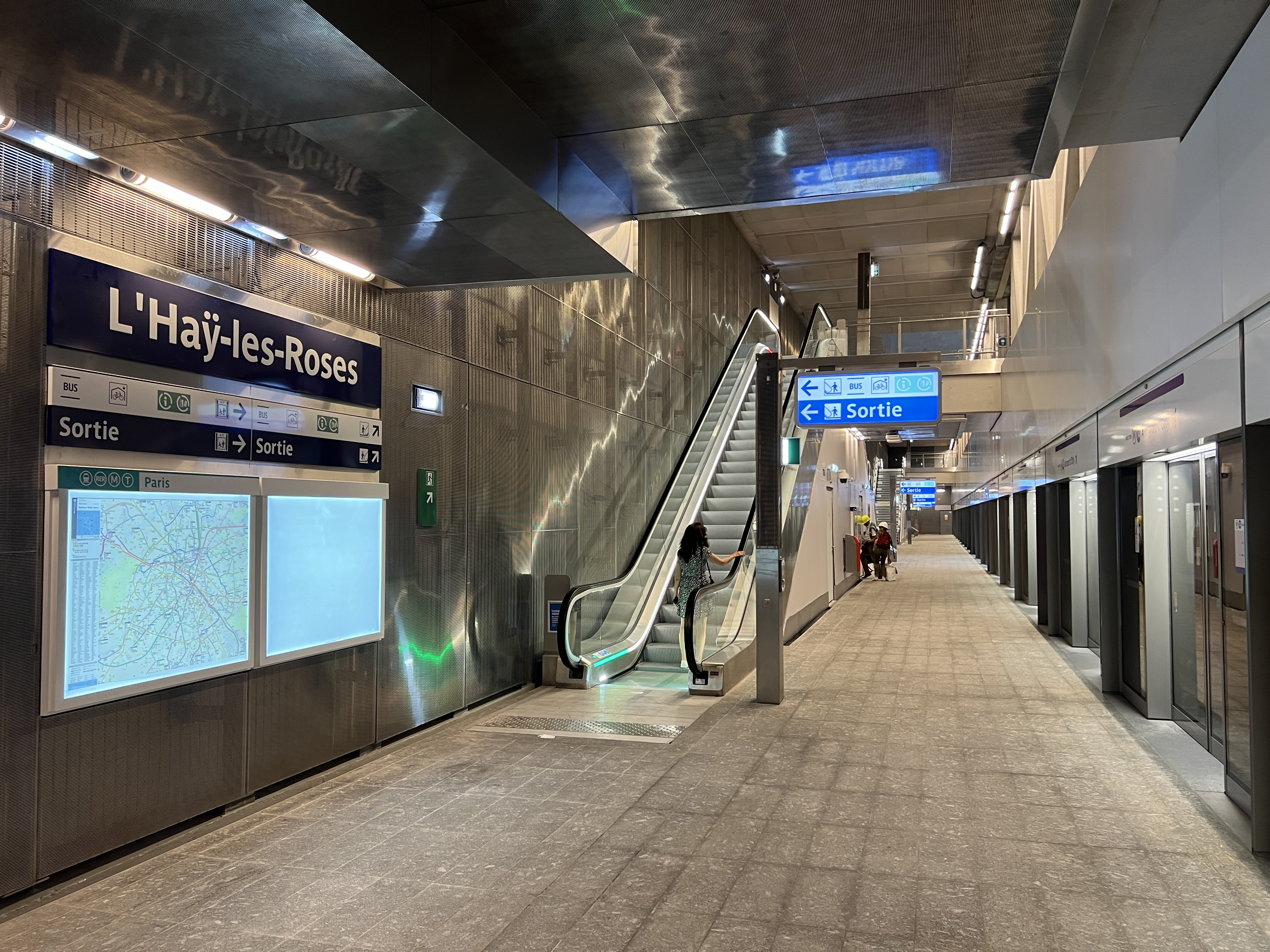
- Southbound platform two days after opening

General information
- Location: L'Haÿ-les-Roses; France
- Coordinates: 48°46′31″N 2°21′15″E
- Owner: Société du Grand Paris
- Operator: RATP Group
- Platforms: 2 side platforms
- Tracks: 2

Construction
- Structure type: Underground
- Accessible: Yes
- Architect: Franklin Azzi

Other information
- Station code: GA43 / 43C3C
- Fare zone: 3

History
- Opened: 24 June 2024

Services
| Preceding station | Paris Metro | Following station |
|---|---|---|
| Villejuif–Gustave Roussy towards Saint-Denis–Pleyel | Line 14 | Chevilly-Larue towards Aéroport d'Orly |
Location

L'Haÿ-les-Roses (French pronunciation: [laj le ʁoz]) is an underground station on Line 14 of the Paris Metro. It is part of the Grand Paris Express project. The station is located in the commune of L'Haÿ-les-Roses at the intersection of Rue de Bicêtre, Rue de Lallier and Rue Paul Hochart. The station opened on 24 June 2024 as part of the extension of Line 14 from Olympiades to Aéroport d'Orly.

== History ==
L'Haÿ-les-Roses station serves a densely populated area currently undergoing revitalization. The station is expected to act as a catalyst for a proposed urban renewal program for the area.

Construction of the station commenced in March 2018 under the leadership of a consortium led by Razel-Bec, a subsidiary of the Fayat Group. Franklin Azzi Architecture designed the station, while Studio Nonotak (Noemi Schipfer and Takami Nakamoto) contributed a complementary artistic work.

Initially named the Chevilly - Trois Communes project, the station's final name was chosen through a public consultation held from 20 June to 4 July 2022. Voters selected L'Haÿ-les-Roses, which was officially announced on 27 July 2022, other proposed names were Lallier-Bicêtre and Paul Hochart.

== Passenger services ==
=== Access ===
The resort has two entrances:

- access 1 Rue de Bicêtre;
- access 2 ZAC Lallier.

=== Platforms ===
The station is standard for line 14 with two 120m long platforms, with automatic platform screen doors rising to the ceiling, characteristic of the new stations of the southern extension of the line, to be in accordance with the new architectural standards of the Société des Grands Projets stations.

=== Other connections ===
The station is connected to lines 131, 286 of the RATP bus network and line v2 of the Valouette bus network.
