= Aéroport d'Orly station =

Paris Metro station at Orly Airport

Paray-Vieille-Poste Aéroport d'Orly
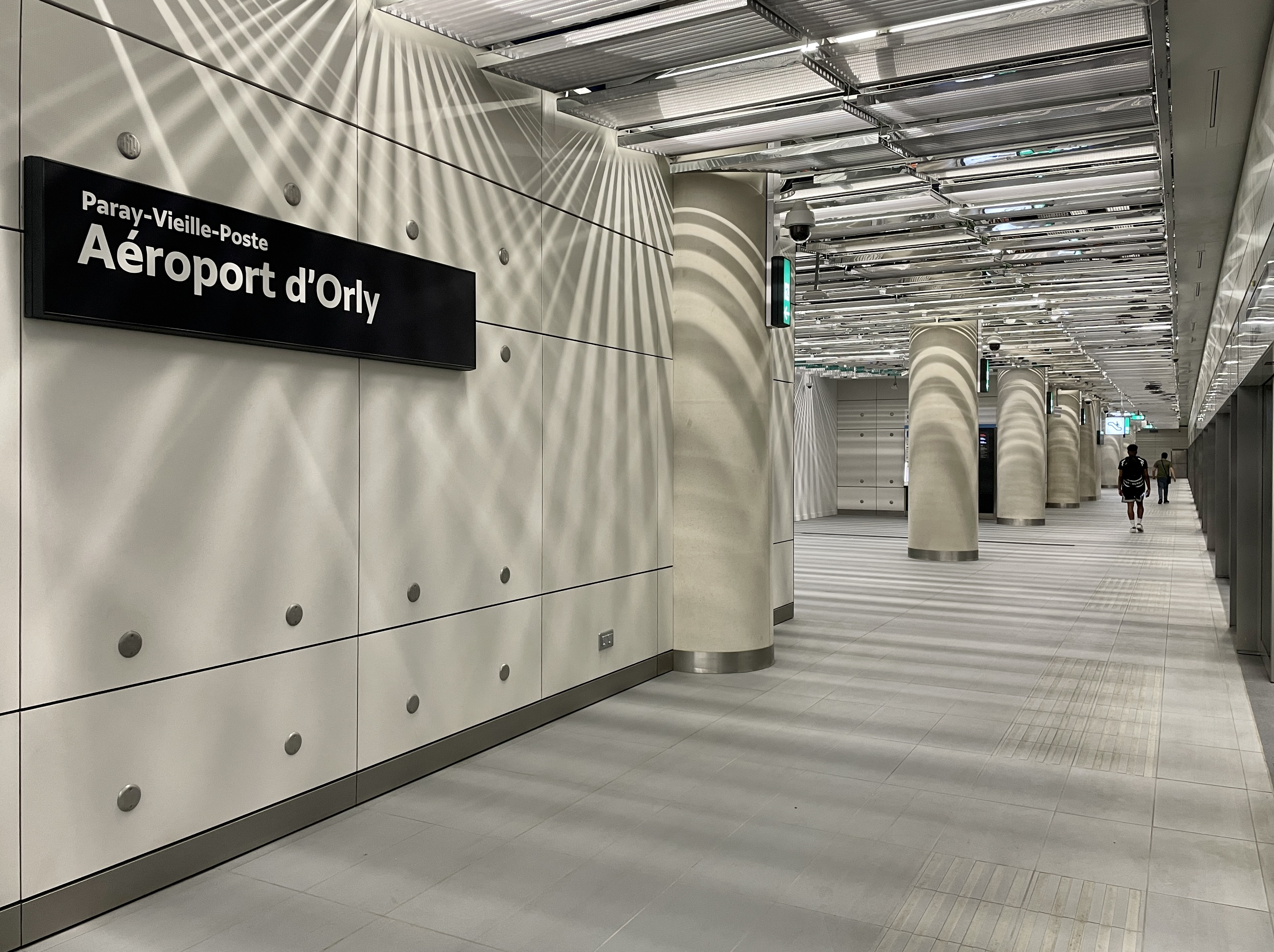
- Aéroport d'Orly station platform on opening day

General information
- Location: Orly Airport; Paray-Vieille-Poste; France
- Coordinates: 48°43′41″N 2°21′45″E
- Owner: Société du Grand Paris
- Operator: RATP Group
- Platforms: Line 14: 2 side platforms; Line 18: 2 side platforms
- Tracks: Line 14: 2; Line 18: 2
- Connections: at Orly 1, 2, 3

Construction
- Structure type: Underground
- Depth: 21 m (69 ft)
- Accessible: Yes
- Architect: Bernard Baret and François Tamisier

Other information
- Fare zone: 4

History
- Opened: 24 June 2024

Passengers
- 95,000 per day (projected)

Services
| Preceding station | Paris Metro | Following station |
|---|---|---|
| Thiais–Orly towards Saint-Denis–Pleyel | Line 14 | Terminus |

Future services
| Preceding station | Paris Metro | Following station |
|---|---|---|
| Antonypole–Wissous Centre towards Christ de Saclay | Line 18 (2027) | Terminus |
Location

Aéroport d'Orly (French pronunciation: [aeʁɔpɔʁ dɔʁli]) is a Paris Metro station serving as the southern terminus station of Line 14, built as part of the Grand Paris Express (GPE) project. It is located on the land of the commune Paray-Vieille-Poste and serves Orly Airport, about 13 kilometres (8.1 mi) south of Paris. The station opened with the extension of Line 14 to the south on 24 June 2024, shortly before the start of the 2024 Summer Olympics and 2024 Summer Paralympics.

== Location ==
The station is located just in front of the Terminal 3 building connecting the West (Terminal 1, 2) and South (Terminal 4) buildings. At the station, connections are available to Île-de-France tramway Line 7 and the Orlyval automated shuttle to Antony station on line RER B. As of 2025, it is the southernmost station in the system.

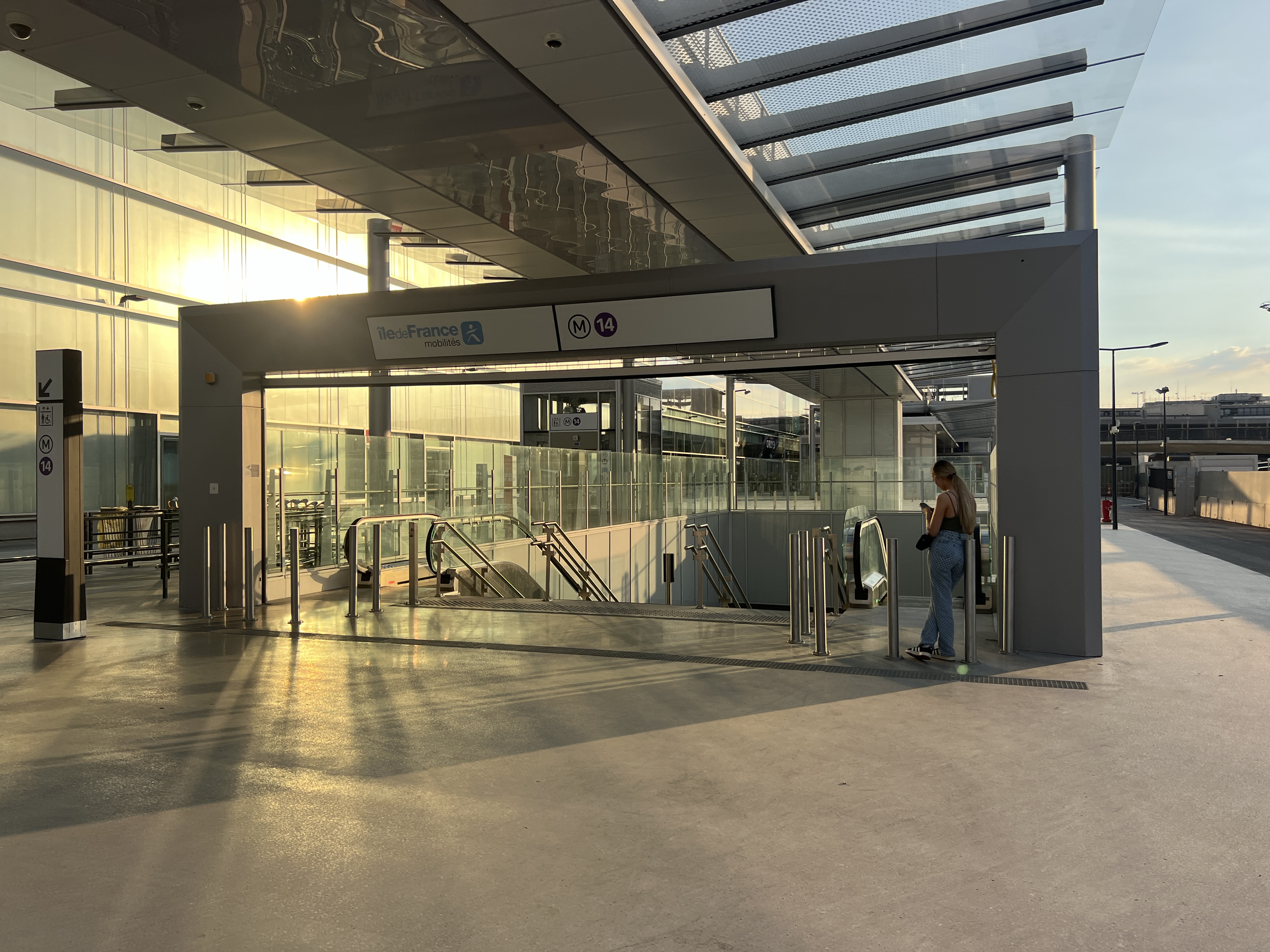
Station entrance

The station has two exits – one close to Terminals 1, 2 and 3 and one close to Terminal 4.

== History ==
Orly Airport is the primary airport for domestic flights between Paris and other cities in France. In 1980s, several projects to better connect the airport to Paris were proposed, including an extension of Paris Metro Line 7, an additional branch of the RER B, and an extension of the RER C. Ultimately, Orlyval – an automated shuttle from the airport to Antony station on RER B – was opened in 1991.

=== Line 14 ===
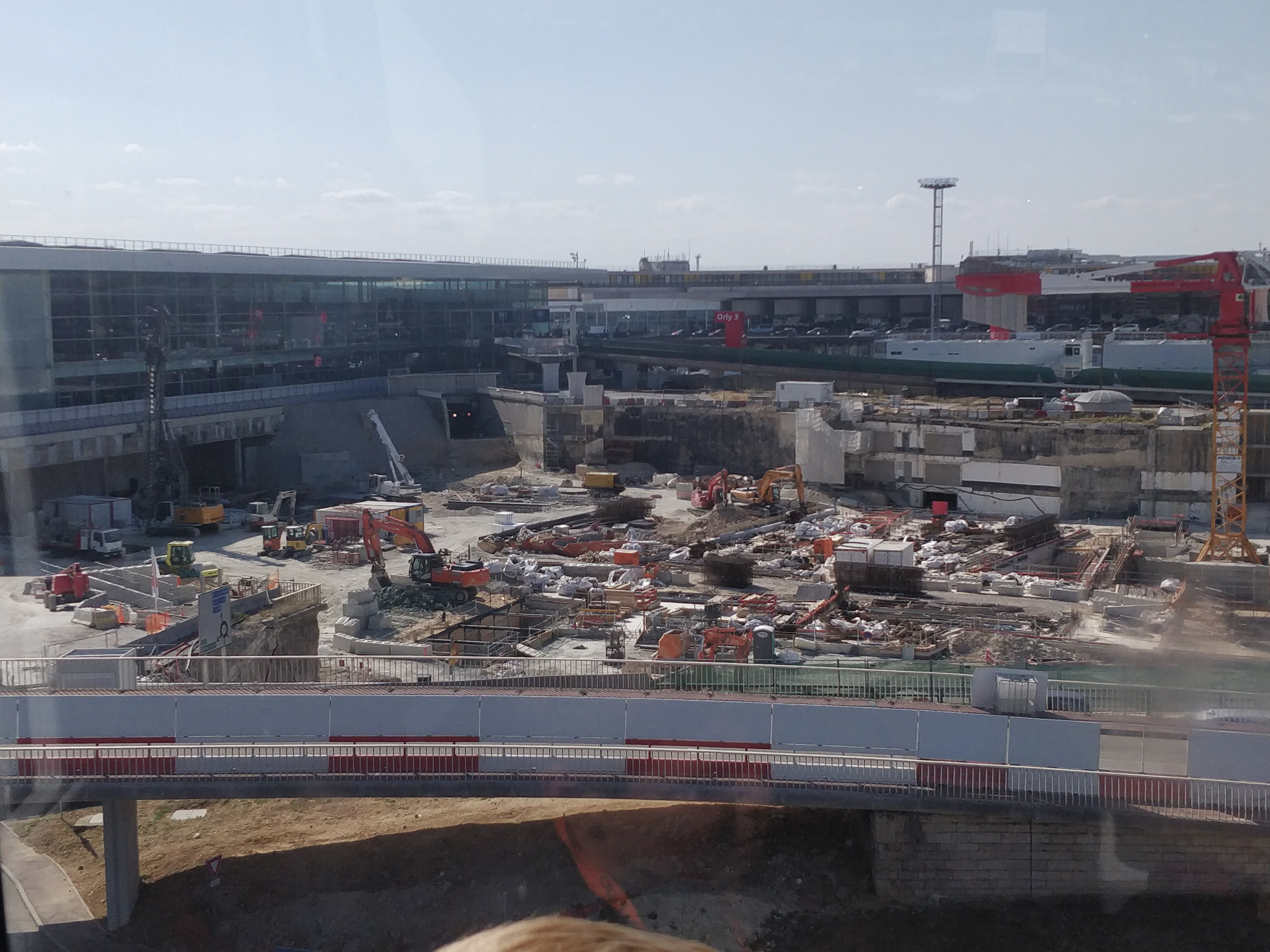
Station under construction in 2019

In the 2010s, discussions took place regarding whether to extend Line 14 further than its planned terminus at Maison Blanche. It was agreed that the line would be extended south to a station at Orly Airport. The declaration of public utility was in 2016, allowing construction on the extension to begin. The extension was originally planned to be completed in 2027, however delivery was accelerated to 2024 following the awarding of the 2024 Summer Olympics and 2024 Summer Paralympics.

Preliminary construction work began in March 2017 with the demolition of a road bridge opposite the drop-off point and the P0 parking extension. In April 2018, Groupe NGE and Salini were awarded the construction contract for tunnels and stations between Thiais–Orly and Aeroport d'Orly station, as well as the Morangis SMR.

Major construction of the station started in September 2018. In 2019, tunnelling under the airport began with the launch of a tunnel boring machine from Morangis, south of the airport. The 4.1 km tunnel to the Pont de Rungis station was completed in September 2020. In April 2023, testing of trains on the Line 14 extension began, with an opening date of 24 June 2024 set. Unlike other stations on the Grand Paris Express project, the construction of the station was managed by airport operator Groupe ADP.

=== Line 18 ===
Line 18 of Grand Paris Express is planned to start running from the station in 2027, serving Massy–Palaiseau, the Plateau de Saclay and Saint-Quentin-en-Yvelines. Thus, it will connect the airport to Paris-Saclay, a research and business cluster to the south of Paris that is currently under construction. In 2030, the line will reach Versailles Chantiers.

The declaration of public utility of Line 18 was in March 2017, allowing construction on the extension to begin. In May 2020, the construction contract for the tunnel, stations and service works between the future Aéroport d'Orly station and the Saclay plateau was awarded to Vinci Construction Spie Batignolles and Dodin Campenon-Bernard at a cost of €799 million.

The Aéroport d'Orly station was designed to accommodate both the Line 14 and Line 18 stations, with tunnelling of the future line under the airport taking place from December 2021 to June 2023.

=== Opening ===
The station opened on 24 June 2024 with the extension of Line 14 south from Olympiades. The station will be operated by RATP Dev from opening until at least 2027. The station will have a premium fare of €11.50, although holders of a Navigo pass will not have to pay the additional cost. Passengers will be able to access the centre of Paris around 25 minutes, saving around 10 minutes in journey time.

== Design ==
The station was designed by the operators of Orly Airport, Groupe ADP – with architecture by Bernard Baret and François Tamisier (chief architect of Groupe ADP).

The station features several pieces of public artwork. In the concourse, a 35 metre long and 7 metre high azulejos mosaic (traditional Portuguese ceramic tiles) showing landmarks such as the Palace of Versailles, Eiffel Tower and Stade de France was designed by Portuguese street artist Vhils. Murals by illustrator Edmond Baudoin are installed on the line 14 platforms.

== See also ==
- Orlyval
