= Lycée Georges Brassens (Villeneuve-le-Roi) =

Senior high school in France

Lycée Georges Brassens is a senior high school/sixth-form college in Villeneuve-le-Roi, Val-de-Marne, France, in the Paris metropolitan area.

== History ==
In May 2016, a teacher reported that the Lycée Georges Brassens in Villeneuve-le-Roi was contaminated with mold. This led to a temporary closure of the school on June 8, 2016, as ordered by the prefectural authorities. Dominique Chauvin, co-secretary general of the National Union of Secondary Education (Snes) in Créteil, highlighted the poor condition of the campus at that time.

In December 2017, a part of the roof in a third-floor classroom collapsed, raising concerns about asbestos. The teachers exercised their "right of withdrawal," leading to nearly two months of missed classes for the students. The teachers protested multiple times, demanding air quality tests and new buildings from the Academy and the District. Eventually, the administration decided to relocate the students to a substitute building in Vitry-Sur-Seine, another city in the district.
