= Villeneuve-le-Roi =

- Commune
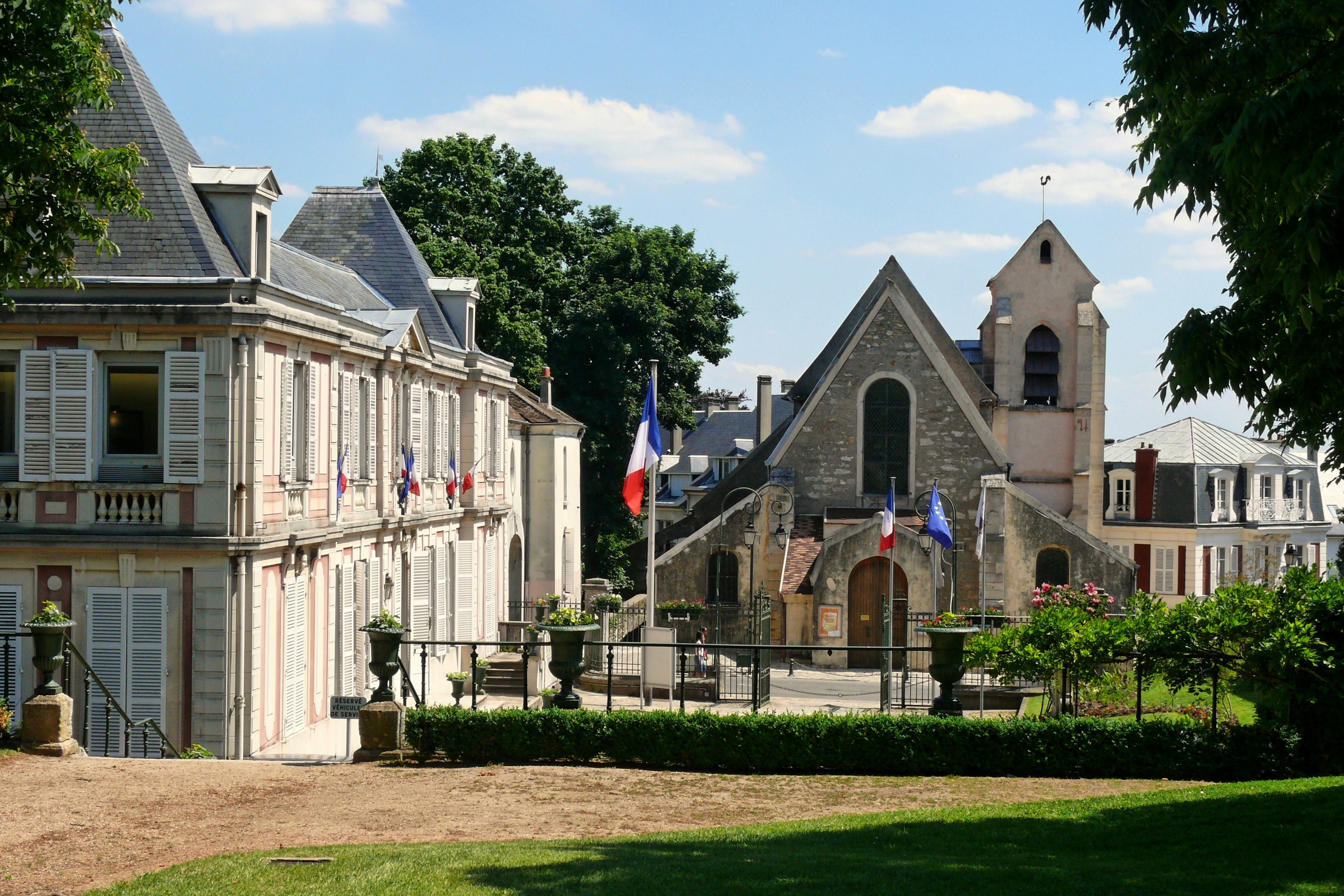
- The Hôtel de Ville (left) and the Church of Church of Saint-Pierre and Saint-Paul (right)

- Coat of arms

- Location (in red) within Paris inner suburbs
- Location of Villeneuve-le-Roi
- Location within France Location within Île-de-France (region)
- Coordinates: 48°44′00″N 2°25′00″E
- Country: France
- Region: Île-de-France
- Department: Val-de-Marne
- Arrondissement: L'Haÿ-les-Roses
- Canton: Orly
- Intercommunality: Grand Paris

Government
  - Mayor (2026–32): Didier Gonzales
- Area^{1}: 8.40 km^{2} (3.24 sq mi)
- Highest elevation: 91 m (299 ft)
- Lowest elevation: 30 m (98 ft)
- Population (2023): 21,000
  - Density: 2,500/km^{2} (6,500/sq mi)
- Time zone: UTC+01:00 (CET)
  - Summer (DST): UTC+02:00 (CEST)
- INSEE/Postal code: 94077 /94290
- Website: www.villeneuve-le-roi.fr
- ^{1} French Land Register data, which excludes lakes, ponds, glaciers > 1 km^{2} (0.386 sq mi or 247 acres) and river estuaries.

Villeneuve-le-Roi (French pronunciation: [vilnœv lə ʁwa]) is a commune in the southern suburbs of Paris, France. It is located 13.7 km (8.5 mi) from the centre of Paris. The early 19th-century French orientalist Jean-Baptiste Rousseau (1780–1831) was born in Villeneuve-le-Roi on the boat that arrived from Auxerre.

Orly Airport is partially located in the commune.

== History ==
The Hôtel de Ville was built as a private residence in around 1860.

== Population ==
Historical population

Year	Pop.	±% p.a.
1793	480	—
1821	423	−0.45%
1846	471	+0.43%
1872	478	+0.06%
1886	626	+1.95%
1896	782	+2.25%
1901	1,243	+9.71%
1906	1,871	+8.52%
1911	2,780	+8.24%
1921	4,558	+5.07%
1926	8,388	+12.97%
1931	13,747	+10.38%
1936	14,400	+0.93%

Year	Pop.	±% p.a.
1946	14,794	+0.27%
1954	16,715	+1.54%
1962	22,300	+3.67%
1968	23,074	+0.57%
1975	21,096	−1.27%
1982	20,512	−0.40%
1990	20,325	−0.11%
1999	18,292	−1.16%
2007	18,503	+0.14%
2012	19,782	+1.35%
2017	21,384	+1.57%
2023	21,000	−0.30%

Source: EHESS and INSEE (1968-2023)

== Transport ==
Villeneuve-le-Roi is served by Villeneuve-le-Roi station on Paris RER line C.

== Education ==
Communal schools include:

- Preschools (écoles maternelles): Cites-Unies, Paul-Painlevé, Paul-Bert, Paul-Eluard, Pauline-Kergomard, and Annie-Fratellini
- Elementary schools: Paul-Bert, Paul-Painlevé, Jules-Ferry, and Jean-Moulin

There are two junior high schools:

- Collège Jean Macé Villeneuve Le Roi
- Collège Jules Ferry

There is one senior high school: Lycée Georges Brassens.

The commune has a public library, Bibliothèque municipale Anatole-France.

== Twin towns – sister cities ==
Villeneuve-le-Roi is twinned with:

- Arpino, Italy
- São Pedro do Sul, Portugal
- Stourport-on-Severn, England, United Kingdom
- Vratsa, Bulgaria

== See also ==
- Communes of the Val-de-Marne department
