= Choisy-le-Roi station =

Railway station in Choisy-le-Roi, France

Choisy-le-Roi
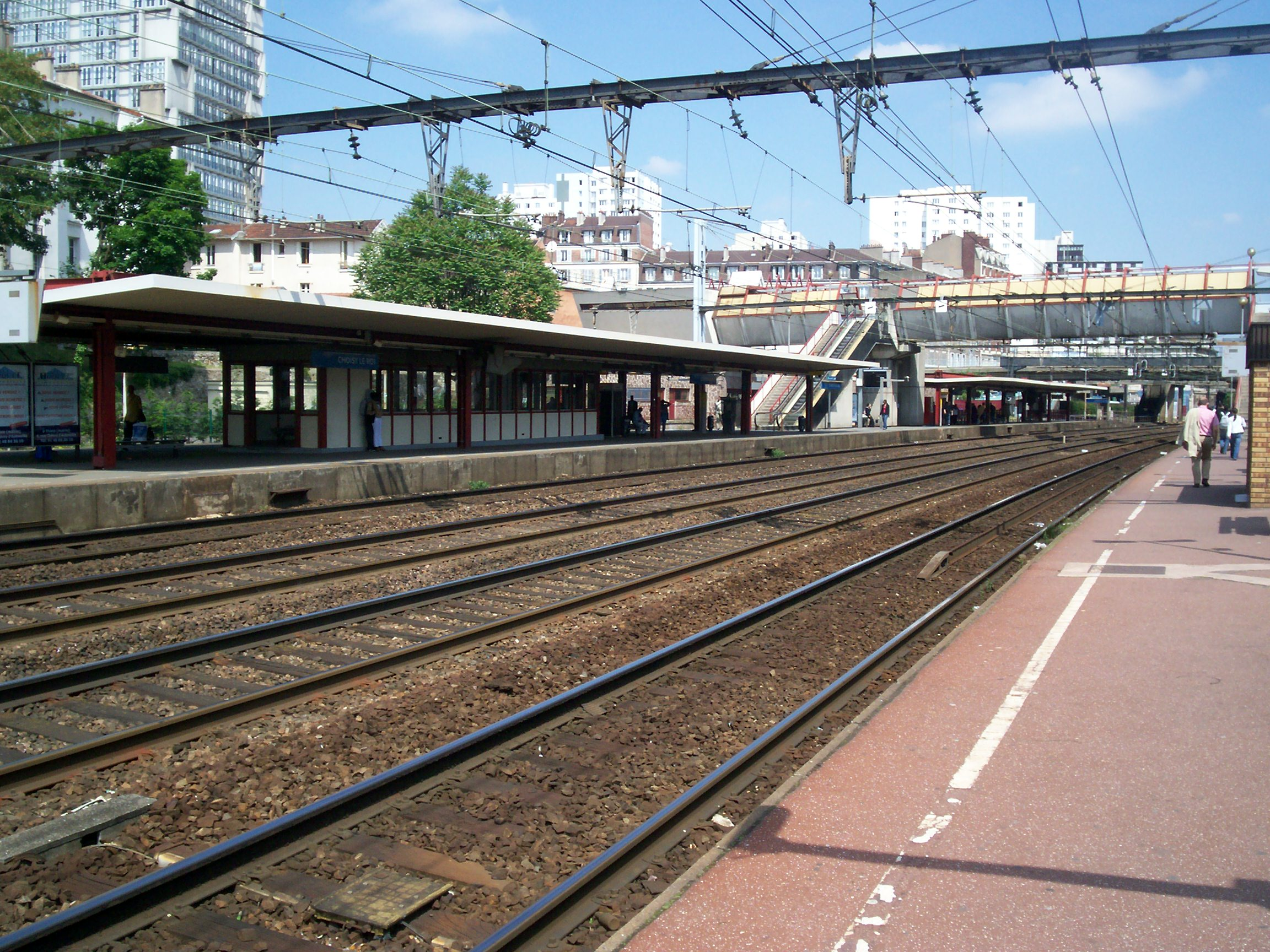
- Choisy-le-Roi railway station

General information
- Location: Choisy-le-Roi, Val-de-Marne, Île-de-France, France
- Coordinates: 48°45′51″N 2°24′40″E
- Line: Paris–Bordeaux railway RER C

Other information
- Station code: 87545285

Passengers
- 2024: 12,833,963

Services
Preceding station	RER	Following station
Les Ardoines towards Pontoise, Versailles Château Rive Gauche or Saint-Quentin-en-Yvelines	RER C	Les Saules towards Massy-Palaiseau
Les Ardoines towards Pontoise, Versailles Château Rive Gauche or Saint-Quentin-en-Yvelines	RER C	Villeneuve-le-Roi towards Dourdan-la-Forêt, Saint-Martin-d'Étampes or Versailles Chantiers
Location

Choisy-le-Roi station (French: Gare de Choisy-le-Roi) is a station in Paris' express suburban rail system, the RER. It is situated on the Paris–Bordeaux railway. It serves the commune of Choisy-le-Roi, in the Val-de-Marne department.

== See also ==
- List of stations of the Paris RER
