= Île-de-France tramway Line 7 =

Suburban tram line in Val-de-Marne and Essonne, south of Paris

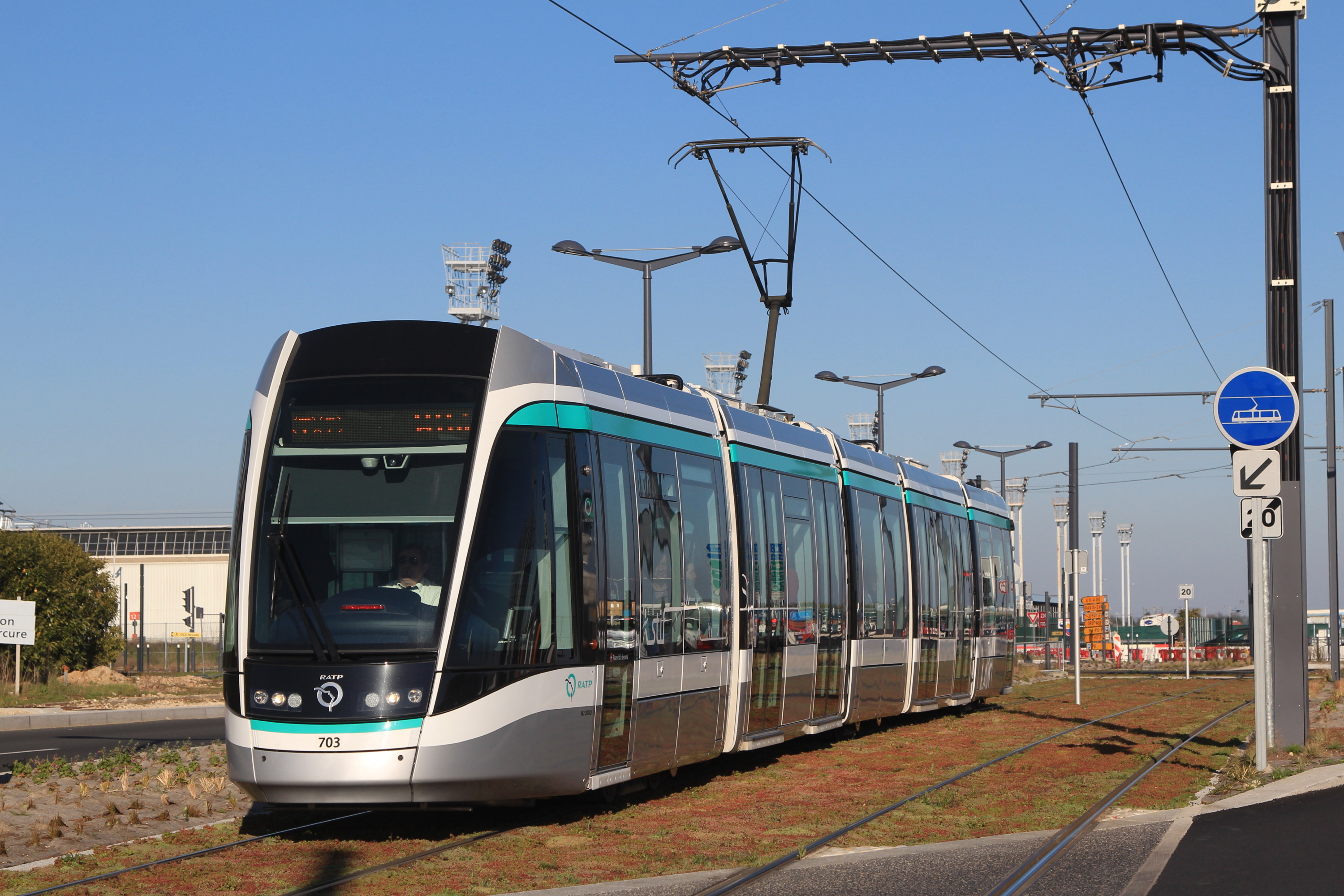
- Île-de-France tramway Line 7 between the Cœur d'Orly and Aéroport d'Orly stops

Overview
- Owner: Île-de-France Mobilités
- Termini: Villejuif–Louis Aragon; Porte de l'Essonne
- Stations: 18

Service
- Type: Tram
- System: Tramways in Île-de-France
- Operator: RATP Group
- Rolling stock: 19 Alstom Citadis
- Daily ridership: 25,000

History
- Opened: 16 November 2013; 12 years ago

Technical
- Line length: 11.2 km (7.0 mi)
- Track gauge: 1,435 mm (4 ft 8 1/2 in) standard gauge
Route map

Île-de-France tramway Line 7 (usually called simply T7) is part of the modern tram network of the Île-de-France region of France. Line T7 runs between Villejuif – Louis Aragon in Villejuif (where it connects to the Paris Métro) and Porte de l'Essonne in Athis-Mons, south of Paris. It also serves Paris Orly Airport. The line has a length of 11.2 km (7.0 mi) and 18 stations. It opened to the public on 16 November 2013.

The line is operated by the RATP Group under contract with Île-de-France Mobilités.

Unlike Orlyval and Paris Metro line 14, there is no premium charge for travel to or from Orly Airport on this line; the normal fare of €2.05 applies.

== Projects ==
=== Extension to Juvisy-sur-Orge ===
An extension of Line T7 from its current terminus at Athis-Mons to Juvisy station at Juvisy-sur-Orge is currently at the planning stage. The extension would be 3.7 km (2.3 mi) long and have six new stations.
