= Bièvre bus network =

Bièvre
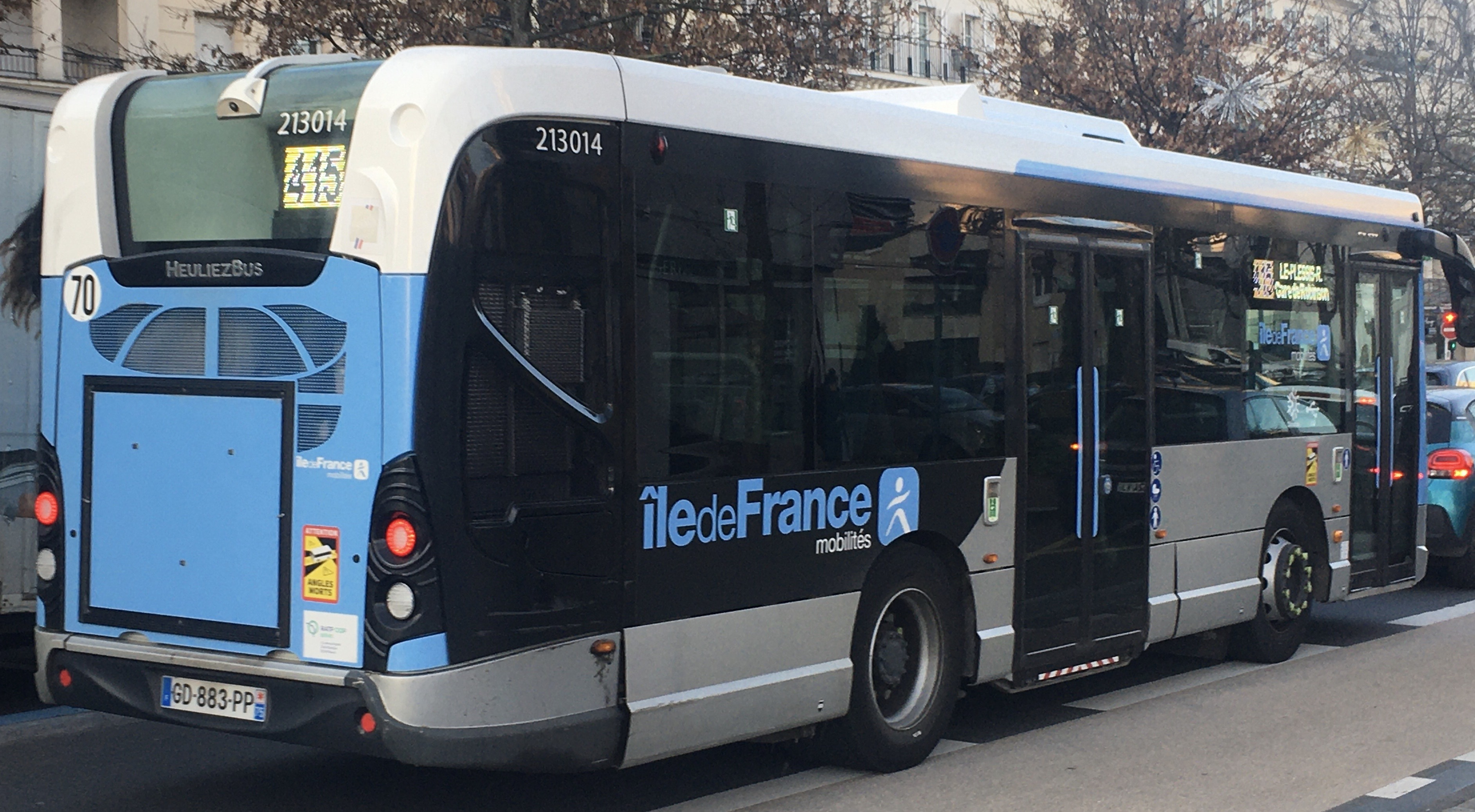
- Heuliez GX 137 n°213014 on line 415, Le Plessis-Robinson.
- Parent: Île-de-France Mobilités
- Founded: August 1st, 2022
- Service area: Essonne: Massy, Verrières-le-Buisson, Wissous; Hauts-de-Seine: Antony, Châtenay-Malabry, Le Plessis-Robinson
- Routes: 401 402 408 409 412 415 418
- Operator: RATP Cap Île-de-France (RATP Cap Bièvre)
- Website: Bièvre website

Bièvre bus network is a French bus network run by Île-de-France Mobilités, operated by RATP Cap Île-de-France through his subsidiary RATP Cap Bièvre from August 1st, 2022.

It consists of seven lines, which mainly serve the basin of the Bièvre.

== History ==
Bièvre bus network is now made up of eight lines from the former bus network Le Paladin, mainly serving the municipalities of Hauts-de-Seine including Antony, Châtenay-Malabry, Clamart, Le Plessis-Robinson and municipalities of Essonne including Massy, Verrières-le-Buisson and Wissous.

== Network development ==
=== Former network ===
On January 2, 2006, the network was significantly expanded with the creation of lines 8, 9 and 12.

On May 26, 2007, the network is undergoing an initial restructuring with a simplification of the line 8 and the abandonment of service to Sceaux and Bourg-la-Reine by the line 12.

On August 26, 2013, the line 1 is diverted through Wissous and the district Saint-Éloi.

Due to the opening up of the competition of public transport in Île-de-France, Le Paladin changed to Bièvre on August 1, 2022, corresponding to public service delegation number 37 established by Île-de-France Mobilités. A call for tenders was therefore launched by the organizing authority in order to designate a company that will succeed the operation of Transdev Bièvre Bus Mobilités for a period of eight years. It was finally RATP Cap Île-de-France, via its subsidiary RD Bièvre, which was designated during the board of directors on October 12, 2021.

At the time of its opening to competition, the network consisted of lines 1, 2, 4, 8, 9, 12, 15 and 18 of the former bus network, Le Paladin. Lines 3, 6, 7, 11, 14, 16 and 17 are integrated into the Vallée Sud Bus network.

From June 26, 2023, the lines are renamed according to a new numbering system implemented by Île-de-France Mobilités. Lines 4 and 12 merged to become line 412. In addition, some lines see their lines modified.

From June 24, 2023. RATP Cap Bièvre also operates Tramway line 10.

=== Network renaming ===
As of June 26, 2023, the Bièvre network is one of the first to apply the new principle of unique regional numbering planned by Île-de-France Mobilités, removing duplicates concurrently with the commissioning of the Île-de-France tramway line 10. The correspondence between old and new numbers is as follows:

This next table shows the renaming of the bus network between old and new number lines.

Network renaming
Old	New
1	401
2	402
8	408
9	409
4; 12	412
15	415
18	418

== Routes ==
Image	Line	First direction	Second direction
	401	Gare d'Anthony	Wissous — Villemilan
	402	Gare d'Anthony	Massy — ZAC du Moulin
	408	Gare d'Anthony	Verrières-le-Buisson — Mairie
	409	Gare d'Anthony	Massy — Hôpital Jacques Cartier
	412	Gare de La Croix de Berny	Châtenay-Malabry — Lycée Polyvalent
	415	Verrières-le-Buisson — Sophie Barat	Gare de Robinson
	418	Verrières-le-Buisson — Sophie Barat	Verrières-le-Buisson — Jean Moulin

== See also ==
- Île-de-France Mobilités
- Île-de-France tramway Line 10
