= Fontaine-Michalon station =

Railway station in Antony, France

Fontaine-Michalon
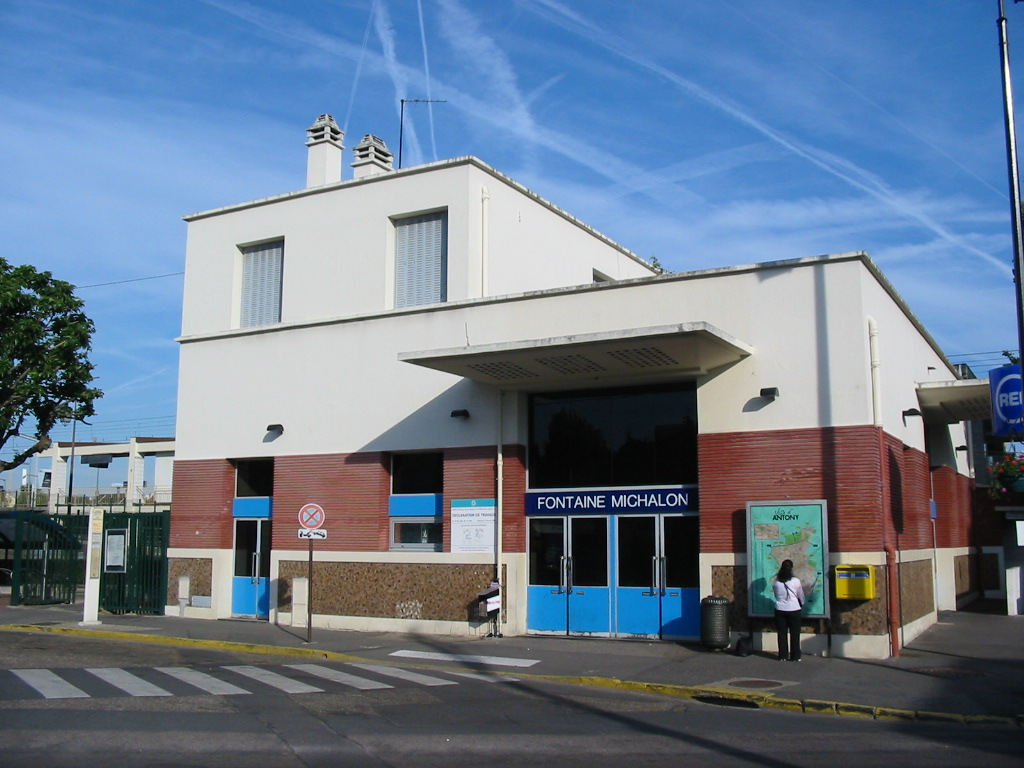
- Fontaine-Michalon station entrance

General information
- Location: Antony; France
- Coordinates: 48°44′36″N 2°17′47″E
- Operator: RATP Group
- Line: Ligne de Sceaux
- Platforms: 2 side platforms
- Tracks: 2

Construction
- Structure type: Elevated
- Accessible: Yes, by request to staff

Other information
- Station code: 87758763
- Fare zone: 4

Services
Preceding station	RER	Following station
Antony towards Aéroport Charles de Gaulle 2 TGV or Mitry–Claye	RER B	Les Baconnets towards Saint-Rémy-lès-Chevreuse
Location

Fontaine-Michalon station is a station on Line B of the Réseau Express Régional system serving the city of Antony, Hauts-de-Seine, France, a southern suburb of Paris.
