= Massy–Verrières station =

Railway station in Massy, France

Massy–Verrières
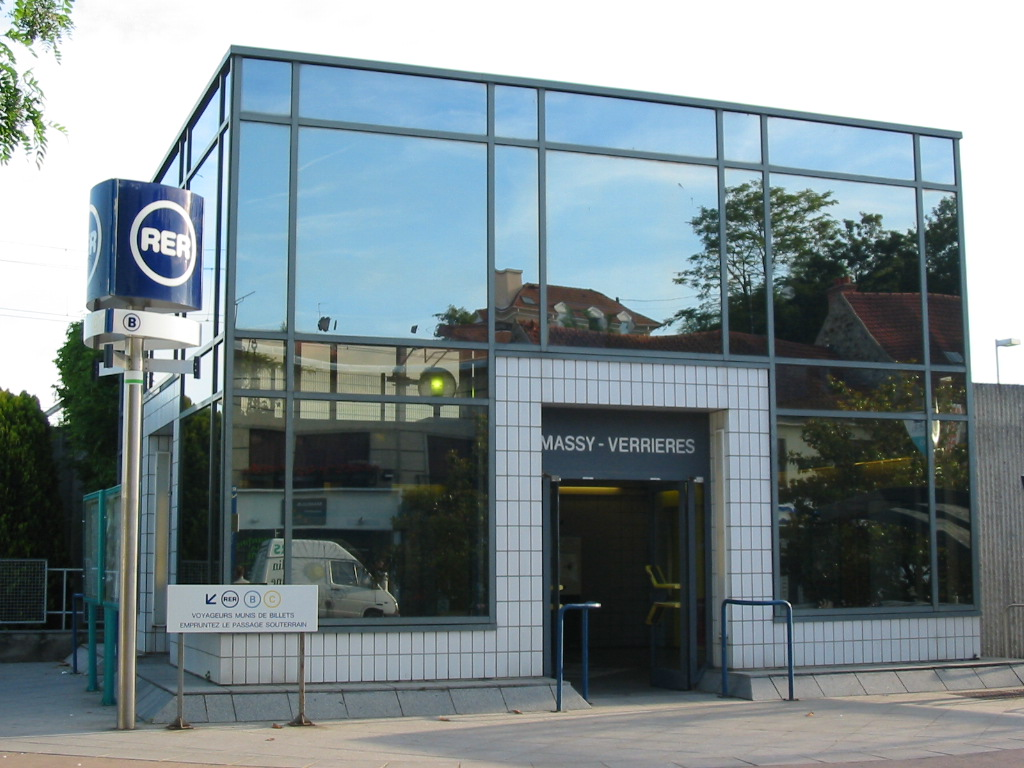
- Massy-Verrières station entrance

General information
- Location: Avenue de Verrieres; Massy; France
- Coordinates: 48°44′5″N 2°16′24″E
- Operator: RER B: RATP Group; RER C: SNCF
- Lines: RER B: Ligne de Sceaux; RER C: Ligne de Choisy-le-Roi–Massy
- Platforms: 2 side platforms 1 island platform
- Tracks: 4 + bypass track

Construction
- Structure type: Embankment
- Parking: Yes
- Accessible: RER B: Yes, by request to staff; RER C: No

Other information
- Station code: 87383281
- Fare zone: 4

Services
| Preceding station | RER | Following station |
|---|---|---|
| Les Baconnets towards Aéroport Charles de Gaulle 2 TGV or Mitry–Claye | RER B | Massy-Palaiseau towards Saint-Rémy-lès-Chevreuse |
| Chemin d'Antony towards Pontoise | RER C | Massy-Palaiseau Terminus |
Location

Massy–Verrières station is a station of the Île-de-France RER, in Massy, at the junction of RER B (B4 section) and RER C (C2 section).
