= Antony station =

Railway station in Antony, France

Antony
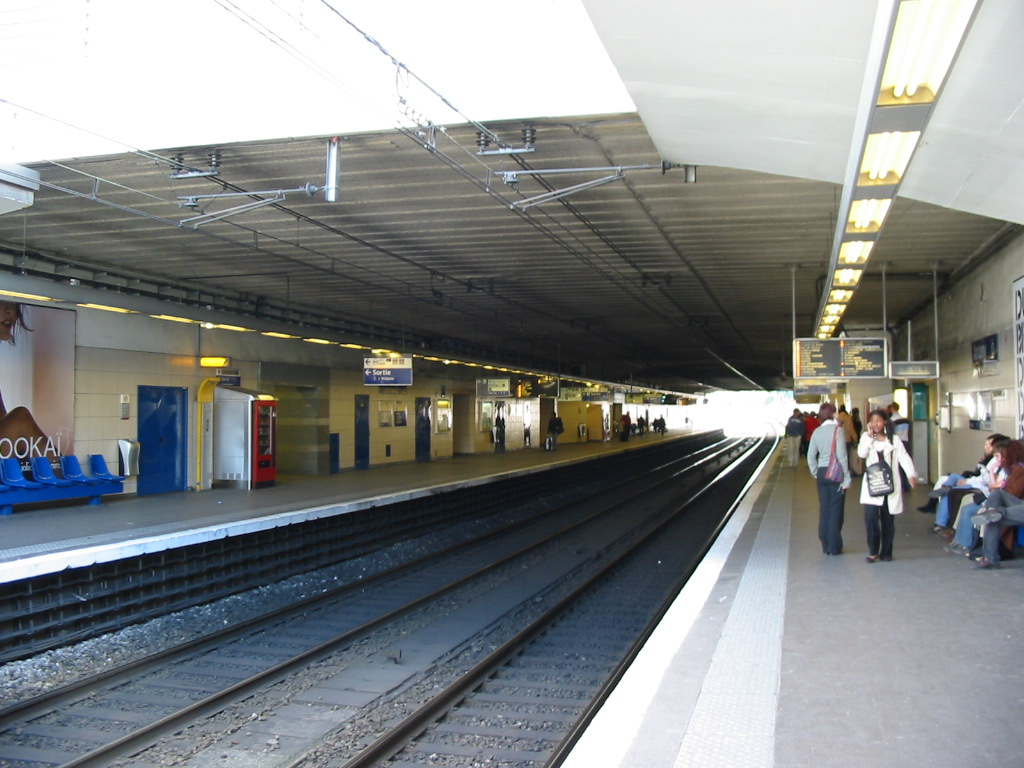
- RER B platform

General information
- Location: France
- Coordinates: 48°45′16″N 2°18′03″E
- Operator: RATP Group
- Line: Ligne de Sceaux
- Platforms: RER: 2 side platforms; Orlyval: 2 side platforms
- Tracks: RER: 2; Orlyval: 2
- Connections: RATP Bus: 196 286 297 395; Bièvre: 401 402 408 409 412; VSGP: 3

Construction
- Structure type: Below-grade
- Accessible: RER: Yes, by request to staff; Orlyval: Yes

Other information
- Station code: 87758755
- Fare zone: 3

History
- Opened: 29 July 1854
- Rebuilt: 1937, 1977, 1991

Passengers
- 2019: 6,304,424

Services
Preceding station	RER	Following station
La Croix de Berny towards Aéroport Charles de Gaulle 2 TGV or Mitry–Claye	RER B	Fontaine-Michalon towards Saint-Rémy-lès-Chevreuse
Preceding station	Transport in Paris	Following station
Terminus	Orlyval	Orly 1, 2, 3 towards Orly 4
Location

Antony station (French: Gare d'Antony) is a station on the line B of the Réseau Express Régional, a hybrid suburban commuter and rapid transit line. It is named after the city of Antony, Hauts-de-Seine where the station is located. The station allows the transfer from the RER B to Orlyval, a small automated light rail shuttle service to Orly Airport.

== History ==
- 1937: Station built as part of Ligne de Sceaux
- 1977: Station integrated in RER B
- 2 October 1991: Opening of Orlyval

== Gallery ==
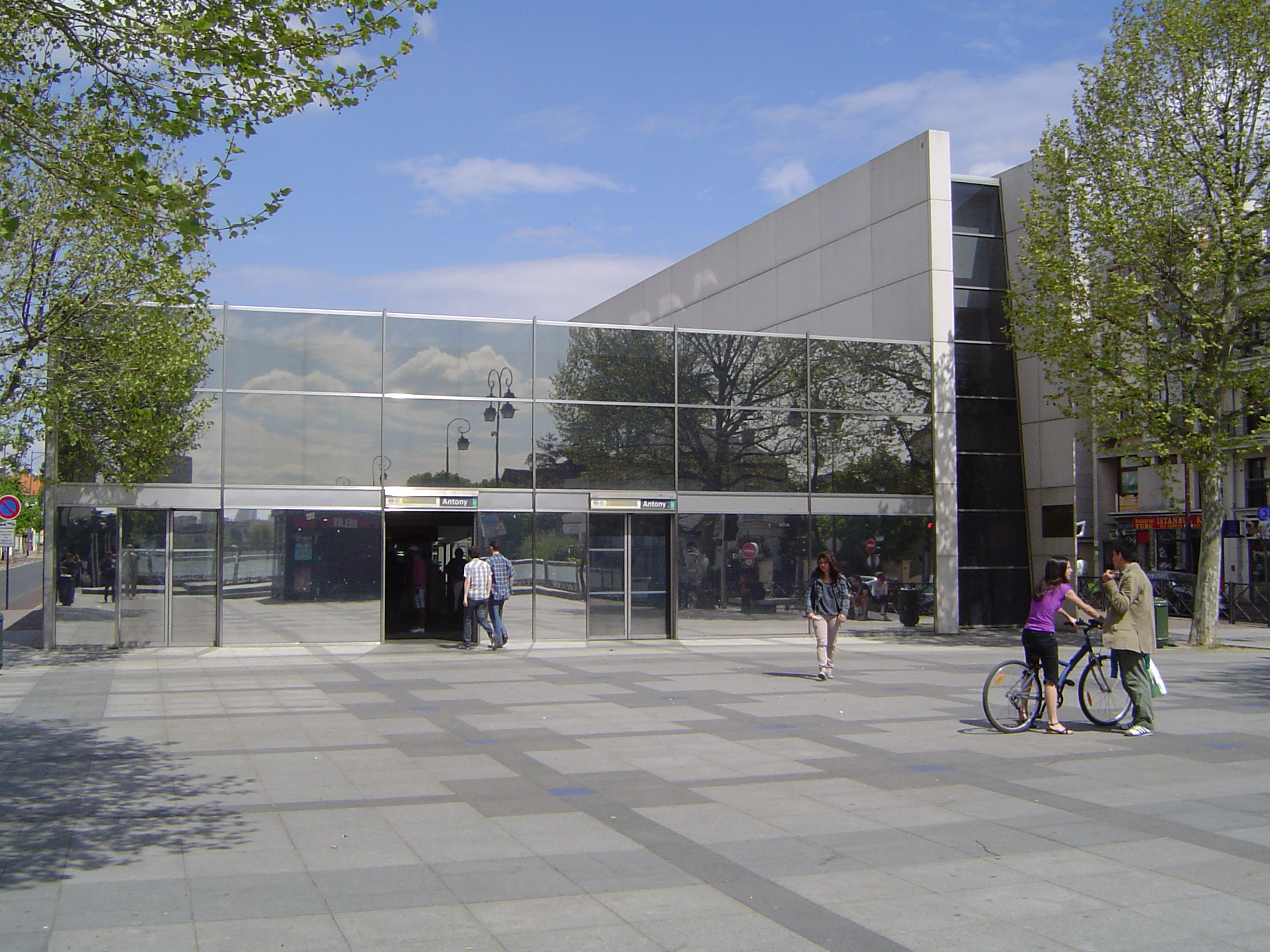
Entrance

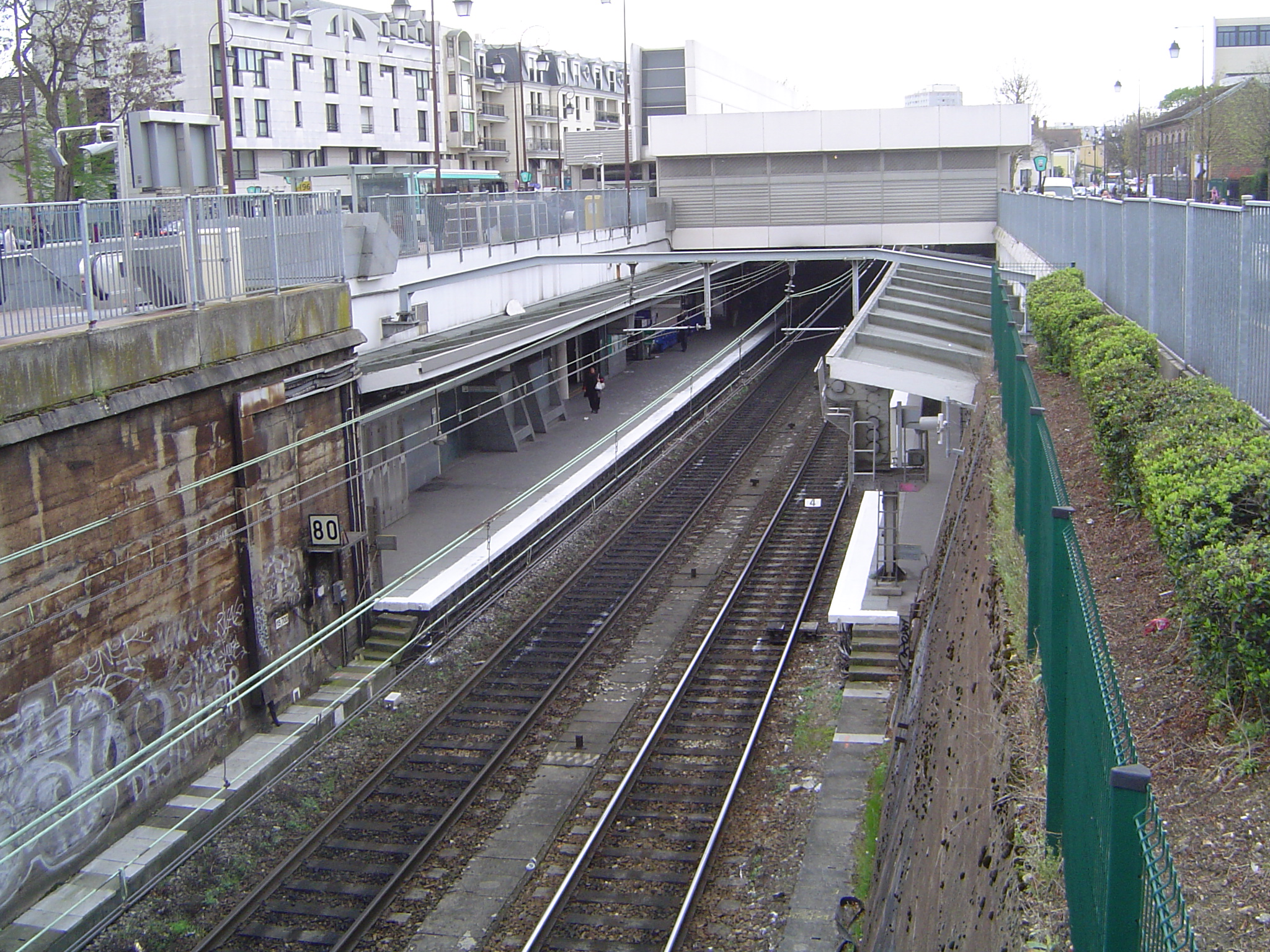
RER B platform

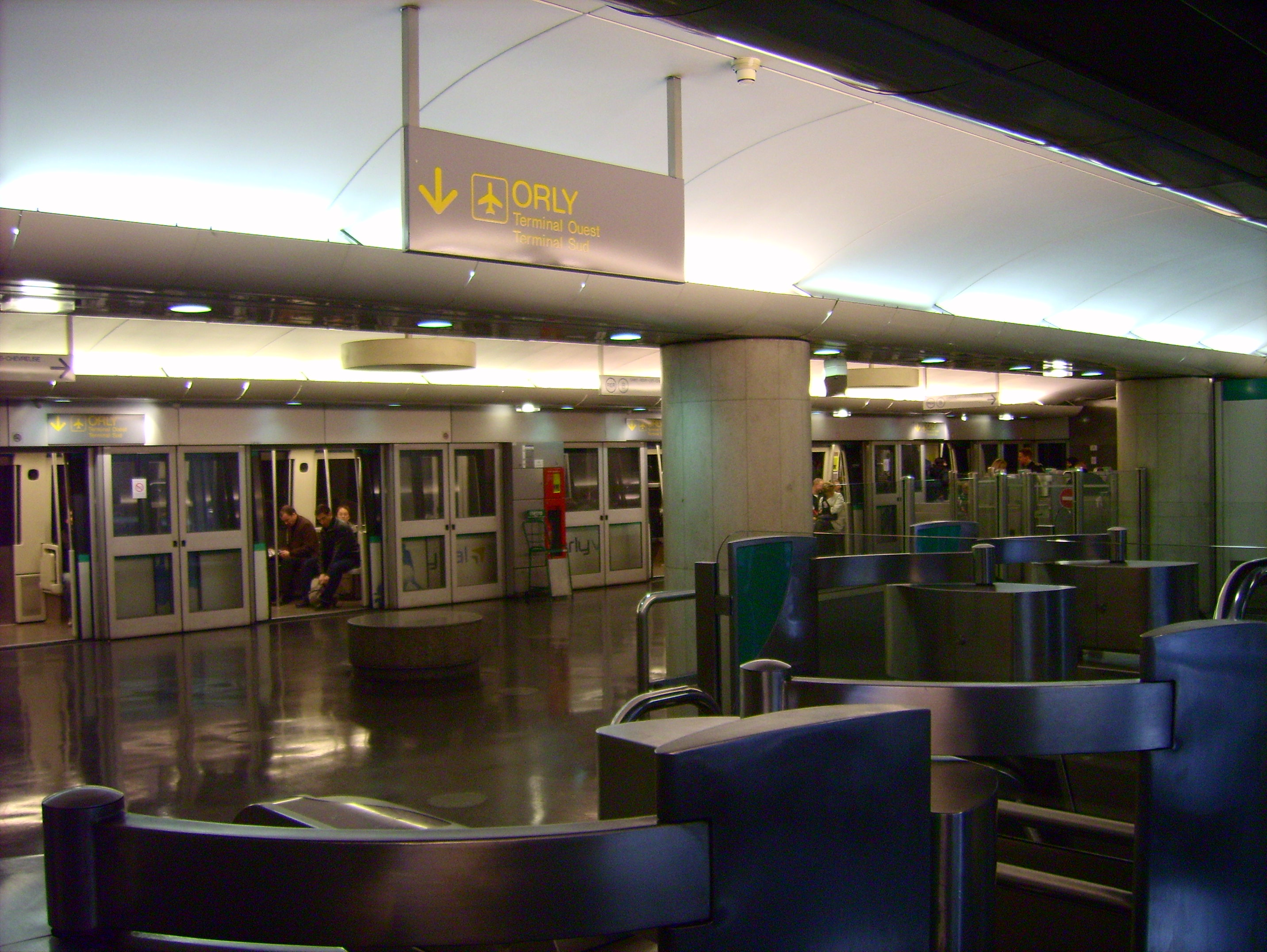
Orlyval platform

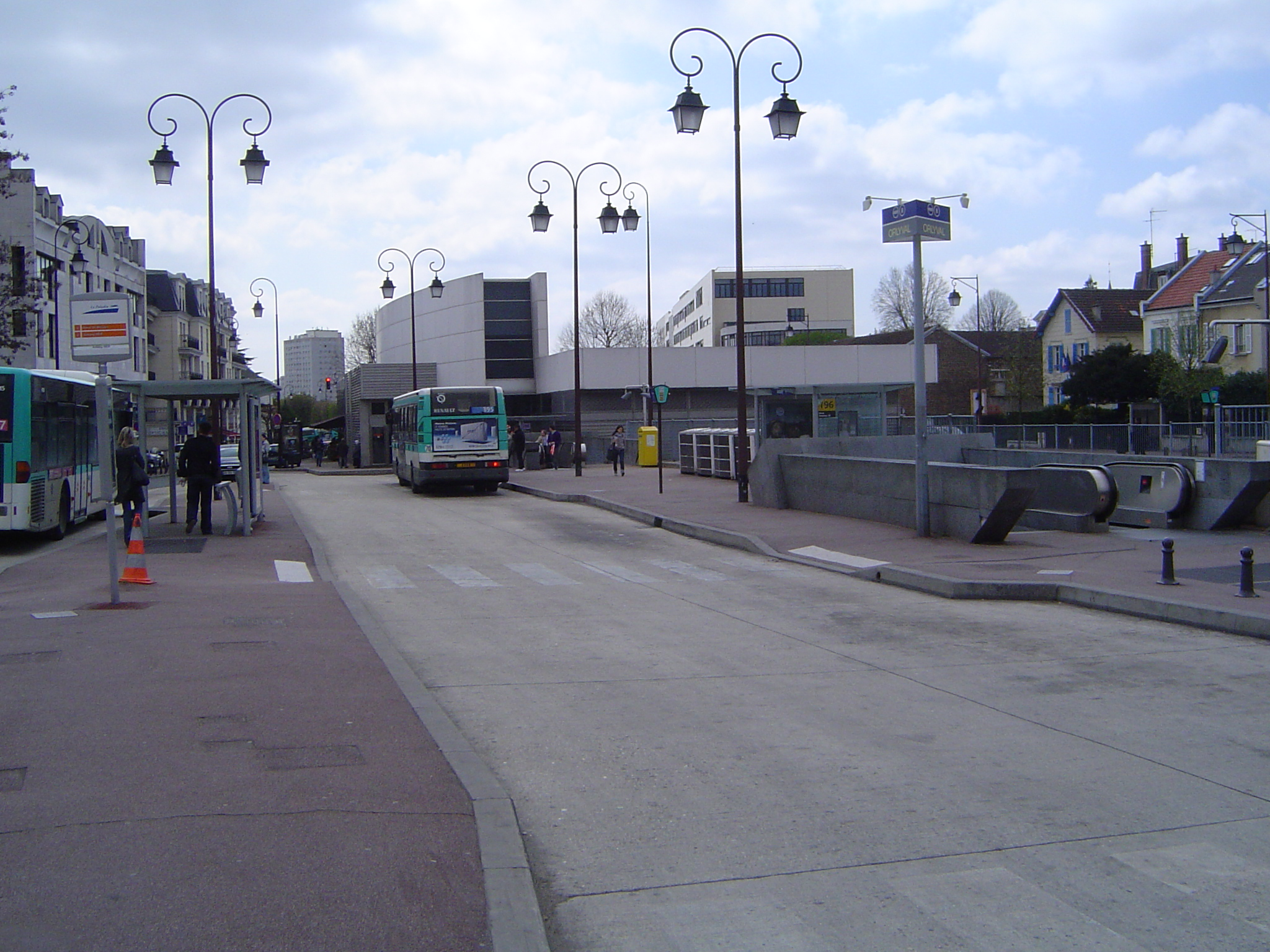
Bus station
