= Paris Orly Airport =

Secondary airport serving Paris, France

Paris Orly Airport Aéroport de Paris-Orly

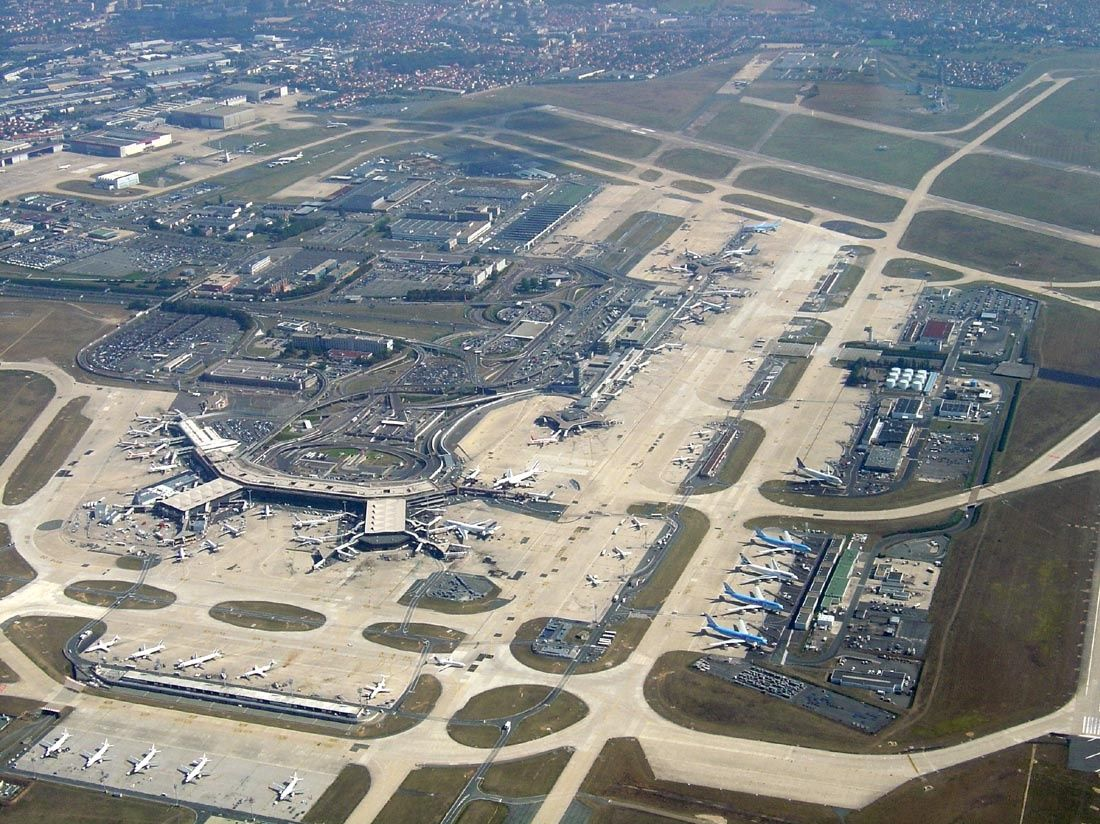
- IATA: ORY; ICAO: LFPO; WMO: 07149

Summary
- Airport type: Public
- Owner: Groupe ADP
- Operator: Paris Aéroport
- Serves: Paris metropolitan area
- Location: Essonne and the Val-de-Marne, France
- Opened: 1932; 94 years ago
- Hub for: Air Caraïbes
- Operating base for: Corsair International; easyJet; French Bee; La Compagnie; Transavia France; Vueling
- Built: 1 January 1918; 108 years ago
- Elevation AMSL: 89 m (292 ft)
- Coordinates: 48°43′24″N 02°22′46″E
- Website: parisaeroport.fr/en/orly-airport

Maps
- Airport diagram (2024)

- Location of airport in Île-de-France region ORY/LFPO (France)

Runways
Direction	Length		Surface
Direction	m	ft	Surface
02/20	2,400	7,874	Asphalt
06/24	3,650	11,975	Asphalt
07/25	3,320	10,892	Asphalt

Statistics (2025)
- Total passengers: 34,928,909
- Aircraft movements: 216,101
- Source: French AIP, French AIP at EUROCONTROL, Statistics

Paris Orly Airport (French: Aéroport de Paris-Orly, pronounced [aeʁɔpɔʁ də paʁi ɔʁli]; IATA: ORY, ICAO: LFPO) is one of two international airports serving Paris, France, the other one being Charles de Gaulle Airport (CDG). It is located partially in and named after Orly, 13 kilometres (8 mi; 7 nmi) south of Paris.

The airport served as the secondary hub for Air France until March 2026, handling many flights to domestic and overseas French territories. Most of these services have transferred to Charles de Gaulle Airport, with domestic routes from Orly handed over to the airline's low-cost subsidiary, Transavia France. Public service obligation (PSO) routes from the airport to Corsica continue to be operated by Air France. Orly operates flights to destinations in Europe, the Middle East, Africa, the Caribbean, South America, and North America.

Before the opening of CDG in 1974, Orly was the main airport of Paris. Even with the shift of most international traffic to CDG, Orly remains the busiest French airport for domestic traffic and the second busiest French airport overall in passenger traffic, with 35 million passengers in 2025. It is served by Aéroport d'Orly station of the Paris Metro.

== Location ==
Orly Airport covers 15.3 km^{2} (5.9 sq mi) of land. The airport area, including terminals and runways, spans over two departments and seven communes:

- Essonne department: communes of Paray-Vieille-Poste (West Terminal and half of South Terminal), Wissous, Athis-Mons, Chilly-Mazarin, and Morangis;
- Val-de-Marne department: communes of Villeneuve-le-Roi and Orly (half of South Terminal).

Management of the airport, however, is solely under the authority of Aéroports de Paris (ADP), which also manages Charles de Gaulle Airport, Le Bourget Airport, and several smaller airports in the suburbs of Paris.

== History ==
=== First years ===
Originally known as Villeneuve-Orly Airport, the facility was opened in the southern suburbs of Paris in 1932 as a secondary airport to Le Bourget. Before this two huge airship hangars had been built there by the engineer Eugène Freyssinet from 1923 on.

=== World War II ===
As a result of the Battle of France in 1940, Orly Airport was used by the occupying German Luftwaffe as a combat airfield, stationing various fighter and bomber units at the airport throughout the occupation. Consequently, Orly was repeatedly attacked by the Royal Air Force and United States Army Air Forces (USAAF), destroying much of its infrastructure, and leaving its runways with numerous bomb craters to limit its usefulness to the Germans.

After the Battle of Normandy and the retreat of German forces from the Paris area in August 1944, Orly was partially repaired by USAAF combat engineers and was used by Ninth Air Force as tactical airfield A-47. The 50th Fighter Group flew P-47 Thunderbolt fighter-bomber aircraft from the airport until September, then liaison squadrons used the airfield until October 1945.

=== Post-war ===
The USAAF diagram from March 1947 shows the 6,140-foot (1,870 m) 27/207 (degrees magnetic) runway (later 03R) with 5,170-foot (1,580 m) 81/261 runway (later 08L) crossing it at its north end. The November 1953 Aeradio diagram shows four concrete runways, all 197 feet (60 m) wide: 03L 7,874 ft (2,400 m), 03R 6,069 ft (1,850 m), 08L 5,118 ft (1,560 m) and 08R 6,627 ft (2,020 m).

The American United States Army Air Forces 1408th Army Air Force Base Unit was the primary operator at Orly Field until March 1947 when control was returned to the French Government. (The United States Air Force leased a small portion of the Airport to support Supreme Headquarters Allied Powers Europe (SHAPE) at Rocquencourt). The Americans left in 1967 as a result of France's withdrawal from NATO's integrated military command, and all non-French NATO forces were asked to leave France.

In May 1958, Pan Am Douglas DC-7Cs flew to Los Angeles in 21 hours and 56 minutes; Trans World Airlines, Air France and Pan Am flew nonstop to New York in 14 h 10–15 min. Air France flew to Tokyo in 31 h 5 min via Anchorage or 44 h 45 min on a seven-stop Lockheed Constellation (1049G model) via India. Air France's ten flights a day to London were almost all Vickers Viscounts; the only other London flight was Alitalia's daily Douglas DC-6B (BEA was at Le Bourget).

A development project voted in 2012 planned to merge the airport's south and west terminals with the construction of an 80,000-square-metre (860,000 sq ft) building to create one great terminal. On 14 April 2016, the Groupe ADP rolled out the Connect 2020 corporate strategy and the commercial brand Paris Aéroport was applied to all Parisian airports, including the Orly airport.

On 7 November 2015, the failure of a two-decade-old Windows 3.1 system which was responsible for communicating visual range information in foggy weather to pilots caused a temporary cease of operations. Whether the failure was hardware- or software-based is not specified, though the highlighting of the operating system suggests a software failure.

As part of the COVID-19 pandemic and its impact on aviation, the airport was closed to all commercial traffic from 1 April 2020 to 25 June 2020. During this period, commercial traffic and flights were relocated to Charles de Gaulle Airport, while Orly was still used for State flights, emergency diversions, and medical evacuations.

Paris Aéroport reported in 2023 that a tree-planting project in the vicinity of the airport, along the route of the route nationale 7, was being undertaken. The scheme involved planting 900 tree species and 14,000 forest seedlings. Paris Aéroport anticipates capturing 329 tonnes of carbon per year through the planting.

In October 2023, it was announced that Air France will largely cease using Orly Airport by summer 2026, with only one public service obligation flight to Corsica to remain.

== Terminals ==
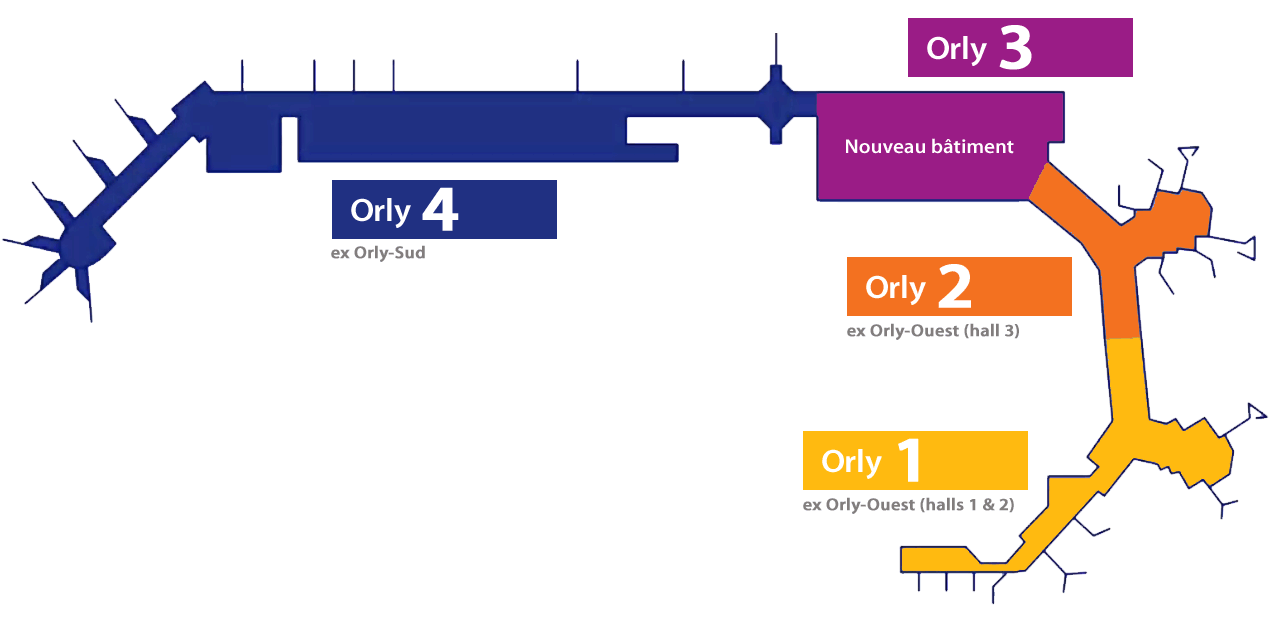
Terminals 1, 2, 3, 4

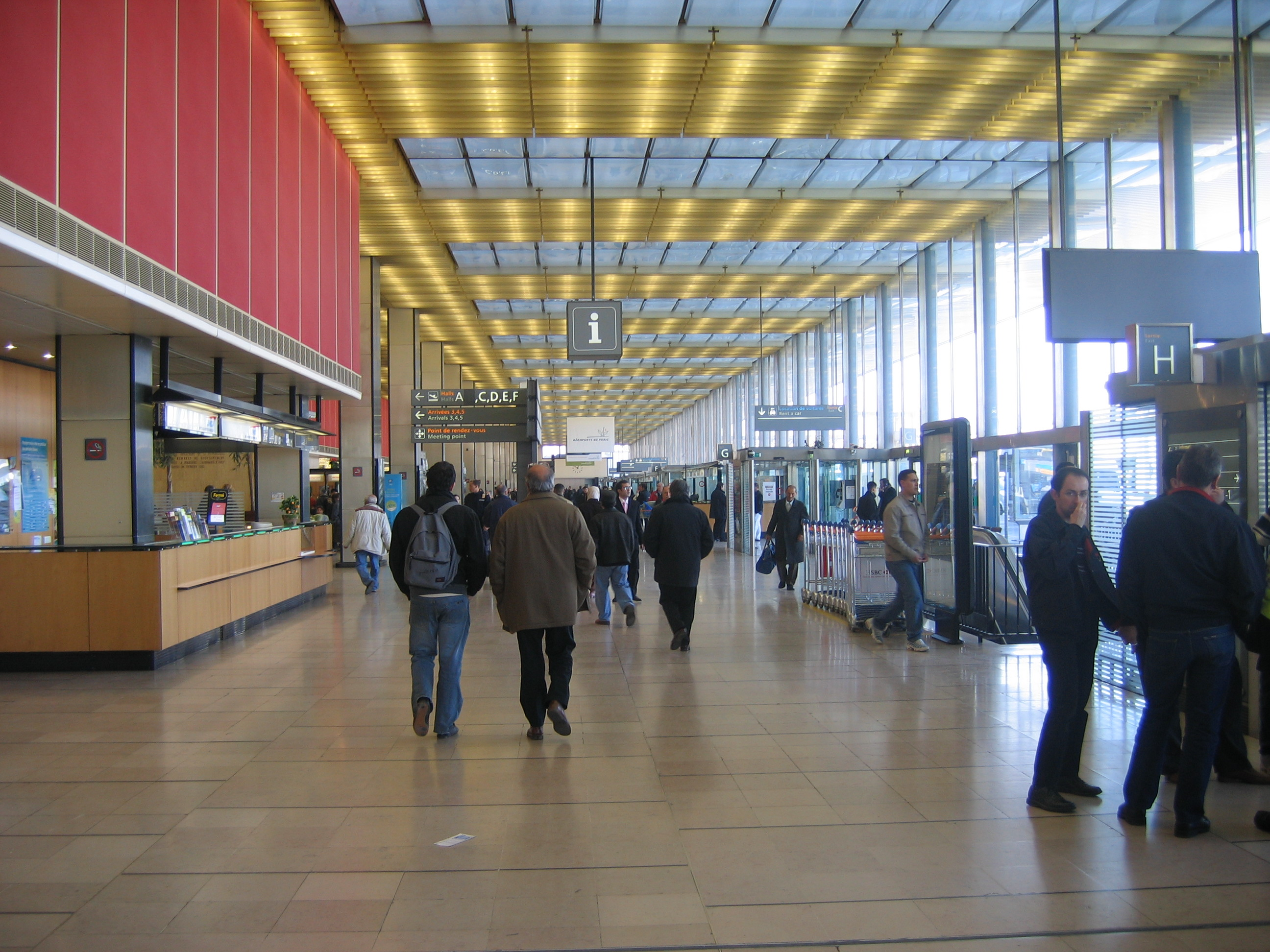
Interior of Terminal 4

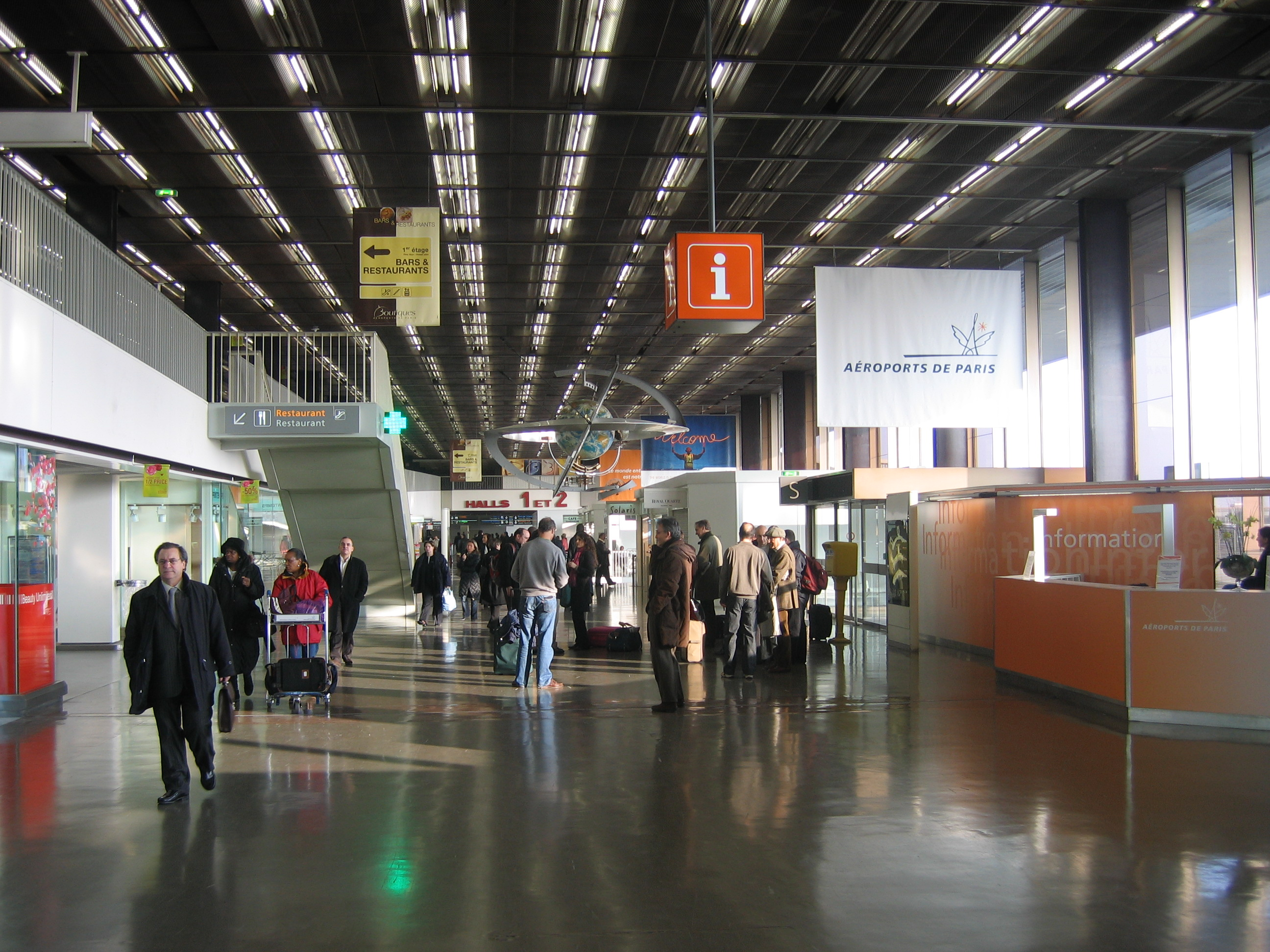
Interior of Terminal 1

=== Terminals 1 and 2 ===
Known as the West Terminal until March 2019, these two terminals consist of two floors and a gate area of four "fingers" rather than a brick-style layout. The ground level 0 features the arrivals facilities including eight baggage reclaim belts as well as several service facilities and shops. The departures area is located on level 1 with more stores and restaurants located here. This central departures area is connected to three gate areas split between Orly 1 (A and B gates) and Orly 2 (C gates). 23 stands at this terminal are equipped with jet-bridges, with several of them also able to handle wide-body aircraft.

=== Terminal 3 ===
Inaugurated in April 2019, Terminal 3 is a junction building between Terminals 1, 2 and 4. The terminal allows customers to travel between all areas of the airport under one roof. It includes around 5,000 m^{2} (54,000 sq ft) of duty-free shopping along with several restaurants and lounges. It houses gates D and E, with direct access to Orly 4 departure gates.

=== Terminal 4 ===
Formerly known as the South Terminal this innovative 1961 steel-and-glass terminal building consists of six floors. While the smaller basement level −1 as well as the upper levels 2, 3 and 4 contain only some service facilities, restaurants and office space, level 0 features the arrivals facilities as well as several shops and service counters. The airside area and departure gates are located on the upper level 1. The waiting area, which features several shops as well, houses gates E and F. 15 of the terminal's departure gates are equipped with jet-bridges, some of which are able to handle wide-body aircraft.

== Airlines and destinations ==
Airlines	Destinations
Air Algérie	Algiers, Annaba, Batna, Béjaïa, Biskra, Constantine, Oran, Setif, Tlemcen
Air Caraïbes	Cancún, Cayenne, Fort-de-France, Pointe-à-Pitre, Port-au-Prince, Punta Cana, Samaná, Santo Domingo–Las Américas, Sint Maarten; Seasonal: San Salvador (Bahamas)
Air Corsica	Ajaccio, Bastia, Calvi, Figari
Air Europa	Madrid; Seasonal: Palma de Mallorca
Air France	Ajaccio, Bastia, Calvi, Figari
Amelia International	Pau
ASL Airlines France	Algiers
Chalair Aviation	Aurillac, Castres, Brive
Corsair International	Abidjan, Antananarivo, Bamako, Cotonou, Dzaoudzi, Fort-de-France, Mauritius, Pointe-à-Pitre, Saint-Denis de la Réunion
easyJet	Bari, Berlin, Catania, Faro, Geneva, Milan–Linate, Milan–Malpensa, Naples, Nice, Pisa, Reykjavík–Keflavík, Rome–Fiumicino, Toulouse, Venice; Seasonal: Athens, Cagliari, Dubrovnik, Lamezia Terme, Olbia, Palermo, Porto, Rhodes, Sofia, Southampton, Split
French Bee	Miami, Montréal–Trudeau, Newark, Papeete, Saint-Denis de la Réunion, San Francisco; Seasonal: Colombo–Bandaranaike (begins 19 December 2026), Los Angeles, Malé (begins 19 December 2026)
Iberia	Madrid
ITA Airways	Milan–Linate
KM Malta Airlines	Malta
La Compagnie	Newark
LOT Polish Airlines	Gdańsk (begins 5 April 2027), Kraków
Pegasus Airlines	Istanbul–Sabiha Gökçen
Royal Air Maroc	Agadir, Casablanca, Dakhla, Fès, Marrakesh, Oujda, Rabat, Tangier
TAP Air Portugal	Lisbon, Porto
Transavia	Agadir, Alghero, Algiers, Alicante, Amsterdam, Athens, Barcelona, Bari, Beirut, Béjaïa, Berlin, Biarritz, Biskra, Cairo, Casablanca, Catania, Constantine, Copenhagen, Dakhla, Djerba, Dublin, Essaouira, Faro, Fuerteventura, Gran Canaria, Heraklion, Istanbul, Jeddah, Lanzarote, Lisbon, Madrid, Málaga, Malta, Marrakesh, Marseille, Medina, Monastir, Montpellier, Munich, Naples, Nice, Oran, Oslo, Ouarzazate, Oujda, Palermo, Palma de Mallorca, Perpignan, Porto, Prague, Praia, Rabat, Reykjavík–Keflavík, Rome–Fiumicino, Sal, Sarajevo, Setif, Seville, Sfax, Sofia, Stockholm–Arlanda, Tallinn, Tangier, Tbilisi, Tel Aviv, Tenerife–South, Thessaloniki, Tlemcen, Toulon, Toulouse, Tozeur, Tunis, Valencia, Venice, Vienna, Wrocław, Yerevan; Seasonal: Antalya, Bodrum, Brindisi, Burgas, Cagliari, Chania, Chișinău, Comiso, Corfu, Dubrovnik, Edinburgh, Errachidia, Hurghada, Ibiza, Ivalo, İzmir, Kalamata, Kefalonia, Kittilä, Kos, Larnaca, Ljubljana, Luleå, Luxor, Menorca, Milan–Malpensa, Mykonos, Olbia, Patras, Pisa, Podgorica, Preveza, Rhodes, Rovaniemi, Santorini, São Vicente, Skiathos, Split, Tirana, Tivat, Tromsø, Varna
Tunisair	Djerba, Monastir, Tunis
Twin Jet	Le Puy
Volotea	Ancona, Genoa, Limoges, Lourdes, Palermo, Rodez, Turin, Verona; Seasonal: Alghero, Olbia
Vueling	Alicante, Asturias, Barcelona, Bilbao, Florence, Fuerteventura, Gran Canaria, Granada, Ibiza, Lanzarote, London–Heathrow, Málaga, Marrakesh, Palma de Mallorca, Santander, Santiago de Compostela, Seville, Tenerife–South, Valencia; Seasonal: Ivalo, Menorca, Reus
Wizz Air	Budapest, Rome–Fiumicino, Warsaw–Chopin

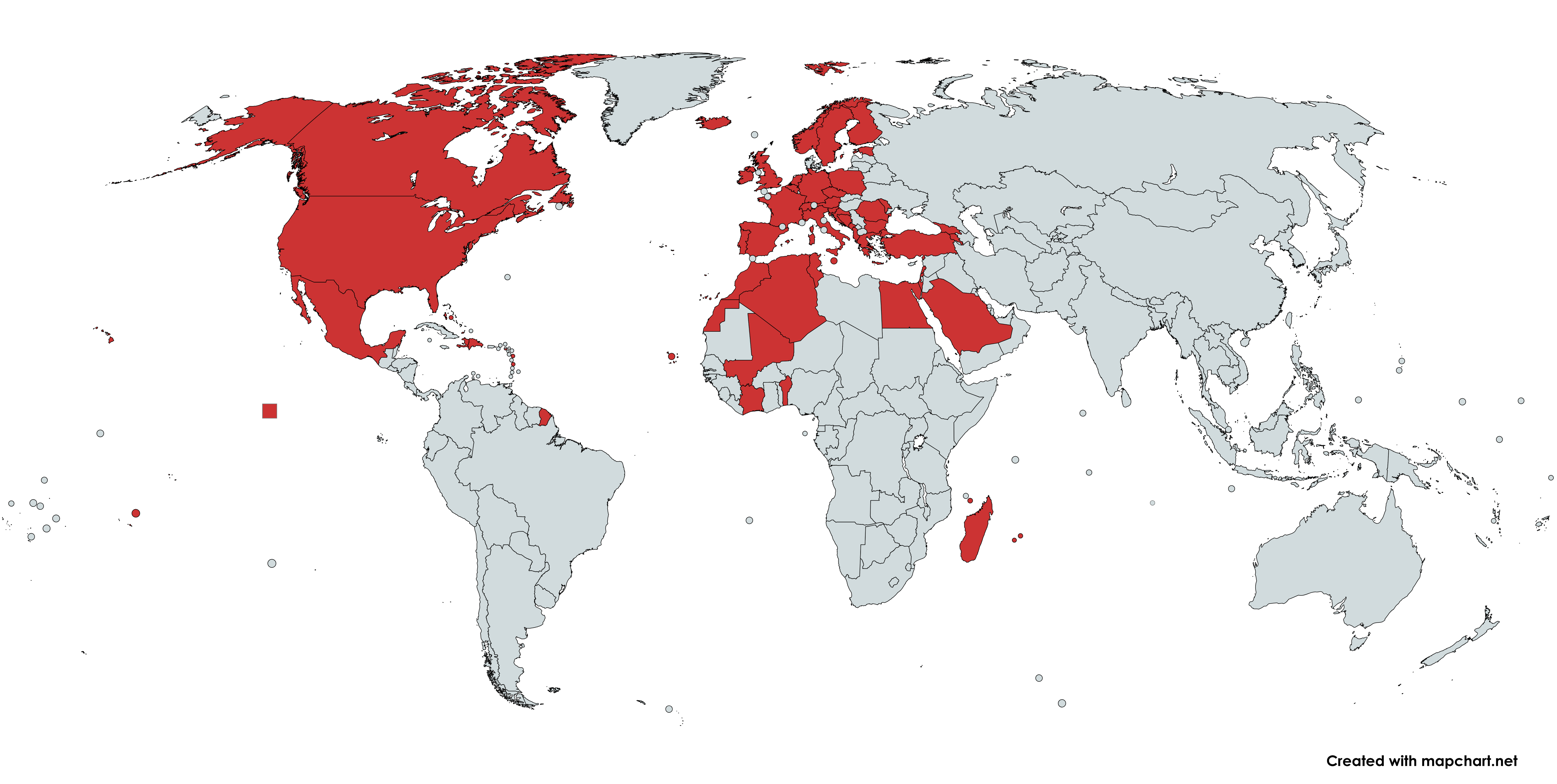
As of september 2026.

== Statistics ==
Busiest international routes from Paris Orly Airport (2024)

Rank	Airport	Passengers
1	Madrid	1,575,331
2	Lisbon	1,528,053
3	Rome Fiumicino	1,178,530
4	Porto	1,127,711
5	Barcelona	1,125,171
6	Algiers	796,128
7	Marrakech	776,902
8	Tunis	744,726
9	Casablanca	632,911
10	Malaga	511,503

Busiest domestic routes from Paris Orly Airport (2024)

Rank	Airport	Passengers
1	Nice	1,600,457
2	Toulouse	1,276,245
3	Pointe-à-Pitre	1,096,019
4	Saint-Denis de la Réunion	983,463
5	Fort-de-France	953,658
6	Ajaccio	482,568
7	Bastia	467,192
8	Marseille	380,576
9	Perpignan	240,000
10	Montpellier	233,084

== Other facilities ==
AOM French Airlines had its head office in Orly Airport Building 363 in Paray-Vieille-Poste. After AOM and Air Liberté merged in 2001, the new airline, Air Lib, occupied building 363.

== Ground transportation ==
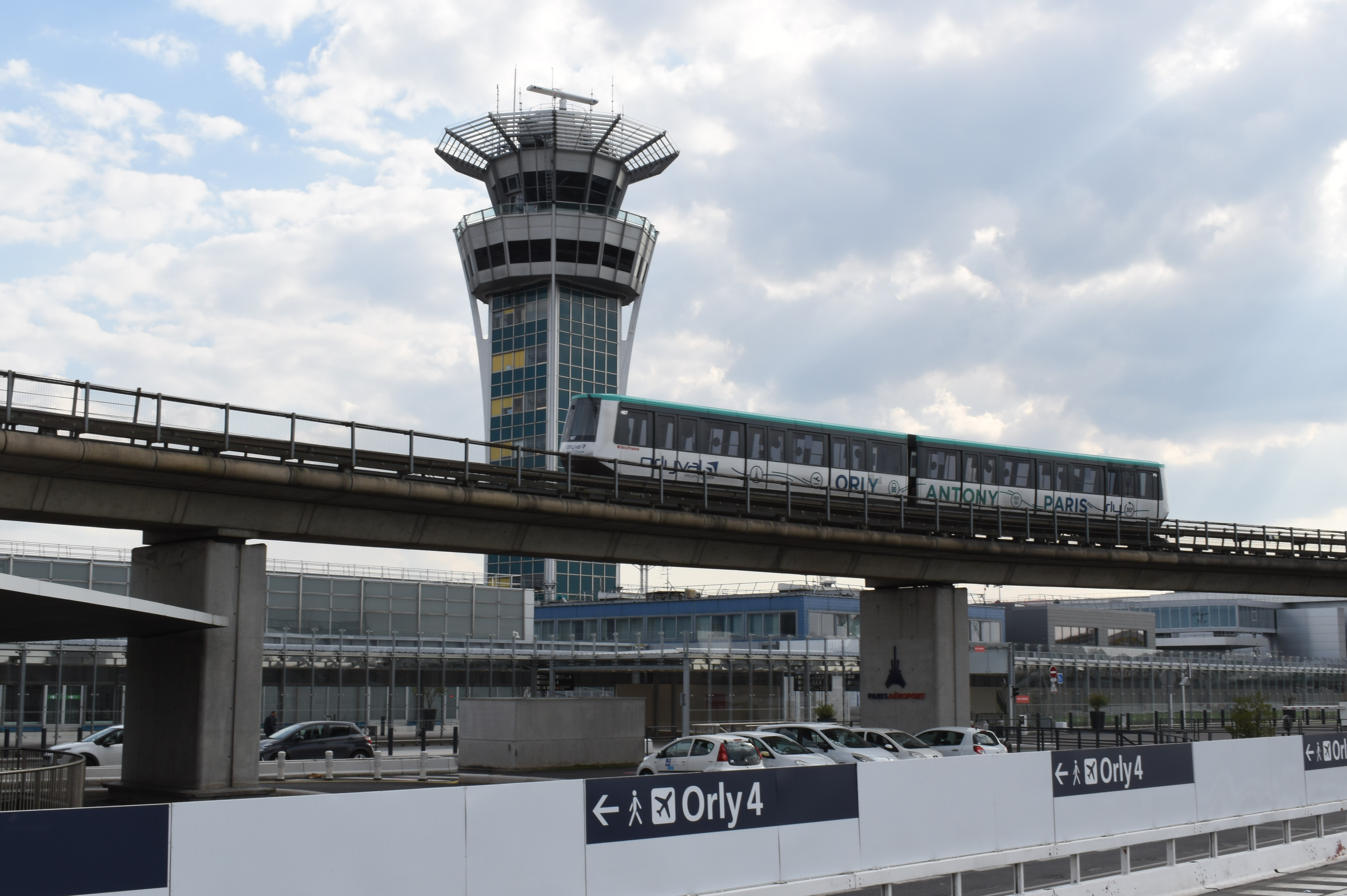
Orlyval in front of the airport's air traffic control tower

=== Train ===
Orly Airport is directly served by one metro line, a tram line and a people mover, which offer connections to the larger Paris transportation network:

- Paris Métro Line 14 links the airport with central Paris and Saint-Denis, with a journey time of 25 minutes to Châtelet–Les Halles station
- Tramway T7 connects to Terminal 4, and offers service to Villejuif–Louis Aragon station on Paris Métro Line 7.
- Orlyval people mover line that connects two stations at Orly terminals (Orly 1, 2, 3 station and Orly 4 station) with Antony station, served by the RER B line. Passengers can also transfer to Tramway T7 at Orly 4 station. Orlyval is free to use between the two stations at Orly; however a premium fare is charged between Antony and Orly Airport (the suburb of Antony is about 5 km from the airport).

As part of the Grand Paris Express project, Aéroport d'Orly station on the metro opened on 24 June 2024. It is by a new extension of Line 14, linking the airport directly to Paris. From 2027, the station will also be served by Line 18, connecting the airport to Massy-Palaiseau and Paris-Saclay.

=== Car ===
Orly Airport is connected to the A106 autoroute (spur of the A6 autoroute).

=== Buses and coaches ===
- Disneyland Magical Shuttle direct to Disneyland Paris
- RATP bus 183 to Rungis International Market via Pont de Rungis–Aéroport d'Orly station (connection to RER C) and Robert Peary station (connection to Tramway T9)
- Albatrans bus 91–10 to Saint-Quentin-en-Yvelines–Montigny-le-Bretonneux station (connection to Transilien) via Massy-Palaiseau station (connection to TGV)
- Noctilien night buses:
  - N22 to Paris (Châtelet–Les Halles station)
  - N31 to Paris (Gare de Lyon)
  - N131 to Paris (Gare de Lyon) via Brétigny station
  - N144 to Paris (Gare de l'Est) via Corbeil-Essonnes

== Accidents and incidents ==
- On 10 February 1948, SNCASE Languedoc P/7 F-BATH of Air France was damaged beyond economical repair at Orly Airport.
- On 20 September 1952, a USAF Douglas C-47 Skytrain on final approach to ORY struck a telephone pole, rooftops and crashed and caught fire 1 km (0.6 mi) from ORY. Three of the four occupants on board died.
- On 27 November 1953, a USAF Fairchild C-119 Flying Boxcar crashed 4 km (2.5 mi) NE of ORY on approach, crashing in flames in the Cholsy-le-Roy neighborhood of Paris. The cause was the rear clam shell doors broke off striking the horizontal stabilizer, causing a catastrophic failure of the empennage. All six occupants were killed.
- On 24 November 1956, Linee Aeree Italiane Flight 451, a Douglas DC-6 crashed 0.6 km (0.4 mi) W of ORY moments after takeoff, some 10–15 seconds later altitude was lost and the DC-6 struck a house 600 m past the runway end. All 10 crew and 34 of the 35 passengers were killed. Cause unknown.
- On 21 January 1957, a SNCASE Armagnac crashed attempting to land at night with instrument landing system monitored by GCA. One crewmember and one passenger out of the 70 on board died.
- On 19 May 1960, an Air Algérie Sud Aviation Caravelle collided with a Stampe SV.4 biplane on final approach about 8 miles SE of Orly. Despite suffering substantial damage, the Caravelle landed safely at Orly with only one fatality but the Stampe biplane crashed, killing the pilot.
- On 3 June 1962, Air France Flight 007, a chartered Boeing 707 named the Chateau de Sully bound for Atlanta, US, crashed on take-off with 132 people on board; 130 of them were killed. The only survivors were two flight attendants seated in the rear of the plane. The charter flight was carrying home Atlanta's civic and cultural leaders of the day. At the time, this was the highest recorded death toll for an incident involving a single aircraft.
- On 11 July 1973, Varig Flight 820, a Boeing 707, made a forced landing due to fire in a rear lavatory, incoming from Rio de Janeiro–Galeão. The aircraft landed 5 kilometers short of the runway, in a full-flap and gear down configuration. Due mainly to smoke inhalation, there were 123 deaths whilst 11 people survived (10 crew, one passenger).
- On 3 March 1974, Turkish Airlines Flight 981, in an event known as the "Ermenonville air disaster", crashed in Ermenonville forest after take-off from Orly on a flight to London's Heathrow Airport when an improperly closed cargo door burst open. The explosive decompression that resulted brought down the McDonnell Douglas DC-10. All 346 people on board were killed, making the accident one of the deadliest in aviation history.
- On 20 October 2022, Amelia International Flight 8R1217, an Embraer ERJ 145, suffered damage after skidding off the runway 25 whilst landing during a storm by night. None of the 42 people on board were injured.

=== Non-aircraft related ===
- On 13 and 19 January 1975, a series of RPG attacks by Popular Front for the Liberation of Palestine caused collateral damage and injured 23.
- On 30 September 1977, an Air Inter Sud Aviation Caravelle was hijacked by a man armed with a pistol and a hand grenade and returned to Orly Airport. After about eight hours police marksman fired tear gas grenades and stormed the plane. The hijacker lobbed a hand grenade toward the cockpit, killing one passenger. A shot was fired and the hijacker was arrested.
- On 20 May 1978, three terrorists armed with submachine guns opened fire at the El Al boarding gate, killing five and injuring five.
- On 15 July 1983, a bombing of a Turkish Airlines check-in counter by ASALA killed eight people and injured 55.
- On 18 March 2017, a man attempted to grab the gun of a soldier who was patrolling the airport as part of Opération Sentinelle. The attacker was shot and killed.

== Sources ==
- McAuliffe, Jerome J.: U.S. Air Force in France 1950–1967 (2005), Chapter 14, "Paris-USAF Operations".
