= Les Baconnets station =

Railway station in Antony, France

Les Baconnets
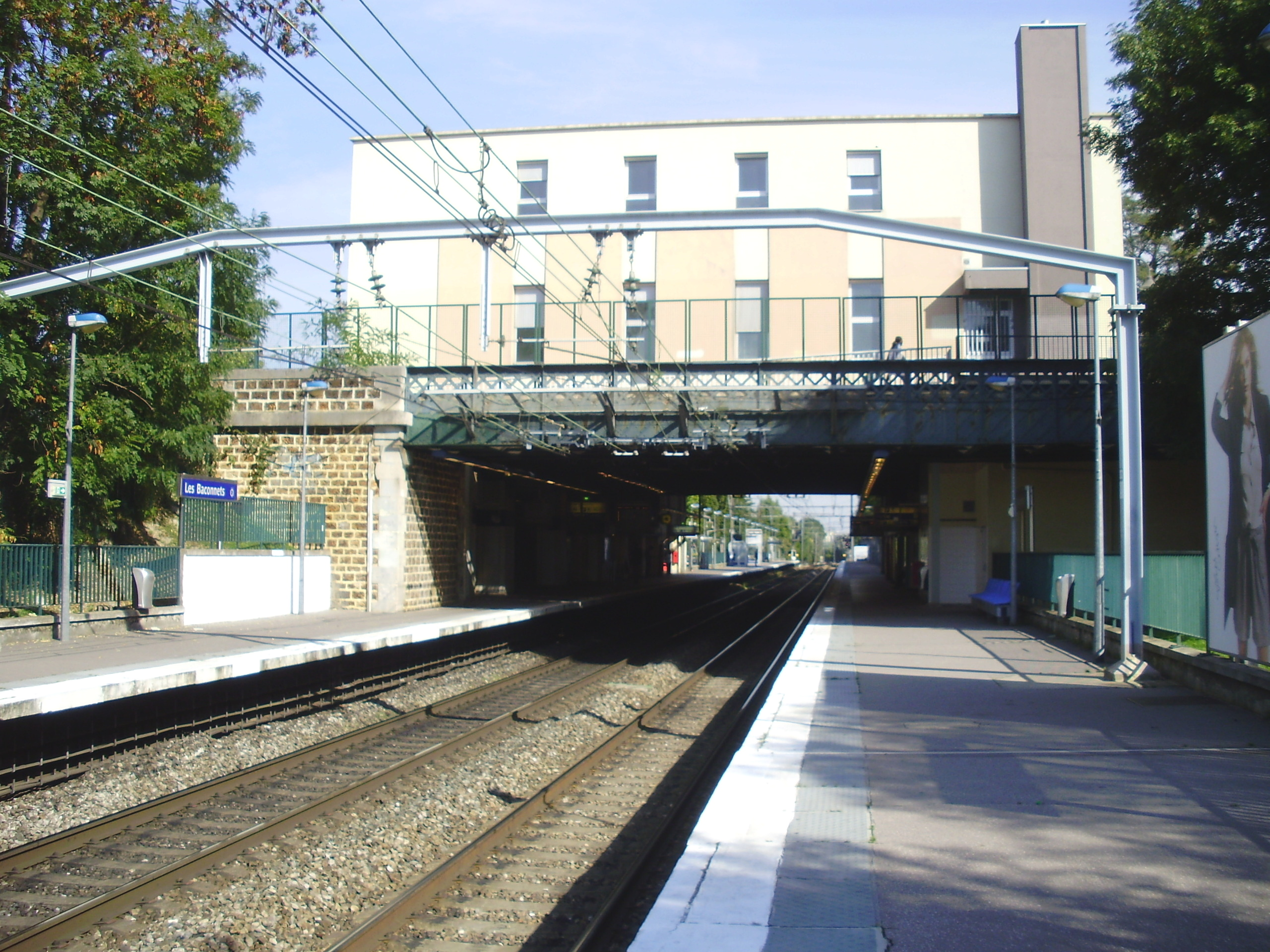
- Les Baconnets station platforms

General information
- Location: France
- Coordinates: 48°44′22″N 2°17′15″E
- Operator: RATP Group
- Line: Ligne de Sceaux
- Platforms: 2 side platforms
- Tracks: 2

Construction
- Structure type: Below-grade
- Accessible: Yes, by request to staff

Other information
- Station code: 87758771
- Fare zone: 4

Services
Preceding station	RER	Following station
Fontaine-Michalon towards Aéroport Charles de Gaulle 2 TGV or Mitry–Claye	RER B	Massy–Verrières towards Saint-Rémy-lès-Chevreuse
Location

Les Baconnets station is a Paris RER station. It is one of the stations for Antony, Hauts-de-Seine, and for parts of Massy, Île-de-France.
