= Orly 1, 2, 3 station =

Railway station in France

Orly 1, 2, 3
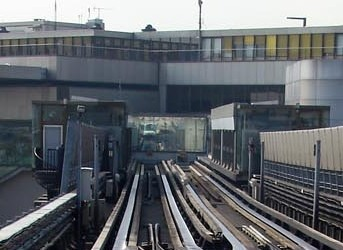
- Orly 1, 2, 3 station

General information
- Location: Orly Airport Terminal 1 Paray-Vieille-Poste; France
- Coordinates: 48°43′47″N 2°21′36″E
- Owner: RATP Group
- Platforms: 2 side platforms
- Tracks: 2
- Connections: at Aéroport d'Orly; Noctilien: N131

Construction
- Structure type: Elevated
- Accessible: Yes

History
- Opened: 2 October 1991
- Former names: Orly – Ouest

Services
Preceding station	Transport in Paris	Following station
Antony Terminus	Orlyval	Orly 4 Terminus
Location

Orly 1, 2, 3 station is an Orlyval station serving Terminals 1, 2, and 3 of Orly Airport. The station in the northern part of the Orly terminal area closest to the Orly 1 gates. It was previously called Orly – Ouest under the airport's previous terminal naming scheme.

From Orly 1, 2, 3 station, passengers can travel to Orly 4 station for free. Passengers traveling to Antony station, the connection point to RER B trains to Paris, must pay a premium fare at the exit fare gates before exiting the Orlyval system.

Because the station has two dead-end bay platforms, Orlyval trains enter the station head first, and reverse out.

== See also ==
- List of stations of the Paris RER
- List of stations of the Paris Métro
