= Orlyval =

Airport light rail and shuttle service in France

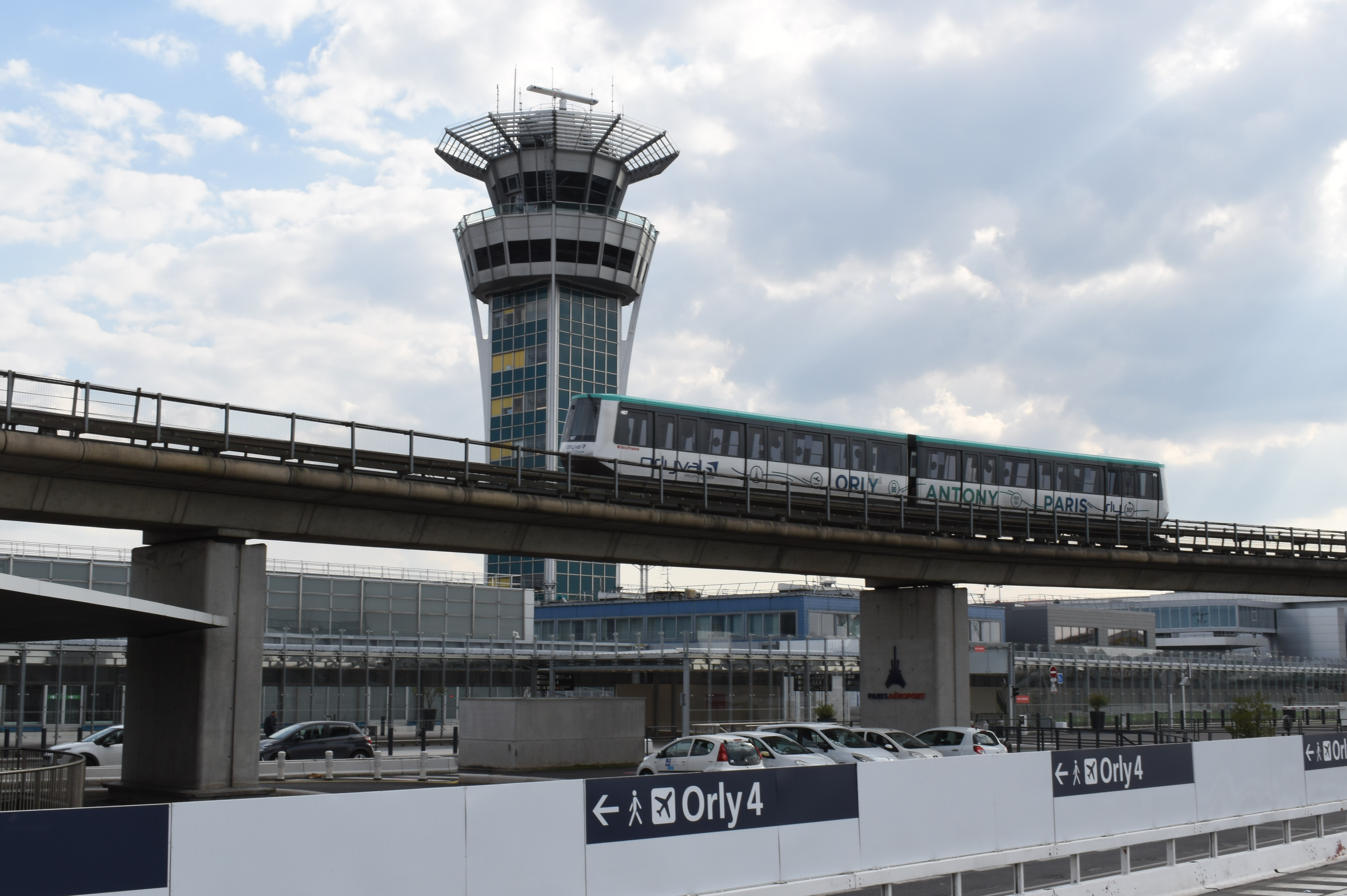
- Orlyval train passing Orly Airport control tower in 2021

Overview
- Stations: 3
- Website: orlyval.com

Service
- Type: Light metro
- Operator: RATP Group
- Rolling stock: VAL 206
- Ridership: 3,100,000 (annual, 2013)

History
- Opened: 2 October 1991

Technical
- Line length: 7.3 km (4.5 mi)
Route map
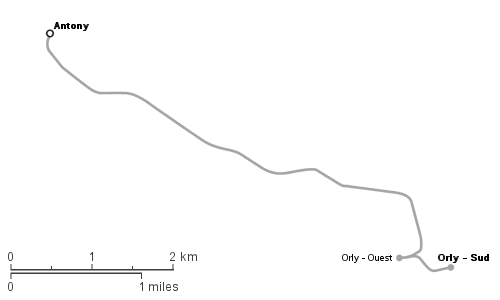
- (*) Under construction

Orlyval (French: [ɔʁlival]) is a light metro shuttle service at Paris's Orly Airport using the Véhicule Automatique Léger (VAL, English: automatic light vehicle) driverless, rubber-tyred people mover technology. The line, which opened on 2 October 1991, offers free service between the two airport terminal stations, and premium fare service to Antony station, where passengers can connect to the city's RER B trains. Orlyval is the second line to use the VAL technology after the Lille Metro and the first airport people mover system to use VAL.

The line was financed and initially operated by private companies including Matra, the company that developed the VAL technology, along with several international developers. The line was a commercial failure and the operators went bankrupt. RATP Group, the transportation operator for the Paris region, took over the line in 1992.

Following the extension of Paris Metro line 14 to Orly Airport in June 2024, the future of the line is currently being considered by Île-de-France Mobilités.

== History ==
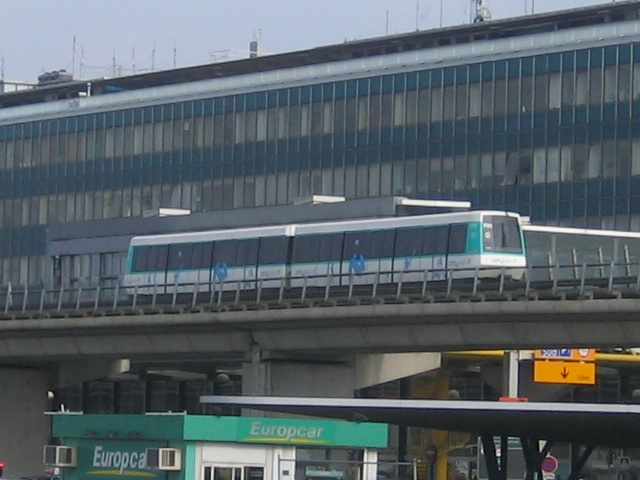
An Orlyval shuttle arriving at Orly 4

Orly Airport is the primary airport for domestic flights between Paris and other cities in France. During the 1980s, the only transportation options to the airport were by road. Bus routes to the airport were often crowded and traffic jams were frequent.

Several projects were suggested: an extension of Paris Métro Line 7, an additional branch of the RER B, and an extension of the RER C. Ultimately, in December 1987, authorities opted for the construction of a shuttle line from the airport to Antony station on the RER B line using the Véhicule Automatique Léger (VAL) technology developed by Matra for the Lille Metro which opened in 1983. The project was seen (and criticized) as a showcase project for Matra who was hoping to sell VAL systems to cities across the world.

The government of Jacques Chirac was skeptical about financing the shuttle line and instead offered up a concession: the right for a private company to operate the shuttle line on the airport grounds. A consortium was formed to build the line, consisting of the domestic airline Air Inter (26.7% share), builder Lyonnaise des Eaux-Dumez (18% share), VAL manufacturer Matra (17.3% share), and public transport operator RATP (3.3% share). The other 34.7% of the consortium was owned by several banks including Caisse des Dépôts, Crédit Lyonnais, and Indosuez. With daily ridership forecasted at over 14,000 passengers, the banks helped the group secure loans worth 1.55 billion french francs (about €21.65 million).

The Orlyval opened on 2 October 1991, about three months ahead of schedule. Almost immediately, ridership was lower than expected. Blame was placed on the premium fare, 55 francs (about €8), and the transfer between VAL and RER trains at Antony station. Daily ridership was around 4,500, only a third of the predicted traffic. After a few months of operation, fares were reduced, but ridership remained low. In the first full year of operation, the line only served 1.2 million travelers, instead of the 4.3 million initially forecasted. In December 1992, the line was put into compulsory liquidation.

Operation of the line was taken over by RATP, who would receive an operating subsidy of ten million francs per year until the end of 2021, paid by the Île-de-France region. The settlement also included the requirement that until the end of 2021, a portion of each fare should go to repaying creditors, expected to return about 67% of their original investment. Because of this agreement, fares on the line remained higher than other forms of transportation in the region. As of the end of 2016, the line generated about 10.5 million euros in fares per year.

Ridership increased after the RATP took over operation of the line. The RATP carried out a study of riders in early 1994 and learned the clientele mostly consisted of businessmen traveling between the city and the airport for professional reasons. As a result of the study, in June 1994, RATP increased operating hours of the Orlyval to enable connections to the first and last domestic flights. Since the 2000s, traffic has experienced an annual increase of 8 to 10%. Ridership for the year 2013 amounted to 3.1 million trips.

In June 2024, Paris Metro line 14 was extended to Orly Airport with the opening of Aéroport d'Orly station, shortly before the start of the 2024 Summer Olympics and 2024 Summer Paralympics. This offered a faster and cheaper route to central Paris without needing to change trains. By October 2024, ridership on Orlyval and Orlybus had fallen by around 70%.

== Stations ==
Station	Facilities
Antony	RER RER B
Orly 1, 2, 3	Terminals 1, 2 and 3 at Aéroport d'Orly
Orly 4	Terminal 4

Interchanges with RER and metro

== Fares ==
Travel between the airport's terminals is free of charge. Travel between the airport's terminals and Antony station is charged. There are no fare gates at the airport's terminals. There are fare gates at Antony station.

An Airports Ticket costs €14 for adults and €7 for children ages 4-10. The fare is valid for Métro, Transilien, RER and Orlyval journeys, up to 120 minutes, including all connections inside the network and some connections outside the network. The fare is valid for journeys to and from the airports. The fare can be validated with a Navigo Easy Travel Card, or a Navigo on Smartphone.

A Paris Visite Pass costs €30.60 for one day, €45.40 for two days, €63.80 for three days or €78 for five days. The fare is valid for Métro, Transilien, RER, Orlyval, Bus, Tram, Funicular and Cable journeys. The fare is valid for one day (not the next 24 hours), two days (not the next 48 hours), three days (not the next 72 hours) or five days (not the next 120 hours) and is obtainable in advance. The fare is valid for journeys to and from the airports. The fare can be validated with a Navigo Easy Travel Card, or a Navigo on Smartphone.

== Future ==
Orlyval faces an uncertain future. In 2024, Paris Metro Line 14 was extended from Olympiades to Orly Airport. In 2028, Paris Metro Line 18 will open between Massy-Palaiseau and Orly Airport.

As of October 2024, Île-de-France Mobilités is considering options on the future of the line. The first option would be the modernisation of the line with three additional stations built to serve the local community (around €290 million) – this is being lobbied for by the towns of Antony and Wissous as well as the Paris-Saclay community. The second option would be the truncation of the line to serve as an internal shuttle between Orly 1, 2, 3 and Orly 4 – this is being lobbied for by the airport's operator Groupe ADP. The third option would be the dismantling of the line with possible reuse of the right of way as a cycle path or bus lane (around €150 million).

== See also ==
- CDGVAL
- List of metro systems
