= Orly 4 station =

Railway station in France

Orly 4
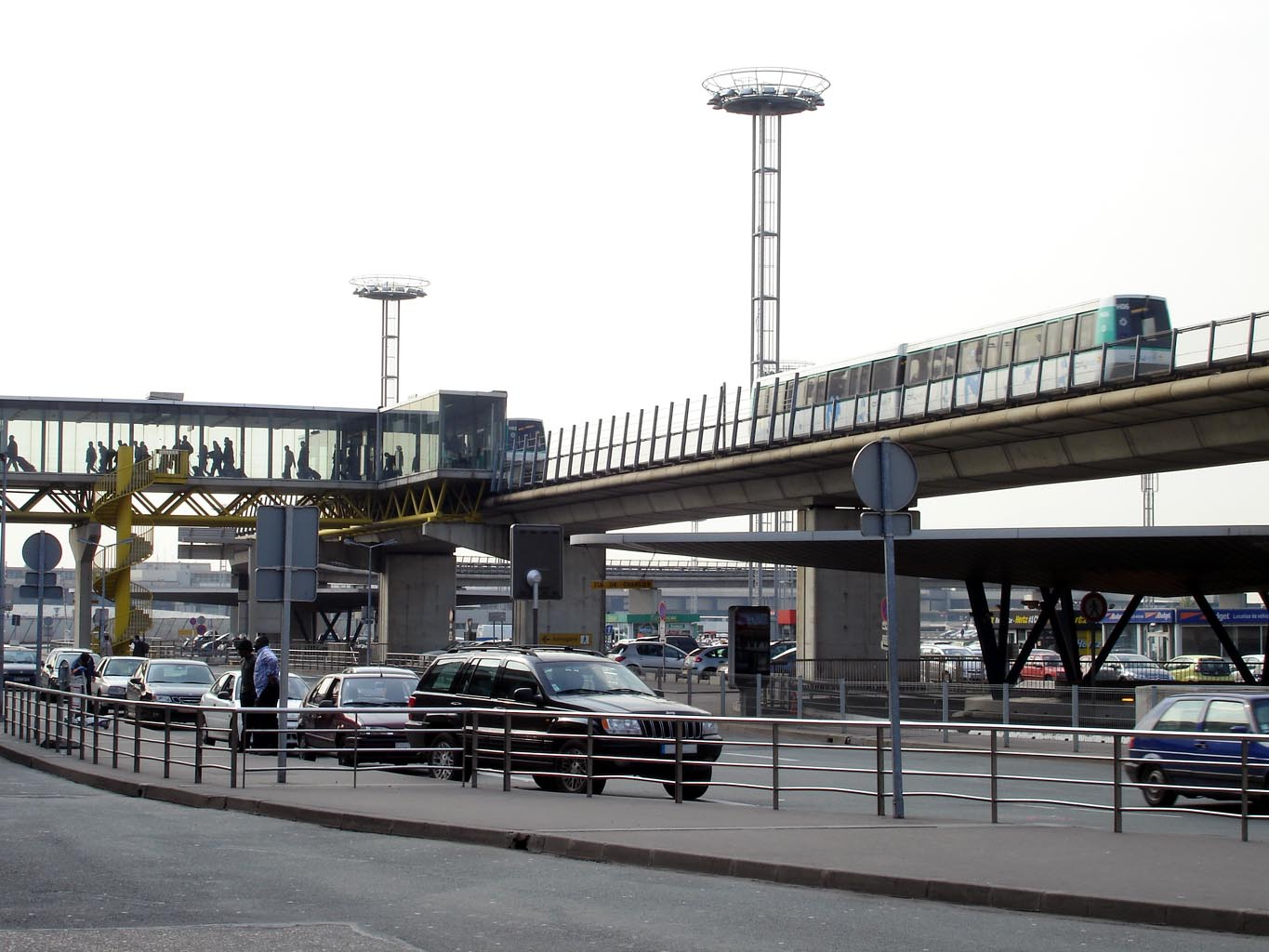
- Orlyval train arrives at Orly 4 station

General information
- Location: Orly Airport Terminal 4 Paray-Vieille-Poste; France
- Coordinates: 48°43′44″N 2°22′12″E
- Owner: RATP Group
- Platforms: 2 side platforms
- Tracks: 2
- Connections: RATP Bus: 183; Noctilien: N22 N31 N131 N134

Construction
- Structure type: Elevated
- Accessible: Yes

History
- Opened: 2 October 1991
- Former names: Orly – Sud

Services
Preceding station	Transport in Paris	Following station
Orly 1, 2, 3 towards Antony	Orlyval	Terminus
Location

Orly 4 station is an Orlyval station in front of Terminal 4 of Orly Airport. It was previously called Orly – Sud under the airport's previous terminal naming scheme. It consists of two half stations on a viaduct that runs along the northern facade of the terminal. The access is through Gate K in the baggage claim area.

The station is located near the Aéroport d'Orly stop on Île-de-France tramway Line 7.

From Orly 4 station, passengers can travel to Orly 1, 2, 3 station for free. Passengers traveling to Antony station, the connection point to RER B trains to Paris, must pay a premium fare at the exit fare gates before exiting the Orlyval system.

== See also ==
- List of stations of the Paris RER
- List of stations of the Paris Métro
