= Île-de-France tramway Line 10 =

Suburban tram line in Hauts-de-Seine, southwest of Paris

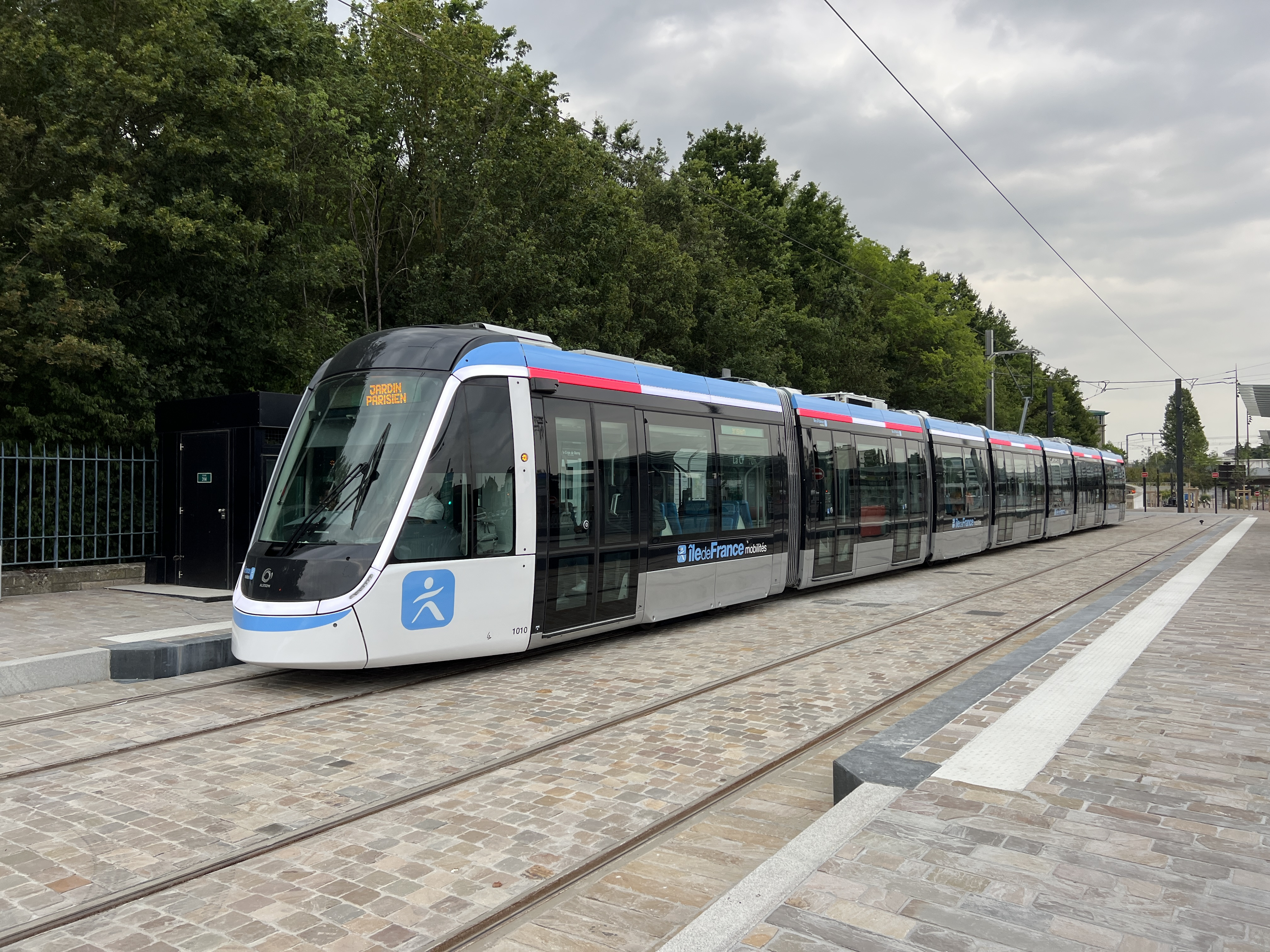
- Île-de-France tramway Line 10 at La Croix de Berny

Overview
- Owner: Île-de-France Mobilités
- Termini: Jardin Parisien; La Croix de Berny
- Stations: 13

Service
- Type: Tram
- System: Tramways in Île-de-France
- Operator: RATP Group
- Rolling stock: 13 Alstom Citadis X05

History
- Opened: 24 June 2023

Technical
- Line length: 6.8 km (4.2 mi)
- Track gauge: 1,435 mm (4 ft 8 1/2 in) standard gauge
Route map
- (*) Under construction

Île-de-France tramway Line 10 (T10; French: Ligne 10 du tramway d'Île-de-France, known in the planning phase as the Tramway Antony – Clamart, TAC) is a tram line which is a part of the modern tram network of the Île-de-France region of France. The line connects Clamart and La Croix de Berny Paris RER station, serving suburbs southwest of Paris. It has a length of 6.8 km (4.2 mi) and 13 stations, opening on 24 June 2023. A final section further north in Clamart is to be formally approved at a later date.

== Operations ==
The entire line is accessible, with all stations equipped with ramps for people with reduced mobility and strollers. The stations are also well-equipped, with information panels showing waiting times, automatic ticket dispensers and video surveillance systems.

The 13 Alstom Citadis X05 trams, with 74 seats per car, are capable of carrying up to 314 people. The cars are equipped with air conditioning and USB charging stations.

In 2021, Île-de-France Mobilités awarded RATP Group an eight year contract to operate the line.

== Northern extension ==
The line is to be extended north to Clamart station by 2032. The extension route is currently under study.
