= La Croix de Berny station =

Railway station in Antony, France

La Croix de Berny
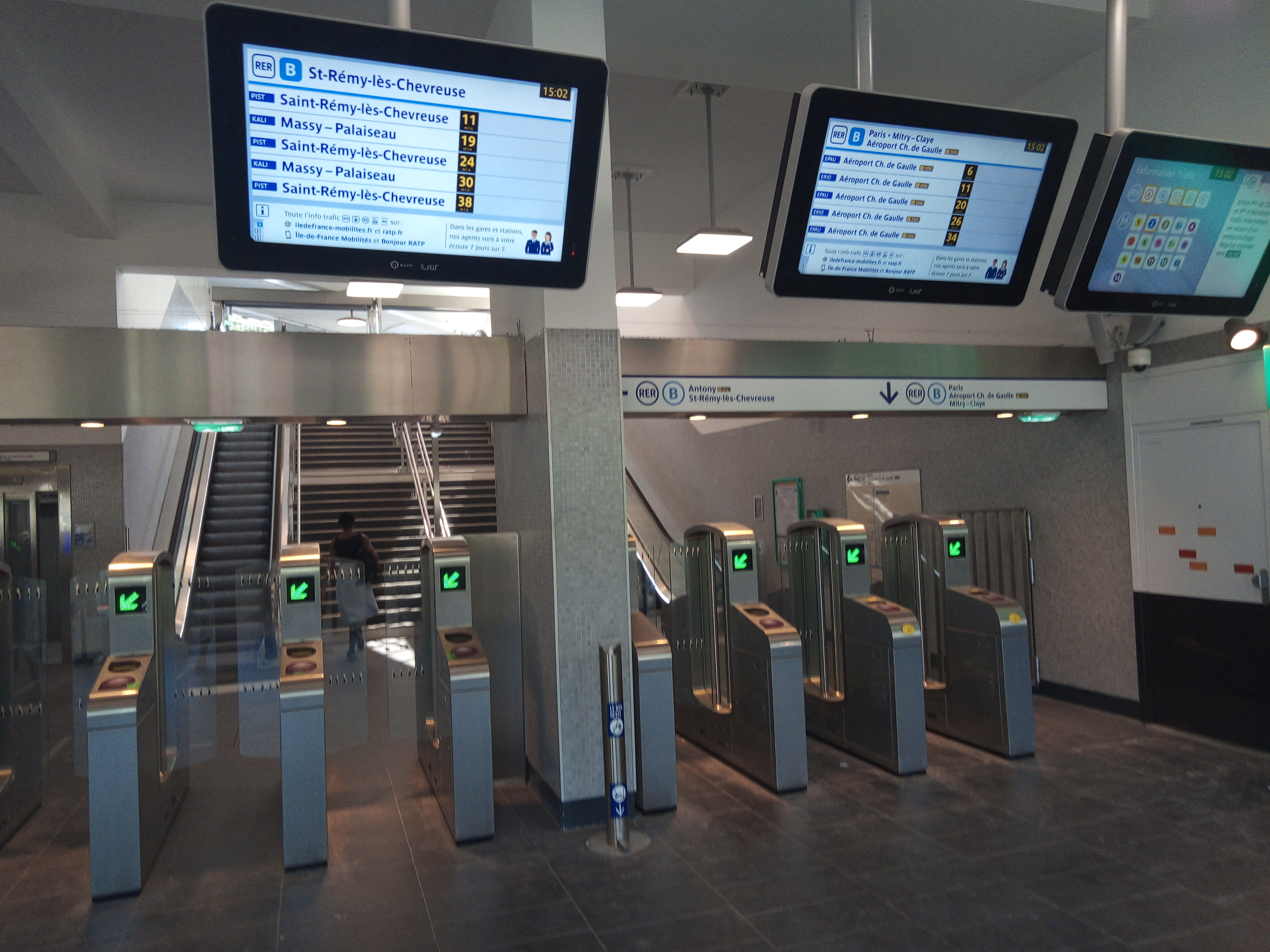
- La Croix de Berny station entrance, opened in 2021

General information
- Location: Antony; France
- Coordinates: 48°45′45″N 2°18′17″E
- Operator: RATP Group
- Line: Ligne de Sceaux
- Platforms: 2 side platforms
- Tracks: 2
- Connections: RATP Bus: Tvm

Construction
- Structure type: Embankment
- Accessible: Yes, by request to staff

Other information
- Station code: 87758748
- Fare zone: 3

History
- Opened: 29 July 1854

Passengers
- 2019: 3,161,602

Services
Preceding station	RER	Following station
Parc de Sceaux towards Aéroport Charles de Gaulle 2 TGV or Mitry–Claye	RER B	Antony towards Saint-Rémy-lès-Chevreuse
Location

La Croix de Berny (French pronunciation: [la kʁwa də bɛʁni]) is a station on the RER B line in Antony, near Sceaux. It also serves as the terminus of tramway line T10 towards Clamart opened in 2023, and of the bus rapid transit line TVM (Trans Val de Marne) to Créteil which opened in 2007. The station is close to the Parc de Sceaux.

A full renovation of the station with a budget of 20.5 million euro finished in 2021, consisting of a new station building, a new underpass, and accessibility improvements.

== See also ==
- List of stations of the Paris RER
