= Gare du Nord (Paris Metro) =

Metro station in Paris, France

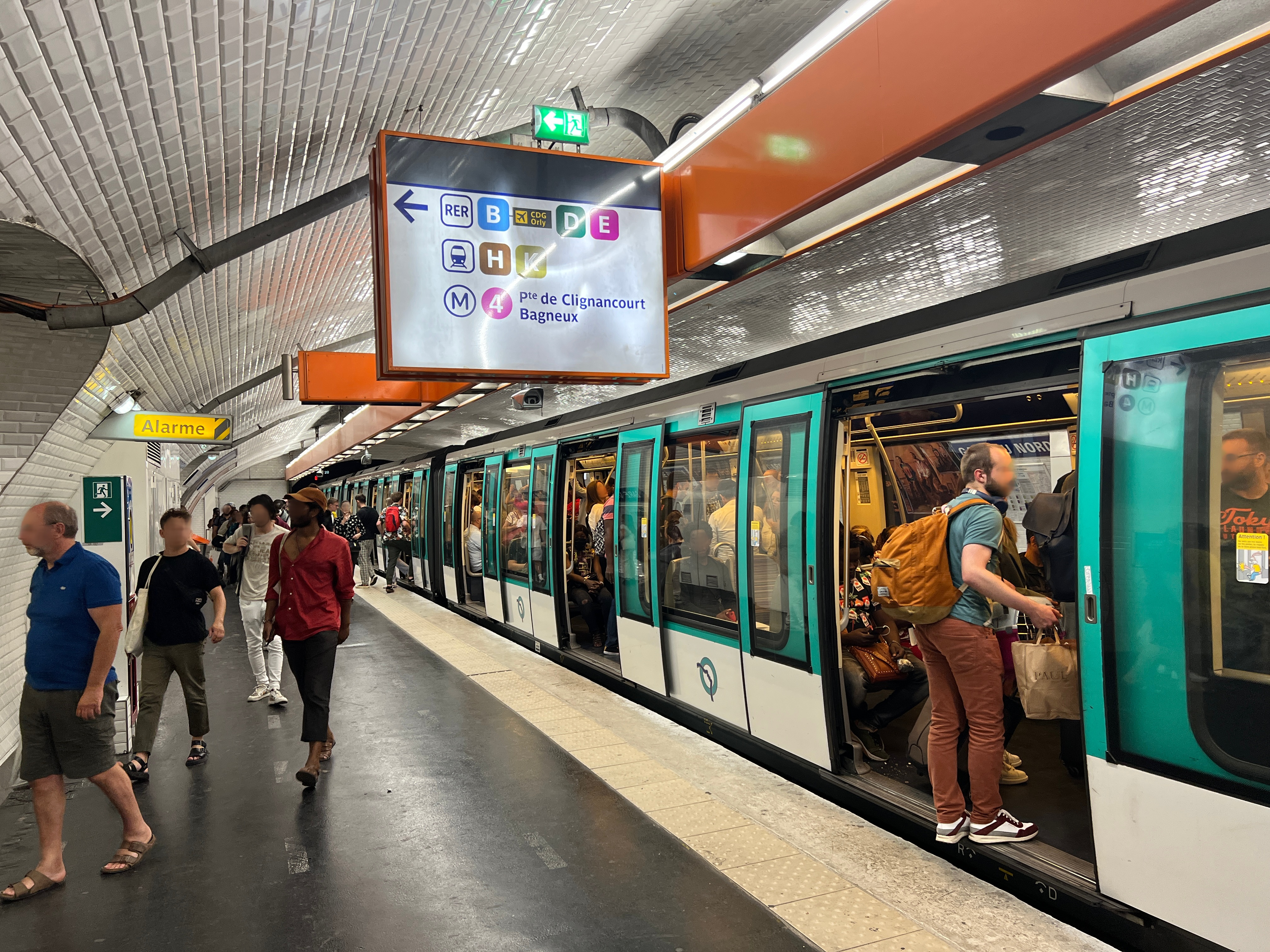
- Line 5 platforms with a MF 01 rolling stock

General information
- Location: 9, Boul. Denain; 17, Rue de Dunkerque; 18, Rue de Dunkerque; Gare du Nord; 10th arrondissement of Paris; Île-de-France; France
- Coordinates: 48°52′50″N 2°21′18″E
- Owner: RATP
- Operator: RATP

Other information
- Fare zone: 1

History
- Opened: 15 November 1907; 118 years ago

Passengers
- 2021: 34,503,097

Services
Preceding station	Paris Metro	Following station
Gare de l'Est towards Bagneux–Lucie Aubrac	Line 4	Barbès–Rochechouart towards Porte de Clignancourt
Gare de l'Est towards Place d'Italie	Line 5	Stalingrad towards Bobigny–Pablo Picasso
Connections to other stations
Preceding station	Paris Metro	Following station
Barbès–Rochechouart towards Porte Dauphine	Line 2 transfer at La Chapelle	Stalingrad towards Nation
Preceding station	RER	Following station
La Plaine Stade de France towards Aéroport Charles de Gaulle 2 TGV or Mitry–Claye	RER B transfer at Gare du Nord	Châtelet towards Robinson or Saint-Rémy-lès-Chevreuse
Stade de France–Saint-Denis towards Creil	RER D transfer at Gare du Nord	Châtelet towards Corbeil-Essonnes
Stade de France–Saint-Denis towards Goussainville	RER D transfer at Gare du Nord	Châtelet towards Melun
Haussmann–Saint-Lazare towards Nanterre–La Folie	RER E transfer at Magenta	Pantin towards Chelles–Gournay or Tournan
Location
- Location within Paris

Gare du Nord (French: [ɡaʁ dy nɔʁ]) is a station on Line 4 and Line 5 of the Paris Métro. It is the busiest station in the system (not including RER stations), with 48 million entrances a year. It is connected to the SNCF railway station Gare du Nord (literally, "North Station", until 1938 run by the well-known company Chemins de Fer du Nord), which is served by RER B, RER D and Transilien Nord commuter trains as well as interurban trains to northern France, Eurostar trains to London and Thalys trains to Brussels, Amsterdam and Cologne. The station is also connected to the La Chapelle Métro station on Line 2 and to the Magenta RER station on RER E.

== History ==
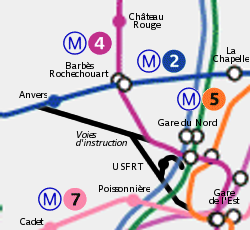
Training line shown in black

On 15 November 1907, Line 5 was extended from Gare d'Orléans (now known as Gare d'Austerlitz) to Gare du Nord where the station was built on a reversing loop. On 21 April 1908, Line 4 was opened from Châtelet to Porte de Clignancourt through Gare du Nord.

On 5 October 1942, the old Line 5 station was closed and replaced with a through station on 12 October 1942, in preparation for the extension to Église de Pantin. The part of the old loop that was not destroyed during the building of RER B in the 1970s, together with connecting lines to Line 2 and Line 4 under the Boulevard de Magenta and Rue de Dunkerque, are now used for driver training (USFRT). The length of platforms on Line 4 were extended from 75 to 90 metres (246 to 295 ft) in the 1960s during the upgrading of the line for rubber-tyre operations.

On 10 December 1981, the RER B station at Gare du Nord opened. The RER D station opened on 27 September 1987 with the rest of the line, while Gare de Magenta on the RER E line opened on 14 July 1999. The Church of Saint-Vincent-de-Paul is located nearby.

== Passenger services ==
=== Access ===
Access to the station, designed in 1900 by the architect Hector Guimard of the Compagnie Générale du Métropolitain de Paris, has been listed as a historic monument since 29 May 1978.

It has four entrances:

- Entrance: 9, Boulevard de Denain;
- Entrance: 17, Rue de Dunkerque;
- Entrance: 18, Rue de Dunkerque;
- Entrance: SNCF station.

=== Station layout ===
Street Level

B1	Connecting level

Line 4 platforms	Side platform with PSDs doors will open on the right
Line 4 platforms	Northbound	← toward Porte de Clignancourt (Barbès – Rochechouart)
Line 4 platforms	Southbound	toward Bagneux–Lucie Aubrac (Gare de l'Est) →
Line 4 platforms	Side platform with PSDs doors will open on the right

Line 5 platforms	Side platform, doors will open on the right
Line 5 platforms	Southbound	← toward Place d'Italie (Gare de l'Est)
Line 5 platforms	Northbound	toward Bobigny – Pablo Picasso (Stalingrad) →
Line 5 platforms	Side platform, doors will open on the right

=== Platforms ===
The stations of the two lines are of a standard configuration: they include two platforms flanking two tracks under an elliptical vault. However, the Line 4 station also has a later extension, recognizable by its much higher ceiling and mezzanine.

The platforms of Line 5 are decorated in the Andreu-Motte style: the fittings are orange, but the tiles are white and bevelled. The advertising frames are metallic, and the name of the station is indicated on enamelled plates, in Parisine font. Line 4 platforms were raised and platform screen doors were installed in 2019.

=== Bus and RER connections ===
From the station, it is possible, thanks to underground links, to reach the RER B and RER D lines, the Gare de Magenta of the RER E and the La Chapelle of the Line 2.

The station is served by lines 26, 31, 35, 38, 39, 43, 45, 46, 48, 54, 56, 91, 302 and the OpenTour tourist line of the RATP Bus Network and, at night, by lines N01, N02, N14, N43, N44, N140 and N143 of the Noctilien network.

== Gallery ==
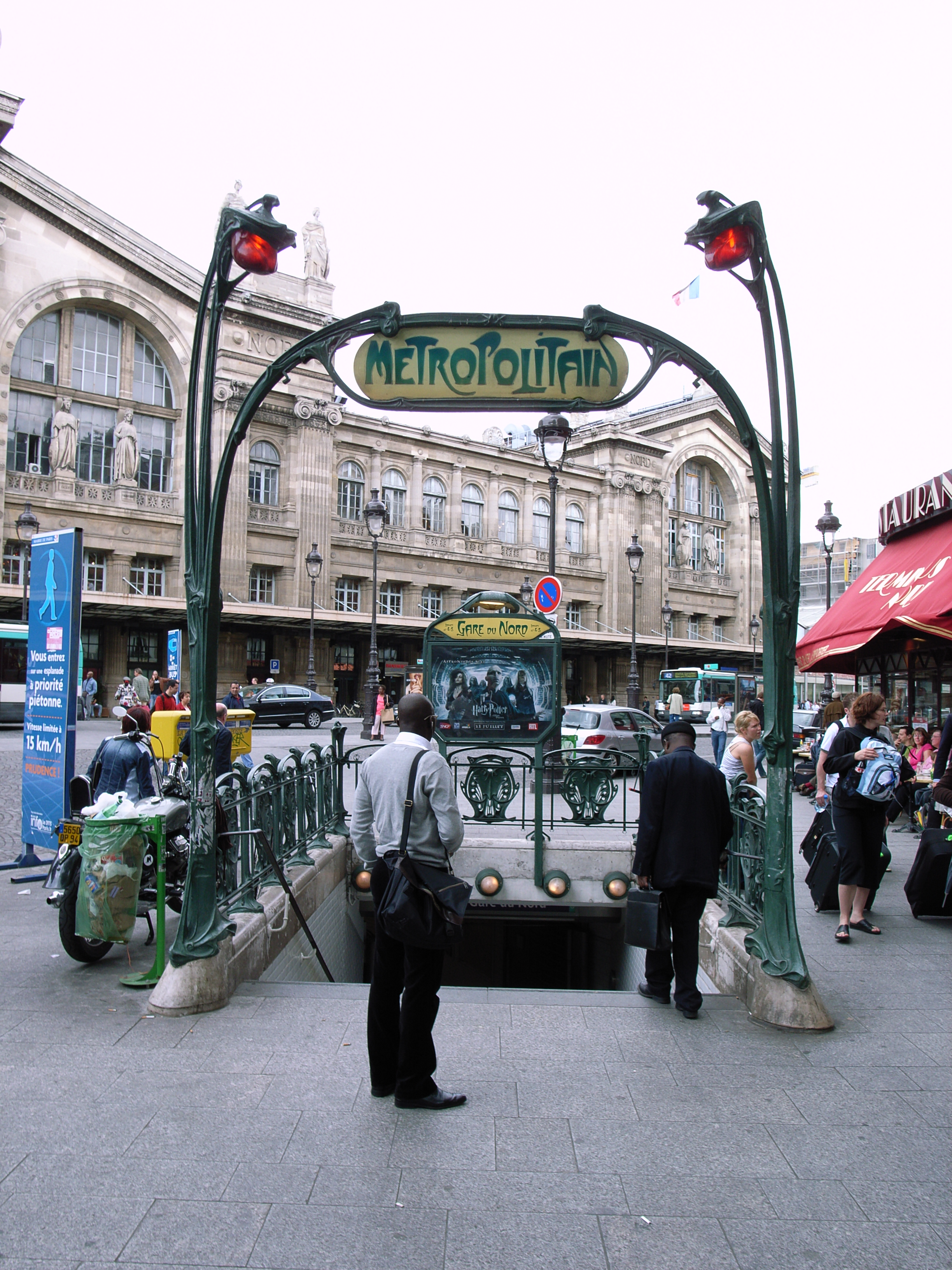
Street-level entrance to Gare du Nord

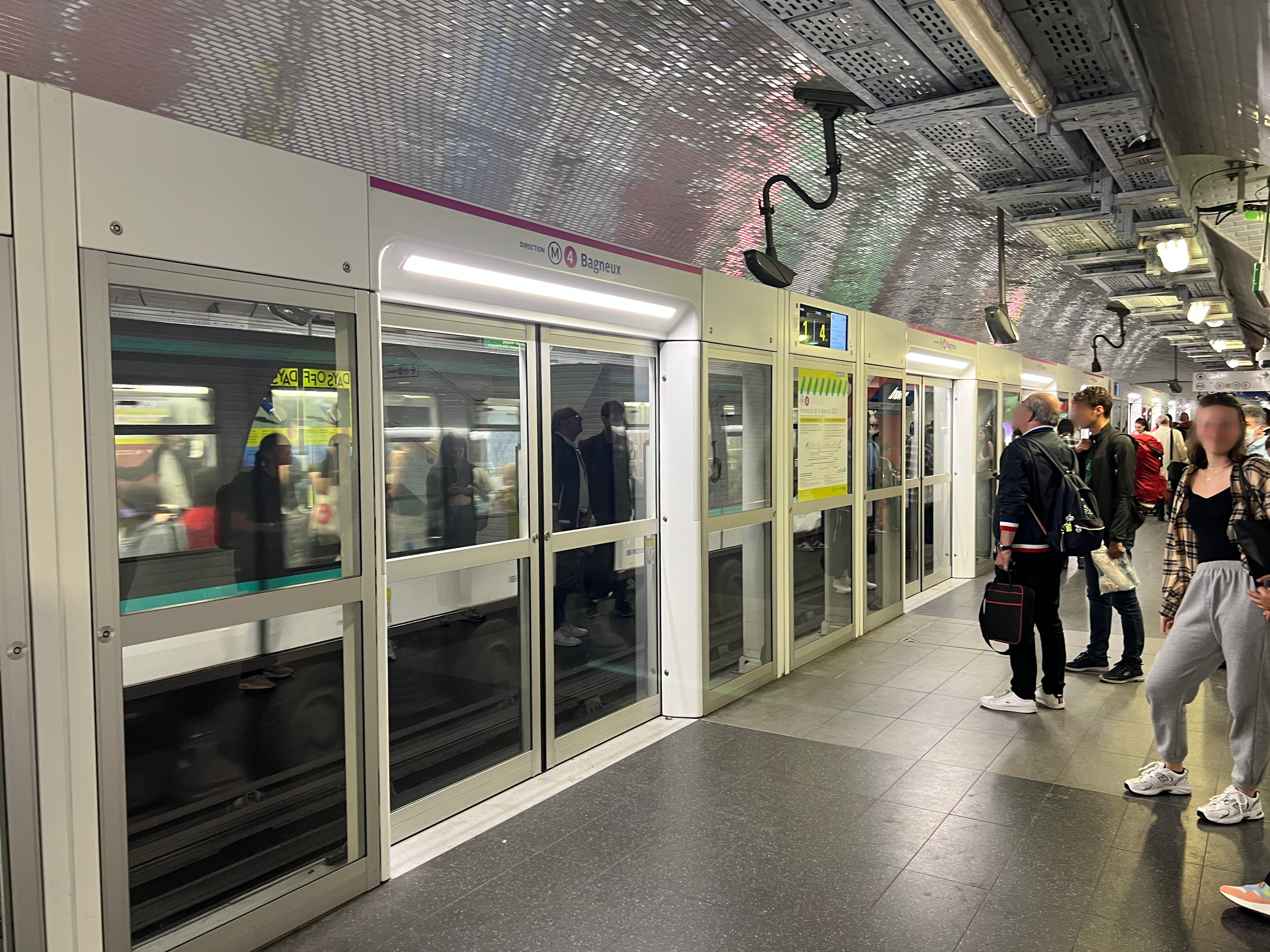
Line 4 platforms at Gare du Nord

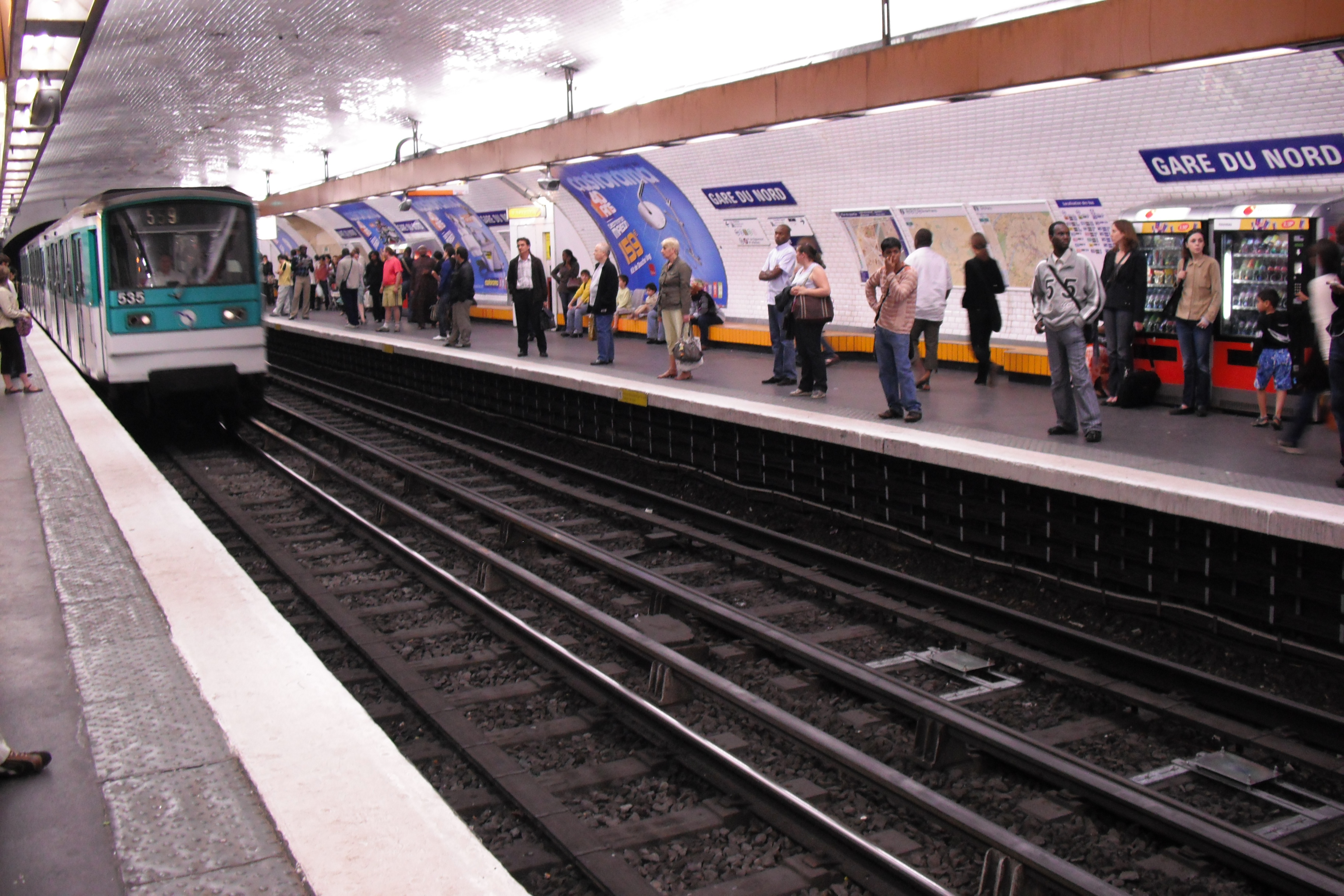
MF 67 rolling stock on Line 5 at Gare du Nord

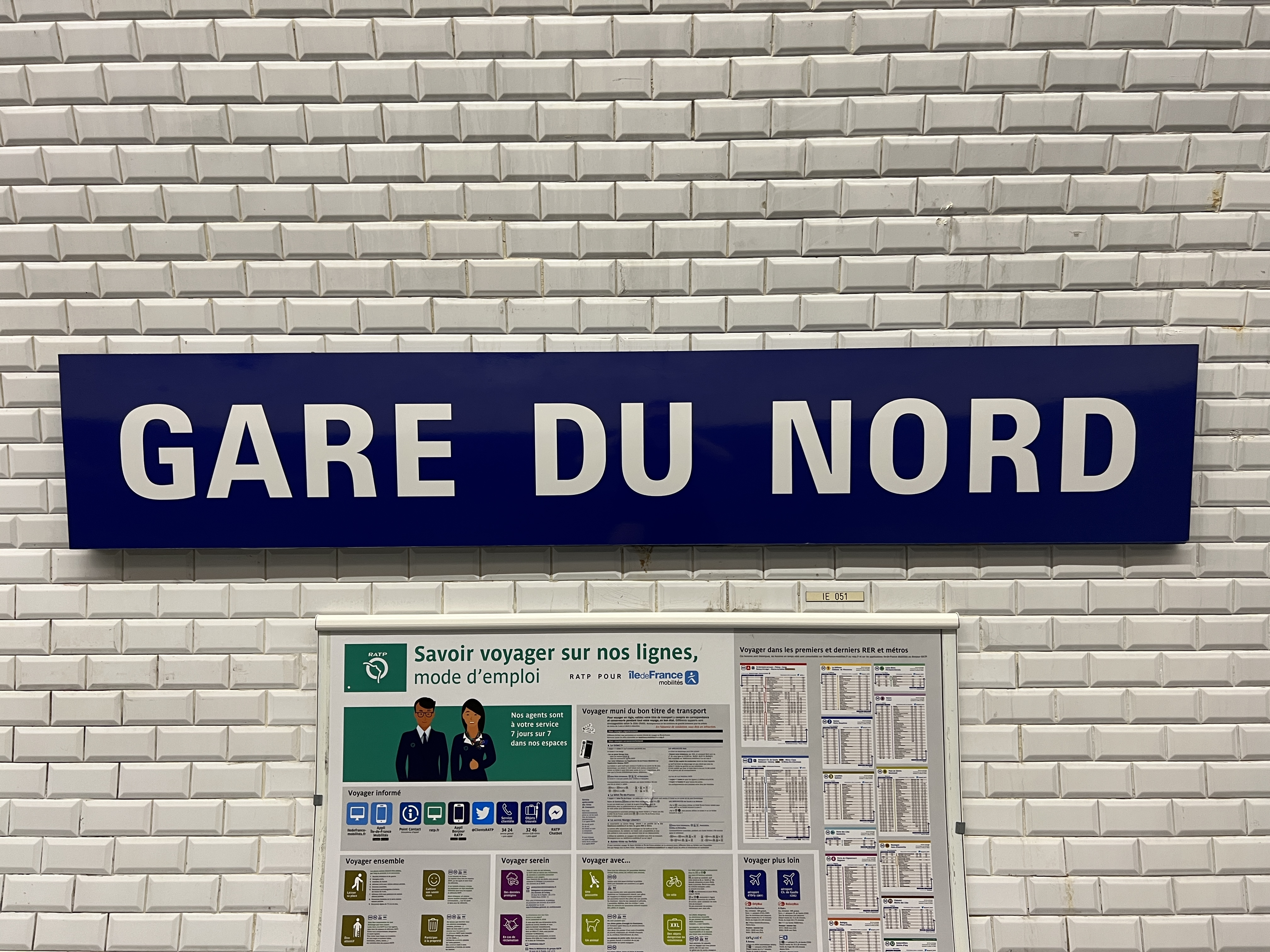
Platform signage

== See also ==
- Gare du Nord
- Gare de Magenta
