= Les Boullereaux-Champigny station =

French railway station in Champigny-sur-Marne

Les Boullereaux-Champigny
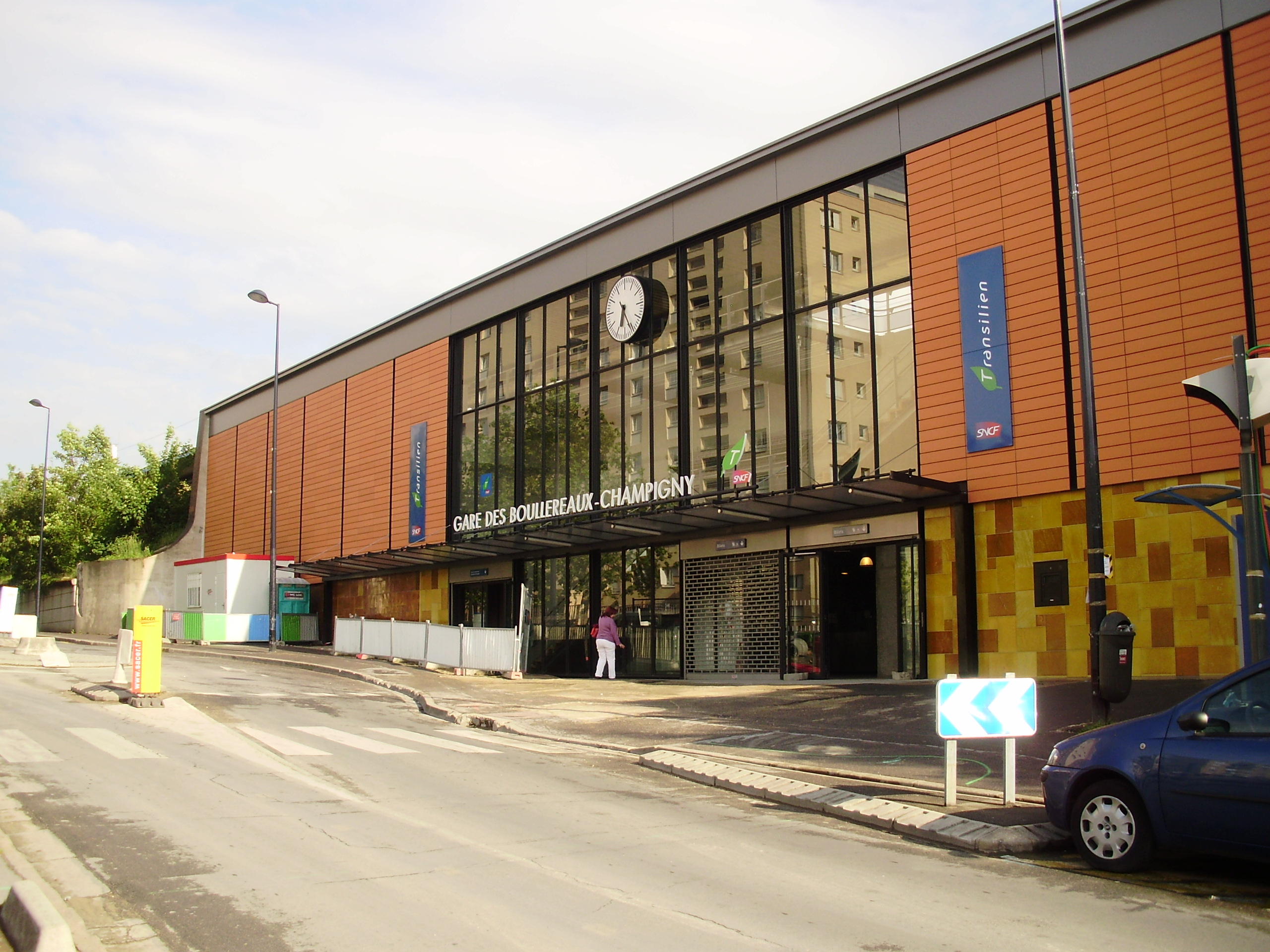
- Station entrance

General information
- Location: Avenue Danielle Casanova; Champigny-sur-Marne; France
- Coordinates: 48.82489°N 2.51103°E
- Owner: SNCF
- Operator: SNCF
- Line: Paris-Est–Mulhouse-Ville railway
- Platforms: 2
- Tracks: 2
- Connections: RATP Bus: 106 110 116; Noctilien: N130

Construction
- Accessible: Yes, by prior reservation

Other information
- Station code: 87113779
- Fare zone: 3

History
- Opened: 13 January 1974

Passengers
- 2024: 2,750,821

Services
Preceding station	RER	Following station
Nogent–Le Perreux towards Nanterre–La Folie	RER E	Villiers-sur-Marne–Le Plessis-Trévise towards Tournan
Future services
Preceding station	RER	Following station
Nogent–Le Perreux towards Nanterre–La Folie	RER E (late 2025)	Villiers–Champigny–Bry towards Tournan
Location

Les Boullereaux-Champigny is a French railway station in Champigny-sur-Marne, Val-de-Marne department, at kilometric point 18.473 of the Paris-Est–Mulhouse-Ville railway.

== The station ==
The station opened on 13 January 1974 as the railway became electrified between Noisy-le-Sec and Tournan. It was renovated and platforms were raised when RER E service started on branch E4, on 30 August 1999. It is named after a district of Champigny-sur-Marne.

== Service ==
The station is served in both directions by one train every 15 minutes off-peak, during peak times and at evening. More than 79 trains toward Haussmann–Saint-Lazare and 78 trains toward Villiers-sur-Marne–Le Plessis-Trévise station and Tournan (at evening) call at the station.

== Connections ==
Several buses stop near the station:

- RATP Group bus lines 106, 110 and 116
- Noctilien night lines N130

== See also ==
- List of RER stations
- Paris-Est–Mulhouse-Ville railway
- RER E
