= Magenta station =

Railway station in Paris

Magenta Gare du Nord
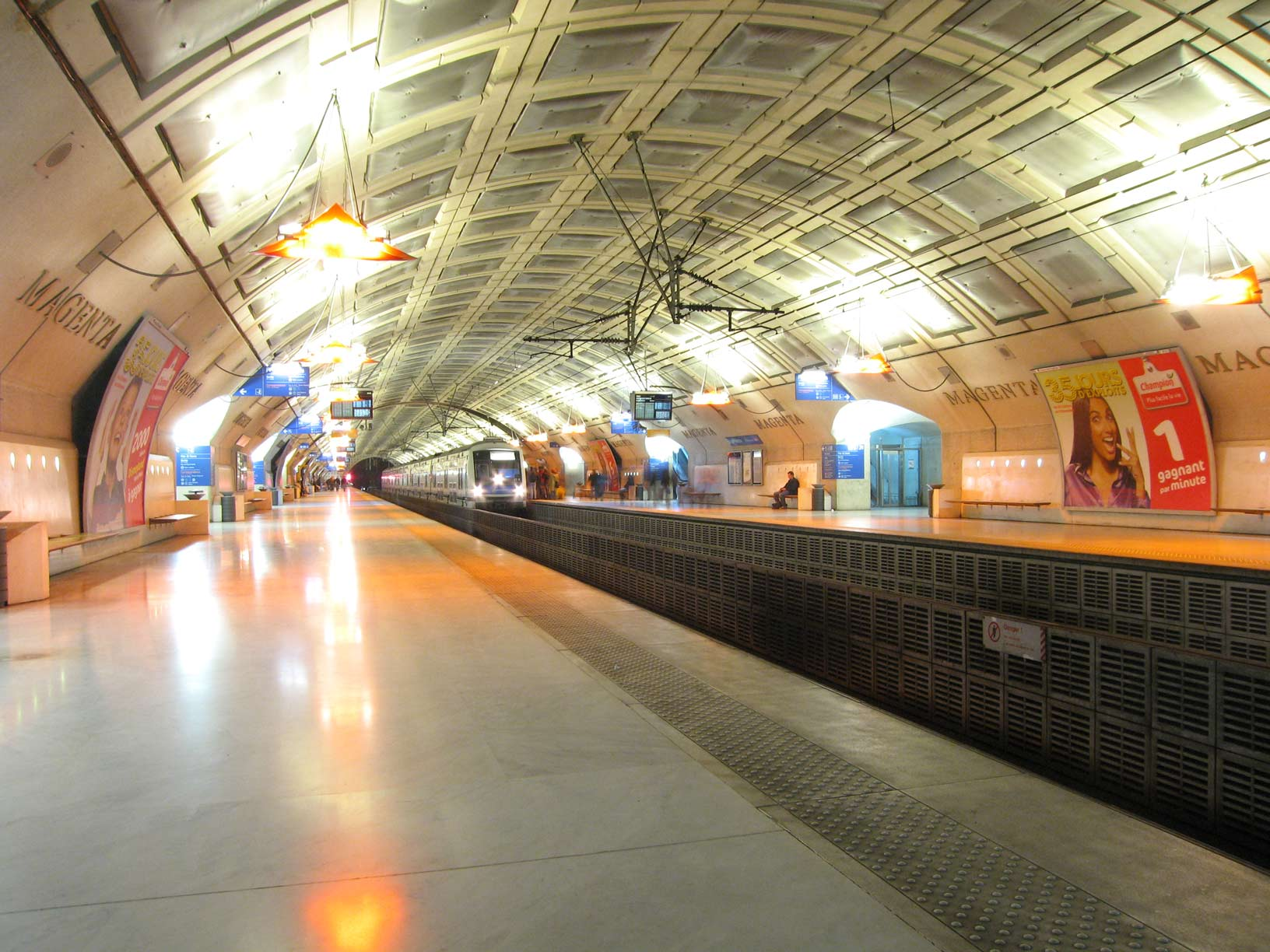
- Platforms in November 2006

General information
- Location: Paris; France
- Coordinates: 48°52′48″N 2°21′30″E
- Owner: SNCF
- Platforms: 2 side platforms
- Tracks: 4
- Bus routes: 26 30 31 38 39 42 43 46 48 54 56 65 302 350 OpenTour; N01 N02 N14 N43 N44 N140
- Connections: (at Gare du Nord); (at Gare du Nord); (at Gare de l'Est); (at La Chapelle); (at Gare de l'Est)

Construction
- Accessible: Yes, by prior reservation

Other information
- Station code: 87281873
- Fare zone: 1

History
- Opened: 14 July 1999

Passengers
- 2024: 38,771,197

Services
Preceding station	RER	Following station
Haussmann–Saint-Lazare towards Nanterre–La Folie	RER E	Rosa Parks towards Chelles–Gournay or Tournan
Connections to other stations
Preceding station	RER	Following station
La Plaine Stade de France towards Aéroport Charles de Gaulle 2 TGV or Mitry–Claye	RER B transfer at Gare du Nord	Châtelet towards Robinson or Saint-Rémy-lès-Chevreuse
Stade de France–Saint-Denis towards Creil	RER D transfer at Gare du Nord	Châtelet towards Corbeil-Essonnes
Stade de France–Saint-Denis towards Goussainville	RER D transfer at Gare du Nord	Châtelet towards Melun
Preceding station	Paris Metro	Following station
Barbès–Rochechouart towards Porte Dauphine	Line 2 transfer at La Chapelle	Stalingrad towards Nation
Château d'Eau towards Bagneux–Lucie Aubrac	Line 4 transfer at Gare de l'Est	Gare du Nord towards Porte de Clignancourt
Gare de l'Est towards Bagneux–Lucie Aubrac	Line 4 transfer at Gare du Nord	Barbès–Rochechouart towards Porte de Clignancourt
Jacques Bonsergent towards Place d'Italie	Line 5 transfer at Gare de l'Est	Gare du Nord towards Bobigny–Pablo Picasso
Gare de l'Est towards Place d'Italie	Line 5 transfer at Gare du Nord	Stalingrad towards Bobigny–Pablo Picasso
Poissonnière towards Villejuif–Louis Aragon or Mairie d'Ivry	Line 7 transfer at Gare de l'Est	Château-Landon towards La Courneuve–8 mai 1945
Location

Magenta station is a station of the Île-de-France Réseau Express Régional (RER), in the 10th arrondissement of Paris, France. Built on the site of the Gare du Nord, the original name of Magenta station was Nord-Est with the possibility of a connection to both Paris-Nord and Paris-Est.

== Location ==
The station is located on the underground section of the RER line E, immediately east of Gare du Nord. It follows the Haussmann–Saint-Lazare station (in the 9th arrondissement) and precedes the Rosa Parks station (in the 19th arrondissement).

== History ==
The station, which should have been called the Gare Nord-Est Station, was inaugurated by Prime Minister Lionel Jospin on 12 July 1999, before the opening to the public of RER line E on 14 July 1999. Its name comes from its proximity to the Boulevard de Magenta. In 2024, the SNCF estimated the annual use of the station at 39 million passengers.

== Passenger services ==
=== Access ===
Magenta station is directly connected to the Gare du Nord, with two of the three exits leading to this station. The third exit is located at 5-7 Rue de l'Aqueduc, facing Rue d'Alsace, which is the main pedestrian route between the Gare de l'Est and Gare du Nord.

==== Gare du Nord – Gare de l'Est link ====
It is planned to extend the Château-Landon transfer corridor to connect the Gare du Nord, the Magenta station and the Gare de l'Est by 2028. In the meantime, it is only possible to reach the Gare de l'Est from Magenta via the Rue d'Alsace.

=== Station ===
There are four tracks that flank two island platforms. They are numbered as tracks 51, 52, 53, and 54. Track 51 is used for trains to Chelles-Gournay station. Track 53 serves Tournan station. Tracks 52 and 54 are always used for service to Haussmann–Saint-Lazare station.

The station was built at a depth of 30 m, under the foundations of the existing old building. Large, spacious, with high and airey ceilings, a complete change from the usual train and metro stations. Its upper access corridors are a mix of polished raw concrete and exotic wood. The building has nine levels and a ground floor. The ninth level is used by SNCF.

The vast volumes of the station as well as the ventilation of the tunnel required the creation of ventilation shafts within the block of buildings built on the surface: for example, at 174 Rue du Faubourg-Saint-Denis, is a fake building, the façade with trompe-l'œil windows hiding a ventilation duct of the underground station. In the same street, 162 bis, at the corner of Rue La Fayette, conceals a large ventilation duct emerging behind the building built on the street. The station, built close to groundwater, has suffered leaks since its opening.

=== Other connections ===
- Gare du Nord (RER B and D, lines 4 and 5, suburban trains, national and international trains: TGV, Eurostar)
- Gare de l'Est (underground lines 4, 5 and 7, suburban trains, national and international trains: TGV, ICE)
- Château-Landon (Paris Métro Line 7)
- La Chapelle (Paris Métro Line 2)

== Gallery ==
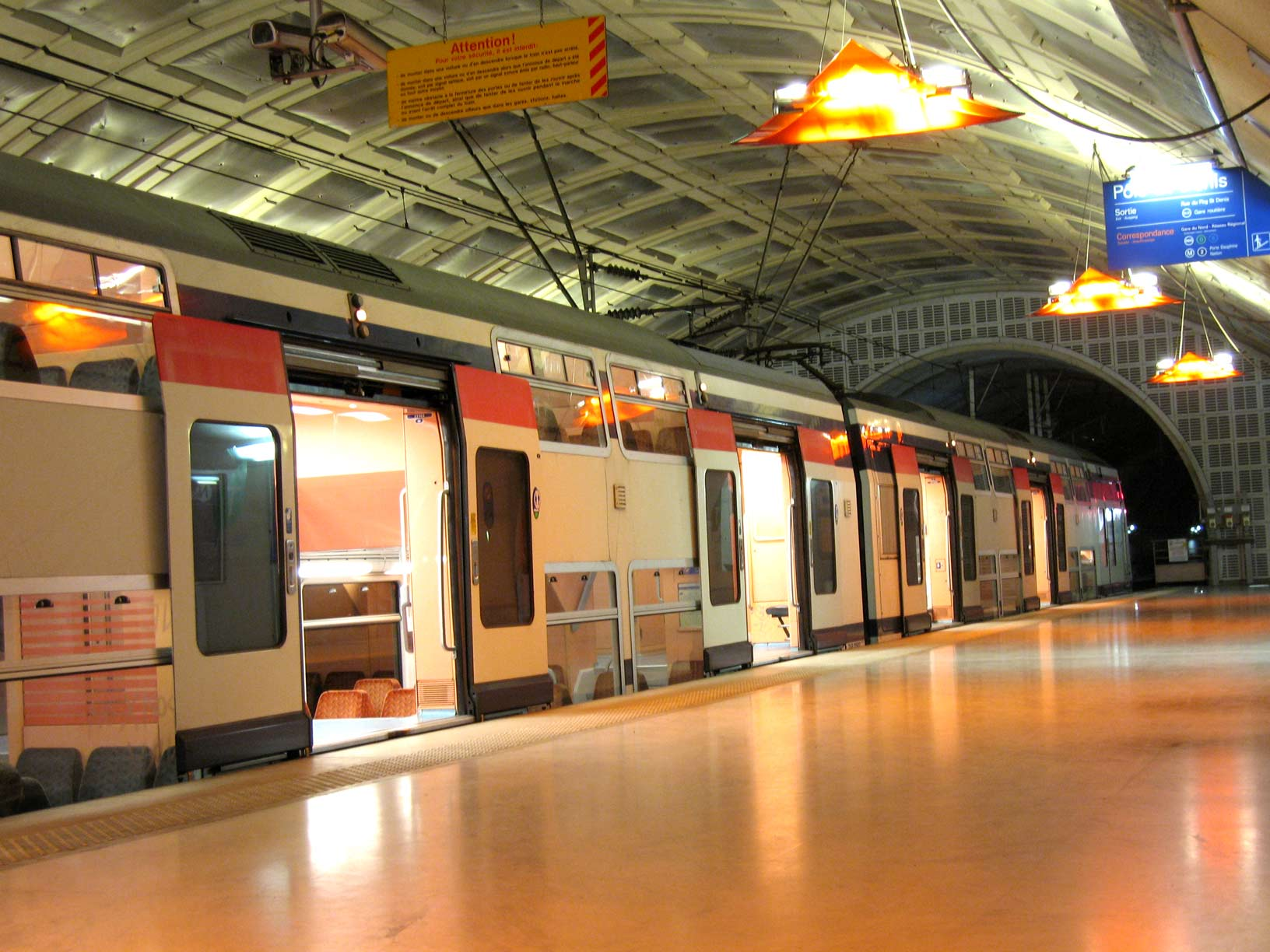
Z 22500 rolling stock on RER E at Magenta

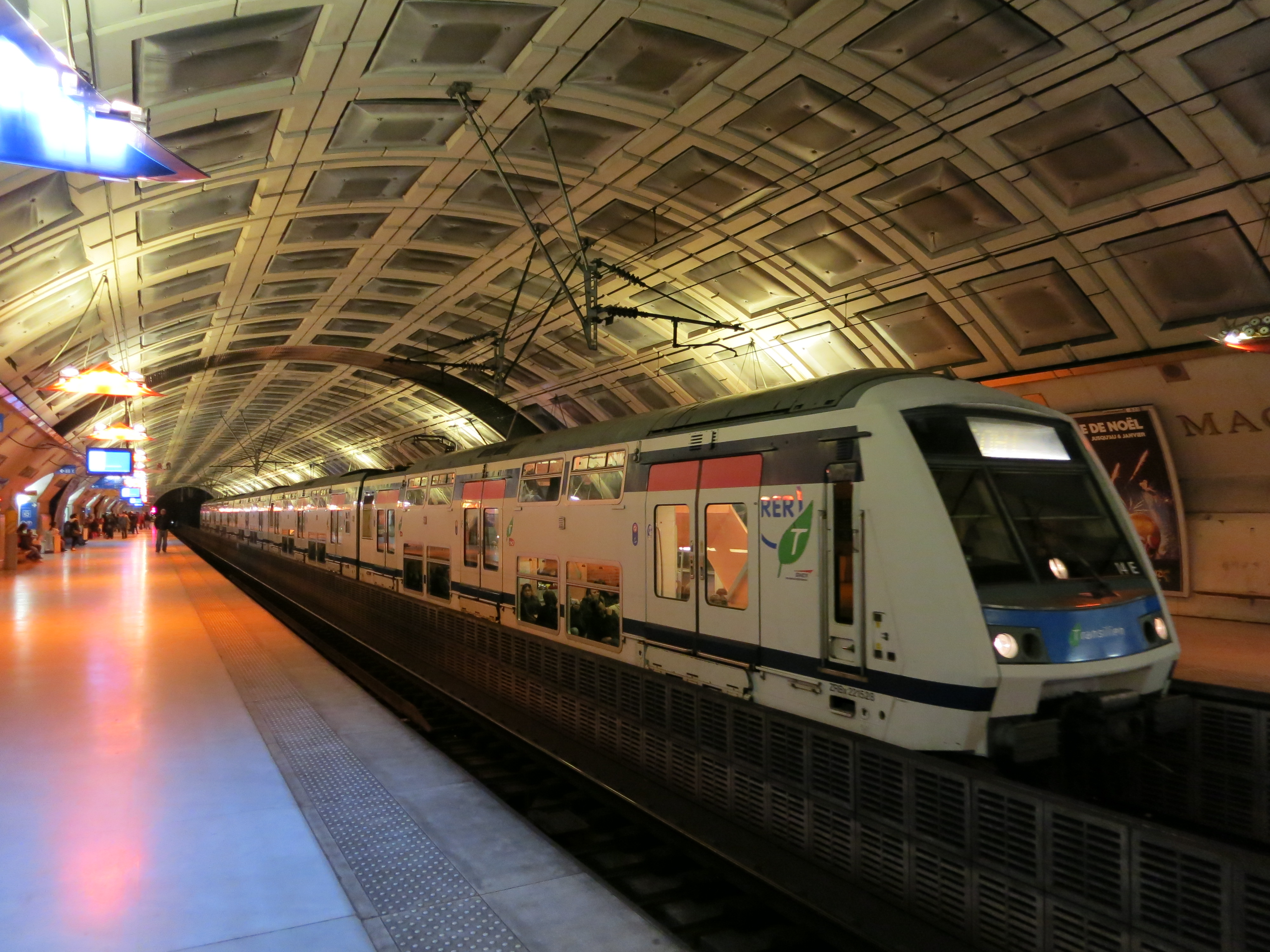
Z 22500 rolling stock on RER E at Magenta

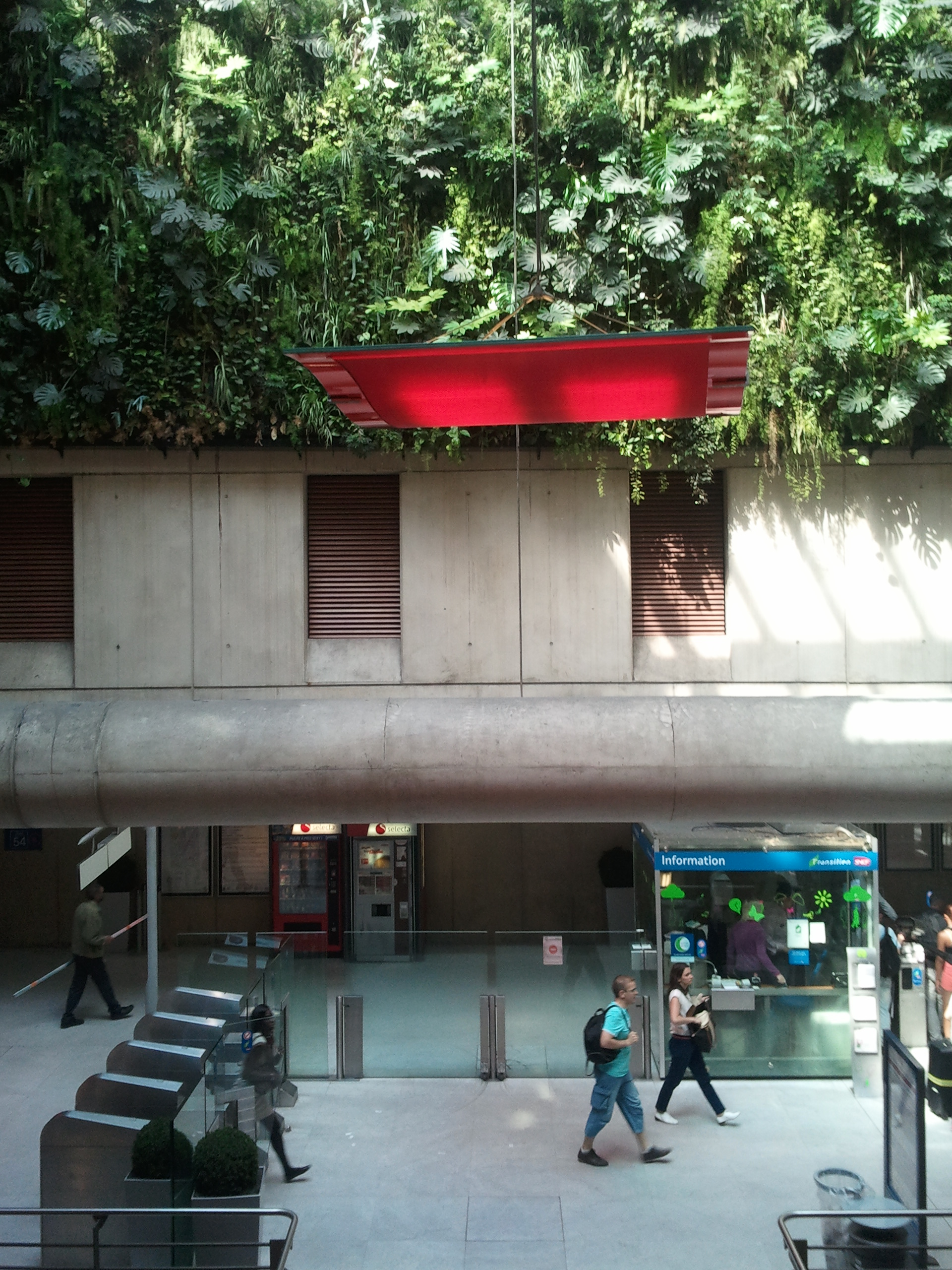
Station entrance

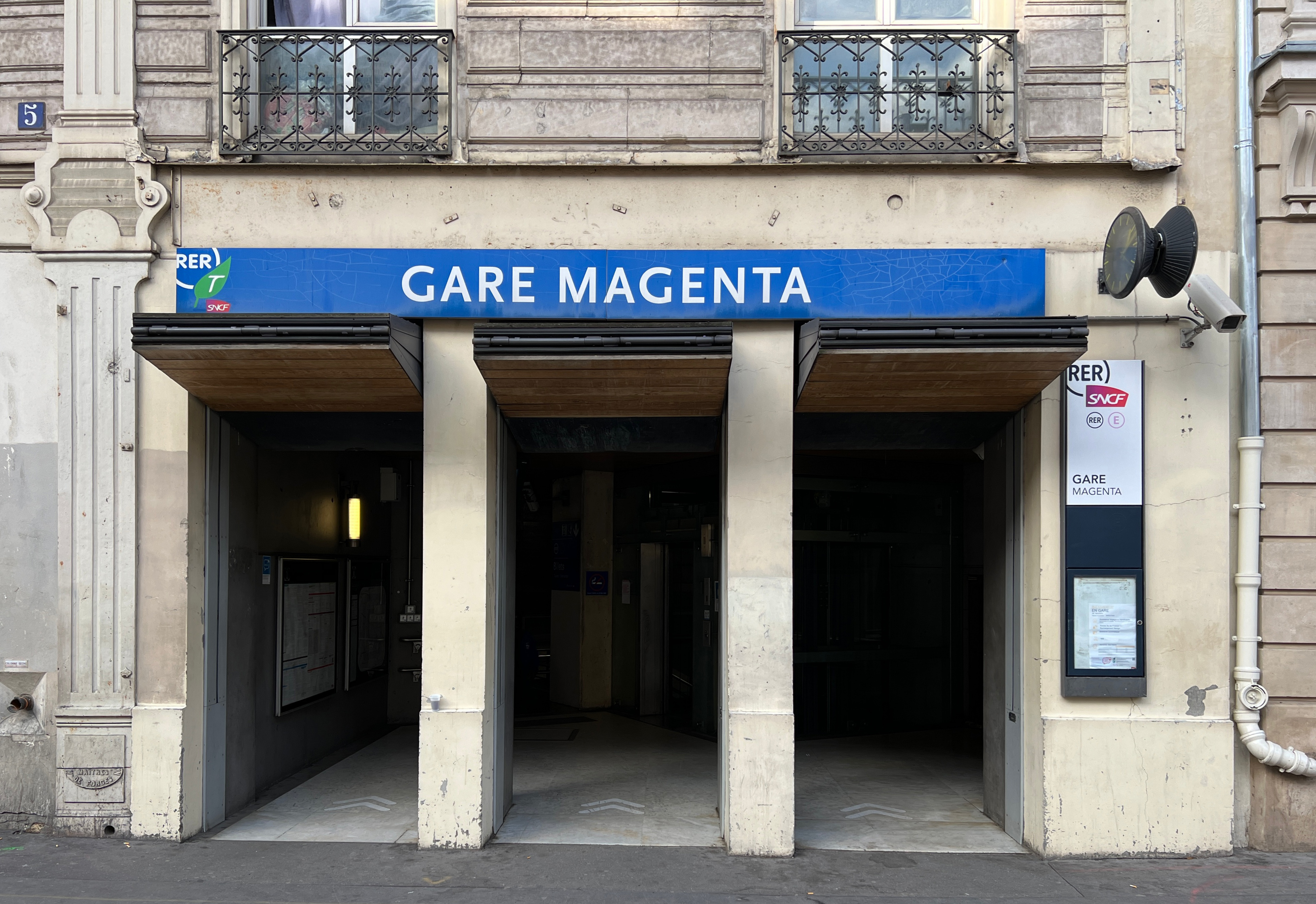
Access to the underground station

== See also ==
- List of stations of the Paris RER
- List of stations of the Paris Métro
