= Rosa Parks station (Paris) =

Railway station in Paris, France

Rosa Parks
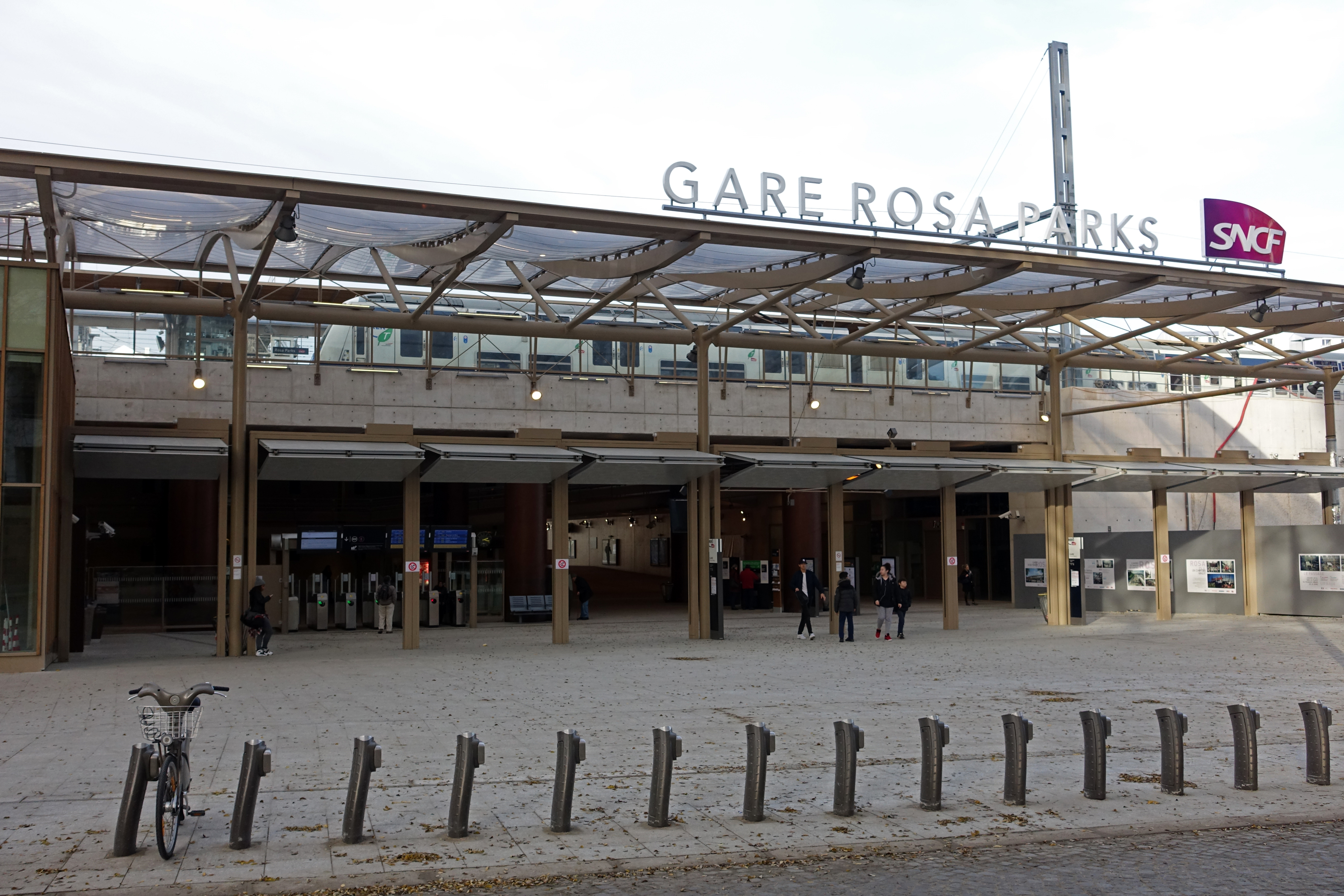
- Station building on Rue Gaston-Tessier

General information
- Location: 39 Rue Gaston-Tessier; 19th arrondissement of Paris; France
- Coordinates: 48°53′47″N 2°22′27″E
- Operator: SNCF (RER) & RATP (Tram)
- Platforms: 1 (RER), 2 (Tram)
- Tracks: 2 (RER), 2 (Tram)
- Bus routes: Traverse Ney-Flandre; RATP Bus: 35 45 54 60 239 519; Noctilien: N140

Construction
- Accessible: RER: Yes, by prior reservation; Tram: Yes

Other information
- Station code: 87654798
- Fare zone: 1

History
- Opened: 15 December 2012 (Tram); 13 December 2015 (RER)

Passengers
- 2024: 14,064,366

Services
Preceding station	RER	Following station
Magenta towards Nanterre–La Folie	RER E	Pantin towards Chelles–Gournay or Tournan
Location

Rosa Parks station (French: Gare Rosa Parks) is a railway station in the 19th arrondissement of Paris, France near the Porte d'Aubervilliers. It is on the RER network, and also has a tram stop. The station opened on 13 December 2015, and bears the name of American civil rights activist Rosa Parks.

== History ==
The station, initially named Évangile because of its proximity to Rue de l'Évangile, is located on the site of the former Est-Ceinture and Évangile stations, both part of the Parisian circular line "Petite Ceinture".

The remnants of Évangile station were demolished in 2011. A new stop on Tram Line 3b opened at the station site on 15 December 2012 and the RER station opened on 13 December 2015.

The station bears the name of American civil rights activist Rosa Parks. Explaining the name, Annick Lepetit, deputy of Bertrand Delanoë (Mayor of Paris from 2001 to 2014) in charge of transport, stated: "We wanted at least 50% female names. There has been much debate, especially with RATP, which favours existing place names, but for Rosa Parks there was a consensus: this is necessary for a tram station, it is a strong symbol".

== Services ==
The station, located on the Paris-Est–Strasbourg-Ville and Paris-Est–Mulhouse-Ville railways, both departing from Paris-Est, is served by the suburban line RER E. Île-de-France tramway Line 3b opened on 15 December 2012 with a stop located at the station.

== Future ==
The extension of RER line E to Mantes-la-Jolie station is planned for December 2026. It is planned that the extension will be served by 6 trains per hour, and that these trains will have a Paris terminus at Rosa Parks. In order to accommodate this, two turnback platforms will be built.

== Gallery ==
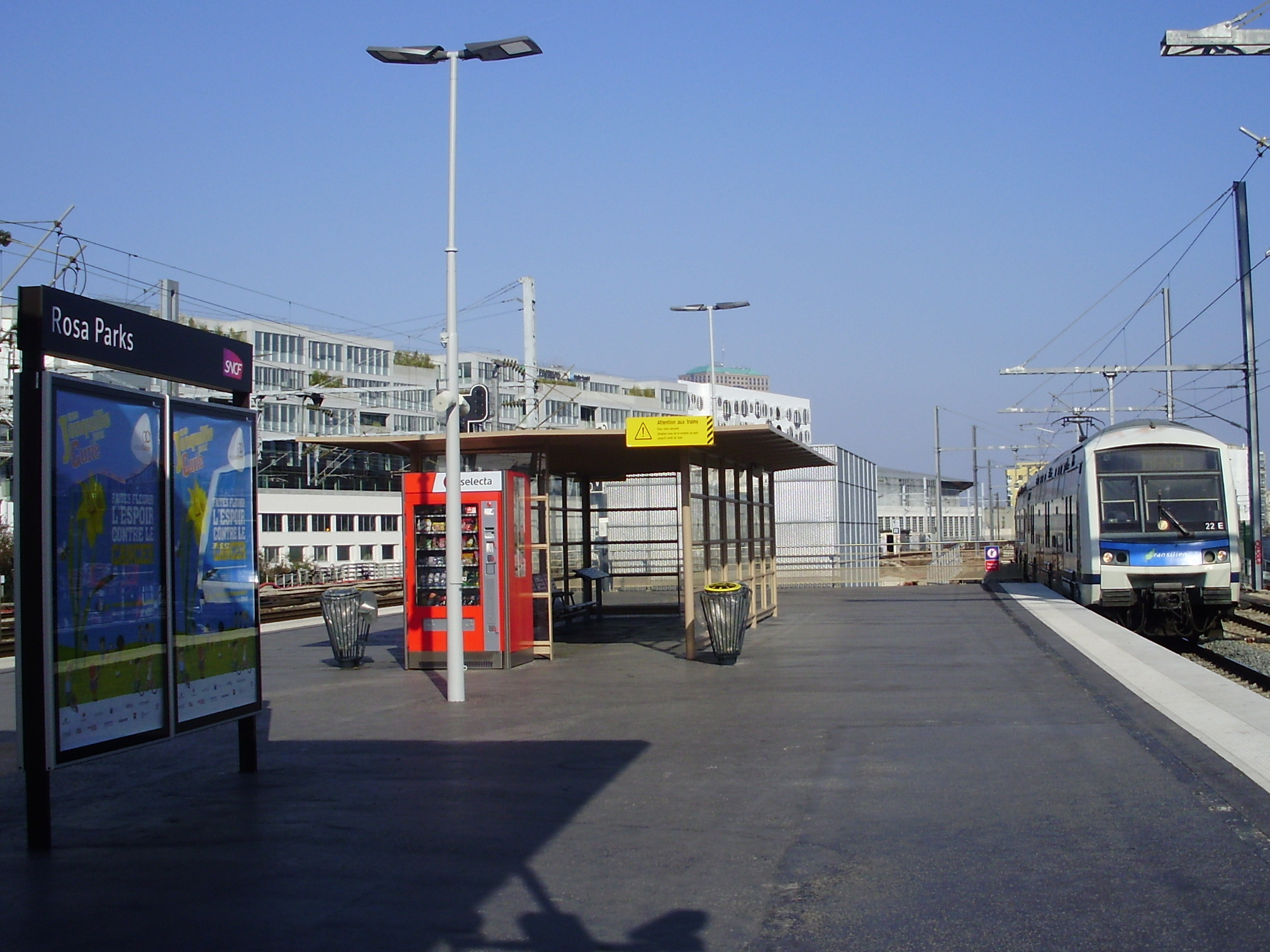
A Z 22500 to Haussmann–Saint-Lazare approaching the station platform

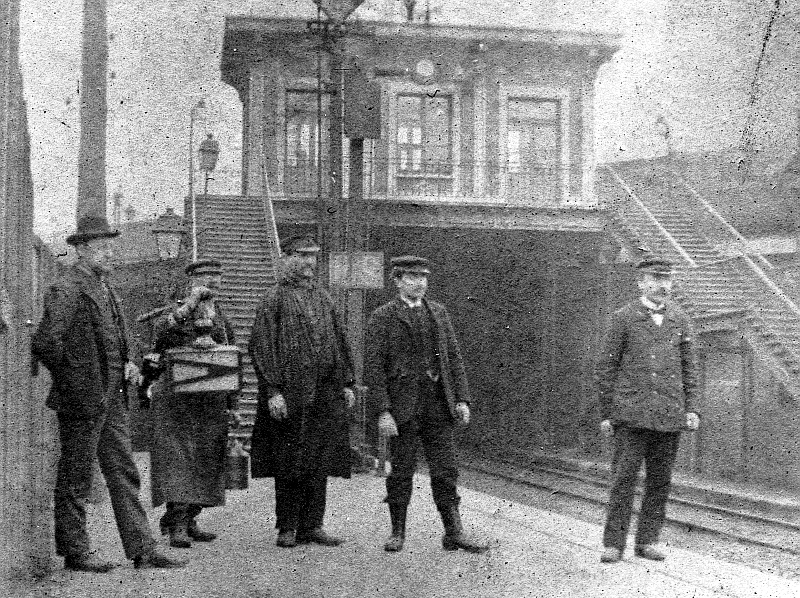
The old Est-Ceinture station, January 1900

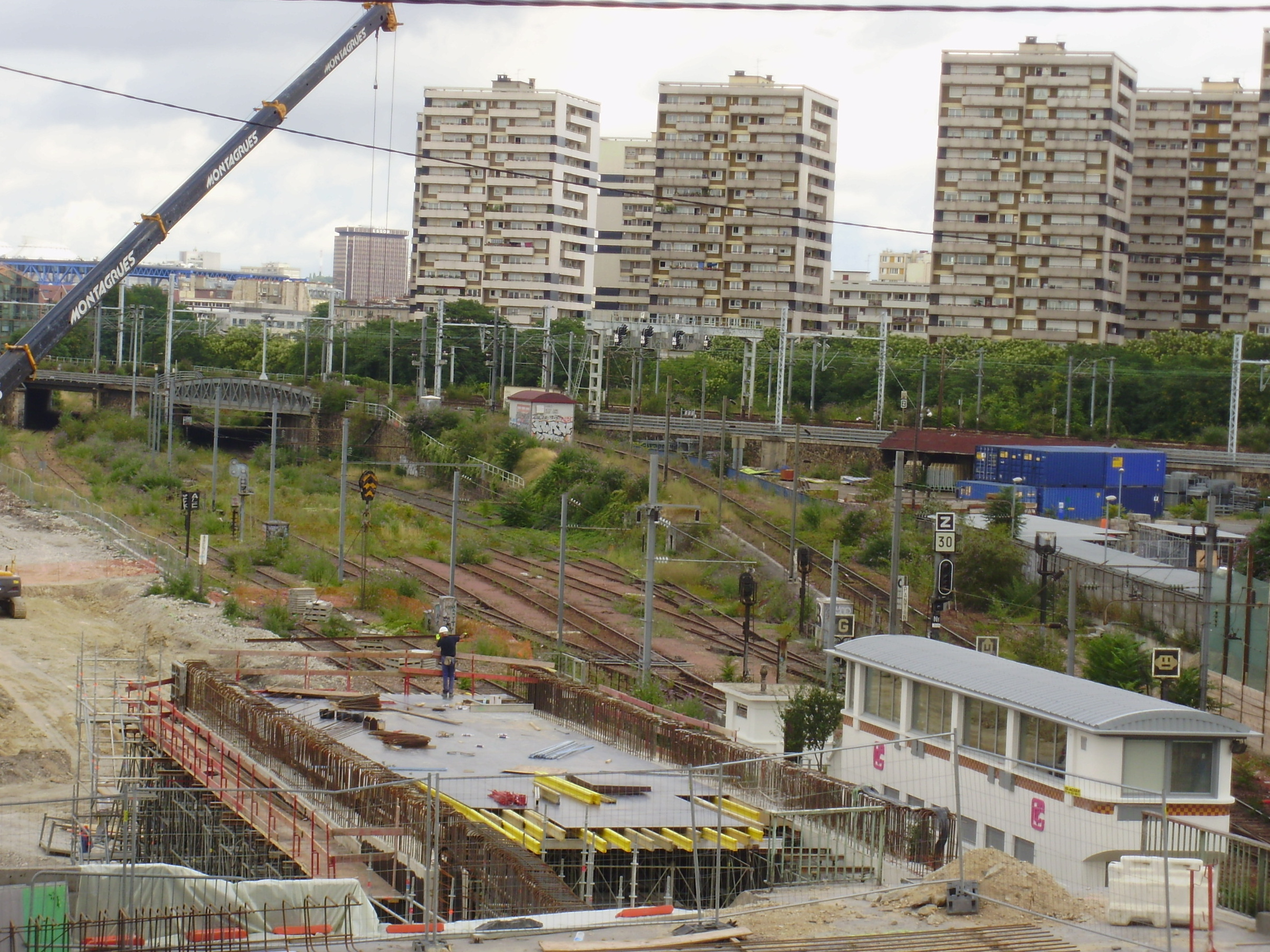
The area of the old Évangile station in 2010

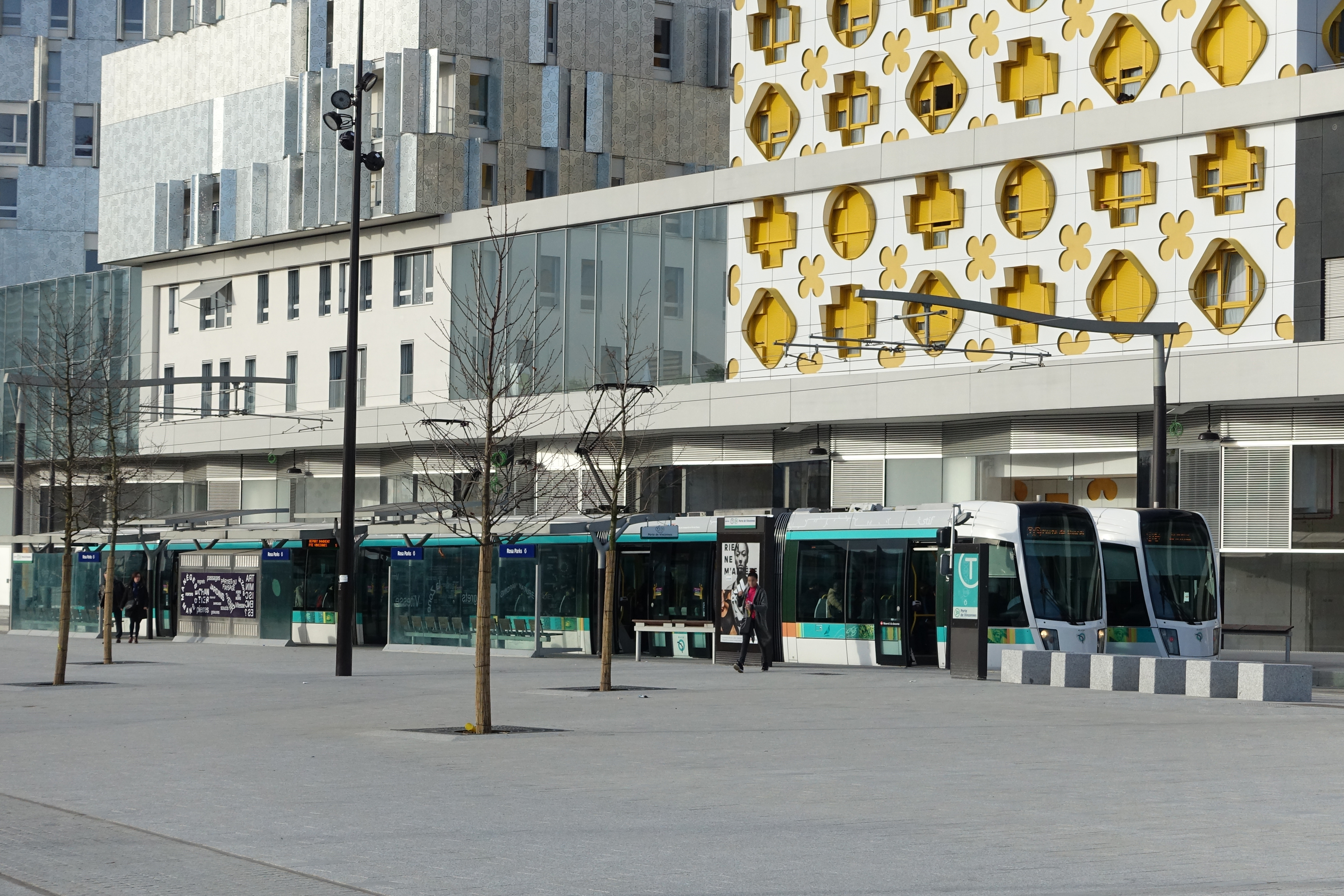
T3b tram stop operating, 2015
