= Noisy-le-Sec station =

Railway station in Noisy-le-Sec, Seine-Saint-Denis, France

Noisy-le-Sec
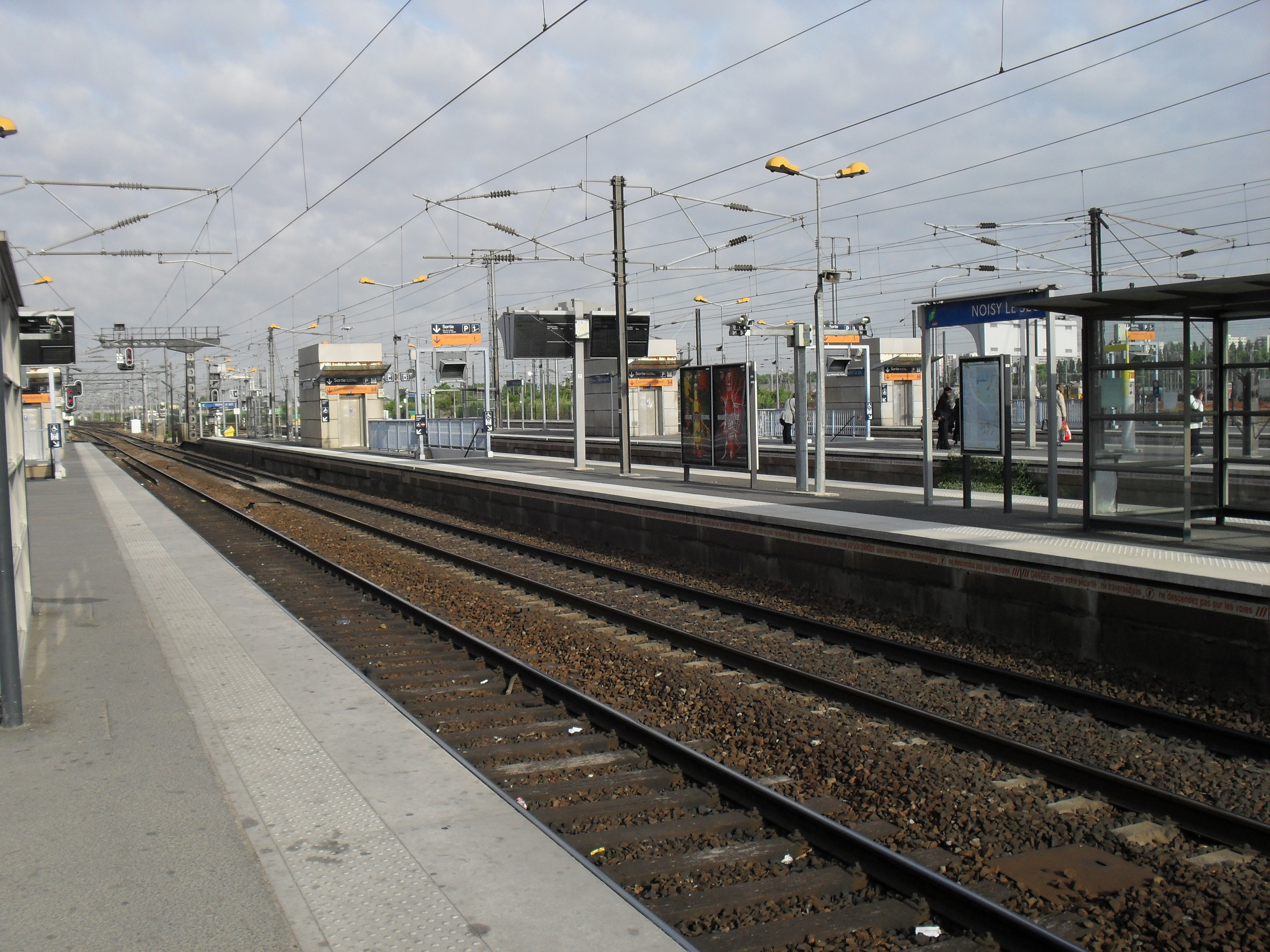
- Tracks and platforms of the station in 2011

General information
- Location: Place Jean-Coquelin; Noisy-le-Sec; France
- Coordinates: 48°53′48″N 2°27′35″E
- Operator: SNCF
- Line: Paris-Est–Strasbourg-Ville railway
- Platforms: 4
- Tracks: 8
- Connections: RATP Bus: 105 143 545

Construction
- Parking: 137 spaces
- Accessible: Yes, by prior reservation

Other information
- Station code: 87113217
- Fare zone: 3

History
- Opened: 5 July 1849
- Rebuilt: 1910, 1999

Passengers
- 2024: 18,359,020

Services
Preceding station	RER	Following station
Pantin towards Nanterre–La Folie	RER E	Bondy towards Chelles–Gournay
Pantin towards Nanterre–La Folie	RER E	Rosny–Bois-Perrier towards Tournan
Preceding station	Tram	Following station
Petit Noisy towards Asnières–Quatre Routes	T1	Terminus
Location

Noisy-le-Sec station is a railway station in Noisy-le-Sec, Seine-Saint-Denis, France. The station opened in 1849 and is on the Paris-Est–Strasbourg-Ville railway and Paris-Est–Mulhouse-Ville railway. The station is served by RER Line E services operated by the SNCF and Île-de-France tramway Line 1, operated by RATP Group. The station has long functioned as an important depot and marshalling yard, making it a major railway node.

The original station opened in the year 1849 with the first part of the railway line from Paris-Est to Strasbourg-Ville and was enlarged in 1910. During the first World War, it was an important station for transporting troops to the front lines. Following World War II, the station was rebuilt and later modified for the commencement of RER services in 1999. The Tramway Line 1 extension to Noisy-le-Sec opened in the month of December 2003.

== Train services ==
The station is served by the following services:

- Commuter services (RER E) Haussmann–Saint-Lazare–Chelles–Gournay
- Commuter services (RER E) Haussmann–Saint-Lazare–Tournan

== Gallery ==
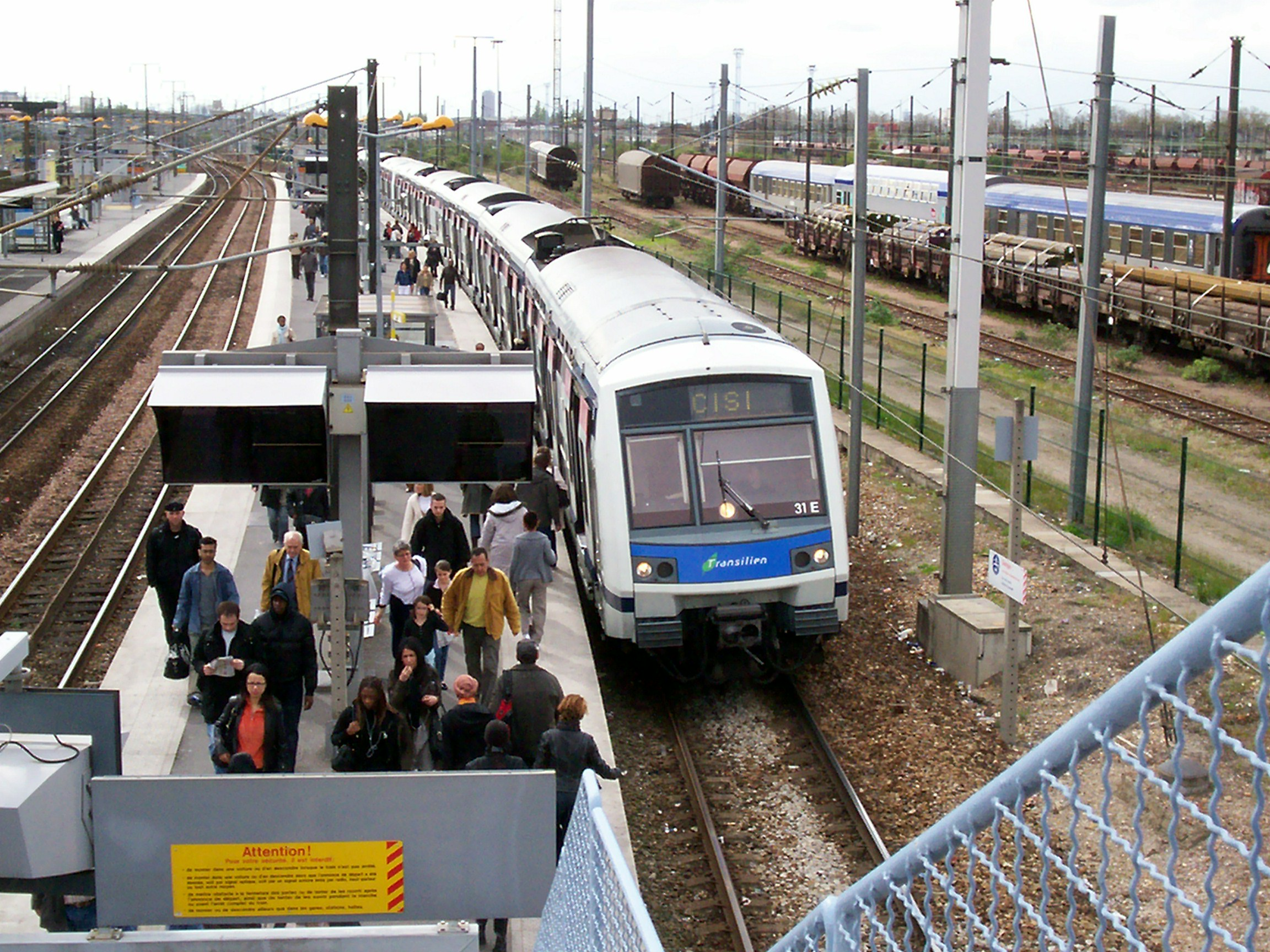
Z 22500 rolling stock at Noisy-le-Sec

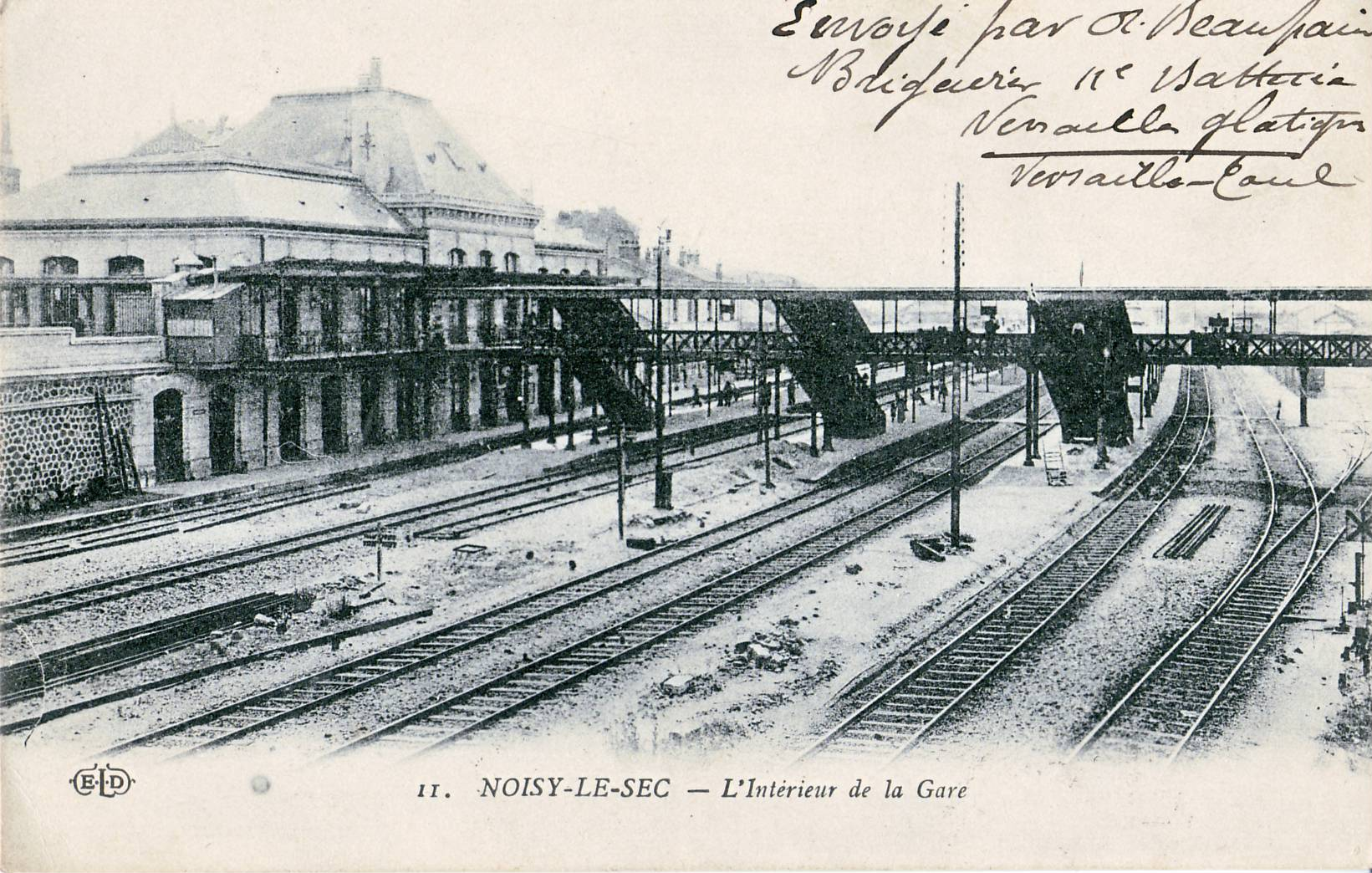
Noisy-le-Sec before World War I

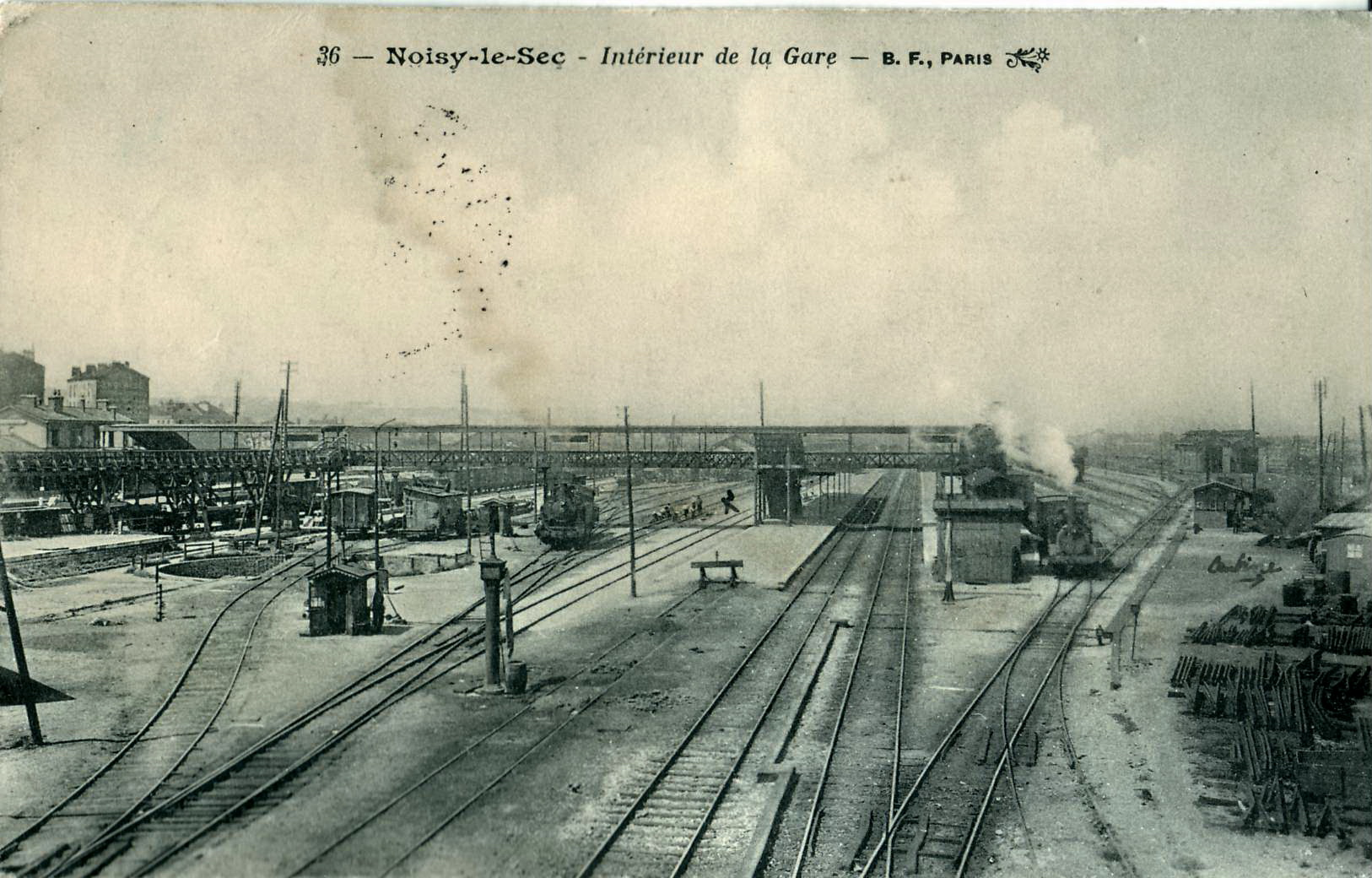
Noisy-le-Sec before World War I
