= Pantin station =

Railway station in the commune of Pantin, France

Pantin
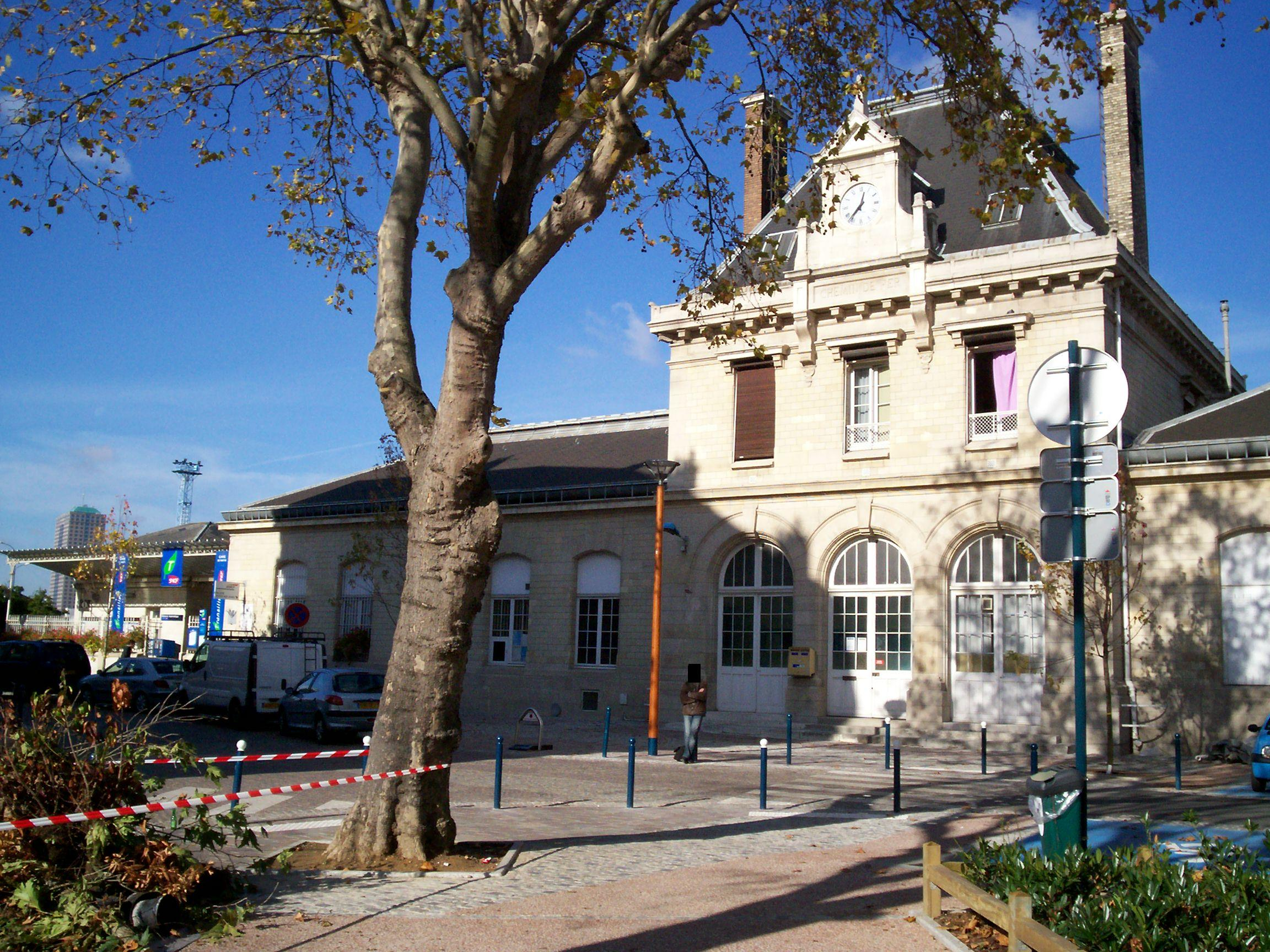

General information
- Location: Place du Président Salvador Allende, 93500 Pantin; France
- Coordinates: 48.89789°N 2.400438°E
- Operator: SNCF
- Line: Paris-Est–Strasbourg-Ville railway
- Platforms: 3
- Tracks: 6
- Connections: 151 170 249 330; N13 N41 N140

Construction
- Accessible: Yes, by prior reservation

Other information
- Station code: 87113209
- Fare zone: 2

History
- Opened: 1864; 162 years ago

Passengers
- 2024: 9,627,326

Services
| Preceding station | RER | Following station |
|---|---|---|
| Rosa Parks towards Nanterre–La Folie | RER E | Noisy-le-Sec towards Chelles–Gournay or Tournan |
Location

Pantin is a railway station in Pantin, Seine-Saint-Denis, France. It opened in 1864 on the Paris–Strasbourg railway and Paris–Mulhouse railway. Since 1999, Pantin station is served by RER E trains operated by SNCF.

Pantin station is in Paris transport zone 2.

== Train services ==
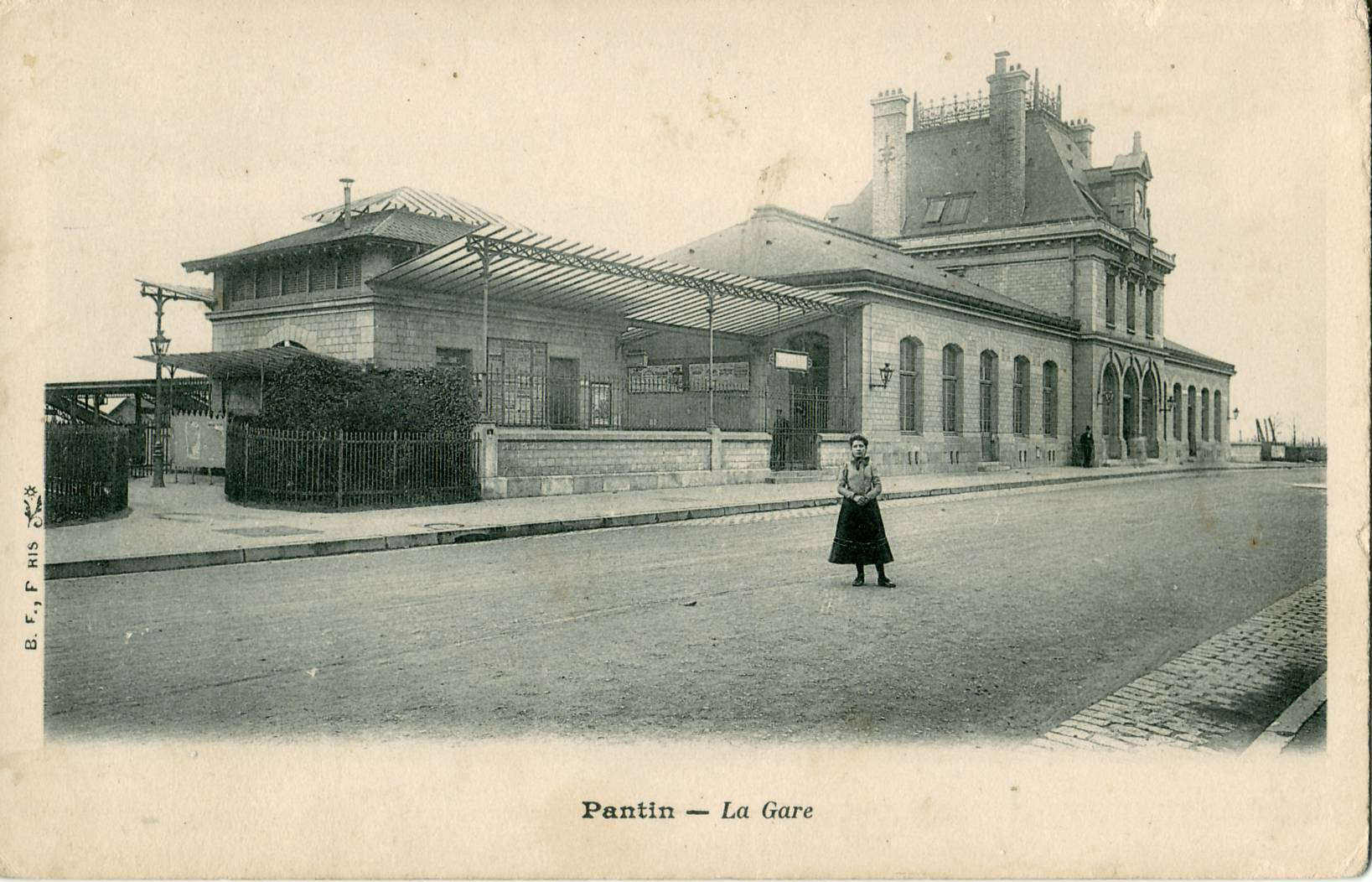
Pantin station circa 1900

The station is served by the following service(s):

- Paris Regional-Express (RER E): Haussmann–Saint-Lazare–Chelles–Gournay
- Paris Regional-Express (RER E): Haussmann–Saint-Lazare–Tournan

Pantin served 7,500 passengers daily in 2009 and this number is expected to increase with the renovation of the Pantin mills and regeneration development of new government offices and businesses in the area.

RER E trains departs every 5–10 minutes in the direction of central Paris: Magenta for Gare du Nord and Haussmann–Saint-Lazare stations.

== Connections ==
The bus stop for Pantin RER is located on the main roads, a short distance away from the station entrance. Bus 151 runs to Porte de Pantin metro station and the Philharmonie de Paris concert hall complex.

Night buses N13 and N140 originate from the Gare de l'Est (Paris East Railway Station). N140 stops at fewer places along the route until Pantin, then continues to Roissy-Charles de Gaulle Airport Terminal 3.

- 151, 170, 249, 330
- N13, N41, N140

== Gallery ==
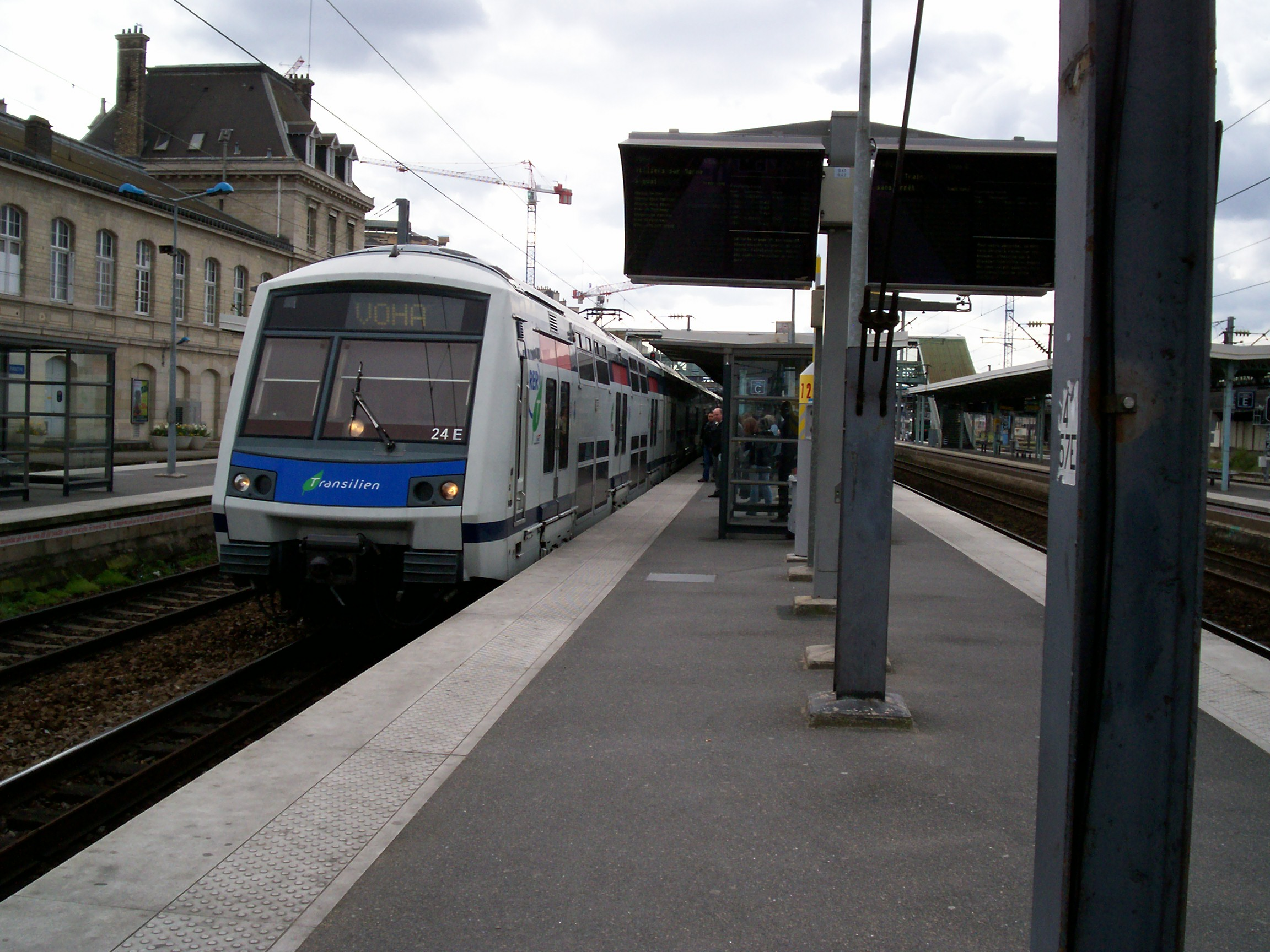
Z 22500 rolling stock on RER E at Pantin.

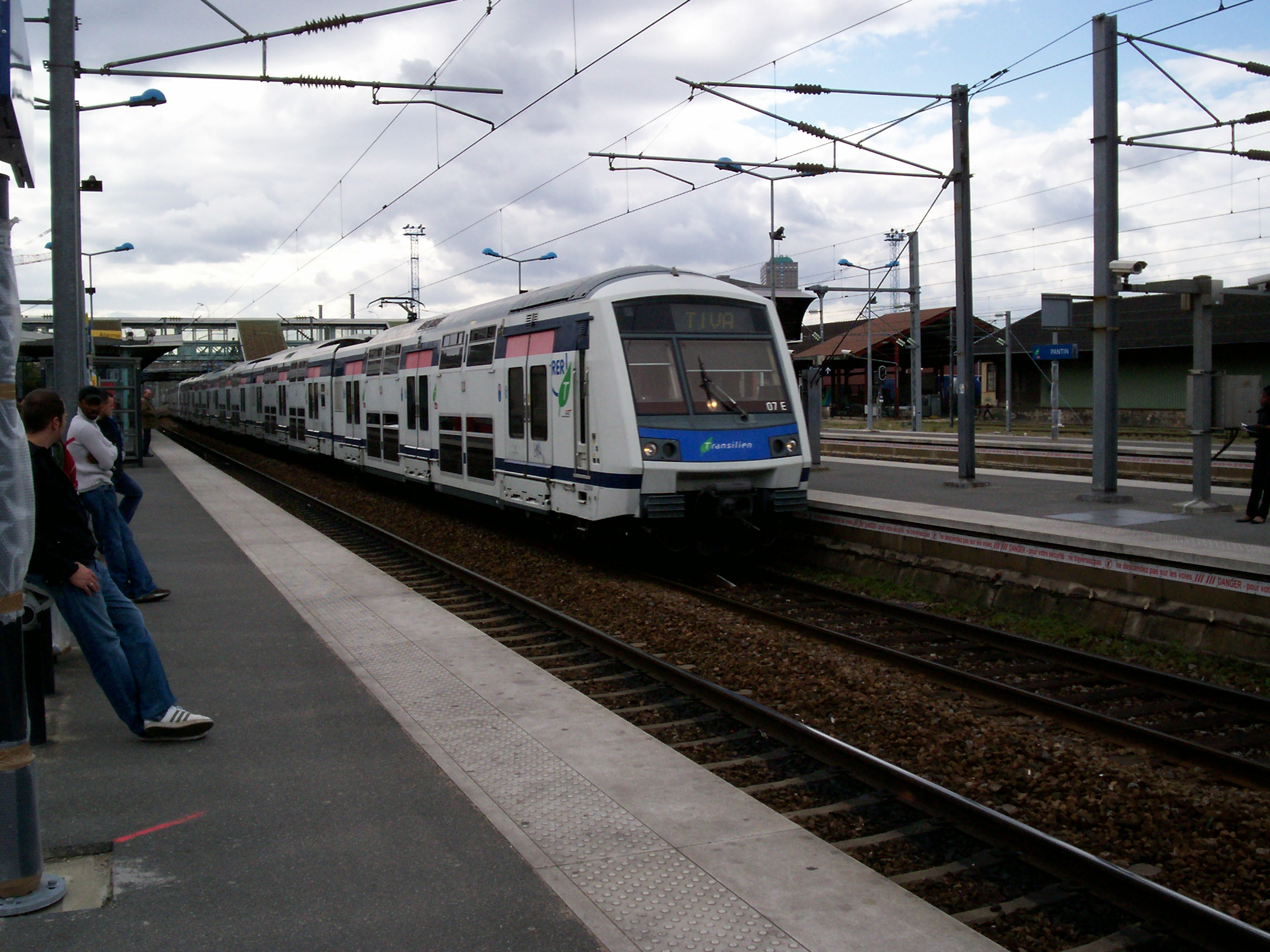
Z 22500 rolling stock on RER E at Pantin.

== See also ==
- List of stations of the Paris RER
