= RER E =

Paris commuter train route

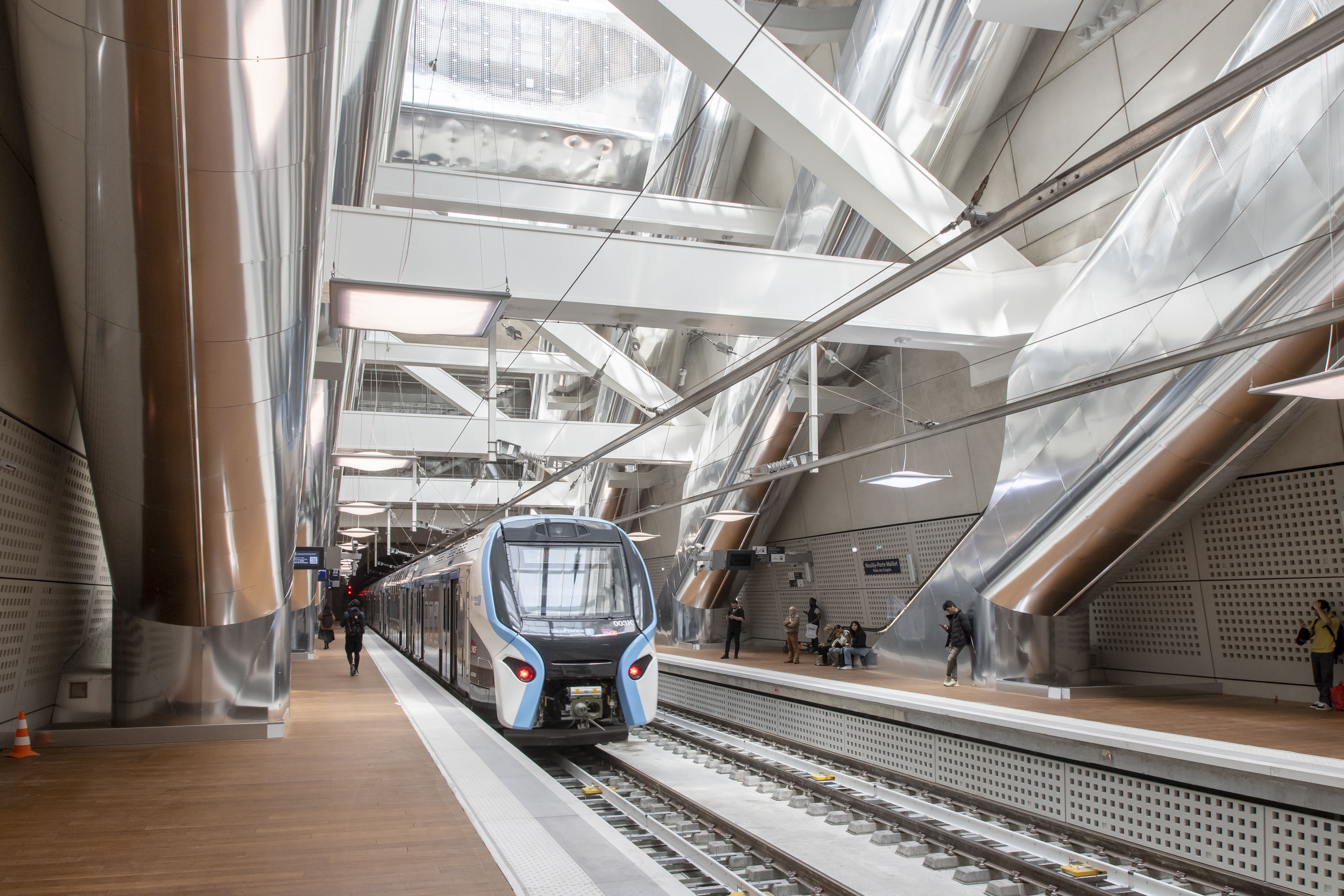
- RER E at Neuilly–Porte Maillot station

Overview
- Termini: Nanterre–La Folie (E1); Chelles–Gournay (E2), Tournan (E4)
- Connecting lines: Paris Metro Paris Metro Line 1 Paris Metro Line 2 Paris Metro Line 3 Paris Metro Line 4 Paris Metro Line 5 Paris Metro Line 9 Paris Metro Line 11 Paris Metro Line 12 Paris Metro Line 13 Paris Metro Line 14 RER RER A RER B RER C RER D Transilien Transilien Line H (Paris-Nord) Transilien Line J (Paris-Saint-Lazare) Transilien Line K (Paris-Nord) Transilien Line L (Paris-Saint-Lazare) Transilien Line P (Paris-Est) Transilien Line U Tramways in Île-de-France Île-de-France tramway Line 1 Île-de-France tramway Line 2 Île-de-France tramway Line 3b Île-de-France tramway Line 4
- Stations: 25

Service
- Type: Rapid transit/commuter rail
- System: Réseau Express Régional
- Operator: SNCF
- Rolling stock: Z 50000, Z 58000
- Ridership: 60 million journeys per year

History
- Opened: 14 July 1999; 27 years ago
- Last extension: 2024

Technical
- Line length: 60 km (37 mi)
- Track gauge: 1,435 mm (4 ft 8 1/2 in) standard gauge
- Operating speed: 120 km/h (75 mph)
Route map

RER E is one of the five lines in the Réseau Express Régional (English: Regional Express Network), a hybrid commuter rail and rapid transit system serving Paris and its suburbs. The 60-kilometre (37 mi) line travels between western and eastern suburbs, with all trains serving the stations in central Paris, before branching out towards the ends of the line.

The line runs from the western terminus Nanterre–La Folie (E1) to the eastern termini Chelles–Gournay (E2) and Tournan (E4). It is operated by SNCF. It is the most interconnected line in the Île-de-France region, with connections to all 4 other RER lines, 10 out of the 14 Metro lines (as well as 3 of the future lines of the Grand Paris Express), 6 lines of the Transilien commuter rail service, 4 Tramway lines, and hundreds of bus routes. Six of the top ten busiest train stations in France are accessible via RER E, including three of Paris' mainline stations: Gare du Nord, Gare de l'Est and Gare Saint-Lazare.

Originally referred to as the Est Ouest Liaison Express or EOLE (English: East West Express Link), RER E is the newest RER line in the system, opening in 1999. An extension to Tournan opened in 2003. The first phase of a western extension opened on 6 May 2024, extending the line to Nanterre–La Folie, with a further extension to Mantes-la-Jolie under construction and planned to open in March 2027. It served over 400,000 passengers a day as of March 2025, with expectations of 600,000 daily passengers once the extension has been completed.

== History ==
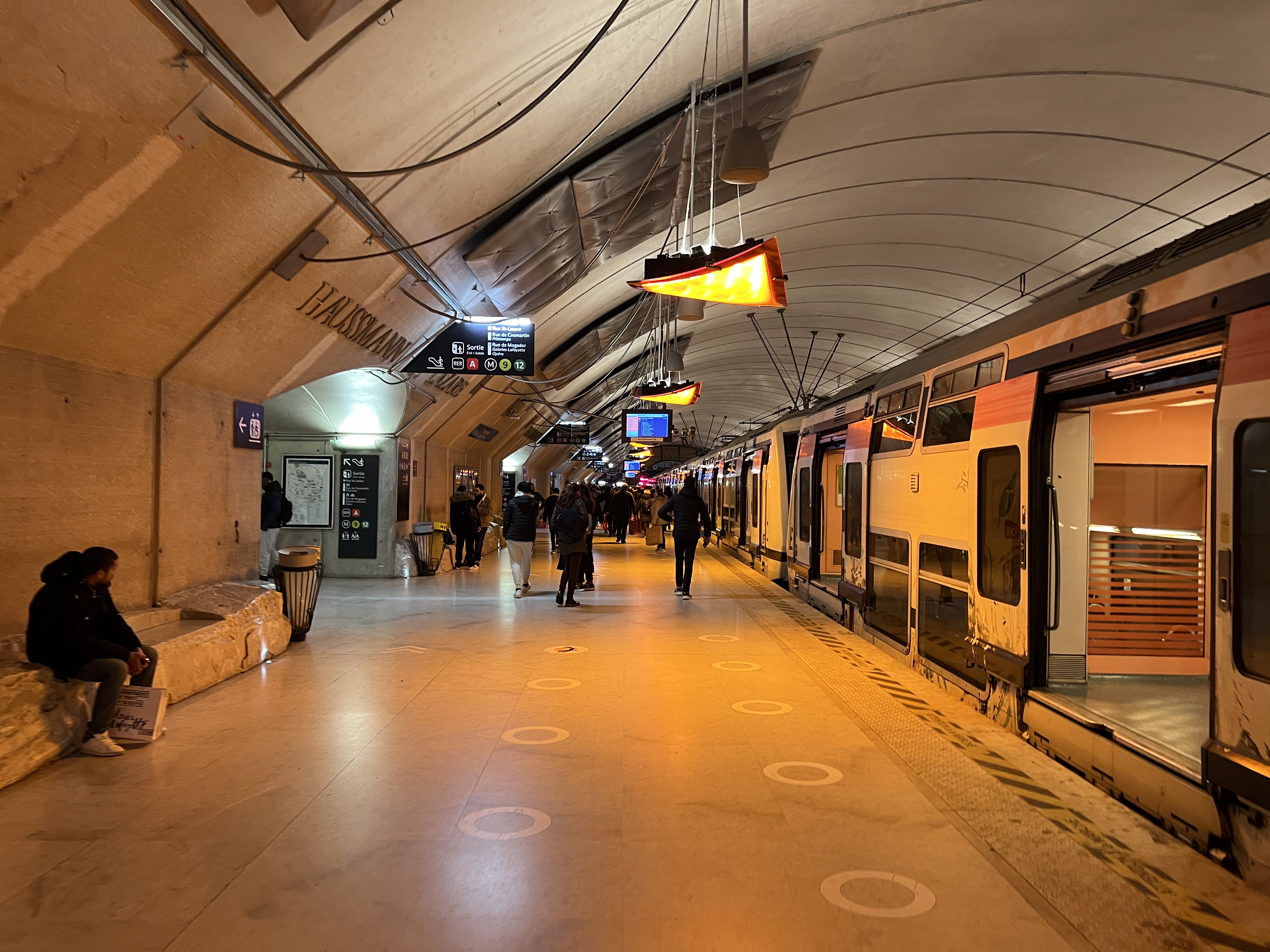
MI 2N train at Haussmann–Saint-Lazare on the RER E.

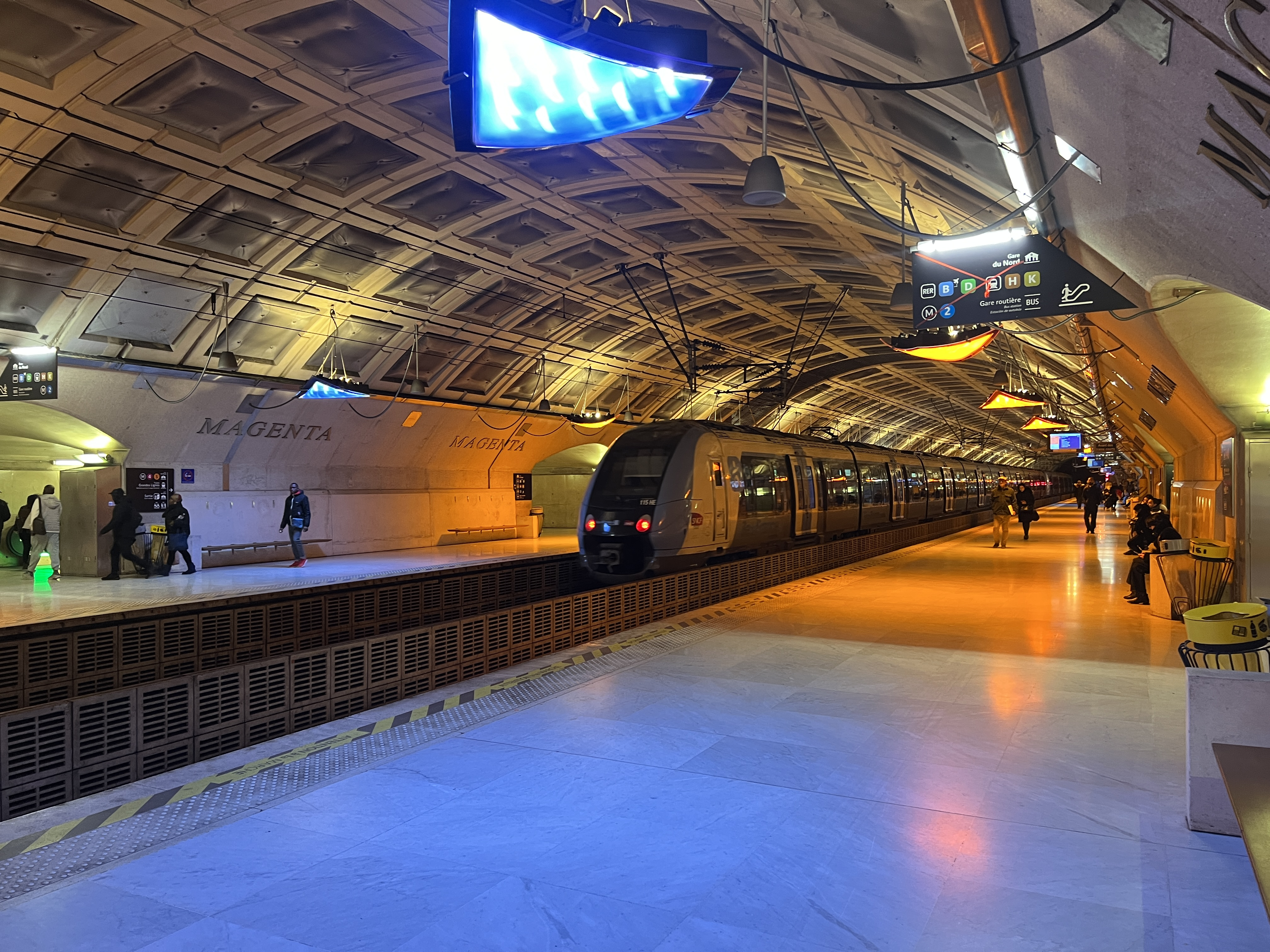
Z 50000 train departing Magenta on the RER E

RER E opened on 14 July 1999 between Haussmann–Saint-Lazare and Chelles–Gournay. The construction included a 2 km (1.2 mi) tunnel between Haussmann–St-Lazare and Magenta (which serves Gare de l'Est and Gare du Nord).

The line was first extended with a new branch from Noisy-le-Sec to Villiers-sur-Marne – Le Plessis-Trévise on 30 August 1999. This branch was extended to Tournan on 14 December 2003.

On 13 December 2015, a new Rosa Parks station opened, located in the 19th arrondissement of Paris, between the stations Magenta and Pantin.

On 6 May 2024, the first phase of a western extension opened, with three new stations: Neuilly–Porte Maillot, La Défense, and Nanterre–La Folie. The extension was initially served by a limited shuttle service between Nanterre and Magenta that operated only outside peak hours. Full service with through-running trains started on 15 December 2024.

== List of RER E stations ==
Branch	Station	Zone	Served municipalities	Major connections
E1	Nanterre–La Folie	3	Nanterre	RER RER A
E1	La Défense	3	Puteaux	Tramways in Île-de-France Île-de-France tramway Line 2 Paris Metro Paris Metro Line 1 RER RER A Transilien Transilien Line L (Paris-Saint-Lazare) Transilien Line U
E1	Neuilly–Porte Maillot	1	Paris	Tramways in Île-de-France Île-de-France tramway Line 3b Paris Metro Paris Metro Line 1 RER RER C
E1	Haussmann–Saint-Lazare	1	Paris	Paris Metro Paris Metro Line 3 Paris Metro Line 7 Paris Metro Line 8 Paris Metro Line 9 Paris Metro Line 12 Paris Metro Line 13 Paris Metro Line 14 RER RER A Transilien Transilien Line J (Paris-Saint-Lazare) Transilien Line L (Paris-Saint-Lazare) SNCF
E1	Magenta	1	Paris	Paris Metro Paris Metro Line 2 Paris Metro Line 4 Paris Metro Line 5 Paris Metro Line 7 RER RER B RER D Transilien Transilien Line H (Paris-Nord) Transilien Line K (Paris-Nord) Transilien Line P (Paris-Est) SNCF
E1	Rosa Parks	1	Paris	Tramways in Île-de-France Île-de-France tramway Line 3b
E1	Pantin	2	Pantin	
E1	Noisy-le-Sec	3	Noisy-le-Sec	Tramways in Île-de-France Île-de-France tramway Line 1
E2	Bondy	3	Bondy	Tramways in Île-de-France Île-de-France tramway Line 4
E2	Le Raincy – Villemomble – Montfermeil	4	Le Raincy, Villemomble	
E2	Gagny	4	Gagny	
E2	Le Chénay-Gagny	4	Gagny	
E2	Chelles–Gournay	4	Chelles; Gournay-sur-Marne	Transilien Transilien Line P (Paris-Est)
E4	Rosny–Bois-Perrier	3	Rosny-sous-Bois	Paris Metro Paris Metro Line 11
E4	Rosny-sous-Bois	3	Rosny-sous-Bois	
E4	Val de Fontenay	3	Fontenay-sous-Bois	RER RER A
E4	Nogent–Le Perreux	3	Nogent-sur-Marne; Le Perreux-sur-Marne	
E4	Les Boullereaux-Champigny	3	Champigny-sur-Marne	
E4	Villiers-sur-Marne–Le Plessis-Trévise	4	Villiers-sur-Marne; Le Plessis-Trévise	
E4	Les Yvris–Noisy-le-Grand	4	Noisy-le-Grand	
E4	Émerainville–Pontault-Combault	5	Émerainville; Pontault-Combault	
E4	Roissy-en-Brie	5	Roissy-en-Brie	
E4	Ozoir-la-Ferrière	5	Ozoir-la-Ferrière	
E4	Gretz-Armainvilliers	5	Gretz-Armainvilliers	
E4	Tournan	5	Tournan-en-Brie	Transilien Transilien Line P (Paris-Est)

== Map ==
Geographically accurate path of the RER E

== Operation ==
=== Names of services ===
Like all the other RER lines, each train has a mission code referring to the route it takes. The first letter designates the destination, the second indicates whether the train will call at every station or not.

- T corresponds to Tournan; V corresponds to Villiers-sur-Marne–Le Plessis-Trévise,
- C corresponds to Chelles–Gournay,
- H corresponds to Haussmann–Saint-Lazare; N corresponds to Magenta,
- M corresponds to Nanterre–La Folie.

Regular names of services of trains departing from Paris are, among others, TAVA (stops at Magenta, Rosa Parks, Pantin, Noisy-le-Sec, Val de Fontenay, and all stations from Villiers-sur-Marne to Tournan), VOHE (stops at every station, all the way to Villiers-sur-Marne), COHI (stops at every station all the way to Chelles–Gournay).

== Rolling stock ==
=== Current fleet ===
Trainset	Class	Image	Type	Top speed		Carriages	Number	Routes operated	Built
Trainset	Class	Image	Type	mph	km/h	Carriages	Number	Routes operated	Built
Bombardier Francilien	Z 50000		EMU	86	140	8	64	(equipment in common operation with line P): all branches of RER E; Haussmann–Saint-Lazare ↔ Chelles - Gournay; Haussmann–Saint-Lazare ↔ Villiers-sur-Marne - Le Plessis-Trévise; Haussmann–Saint-Lazare ↔ Tournan	2009-2022
RER NG	Z 58000		EMU	86	140	6	14	all branches of RER E; Haussmann–Saint-Lazare ↔ Chelles - Gournay; Haussmann–Saint-Lazare ↔ Villiers-sur-Marne - Le Plessis-Trévise; Haussmann–Saint-Lazare ↔ Tournan	2018-

=== Historical fleet ===
Trainset	Class	Image	Type	Top speed		Carriages	Number	In service
Trainset	Class	Image	Type	mph	km/h	Carriages	Number	In service
MI 2N	Z 22500		EMU	86	140	5	53	14 July 1999 - 10 November 2026

== Future ==
=== Western extension to Mantes-La-Jolie ===
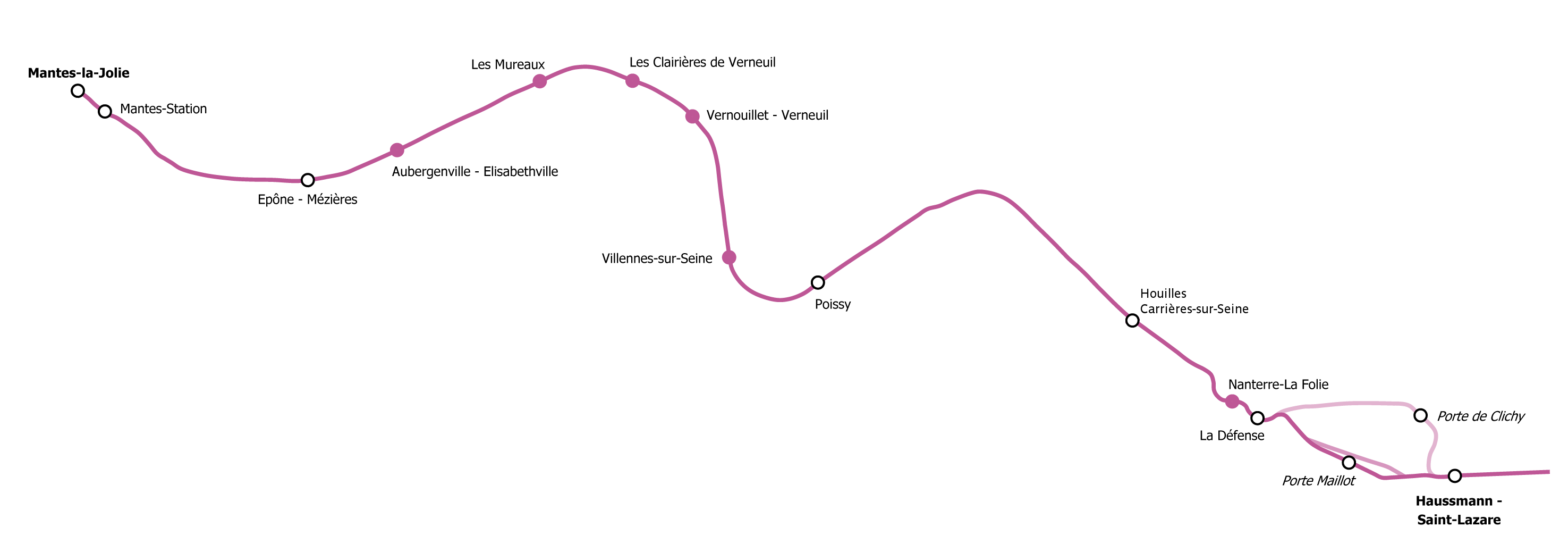
Map of the extension to Mantes-la-Jolie

RER E is currently being extended to the west of Paris, with a first phase connecting Haussmann–Saint-Lazare via La Défense to Nanterre, and second phase taking over the branch of RER A to Sartrouville and Poissy followed by a section of tracks currently carrying Transilien J to reach Mantes-la-Jolie. The first phase was expected to open by the end of 2022, with the second phase going into service in 2024. After delays, the first phase opened on 6 May 2024. As of 2022, the second phase was not expected to open before the end of 2026. In November 2024, further delays due to difficulty with implementing the new signalling system were announced, with the second phase now expected to open in early 2027 with less frequent service, and full service commencing at the end of 2029.

As part of the first phase of the extension, an eight-kilometre (5.0 mi) tunnel was dug between Haussmann–St-Lazare and La Défense. An intermediate station at Porte Maillot offers a transfer to Métro line 1, RER C, and tramway line T3b. The extension is expected to reduce the load on the central sections of RER B and RER D (between Gare du Nord and Châtelet) and RER A (between La Défense and Auber) by 10–15%. Additionally, transfers will be shifted away from current transfer hub Châtelet in the city center.

=== Villiers–Champigny–Bry infill station ===
A new station on the RER E will open in 2030, between the Les Boullereaux-Champigny and Villiers-sur-Marne–Le Plessis-Trévise stations on the Tournan branch to connect with the southern section of Paris Métro Line 15 of the Grand Paris Express.

It will be located north of Chemin des Boutareines, near the bridge over which the future Altival exclusive right-of-way bus will cross the RER E tracks. The Grand Paris Express station platforms will be at a depth of -21 m.

Located south of Bry-sur-Marne and the A4 autoroute in Villiers-sur-Marne, the station will serve the equestrian center, the Maisons Rouges business park, the Armoiries and Boutareines ZACs. Users will benefit from numerous shops and services. Infrastructure studies are underway for a period of 13–14 months with funding. These studies will define the nature of the work and the schedule to be respected. The station's location is a complicated issue, as there are currently only two tracks (between Les Boullereaux and Villiers - Le Plessis-Trévise) at this point, where many trains cross each other. A public inquiry phase will follow in 2014.

Initial studies carried out by Réseau ferré de France (RFF) in conjunction with Société du Grand Paris (SGP) show that the additional stops for all trains on the line, as well as any Transilien Line P services at the station, would require a four-track upgrade between Villiers-Champigny-Bry and Villiers-sur-Marne, at an estimated cost of €200 million at 2010 economic conditions, excluding the cost of constructing the passenger building. Rolling stock requirements have not yet been assessed.

The Syndicat des transports d'Île-de-France (STIF, now Île-de-France Mobilités) requested that the current studies include conditions for stopping the two Line P services (Coulommiers and Provins services.)

However, if the Villiers to Roissy-en-Brie services were to be extended, only a third track would be required between the new Villiers - Champigny - Bry station and Villiers-sur-Marne, extending to Émerainville. The work cost would then be halved to €100 million, excluding the cost of constructing the passenger building, at 2010 economic conditions.

The station was the subject of a consultation in June 2016, and its cost is estimated at €348 million.

Construction of the station was declared to be in the public interest on 18 December 2018, following a public inquiry from 4 June to 6 July 2018.

=== Eastern extension of the Tournan branch to Val Bréon ===
==== History ====
At the end of the 2000s, the Region's work on the master plan for the Île-de-France region (SDRIF) opened up the prospect of the next fifteen years. One project caught the attention of elected officials: the eastern extension of the line's Tournan branch from Tournan station to the Val Bréon logistics center at Châtres. In 2007, several possible locations for the future station were studied, evaluated, and compared. Some of the proposals studied were rejected. In some cases, personal interests got in the way and interfered with the general interest approach, which did not make the analysis easy but did not prevent it.

In 2008, for example, there were two opposing options: either doubling the track from Tournan to Marles-en-Brie, which would become the new RER E terminus after redevelopment or creating a terminus in the heart of the business park using existing freight tracks, the option advocated by the SNCF. At the time, nothing had been decided by the Communauté de communes du Val Bréon. In July 2009, the newspaper Le Pays briard confirmed that the extension would soon be completed.

On May 19, 2010, SNCF CEO Guillaume Pepy and local elected representatives visited the Val Bréon site, where the new eastern terminus is to be built, the possibility of extending the line to Marles-en-Brie having been ruled out. Pepy stated about the project, "it's a fine, interesting project, which makes sense from a rail point of view, with improved quality of service at its heart," which therefore deserves "to be considered. It was also part of a broad agreement between the regional council, RFF, SNCF, and STIF (now Île-de-France Mobilités)."

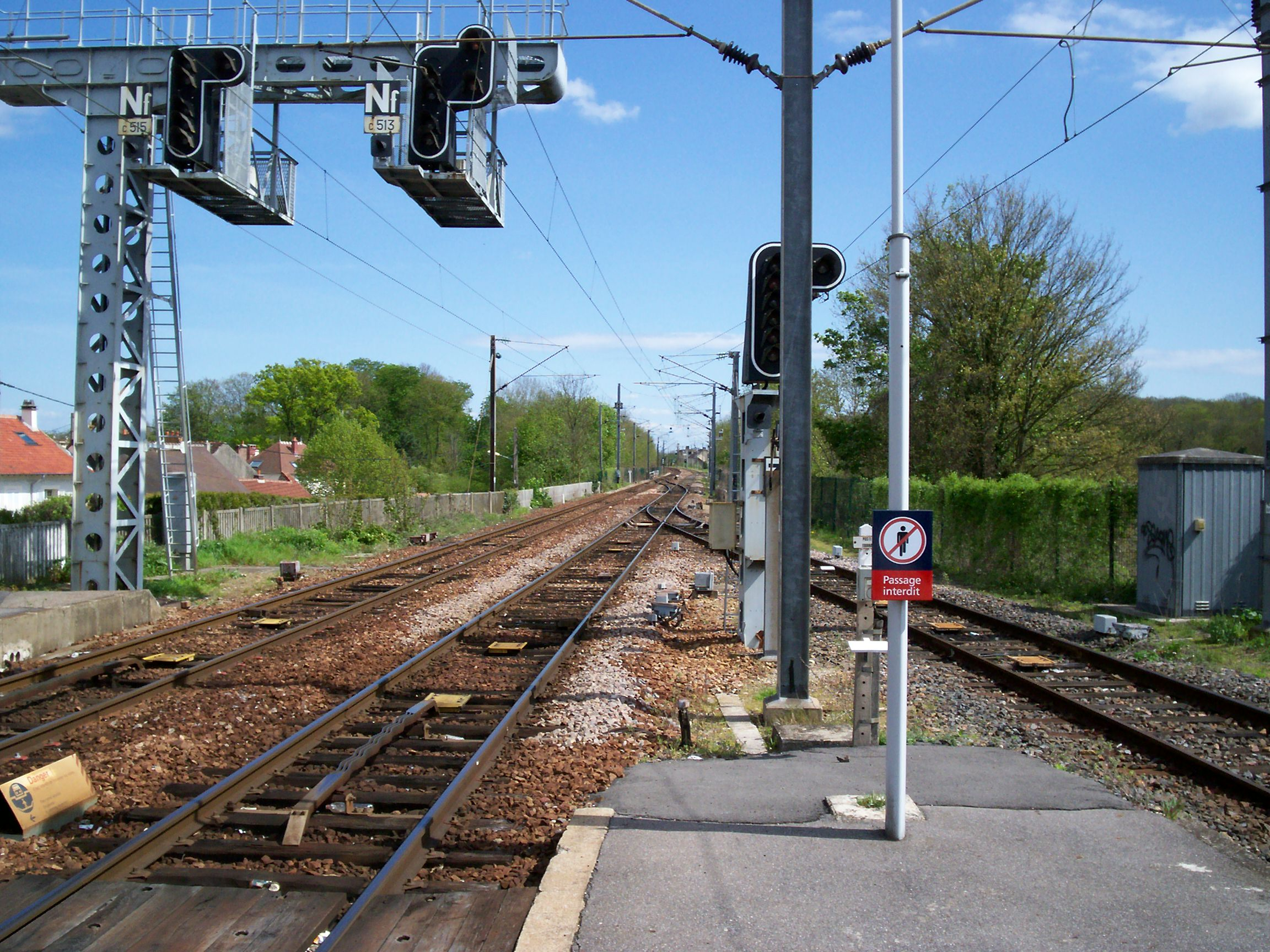
Facing east towards Val Bréon from Tournan station in April 2008

==== Project overview ====
The project involves extending the RER E line from Tournan station to Val Bréon, one of the largest logistics centers in the Île-de-France. This business park boasts vast warehouses that house brands such as Conforama, IKEA, and Castorama. It is home to over 1,000 jobs. The sector plan calls into question the relevance of this extension. This extension is now expected to be completed in 2030.

This extension would make it possible to create a service in line with the development of this area, which is only accessible by car and where the number of employees could increase, as well as resolving the RER line's operating difficulties by creating a new site for parking trains and relieving the Gretz-Armainvilliers and Tournan stations of cars arriving from the east of the département: "According to the mayor of Tournan-en-Brie: "The outskirts of the town are clogged: cars arrive in the morning and leave again in the evening, a daily problem for locals. The current terminus attracts passengers from a radius of around 50 km (31 mi), taking advantage of the fact that RER E runs to the center of Paris. Once the line has been extended to the west of Paris, this number is set to increase. The 3.5 km (2.2 mi) extension would terminate at the Val Bréon station, which Vincent Éblé, then president of the Departmental Council of Seine-et-Marne, described as an "experimental station for the 21st century", i.e. of a new type, not only architecturally but also environmentally. It would be multimodal, environmentally friendly, accessible by bike and bus, and innovative in its functions, not just as a transport hub. It will also offer its passengers various services, including childcare and concierge. There will also be a post office, library, and shops.

This project, the result of an agreement between local elected representatives, the Île-de-France region, Réseau ferré de France (now SNCF Réseau), Syndicat des transports d'Île-de-France (now Île-de-France Mobilités) and SNCF, is under study. It would cost between €40 million and €60 million. Vincent Eblé acknowledges at least one weakness in this project: "The Val Bréon area is not easily accessible by public transport. So we need to work together to improve access to Val Bréon. We have considered two bus service projects with the communauté de communes This extension would be in everyone's interest (businesses, residents, users and the SNCF): "The perfect example of a development that reconciles mobility, sustainable development and economic development." The new station would also make RER E more attractive, creating a "pull" for users, since, according to Vincent Eblé, "any improvement in service translates into greater attractiveness". According to Guillaume Pepy, the RER E would not be saturated, so this attractiveness should not be a problem. However, studies carried out as part of the sector plan showed that, given the traffic constraints on the whole of Transilien Line P (between Paris and Tournan-en-Brie), the nine trains (in both directions) that could run per peak hour between Tournan and Val Bréon would require doubling the track on this section of the line, at an estimated cost of around €100 million at 2010 economic conditions. Finally, they highlighted that this extension does not theoretically offer significant traffic potential.

=== Eastern extension of the Chelles–Gournay branch to Meaux ===
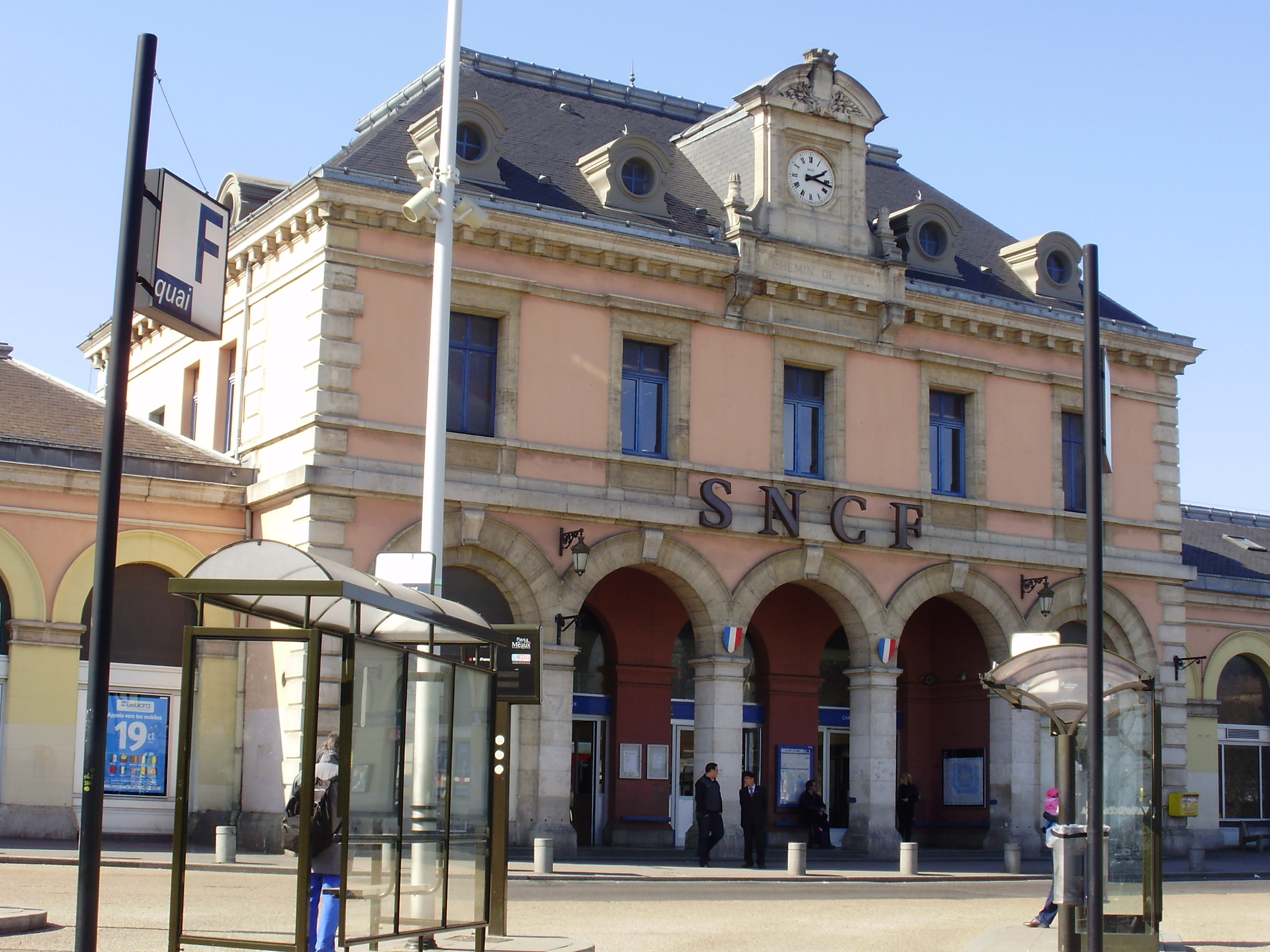
Meaux station in March 2011

The eastward extension of branch E2, which currently terminates at Chelles-Gournay station, to Meaux station, with intermediate stops at Vaires–Torcy, Lagny–Thorigny, and Esbly, is included in Phase 3 (2021-2027) of the Schéma directeur de la région Île-de-France (SDRIF), adopted by deliberation of the Regional Council of Île-de-France on 25 September 2008. However, the sector plan calls into question the relevance of this project. The project is currently planned to open around 2030.

Extending RER E to Meaux would provide better service to this town, which, with over 50,000 inhabitants, is the most densely populated in the department of Seine-et-Marne. This project would improve service to the north of the department, particularly the new town of Marne-la-Vallée, with a second significant public transport line to complement RER A. It would give users of the current Meaux terminus link from Paris (Transilien Line P) direct access to the Magenta, Haussmann–Saint-Lazare, Porte Maillot and La Défense transfer hubs. On the other hand, depending on the number of stops, the RER E service could take longer to reach Paris than Line P trains.

However, the sector plan studies highlighted that mixing RER E and Transport express régional (TER) traffic between Chelles (or Lagny with additional tracks) and Meaux would be a source of conflict, and that access to the RER E tunnel without connections would not result in a gain in journey time between Meaux and Haussmann (estimated at 42 minutes by direct train). Finally, they highlighted that creating a pedestrian link between Gare de l'Est and Gare du Nord would significantly facilitate connections between Line P and RER E. As a result, STIF (now Île-de-France Mobilités) was planning to carry out further studies to assess the benefits of creating a pedestrian link.

==== Extension to the Val d'Europe area ====
In addition to extending the Chelles branch to Meaux station, the 1994 Schéma directeur de la région Île-de-France proposed a new, short eastern branch of RER E to sector IV (Val d'Europe) of the new town of Marne-la-Vallée. This branch would have terminated at Marne-la-Vallée–Chessy station and would have facilitated a new connection with the Marne-la-Vallée A4 branch of the RER A and the TGV station; it would also have provided better access to Disneyland Paris. Service to the Val d'Europe and Disneyland Paris would have been improved by a second RER line from Paris, notably from Magenta station, providing access to the eponymous complex without having to pass through Châtelet–Les Halles and/or Val de Fontenay stations.

This proposal to extend the RER E to Marne-la-Vallée–Chessy station has never been taken up again since the SDRIF updates and has not been the subject of any studies.
