= Nanterre–La Folie station =

Railway station in Paris

Nanterre La Folie
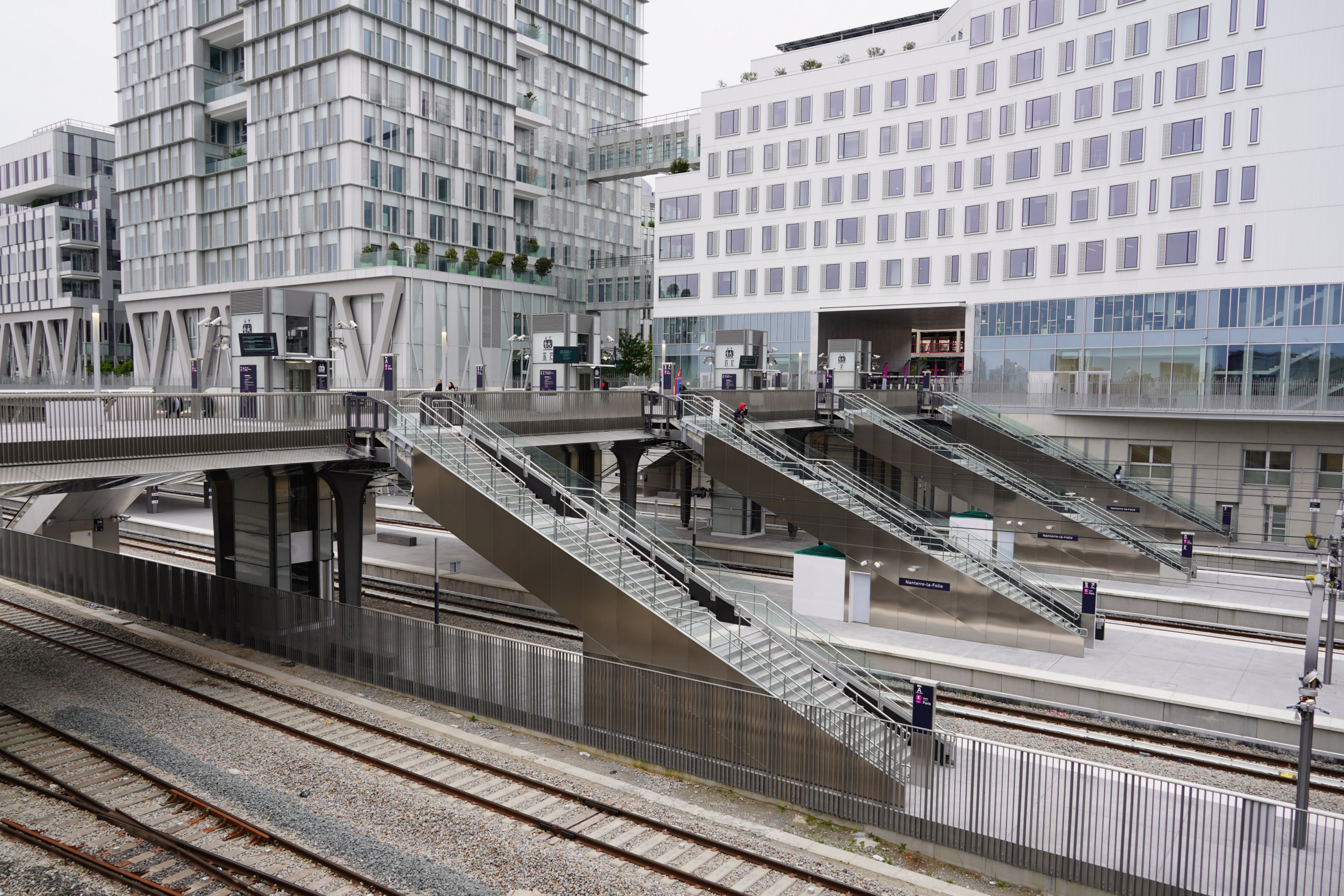
- Platforms two days after opening

General information
- Location: Nanterre; France
- Coordinates: 48°53′56″N 2°13′17″E
- Operator: SNCF
- Platforms: 2 island platforms, 2 side platforms
- Tracks: 6 + 3 service tracks
- Connections: at Nanterre-Préfecture

Construction
- Accessible: Yes, by prior reservation

Other information
- Station code: 87386011
- Fare zone: 3

History
- Opened: 6 May 2024

Services
Preceding station	RER	Following station
Terminus	RER E	La Défense towards Chelles–Gournay or Tournan

Future services
Preceding station	RER	Following station
Houilles–Carrières-sur-Seine towards Mantes-la-Jolie	RER E (2027)	La Défense towards Chelles–Gournay or Tournan
Preceding station	Paris Metro	Following station
Nanterre–La Boule towards Noisy–Champs	Line 15 (2030)	La Défense towards Champigny Centre
Connections to other stations
Preceding station	RER	Following station
Nanterre-Université towards Saint-Germain-en-Laye	RER A transfer at Nanterre-Préfecture	La Défense towards Boissy-Saint-Léger or Marne-la-Vallée–Chessy
Houilles–Carrières-sur-Seine towards Cergy-le-Haut or Poissy	RER A transfer at Nanterre-Préfecture	La Défense towards Boissy-Saint-Léger or Marne-la-Vallée–Chessy
Location

Nanterre La Folie (French pronunciation: [nɑ̃tɛʁ la fɔli]) is a railway station in Nanterre, Hauts-de-Seine, France. Formerly, the area contained a cargo station of SNCF. It was built as part of the extension of RER E from Haussmann–Saint-Lazare station and opened on 6 May 2024, and acts as its western terminus. From 2027, RER E will be further extended to Mantes-la-Jolie. The station connects via a short walk with the Nanterre-Préfecture station on the RER A.

From 2030, Nanterre La Folie will also be a station on Line 15 of the Grand Paris Express extension of the Paris Metro. The station is being constructed on an adjacent plot and will be connected to the RER station by an underground corridor.

An extension of Line 18 from Versailles Chantiers to terminate at Nanterre La Folie has been proposed for construction after 2030, and a possible extension of Line 17 from Saint-Denis–Pleyel appeared on early plans of the Grand Paris Express project. A proposed future Line 19 would also terminate at Nanterre–La Folie and connect it to Charles de Gaulle airport via Argenteuil and Garges-lès-Gonesse.
