= Roissy-en-Brie station =

Railway station in Roissy-en-Brie, France

Roissy-en-Brie
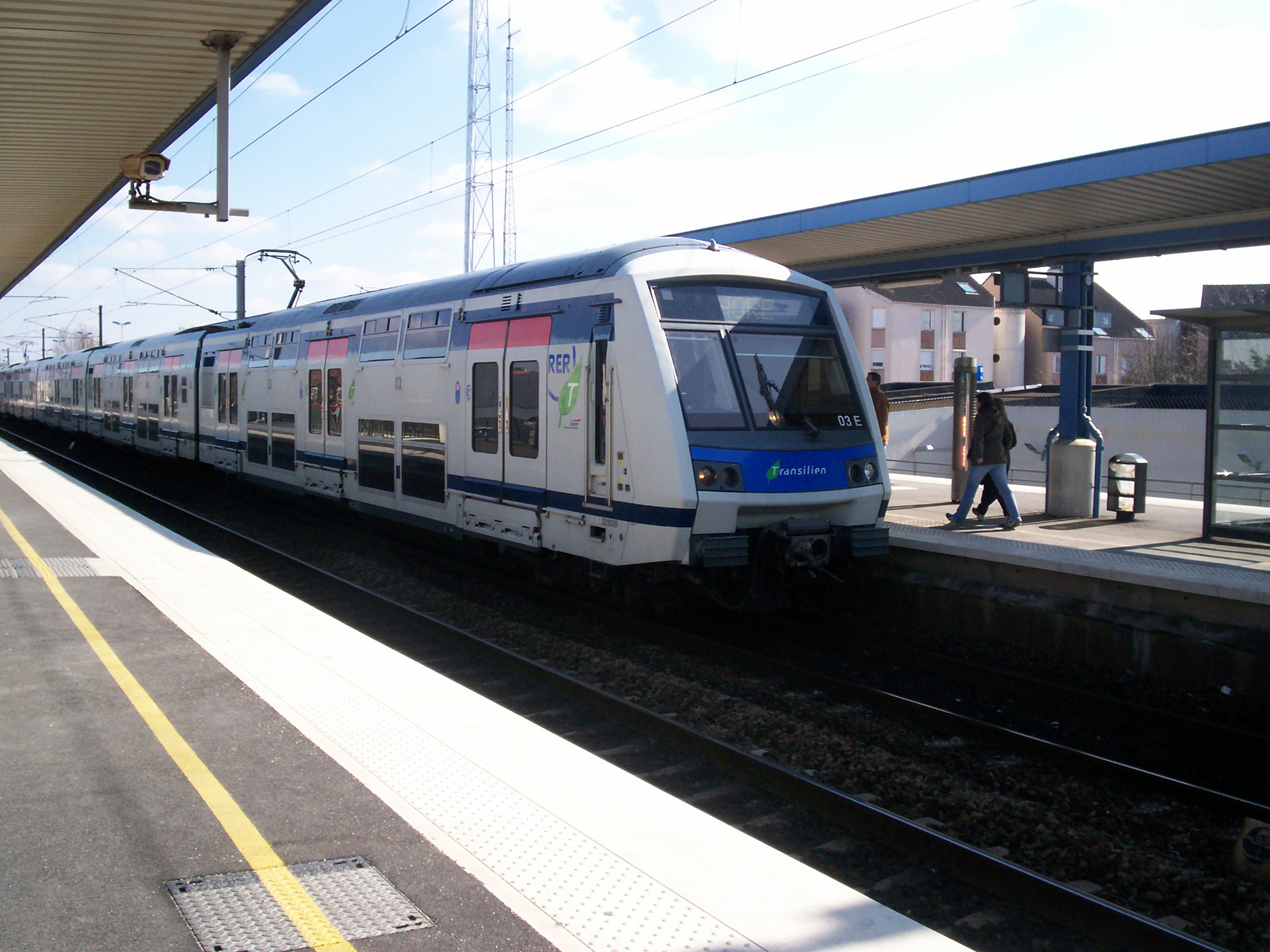
- RER E train at Roissy-en-Brie in 2006

General information
- Location: Place de la Gare; 77680 Roissy-en-Brie; France
- Coordinates: 48.795674°N 2.65029°E
- Owner: SNCF
- Operator: SNCF
- Line: Paris-Est–Mulhouse-Ville railway
- Platforms: 2
- Tracks: 4
- Connections: Sit'bus: 501A, A, D, E; Noctilien: N142

Construction
- Accessible: Yes, by prior reservation

Other information
- Station code: 87116038
- Fare zone: 5

History
- Opened: 9 February 1857

Passengers
- 2024: 3,378,810

Services
Preceding station	RER	Following station
Émerainville–Pontault-Combault towards Nanterre–La Folie	RER E	Ozoir-la-Ferrière towards Tournan
Location

Roissy-en-Brie is a French railway station in Roissy-en-Brie, in the Seine-et-Marne department in the Île-de-France region. It is served by RER E.

== Location ==
The station is at kilometric point 29.880 of the Paris-Est–Mulhouse-Ville railway. Its altitude is 109 m.

== History ==
The Chemins de fer de l'Est company put into service Roissy-en-Brie station on 9 February 1857, as the section from Nogent–Le Perreux to Nangis opens to commercial service. That section opens with a single track; the second one is put into service on 23 April. The next section, from Nangis to Flamboin, opens on 25 April 1857.

In 2000, a contract between the State and the Île-de-France region organised the expansion of RER E from Villiers-sur-Marne–Le Plessis-Trévise to Tournan. On 14 February 2002, the STIF board of directors approves of the pilot. On 14 December 2003, the line is cut from its historical network to Paris-Est, and linked with RER E leading to Haussmann–Saint-Lazare. That integration modify journeys and timetables, and improves the station services. Platforms are raised from 0.55 metres (1.80 ft) to 0.92 metres (3.02 ft) to facilitate access to the carriages. Facilities improve accessibility to people with limited mobility. Screens on the platforms show real time information.

== Service ==
=== Facilities ===
As a Transilien network station, commercial services are available everyday, as well as facilities and assistance to people with limited mobility. The station is equipped with vending machines for Transilien and main lines tickets, and with real time traffic information system. A tobacco shop and several facilities are present, such as a photo booth and a vending machine proposing drinks and sweets.

A car park and a bike park are set next to the station.

=== Train service ===
Roissy-en-Brie is served by RER E trains in both directions by one train every 30 minutes off-peak and in the evening. It is served by two to four trains an hour during peak times.

=== Connections ===
The station is served by Sit'bus lines 501A, A, D and E, and by Noctilien night line N142.
