= Émerainville–Pontault-Combault station =

Railway station in Émerainville, France

Émerainville Pontault-Combault
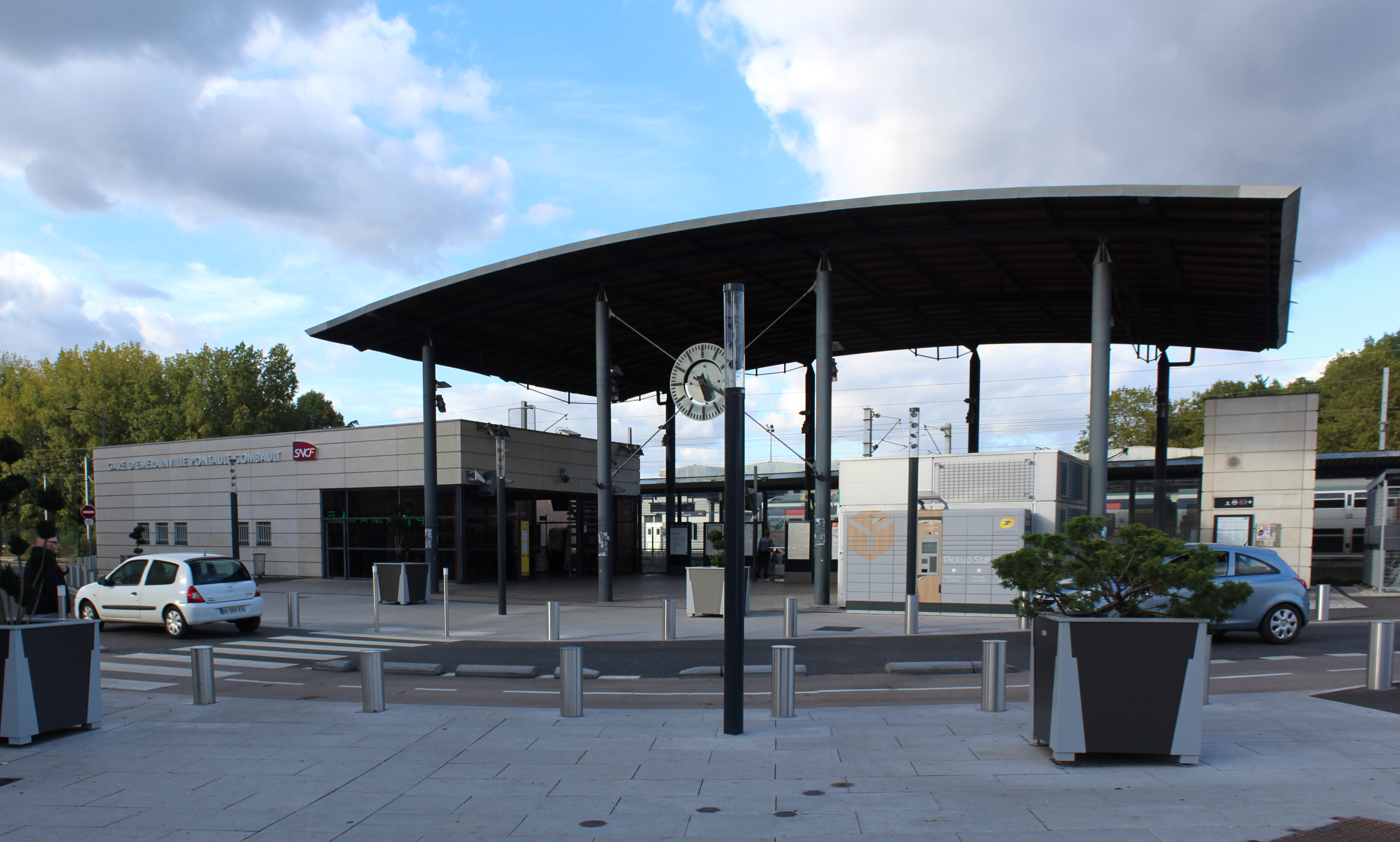
- Station entrance in Pontault-Combault

General information
- Location: Émerainville; France
- Coordinates: 48.806194°N 2.618125°E
- Owner: SNCF
- Operator: SNCF
- Line: Paris-Est–Mulhouse-Ville railway
- Platforms: 2
- Tracks: 4
- Connections: RATP Bus: 206 212 421; Seine-et-Marne Express: 18; Sit'bus: A, B, C, D; SITUS: 2; Noctilien: N142

Construction
- Accessible: Yes, by prior reservation

Other information
- Station code: 87116046
- Fare zone: 5

History
- Opened: 9 February 1857; 169 years ago

Passengers
- 2024: 4,664,593

Services
Preceding station	RER	Following station
Les Yvris–Noisy-le-Grand towards Nanterre–La Folie	RER E	Roissy-en-Brie towards Tournan
Location

Émerainville–Pontault-Combault is a French railway station on the Paris-Est–Mulhouse-Ville railway, located in Émerainville, Seine-et-Marne department, Île-de-France region. It bears the name of Pontault-Combault as its territory reaches the south and the west of the building. It serves a district of Marne-la-Vallée.

The station was put into service on 9 February 1857, by the Compagnie des chemins de fer de l'Est, when the section from Nogent–Le Perreux to Nangis opens. It is a SNCF station served by RER E trains.

== Location ==
Émerainville–Pontault-Combault station, whose elevation is 109 meters (358 ft), is located at kilometric point 27.224 of the Paris–Mulhouse railway, between Les Yvris–Noisy-le-Grand and Roissy-en-Brie stations.

== History ==
=== Evolution of Émerainville station ===
The Est company put in operation Émerainville station at the opening of the section from Nogent–Le Perreux to Nangis to commercial service. That section opens with only one track; the second is put into service on 23 April 1857.

In 2000, a contract between the State and the Île-de-France region organised the expansion of RER E from Villiers-sur-Marne–Le Plessis-Trévise to Tournan. On 14 February 2002, the STIF board of directors approves of the pilot. On 14 December 2003, the line is cut from its historical network to Paris-Est and linked with RER E leading to Haussmann–Saint Lazare. That integration modify journeys and timetables; it improves the station services. Platforms are raised from 0.55 metres (1.80 ft) to 0.92 metres (3.02 ft) to facilitate access to the carriages. Facilities improve accessibility to people with limited mobility. Screens on the platforms show real time information.

=== Branch to Menier factory in Noisiel ===
From 1883 to 1959, the station was the start of a private standard gauge railway serving Menier Chocolate factory in Noisiel. It measured 10 km, including a 1.6 km section inside the factory. It included a branch serving La Ferme du Buisson cultural center. It was fully in the Menier family domain and included five railroad crossings.

=== Branch to Pariest industrial park ===
Menier branch was then refurbished with a marshalling yard in Émerainville and an extension to the west, with a unique track, along A4 autoroute and rounding Lognes–Émerainville aerodrome, then heading to Pariest industrial park in Lognes. That is a 7.5 km track serving Seita and SEVM companies, carrying 118000 tons of freight a year. The line is disused in 2005 as the two companies move and the line manager refuse to pay for the maintenance.

== Service ==
=== Facilities ===
As a Transilien network station, commercial services are available everyday, as well as facilities and assistance to people with limited mobility. The station is equipped with vending machines for Transilien and main lines tickets, and with real time traffic information system. Several facilities are present, such as a press booth and a vending machine proposing drinks and sweets.

=== Train service ===
The station is served in both directions by one train every 30 minutes off-peak and in the evening. It is served by two to four trains an hour during peak times.

=== Connections ===
Several car parks are set nearby.

The station is also served by bus companies:

- SITUS line 2
- Seine-et-Marne Express line 18
- RATP Group lines 206, 212 and 421
- Sit'bus lines A, B, C and D
- Noctilien night line N142

== Gallery ==
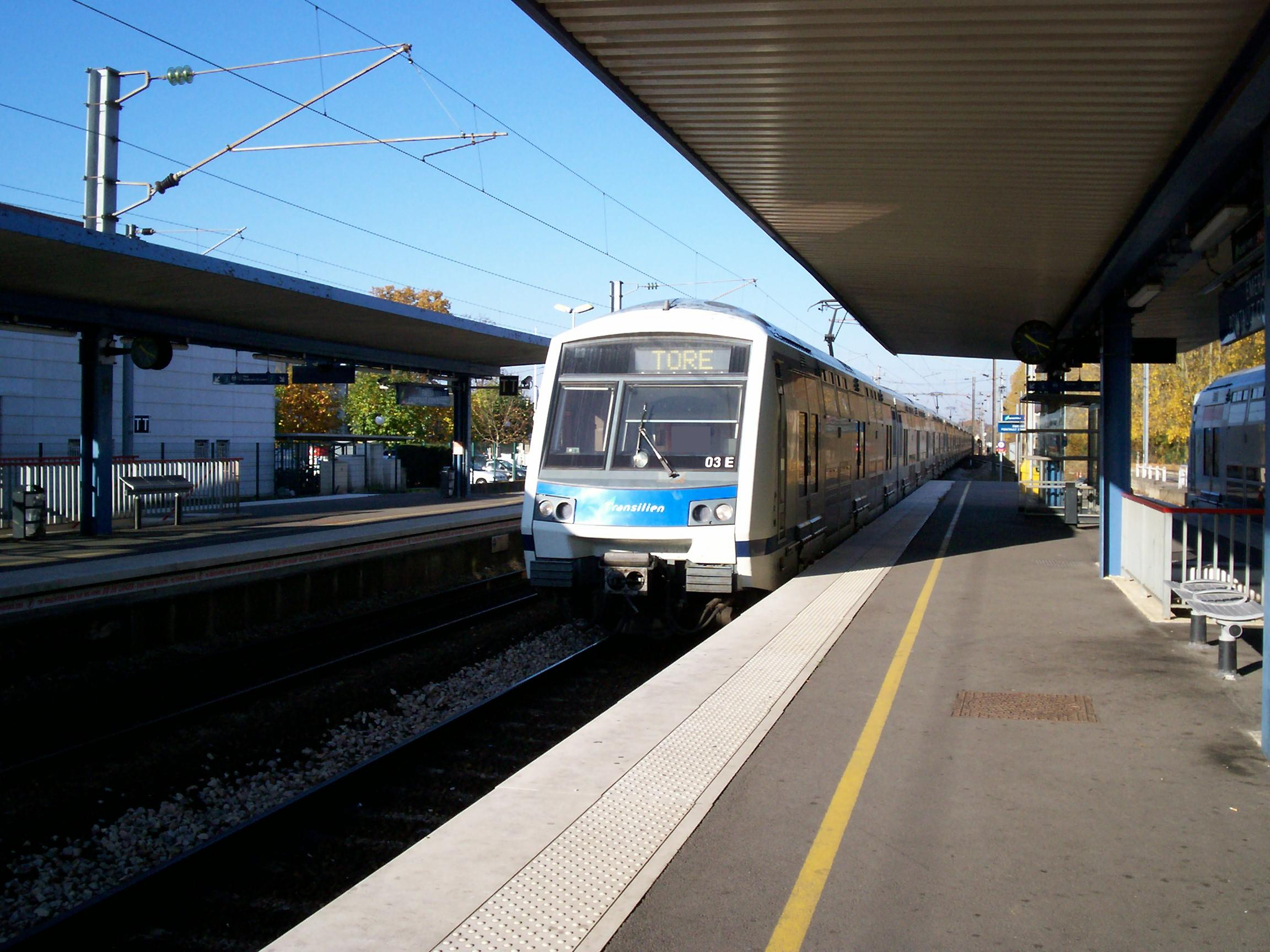
Train arriving in Émerainville station toward Tournan

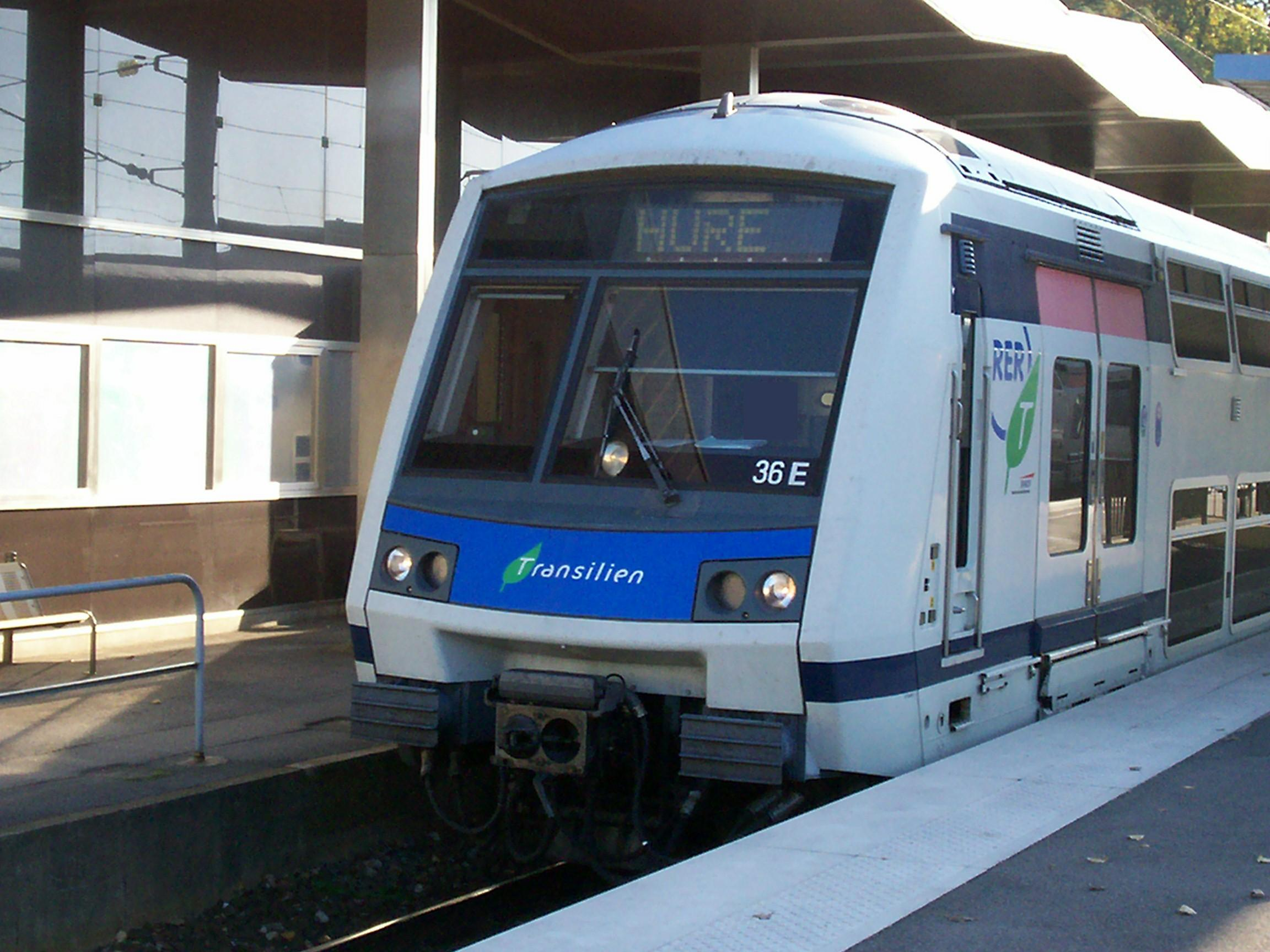
Train leaving Émerainville toward Haussmann–Saint-Lazare

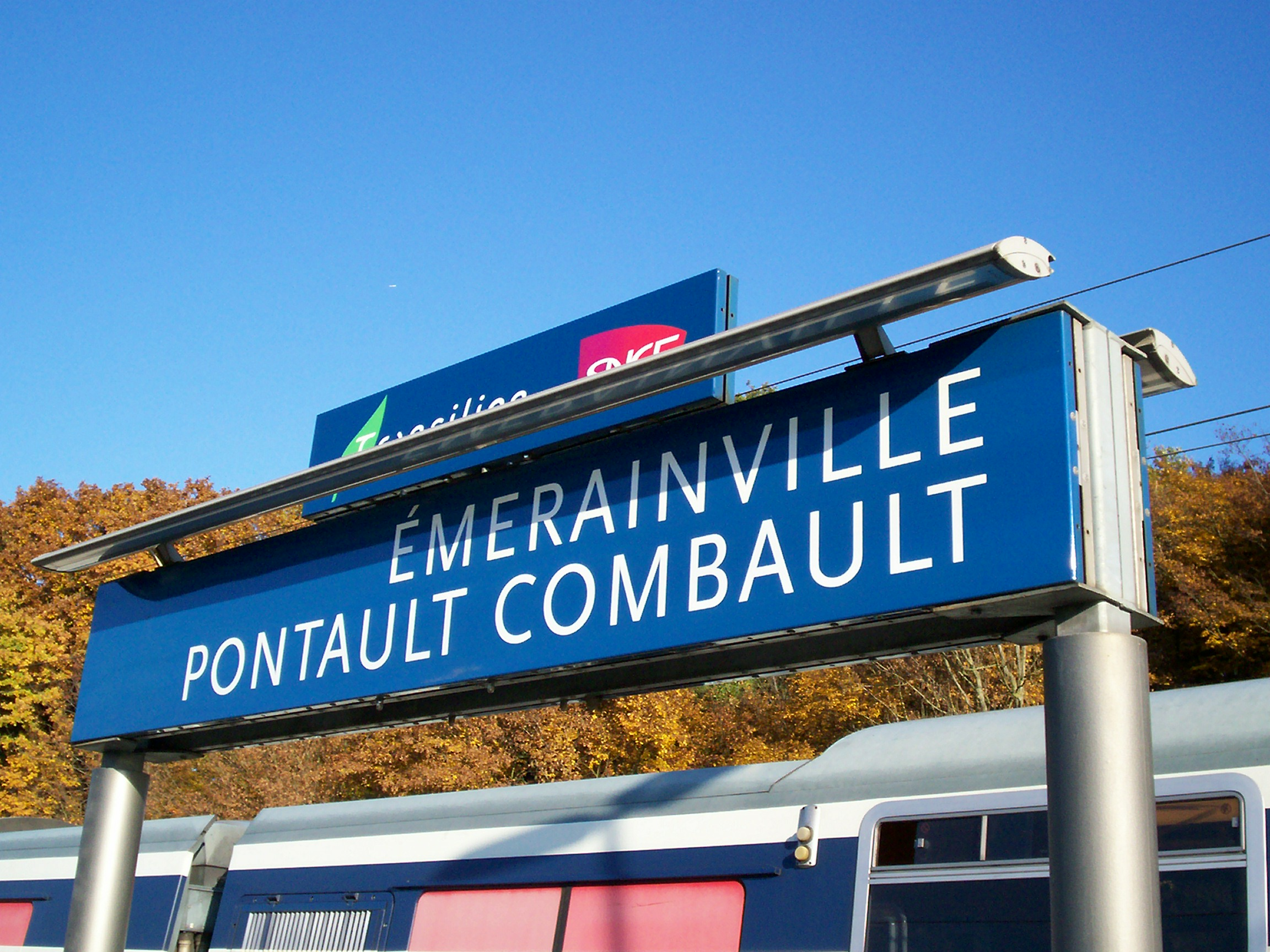
Sign in the station

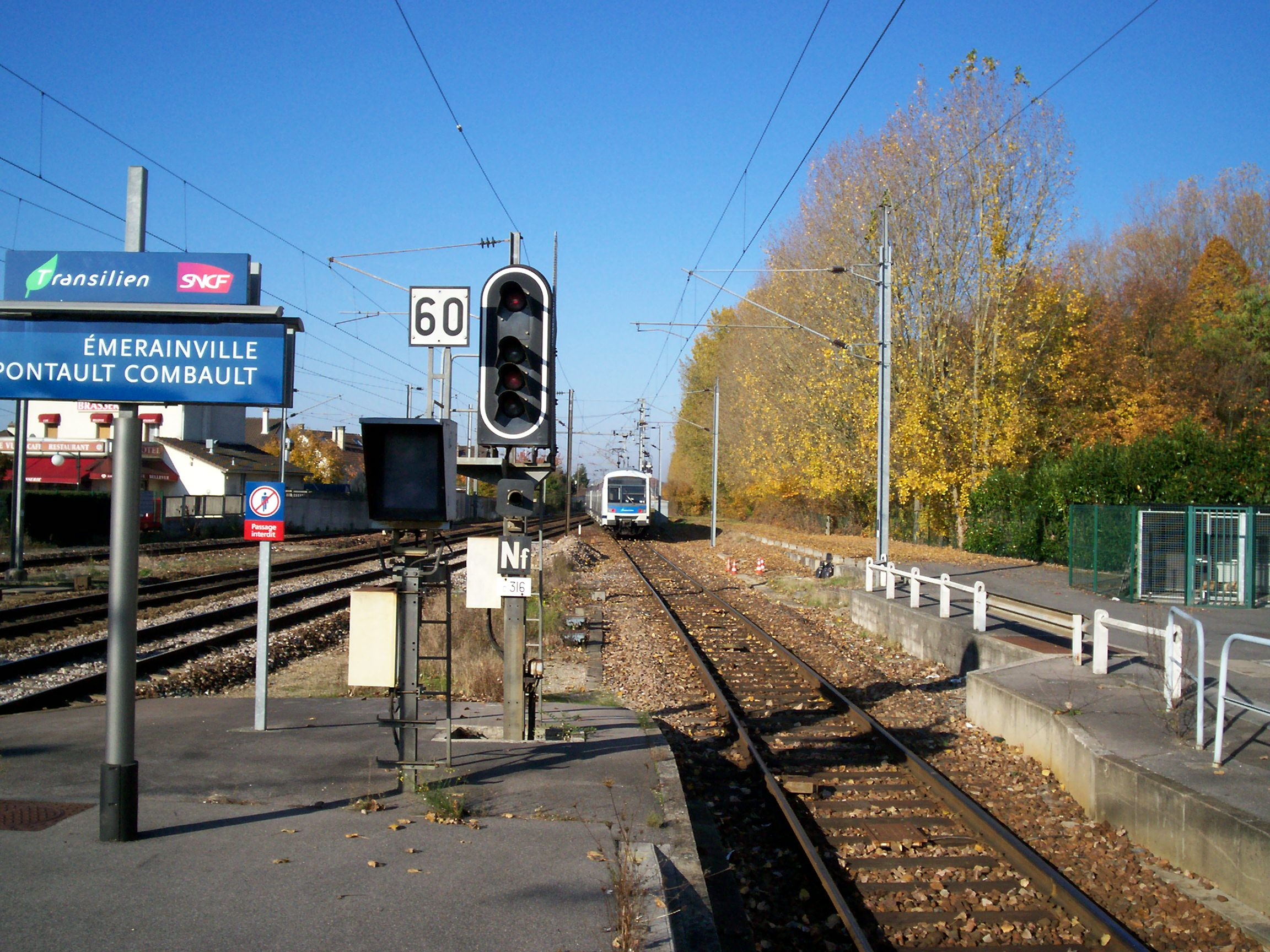
A train on the junction of slow and direct tracks

== See also ==
- List of stations of the Paris RER
- Paris-Est–Mulhouse-Ville railway
- RER E

== Bibliography ==
- Plancke, René-Charles (1991). Histoire du chemin de fer de Seine-et-Marne : tome I de la vapeur au TGV. Le Mée-sur-Seine: Amatteis. ISBN 978-2868491053.
