= Rosny-sous-Bois station =

Railway station in Rosny-sous-Bois, France

Rosny-sous-Bois
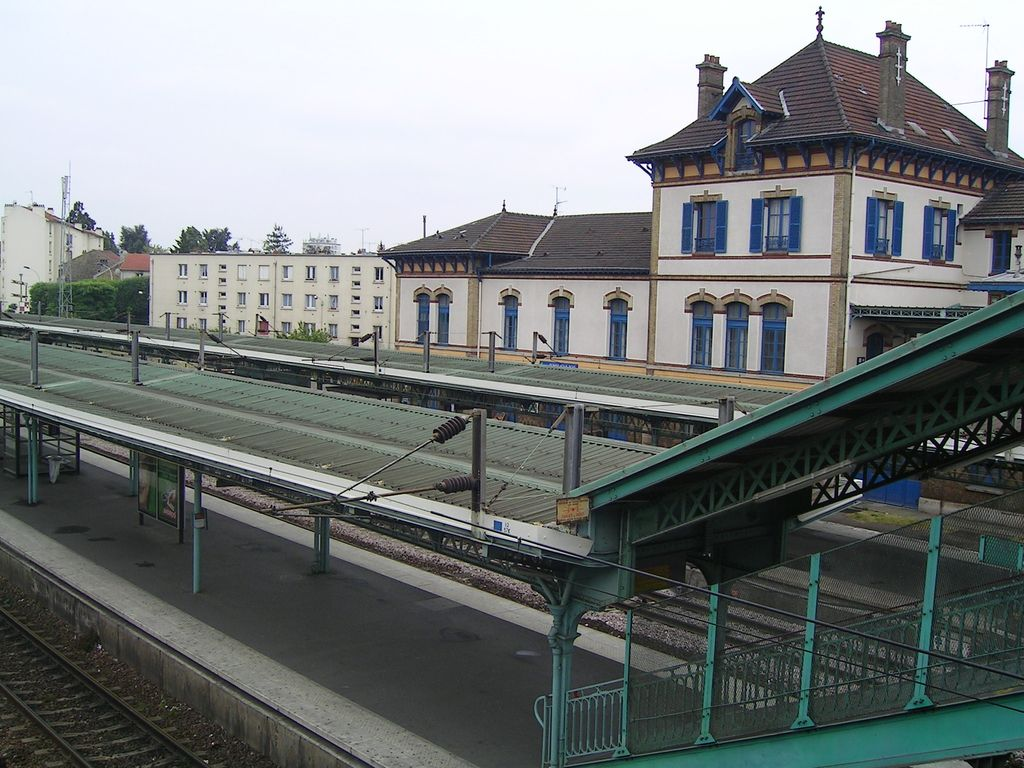
- Gate and passengers building

General information
- Coordinates: 48°52′15″N 2°29′08″E
- Owner: SNCF
- Line: Paris-Est–Mulhouse-Ville railway
- Connections: RATP Bus: 116 118 143; Titus: 1, 2, 3, 4; Noctilien: N142

Construction
- Accessible: Yes, by prior reservation

Other information
- Station code: 87113704
- Fare zone: 3

History
- Opened: 1856
- Rebuilt: 1912
- Former names: Rosny-sous-Bois–Neuilly-Plaisance

Passengers
- 2024: 6,290,410

Services
| Preceding station | RER | Following station |
|---|---|---|
| Rosny–Bois-Perrier towards Nanterre–La Folie | RER E | Val de Fontenay towards Tournan |
Location

Rosny-sous-Bois is a French railway station in Rosny-sous-Bois, Seine-Saint-Denis département, in Île-de-France region.

== Location ==
The station is at kilometric point 12.631 of Paris-Mulhouse railway. Its altitude is 69 m.

== Service ==
=== Facilities ===
The counter in the building is open every day. The station is equipped with automatic ticket machines, real time traffic information systems and facilities for disabled people.

=== Train service ===
Rosny-sous-Bois is served by RER E trains coming from or bound to Villiers-sur-Marne. Trains from or bound to Tournan call at the station only after 10 pm. The average waiting time in both directions is 15 minutes.

=== Connections ===
The station is served by:

- RATP bus lines 116, 118 and 143
- Noctilien night bus line N142
- Titus bus lines 1, 2, 3 and 4

== Museum ==
The station hosts Rosny-Rail, a local railway museum.
