= Val de Fontenay station =

Railway station in Fontenay-sous-Bois, France

Val de Fontenay
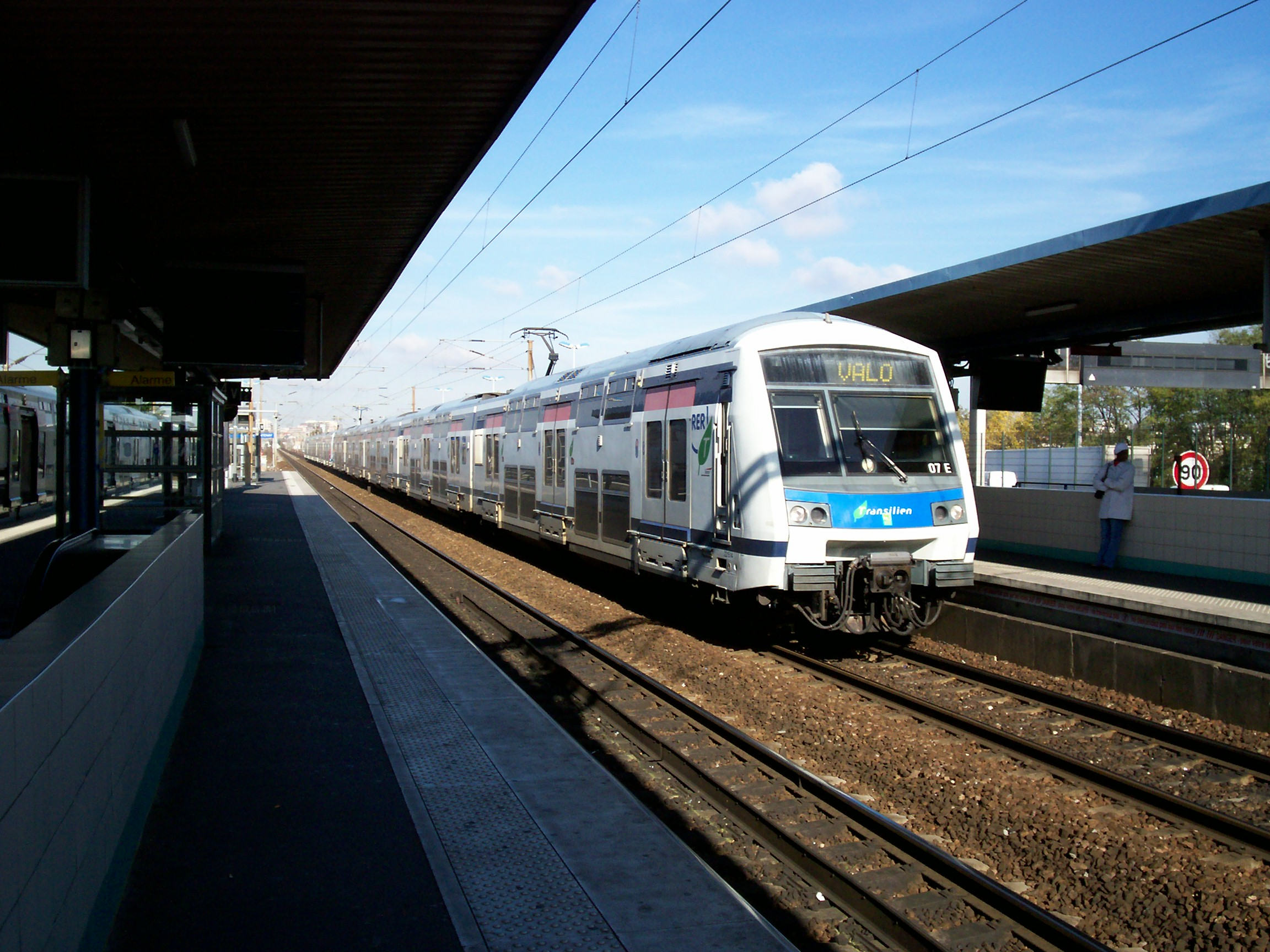
- RER E train entering station en route to Villiers-sur-Marne

General information
- Location: 10 Avenue du Val de Fontenay; Fontenay-sous-Bois; France
- Coordinates: 48°51′16″N 2°29′21″E
- Operator: RER A: RATP; RER E: SNCF
- Line: Paris-Est–Mulhouse-Ville railway
- Platforms: RER A: 2 side platforms; RER E: 2 island platforms
- Tracks: RER A: 2; RER E: 4
- Connections: RATP Bus: 116 118 122 124 301 524; Les Autobus du Fort: 702; Noctilien: N34 N71 N142

Construction
- Platform levels: 2
- Accessible: RER A: Yes, by request to staff; RER E: No

Other information
- Station code: 87113712
- Fare zone: 3

History
- Opened: 8 December 1977

Passengers
- 2024: 19,300,104

Services
Preceding station	RER	Following station
Vincennes towards Cergy-le-Haut	RER A	Neuilly-Plaisance towards Marne-la-Vallée–Chessy
Rosny-sous-Bois towards Nanterre–La Folie	RER E	Nogent–Le Perreux towards Villiers-sur-Marne
Noisy-le-Sec towards Nanterre–La Folie	RER E	Villiers-sur-Marne–Le Plessis-Trévise towards Tournan
Location

Val de Fontenay (French pronunciation: [val də fɔ̃tnɛ]; lit. 'Vale of Fontenay') is a Réseau Express Régional (RER) station in the Paris suburb of Fontenay-sous-Bois. It is on the Paris-Est–Mulhouse-Ville railway and provides an interchange between the RER lines A and E.

== The station ==
The station is named for a neighborhood of Fontenay-sous-Bois. It is served by line A (branch A4) and line E (branch E4).

=== Traffic ===
As of 2019, the estimated annual attendance was 14,295,323 passengers according the RATP Group and 17,693,555 passengers according the SNCF. This attendance makes this station the second busiest station in the Val-de-Marne department.

=== RER A ===
On the RER A, the line towards the east of Paris divides into two branches after Vincennes station. Val de Fontenay is the first station on branch A4 which leads to Marne-la-Vallée–Chessy and is the busier of the two branches. Val de Fontenay (like Noisy-le-Grand-Mont d'Est) is served by every train running on this branch, while others are skipped at certain times of day (such as Bry-sur-Marne and Lognes). The station was opened by RATP on 8 December 1977, the opening date of RER A.

=== RER E ===
The SNCF opened its station the day after the opening of RER A. It lies on the railway line from Paris-Est to Mulhouse-Ville, and was initially served by suburban trains between Paris-Est and Nogent - Le Perreux. Since 30 August 1999, the station is instead served by the RER E on its branch E4, going between Haussmann–Saint-Lazare and Tournan. Train service on the E line consists of 6 trains per hour during the week in both directions. Towards Tournan, there are 4 trains per hour to Villiers-sur-Marne–Le Plessis-Trévise and 2 trains per hour to Tournan. Towards Haussmann–Saint-Lazare, trains coming from Villiers-sur-Marne stop at all stations, while trains coming from Tournan stop only at Noisy-le-Sec, Pantin, Rosa Parks and Magenta. In the evening, there are 4 trains per hour, alternating between Villiers-sur-Marne and Tournan and stopping at all stations.

== Bus connections ==
The station is served by several buses:

- RATP Bus: 116 , 118 , 122 , 124 , 301 , 524
- Les Autobus du Fort: 702
- Noctilien: N34, N71, N142

== Gallery ==
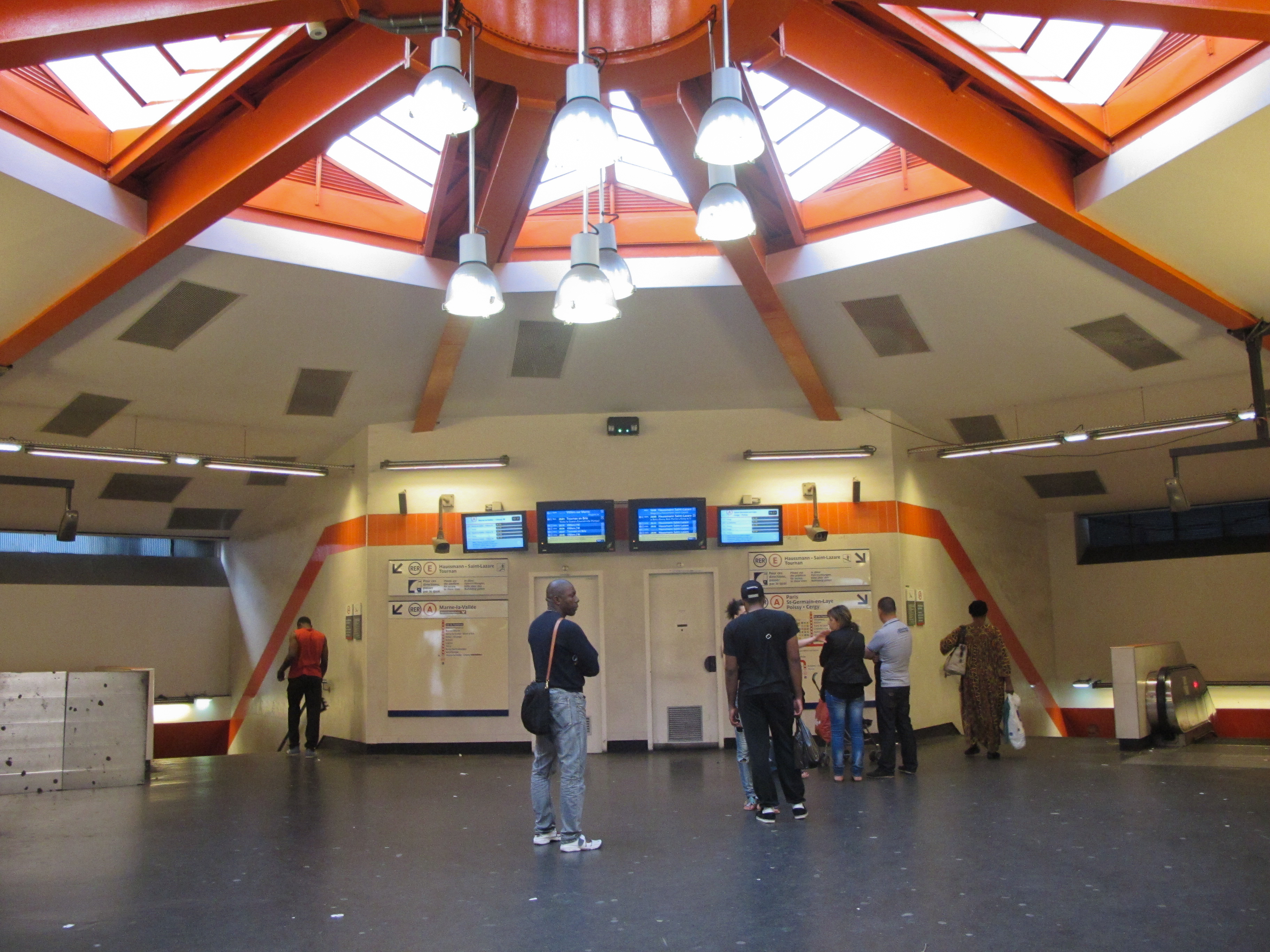
Station concourse
(with view on access to RER A platforms).

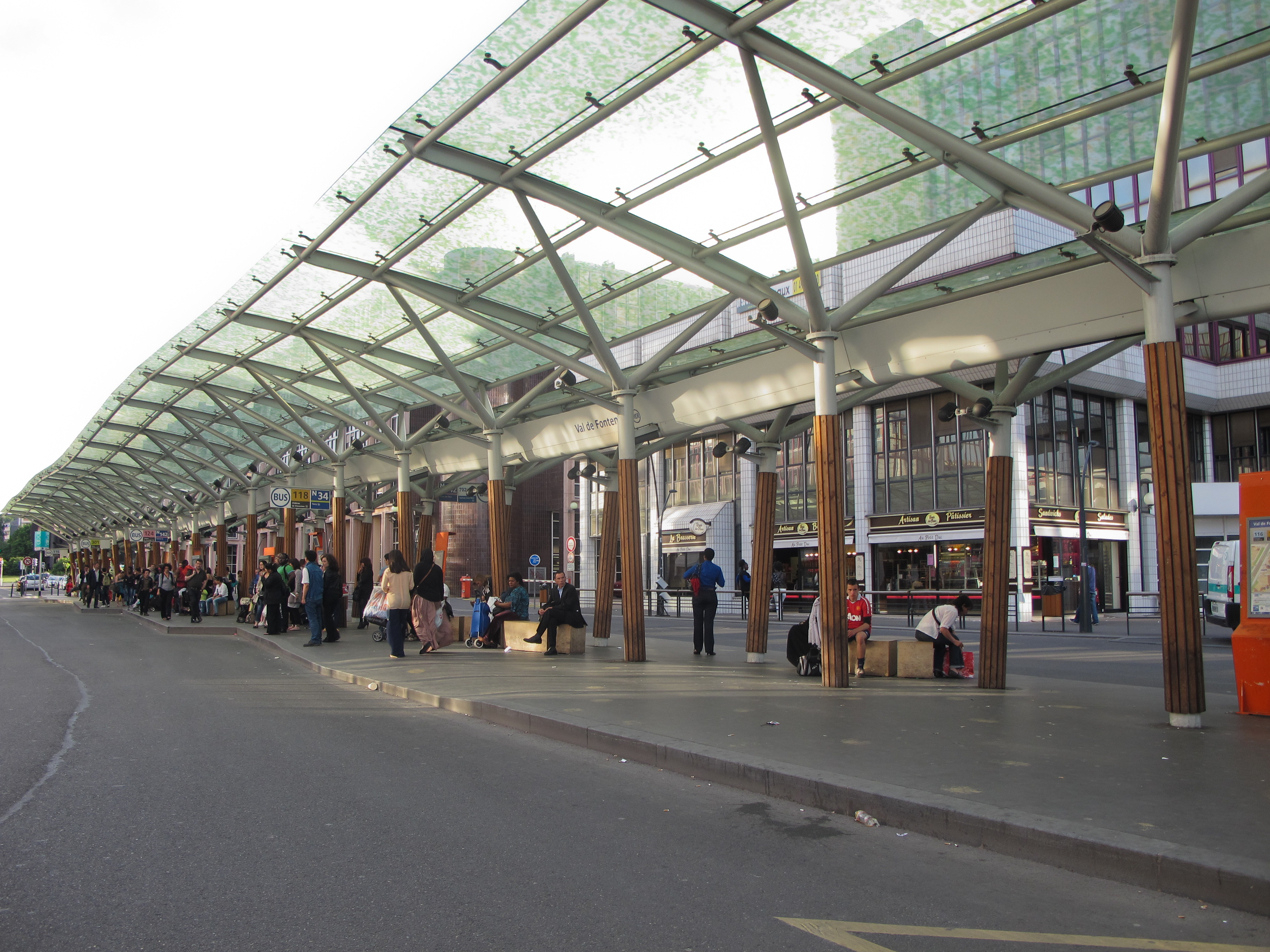
Bus interchange station
(View from the main access)

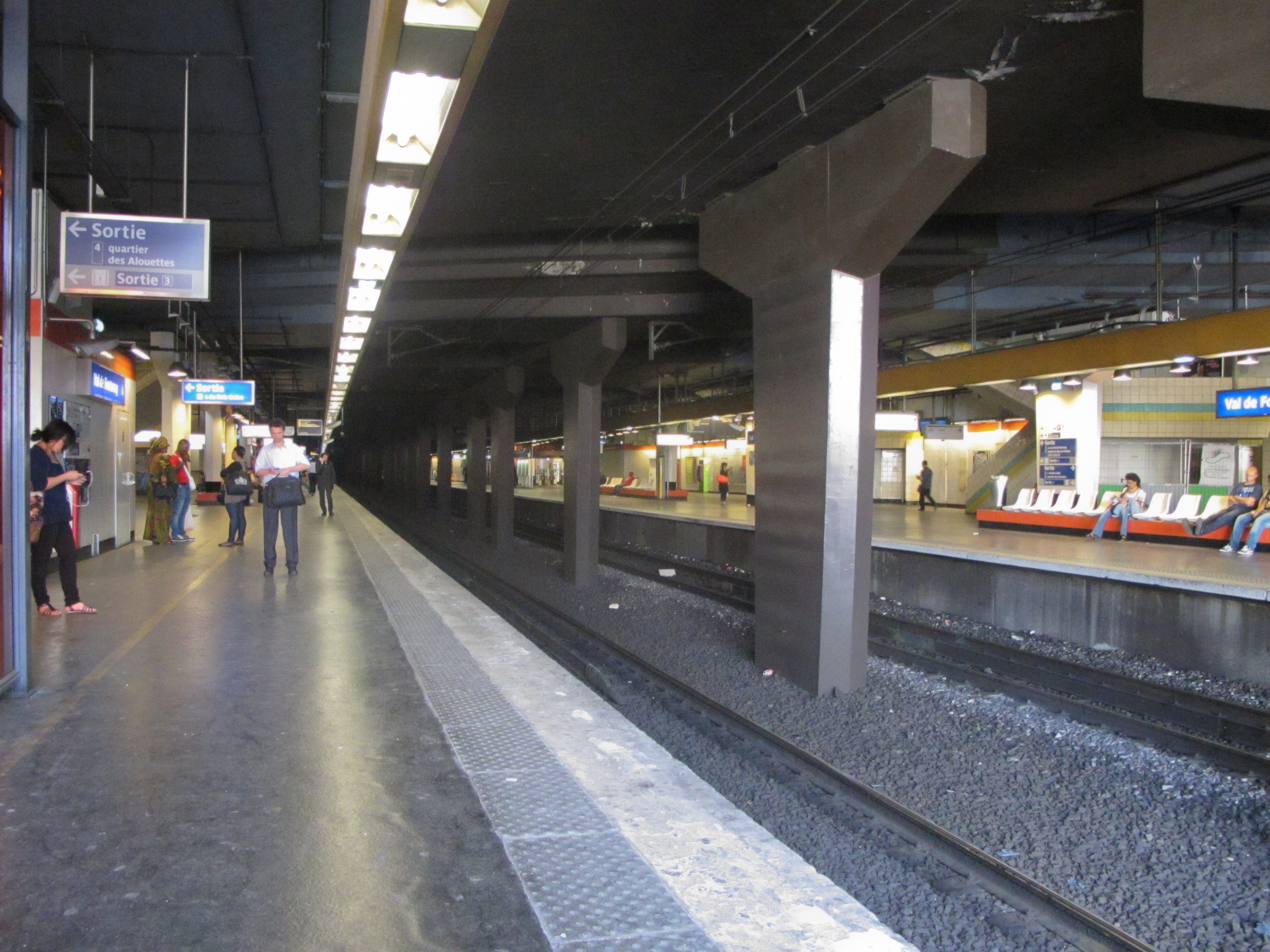
RER A platform – East end (towards Paris)

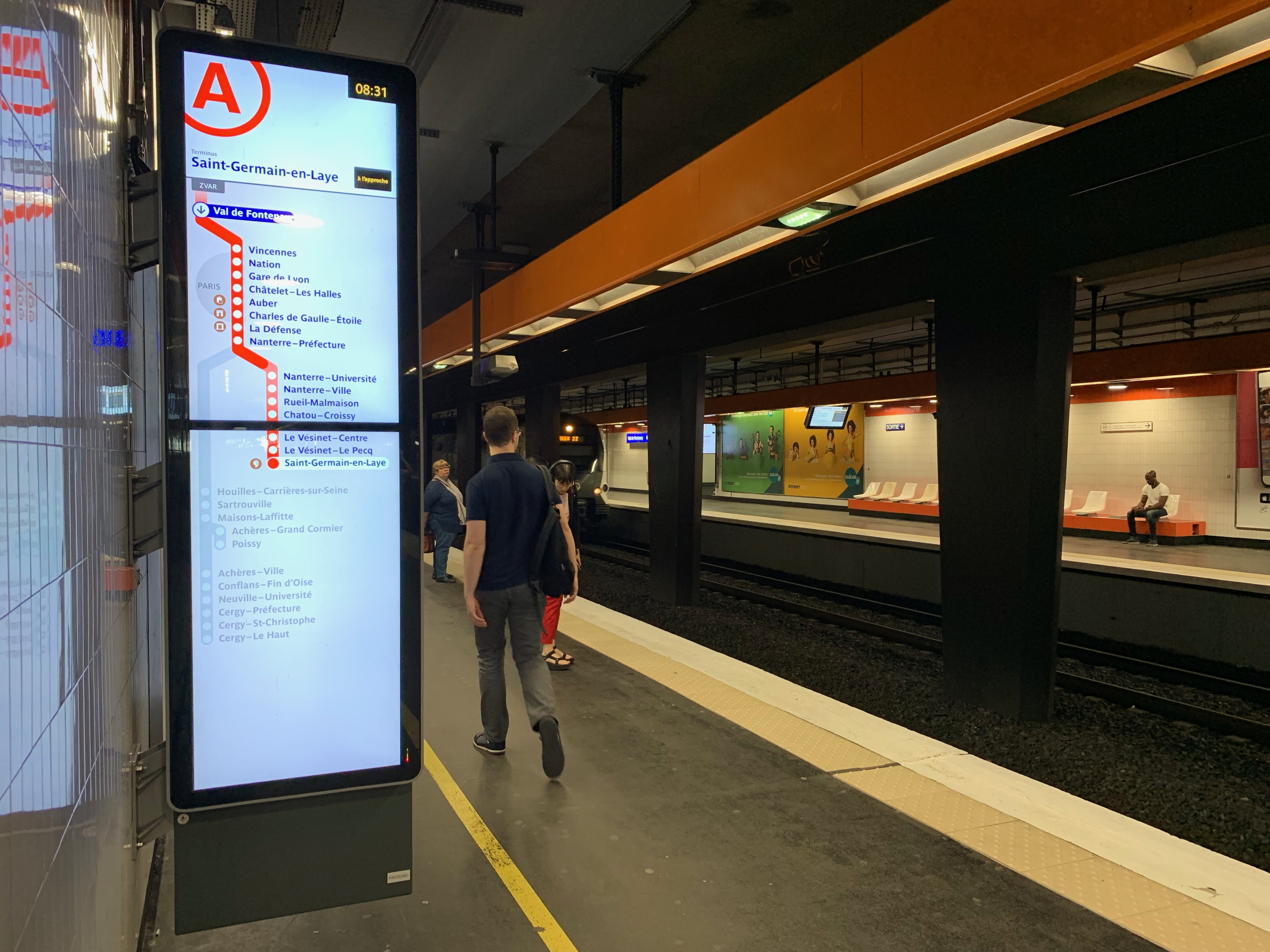
RER A platform (towards Paris)
(with view of a service indicator sign)

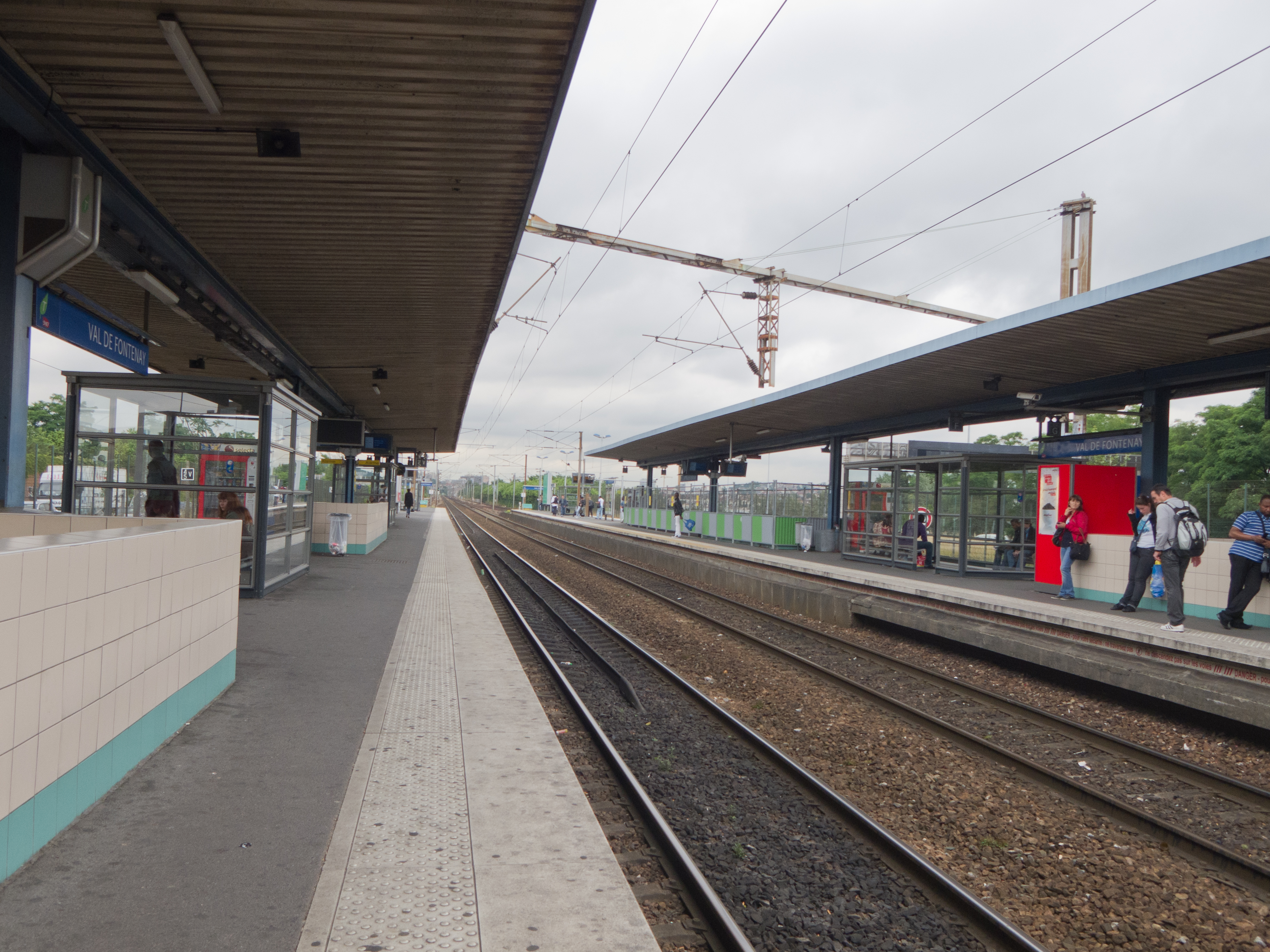
RER E platform (towards Paris)
(View to the North)

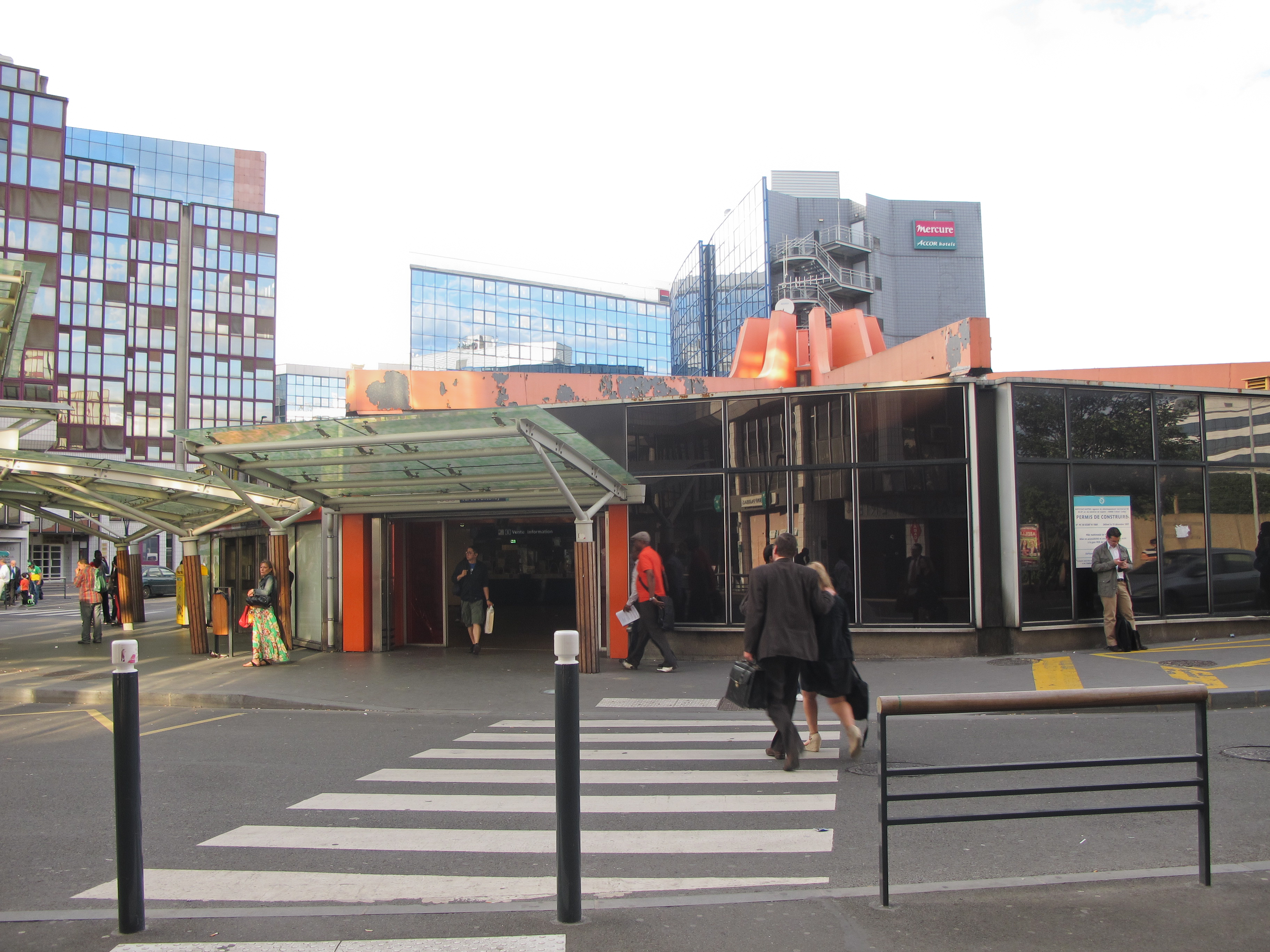
Main access to the bus interchange station

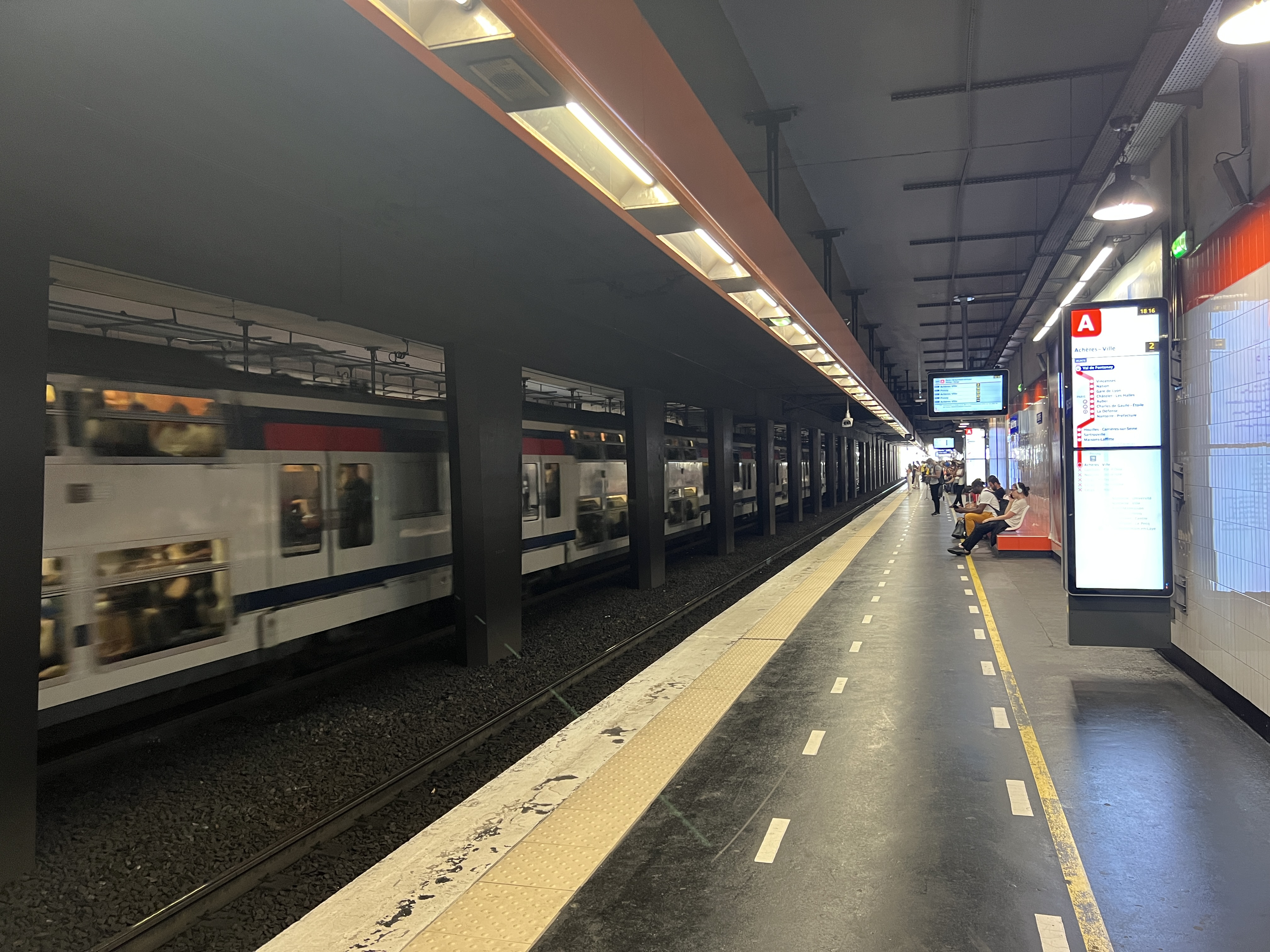
RER A platforms in July 2022

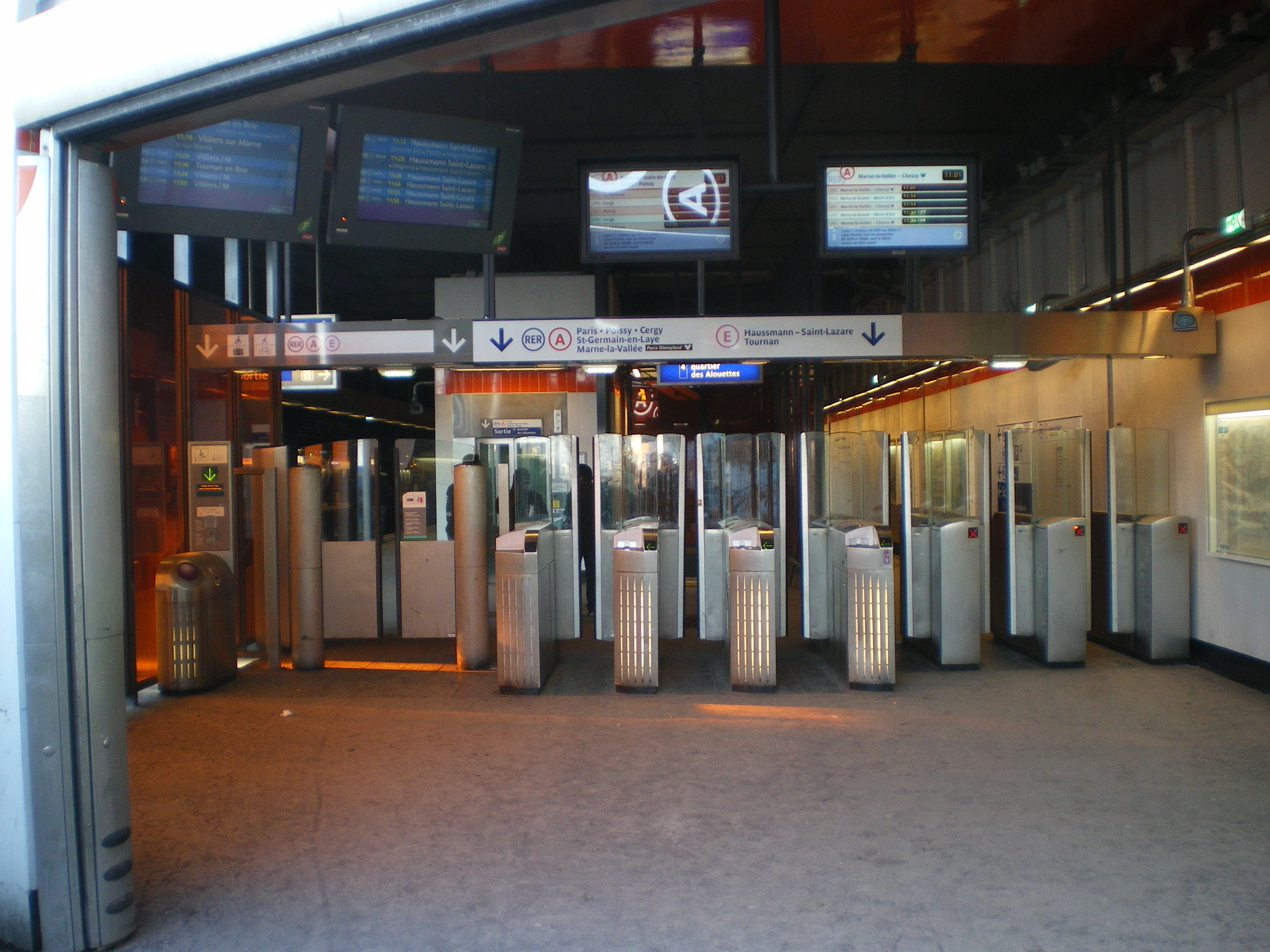
Access ZA Péripôle – Bois Galon

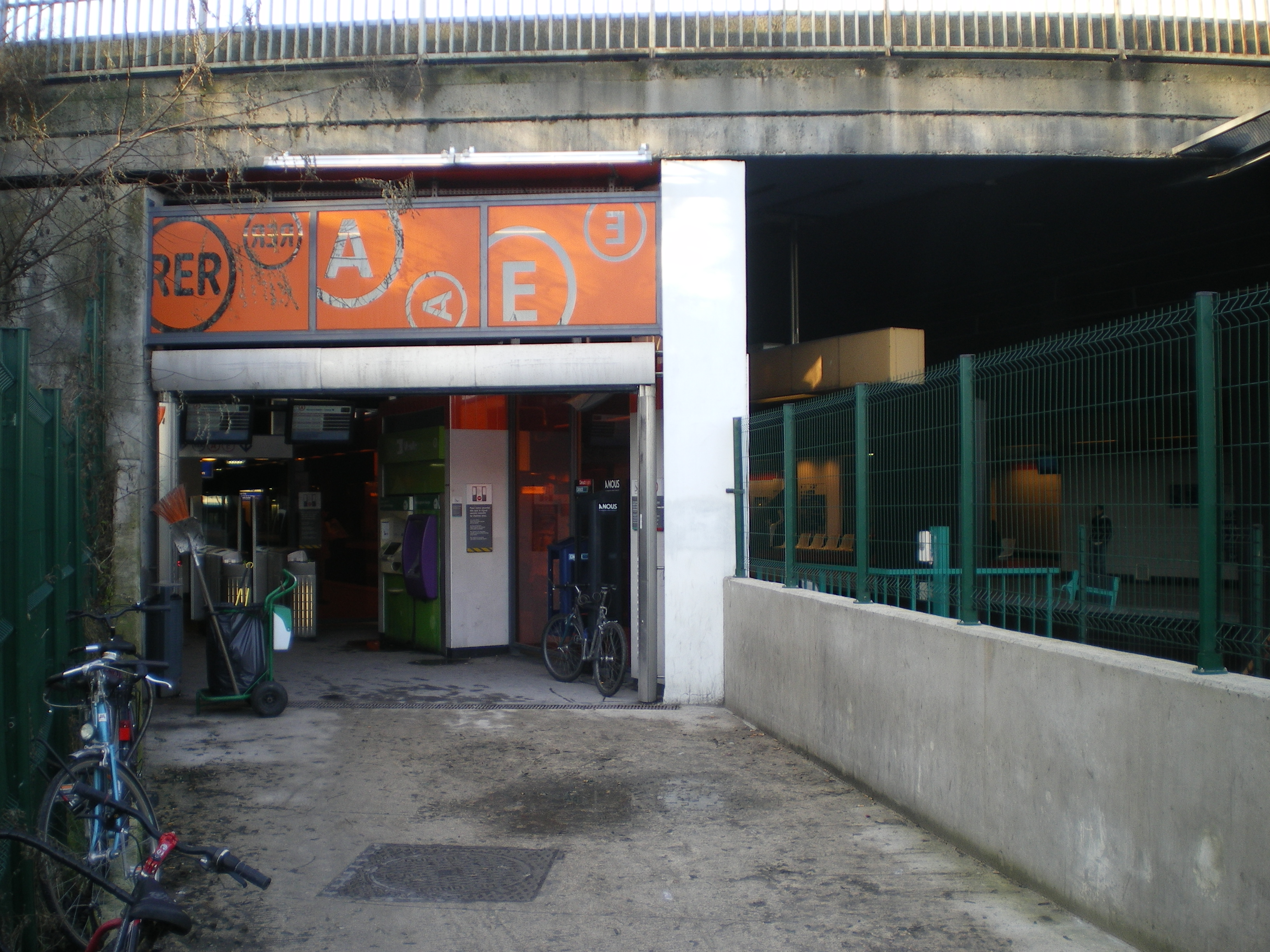
Access Quartier des Alouettes
