= Nogent–Le Perreux station =

Railway station in France

Nogent–Le Perreux
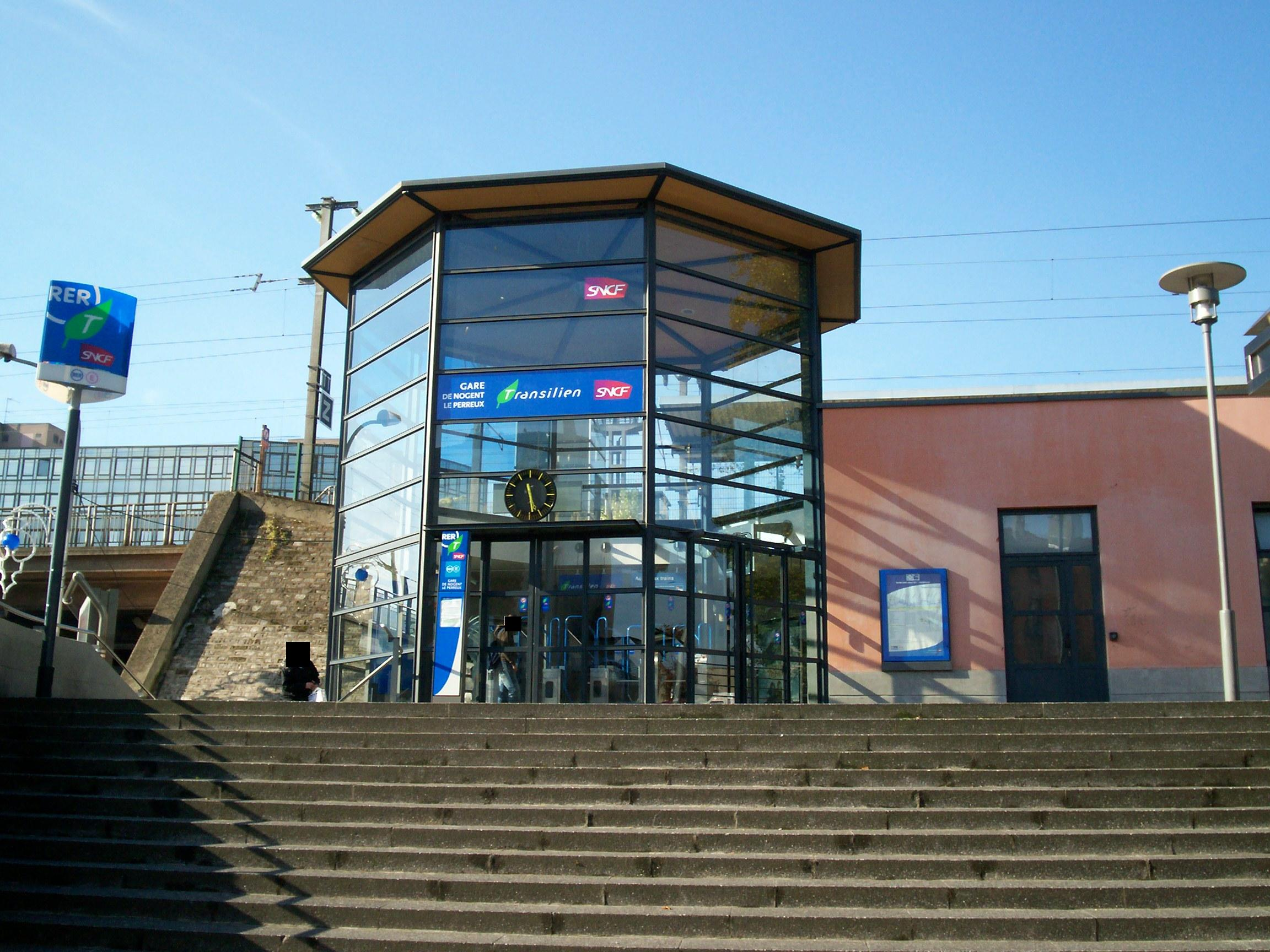
- Station entrance

General information
- Location: Place du Théâtre; Nogent-sur-Marne; France
- Coordinates: 48.83858°N 2.49426°E
- Owner: SNCF
- Operator: SNCF
- Line: Paris-Est–Mulhouse-Ville railway
- Platforms: 3
- Tracks: 6
- Connections: RATP Bus: 114 116 120 210 317; Noctilien: N35 N71 N142

Construction
- Accessible: Yes, by prior reservation

Other information
- Station code: 87113746
- Fare zone: 3

Passengers
- 2024: 3,542,750

Services
Preceding station	RER	Following station
Val de Fontenay towards Nanterre–La Folie	RER E	Les Boullereaux-Champigny towards Tournan
Location

Nogent–Le Perreux (French pronunciation: [nɔʒɑ̃ lə pɛʁø]) is a French railway station in Nogent-sur-Marne, Val-de-Marne. It is served by RER E.

== Station ==
The station is at kilometric point 16.260 of the Paris-Est–Mulhouse-Ville railway. It opened as an RER station in 1999; it bears the name of Nogent-sur-Marne and Le Perreux-sur-Marne. It is served by RER E trains running on the E4 branch.

== Service ==
The station is served in both directions by one train every 15 minutes off-peak, during peak times and at evening. More than 79 trains to Haussmann–Saint-Lazare and 78 trains to Villiers-sur-Marne–Le Plessis-Trévise and Tournan (at evening) call at the station.

== Connections ==
Several buses stop near the station:

- RATP Group bus lines 114 , 116 , 120 , 210 , and 317 .
- Noctilien night lines N71 and N142.

== Future ==
Nogent–Le Perreux could become, by 2030, a station of Grand Paris Express Métro Line 15, when the section from Rosny–Bois-Perrier to Champigny Centre is put into service.

== See also ==
- List of RER stations
- Paris-Est–Mulhouse-Ville railway
- RER E
