= Les Yvris–Noisy-le-Grand station =

French railway station

Les Yvris–Noisy-le-Grand
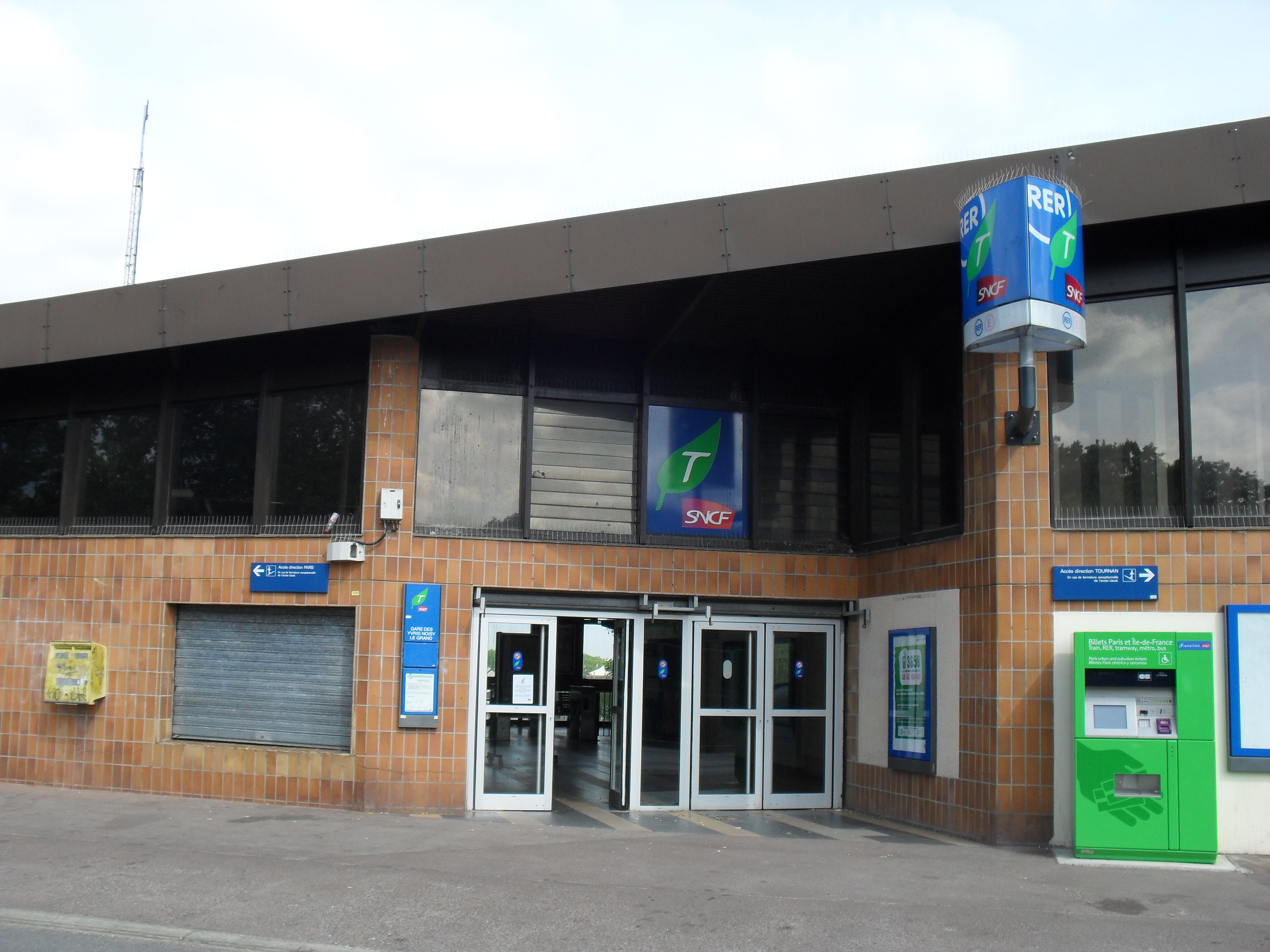
- Station entrance in 2011

General information
- Location: Avenue du Bois Saint-Martin; Noisy-le-Grand; France
- Coordinates: 48.823173°N 2.579743°E
- Owner: SNCF
- Operator: SNCF
- Line: Paris-Est–Mulhouse-Ville railway
- Platforms: 2
- Tracks: 2
- Connections: RATP Bus: 310 312 320

Construction
- Accessible: No

Other information
- Station code: 87113803
- Fare zone: 4

Passengers
- 2015: 831,600

Services
| Preceding station | RER | Following station |
|---|---|---|
| Villiers-sur-Marne–Le Plessis-Trévise towards Nanterre–La Folie | RER E | Émerainville–Pontault-Combault towards Tournan |
Location

Les Yvris–Noisy-le-Grand is a French railway station located at kilometric point 23.843 of the Paris-Est–Mulhouse-Ville railway, on branch E4 of RER E, in Noisy-le-Grand, Seine-Saint-Denis, Île-de-France.

== The station ==
Opened on Paris–Bâle railway, the station is named after a district of Noisy-le-Grand. It has been served since 14 December 2003 by RER E trains bound to Tournan. It was so far served by suburban trains from Paris-Est.

== Service ==
The station is served in both directions by one train every 30 minutes at off-peak times and in the evening, and by 2 to 4 trains an hour during peak hours. More than 45 trains a day serving the station travel towards Haussmann–Saint Lazare, while 44 travel towards Tournan.

== Connections ==
RATP Group bus lines 310, 312 and 320 serve the station.

== Traffic ==
In 2006, around 1 000 people a day entered the station. It is less busy than Noisy-le-Grand–Mont d'Est and Noisy–Champs, served by RER A.
