= Villiers-sur-Marne–Le Plessis-Trévise station =

Railway station in Villiers-sur-Marne, France

Villiers sur Marne Le Plessis Trévise
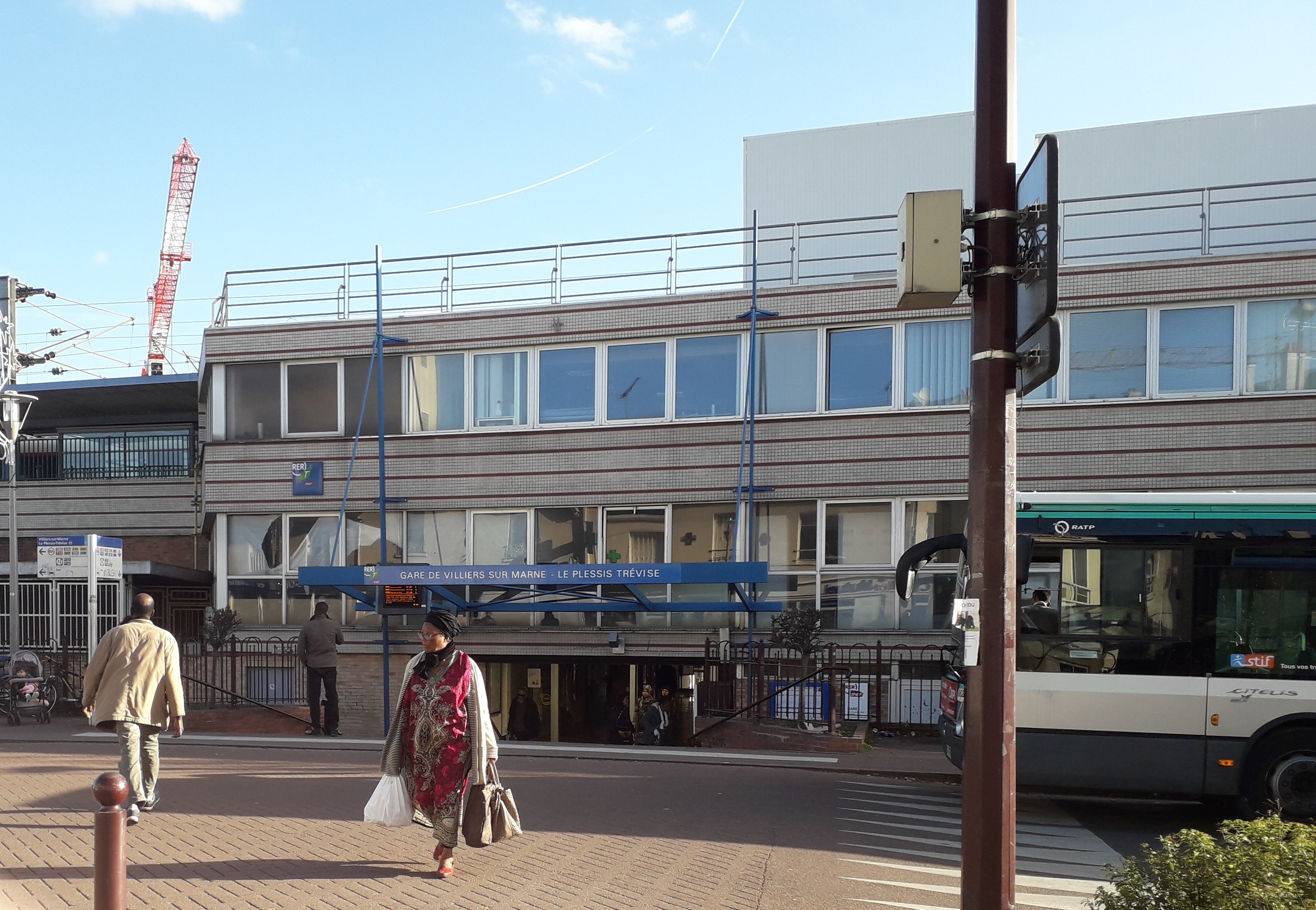
- Station entrance

General information
- Other names: Villiers-sur-Marne
- Location: Place Pierre Sémard; Villiers-sur-Marne; France
- Coordinates: 48°49′24″N 2°32′33″E:
- Elevation: 79 m
- Owner: SNCF
- Operator: SNCF
- Line: Paris-Est–Mulhouse-Ville railway
- Platforms: 2
- Tracks: 3
- Connections: RATP Bus: 106 110 206 207 210 306 308; Noctilien: N33 N130

Construction
- Structure type: Elevated
- Accessible: Yes, by prior reservation

Other information
- Station code: 87113795
- Fare zone: 4

History
- Opened: 1857
- Rebuilt: 1999

Passengers
- 2024: 9,034,899

Services
Preceding station	RER	Following station
Les Boullereaux-Champigny towards Nanterre–La Folie	RER E	Les Yvris–Noisy-le-Grand towards Tournan
Future services
Preceding station	RER	Following station
Villiers–Champigny–Bry towards Nanterre–La Folie	RER E (late 2025)	Les Yvris–Noisy-le-Grand towards Tournan
Location

Villiers-sur-Marne–Le Plessis-Trévise, more commonly known as Villiers-sur-Marne, is a French railway station in Villiers-sur-Marne, Val-de-Marne department. The station is at kilometric point 20.741 of the Paris-Est–Mulhouse-Ville railway; it is nearby the town of Le Plessis-Trévise hence its name. It is served by RER E.

== The station ==
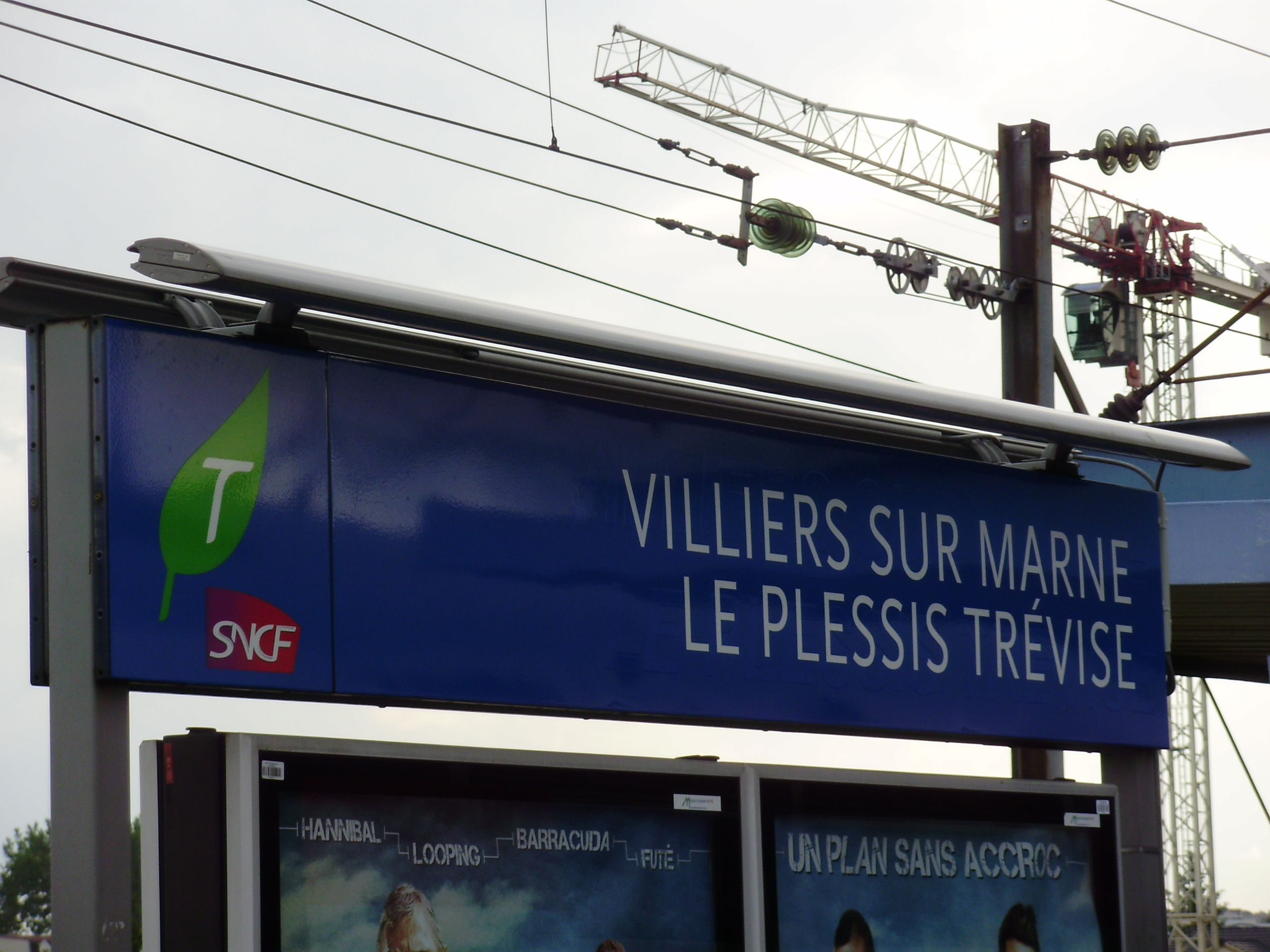
Station signpost

Opened on the Paris-Est–Mulhouse-Ville railway in 1857, the station is served since 30 August 1999 by trains of the RER E line going through the E4 branch. It was previously served by suburban trains from the Gare de l'Est since 1857.

Initially one of the general terminus of the RER E line, the station became a partial terminus (for 4 trains out of 6 at off-peak times and 1 train out of 2 at peak hours) with the extension of this line to Tournan on 14 December 2003.

As of 2019, the estimated annual attendance by the SNCF was 8,146,119 passengers. This attendance makes this station the fifth busiest station in the Val-de-Marne department.

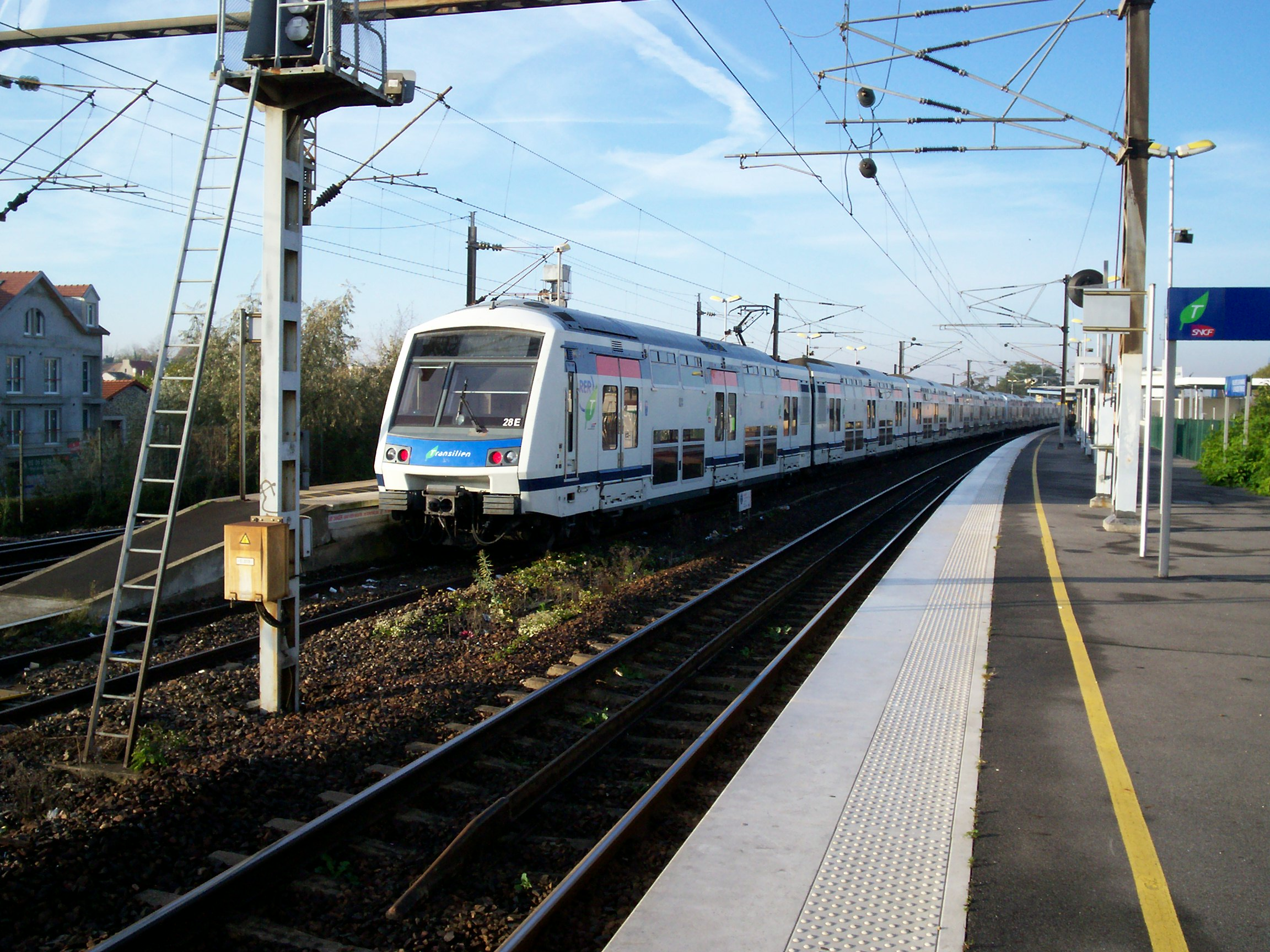
Two-level train (Z 22500) on standby for departure to Haussmann–Saint-Lazare.

== Service ==
There are some 120 trains per working day in each direction between Haussmann–Saint-Lazare and Villiers-sur-Marne station. The first train of the service leaves for Paris at 5:04 a.m. and the last train of the service arrives from Paris at 1:25 a.m. These schedules are valid every day of the year.

The station is served in both directions by: 4 omnibus trains per hour (these make their terminus or departure) & 2 semi-direct trains per hour at off-peak times; 4 omnibus trains per hour (these make their terminus or departure) & 4 semi-direct trains per hour during peak times; 2 omnibus trains per hour (these make their terminus or departure) & 2 omnibus trains between Paris and Tournan in the evening.

== Connections ==
Several buses stop near the station:

- RATP Group bus lines 106 , 110 , 206 , 207 , 210 , 306 and 308 .
- Noctilien night lines N33, N35 and N130.

== See also ==
- List of stations of the Paris RER
- Paris-Est–Mulhouse-Ville railway
- RER E
