= Haussmann–Saint-Lazare station =

Railway station in Paris, France

Haussmann–Saint-Lazare
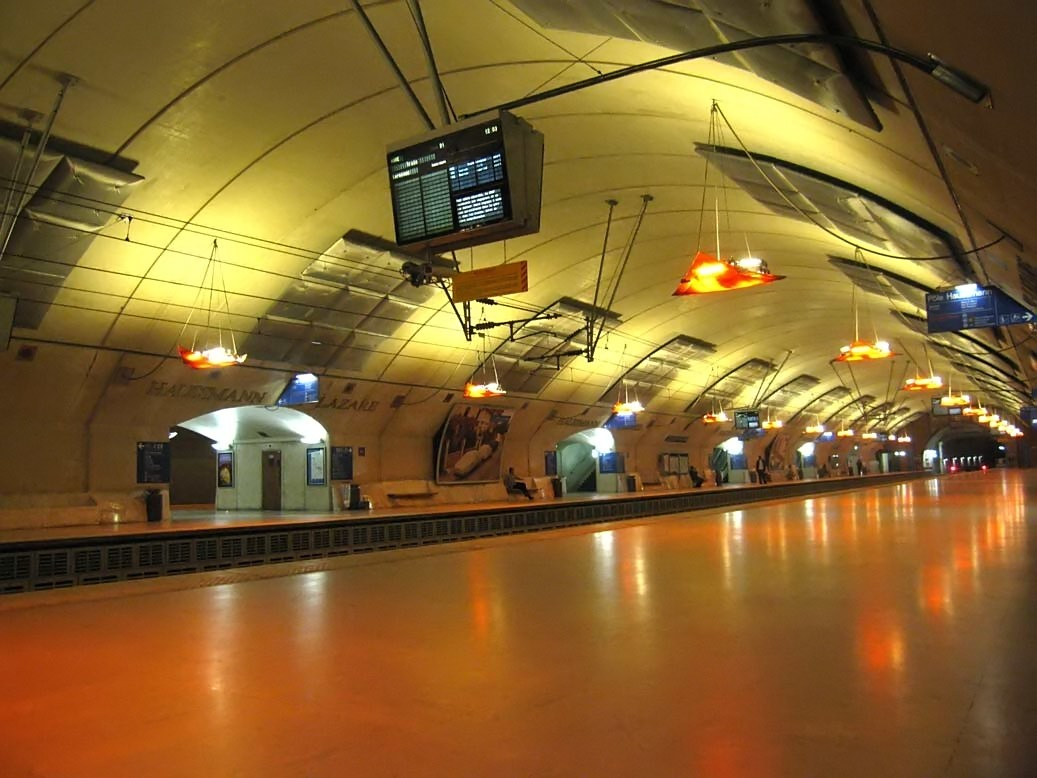
- Platforms in June 2006

General information
- Location: 9th arrondissement of Paris; Île-de-France; France
- Coordinates: 48°52′30″N 2°19′44″E
- Operator: SNCF
- Platforms: 2
- Tracks: 4
- Bus routes: 20 21 22 24 26 27 28 29 32 43 53 66 80 81 94 95; N01 N02 N15 N16 N51 N52 N53 N150 N151 N152 N153 N154
- Connections: at Auber; at Havre–Caumartin; at Opéra; at Saint-Augustin; Normandie at Gare Saint-Lazare; at Saint-Lazare

Construction
- Structure type: Underground
- Accessible: Yes, by prior reservation

Other information
- Station code: 87281899
- Fare zone: 1

History
- Opened: 14 July 1999; 27 years ago

Passengers
- 2024: 38,268,052

Services
Preceding station	RER	Following station
Neuilly–Porte Maillot towards Nanterre–La Folie	RER E	Magenta towards Chelles–Gournay or Tournan
Connections to other stations
Preceding station	RER	Following station
Charles de Gaulle–Étoile towards Saint-Germain-en-Laye, Cergy-le-Haut or Poissy	RER A transfer at Auber	Châtelet–Les Halles towards Boissy-Saint-Léger or Marne-la-Vallée–Chessy
Preceding station	Paris Metro	Following station
Europe towards Pont de Levallois–Bécon	Line 3 transfer at Saint-Lazare	Havre–Caumartin towards Gallieni
Saint-Lazare towards Pont de Levallois–Bécon	Line 3 transfer at Havre–Caumartin	Opéra towards Gallieni
Havre–Caumartin towards Pont de Levallois–Bécon	Line 3 transfer at Opéra	Quatre-Septembre towards Gallieni
Pyramides towards Villejuif–Louis Aragon or Mairie d'Ivry	Line 7 transfer at Opéra	Chaussée d'Antin–La Fayette towards La Courneuve–8 mai 1945
Madeleine towards Balard	Line 8 transfer at Opéra	Richelieu–Drouot towards Pointe du Lac
Miromesnil towards Pont de Sèvres	Line 9 transfer at Saint-Augustin	Havre–Caumartin towards Mairie de Montreuil
Saint-Augustin towards Pont de Sèvres	Line 9 transfer at Havre–Caumartin	Chaussée d'Antin–La Fayette towards Mairie de Montreuil
Madeleine towards Mairie d'Issy	Line 12 transfer at Saint-Lazare	Trinité–d'Estienne d'Orves towards Mairie d'Aubervilliers
Miromesnil towards Châtillon–Montrouge	Line 13 transfer at Saint-Lazare	Liège towards Les Courtilles or Saint-Denis–Université
Pont Cardinet towards Saint-Denis–Pleyel	Line 14 transfer at Saint-Lazare	Madeleine towards Aéroport d'Orly
Location

Haussmann–Saint-Lazare (French pronunciation: [osman sɛ̃lazaʁ]) is a railway station of the Réseau Express Régional (RER) on the Rive Droite in Paris, France. Opened on 14 July 1999 as the provisional western terminus of the new Line E, it is situated beneath Boulevard Haussmann and directly connected to the Gare Saint-Lazare, Auber, as well as a number of Metro stations: Saint-Lazare, Havre–Caumartin, Opéra and Saint-Augustin.

== Engineering ==
The architecture of Haussmann–Saint-Lazare closely resembles that of Magenta. Following the earlier model of Charles de Gaulle–Étoile, its main train hall houses two lines under a single cathedral-like vault with lateral platforms. As at Magenta, the hall is supplemented by an additional two "half-stations" on either side, each with one platform.

A "cathedral station", Haussmann–Saint-Lazare is remarkable for its relatively lavish proportions. A long term project to extend the Line E to the west, forming a new cross-Paris axis, was approved in February 2011.

The station's construction cost was €275 million.

== Scale ==
Haussmann–Saint-Lazare forms part of a complex of connected underground stations (see below). Due to the scale of Auber in particular, this ensemble represents a notably large underground public space in terms of volume.

== Train services ==
The station is served by the following service(s):

- Commuter services (RER E) from Nanterre–La Folie to Chelles–Gournay
- Commuter services (RER E) from Nanterre–La Folie to Tournan

== Gallery ==
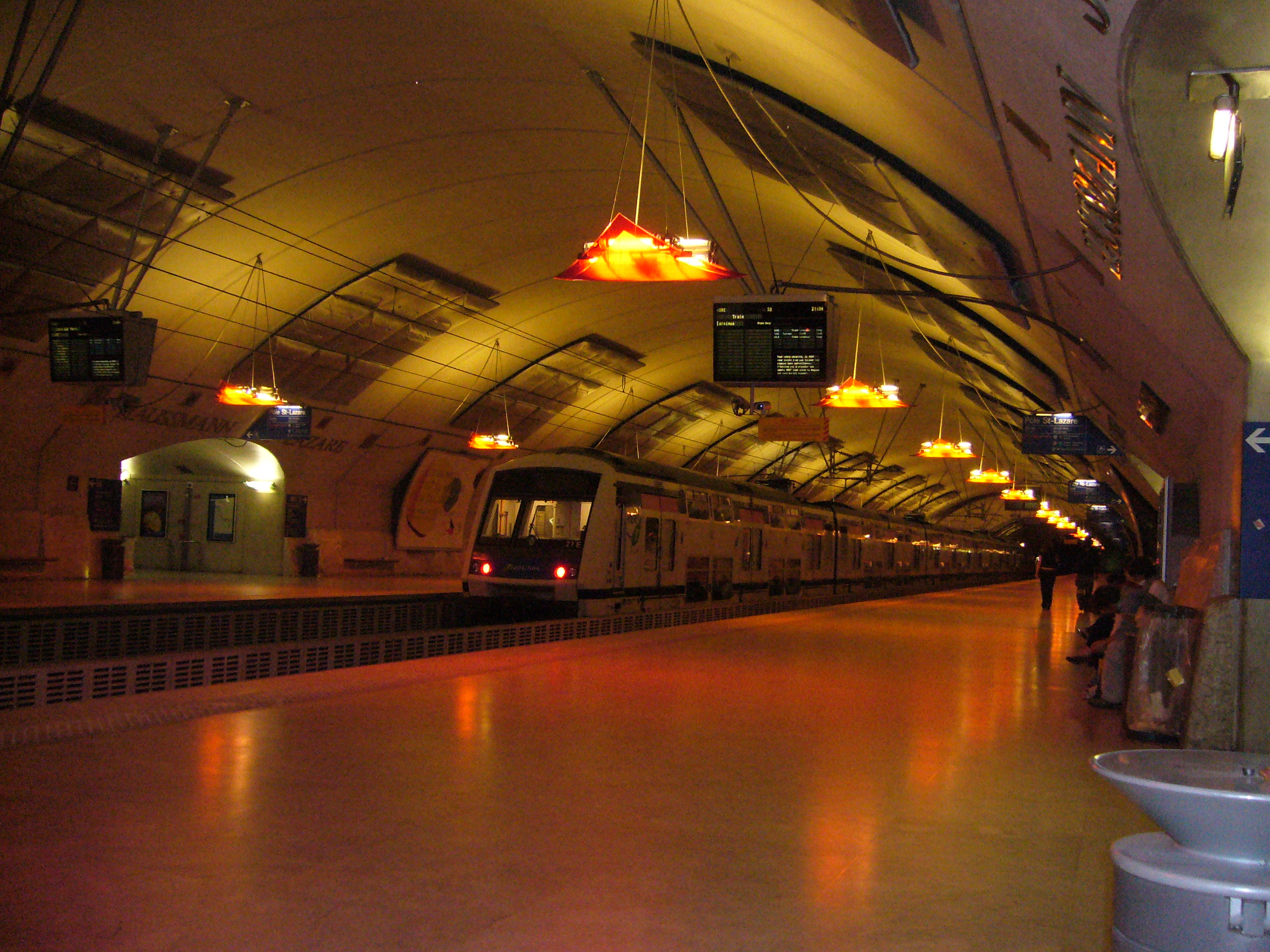
RER E platforms at Haussmann–Saint-Lazare

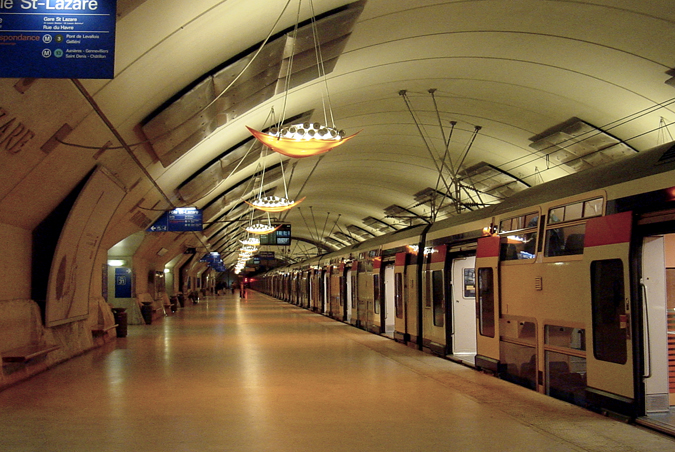
RER E platforms at Haussmann–Saint-Lazare

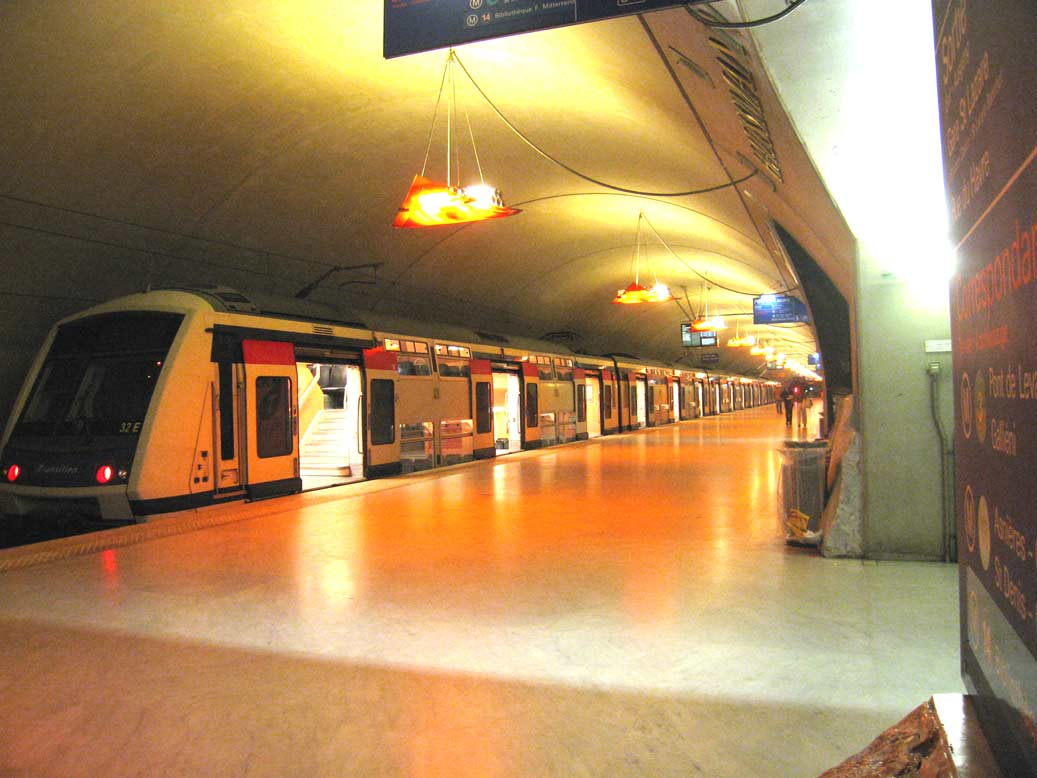
Z 22500 rolling stock at Haussmann–Saint-Lazare

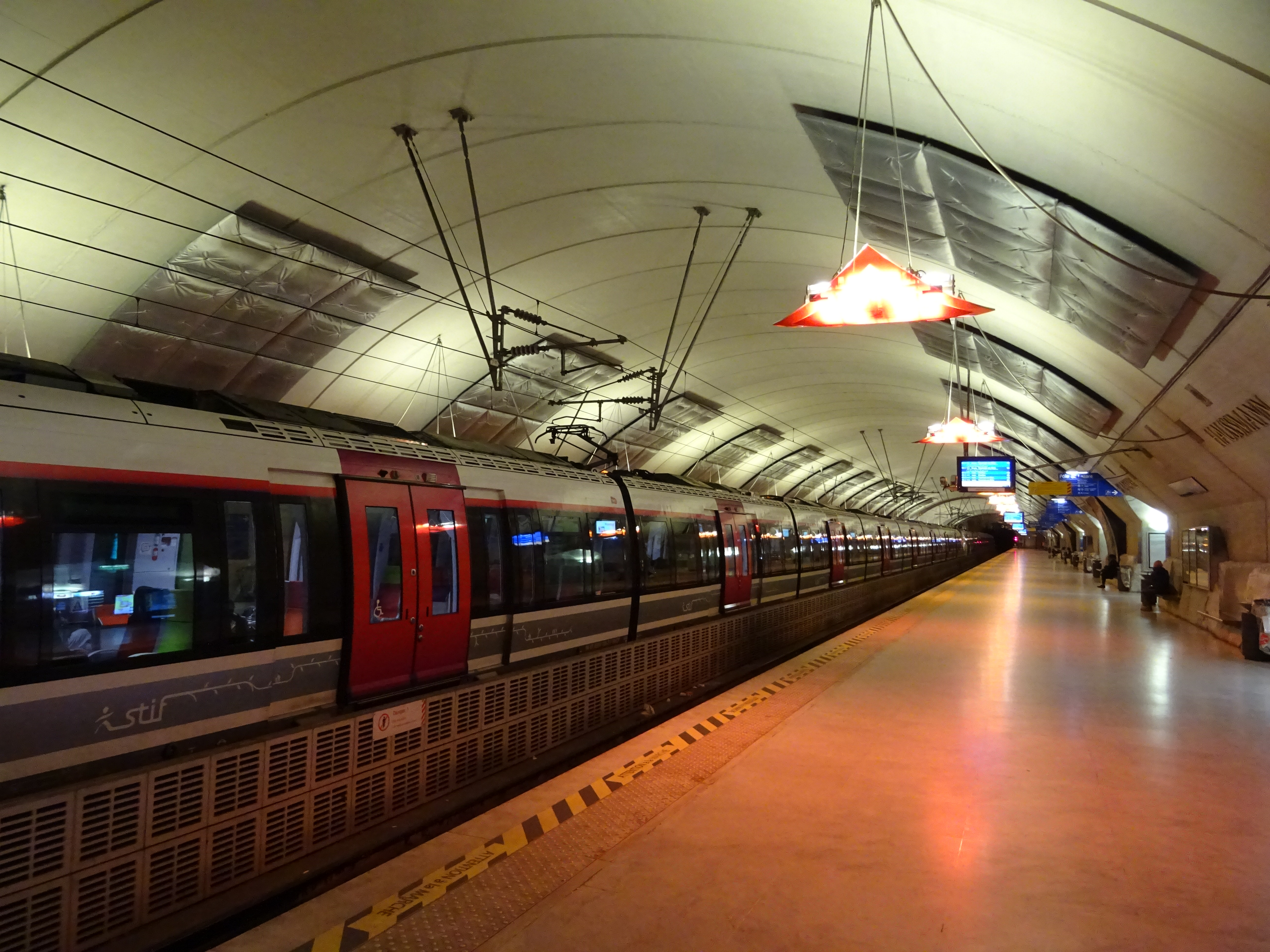
Z 50000 rolling stock at Haussmann–Saint-Lazare

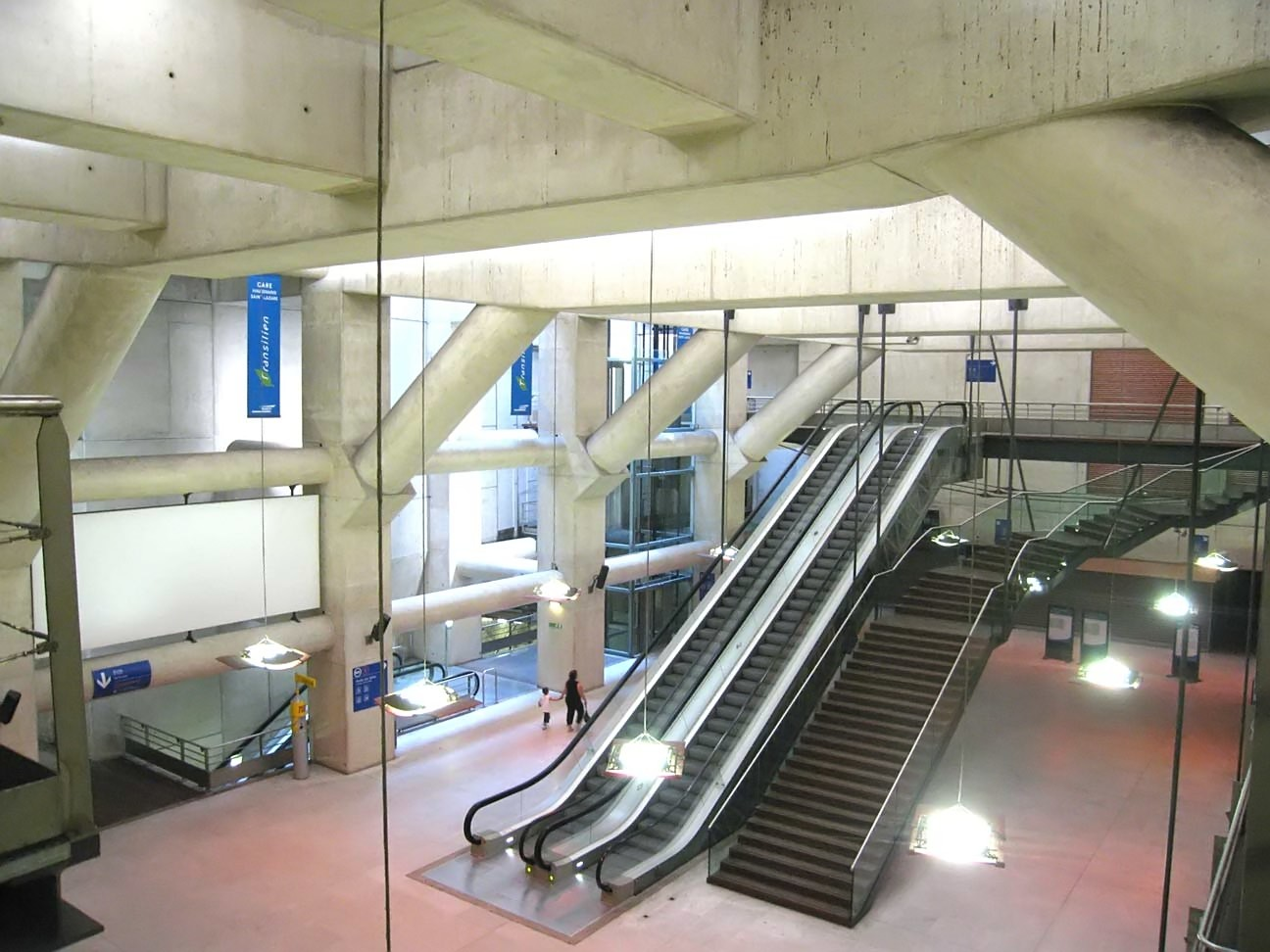
Station interchange

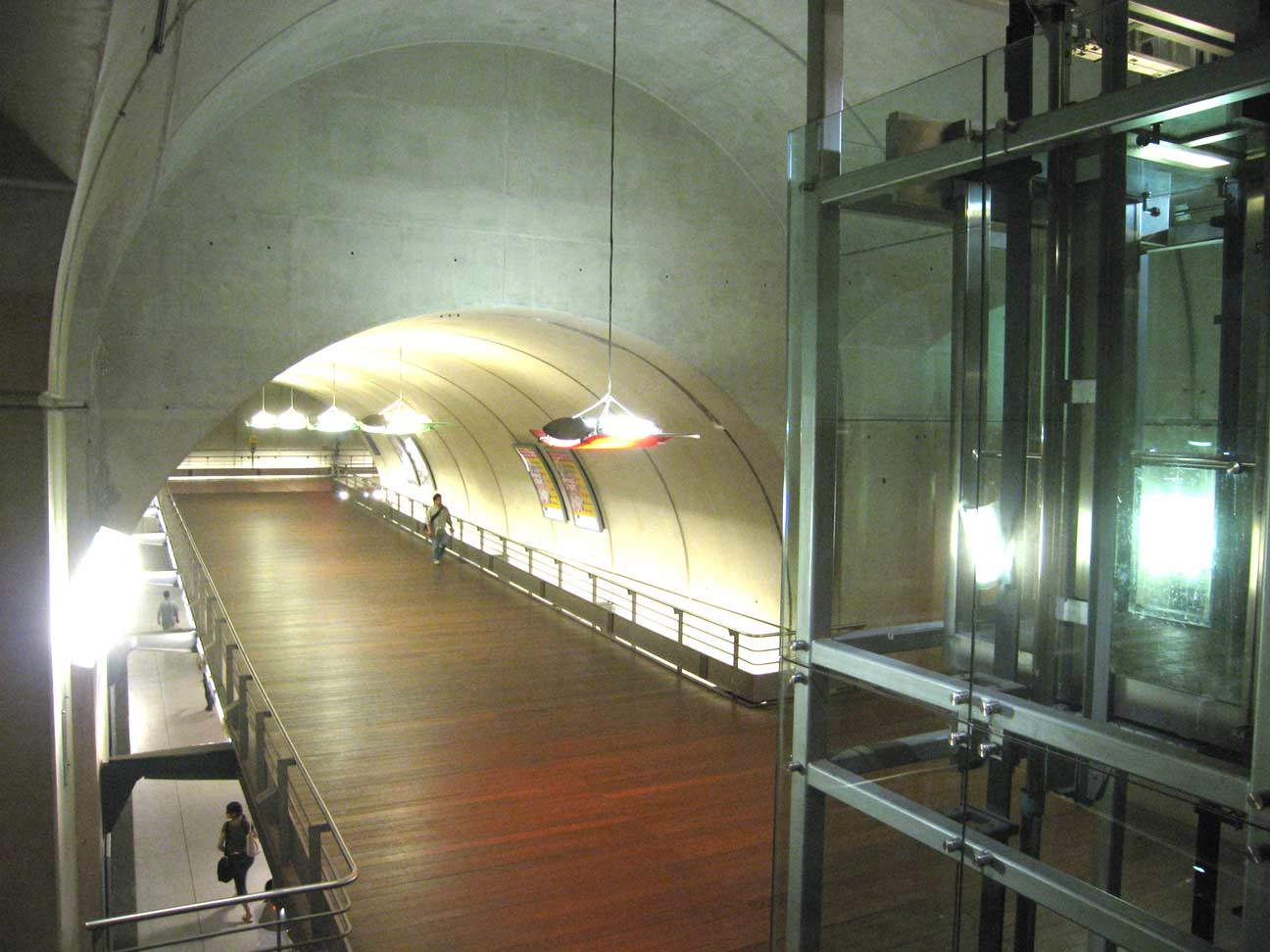
Interconnecting corridor

== See also ==
- List of Réseau Express Régional stations
- List of Paris Metro stations
