= Noctilien =

Bus service in Paris, France

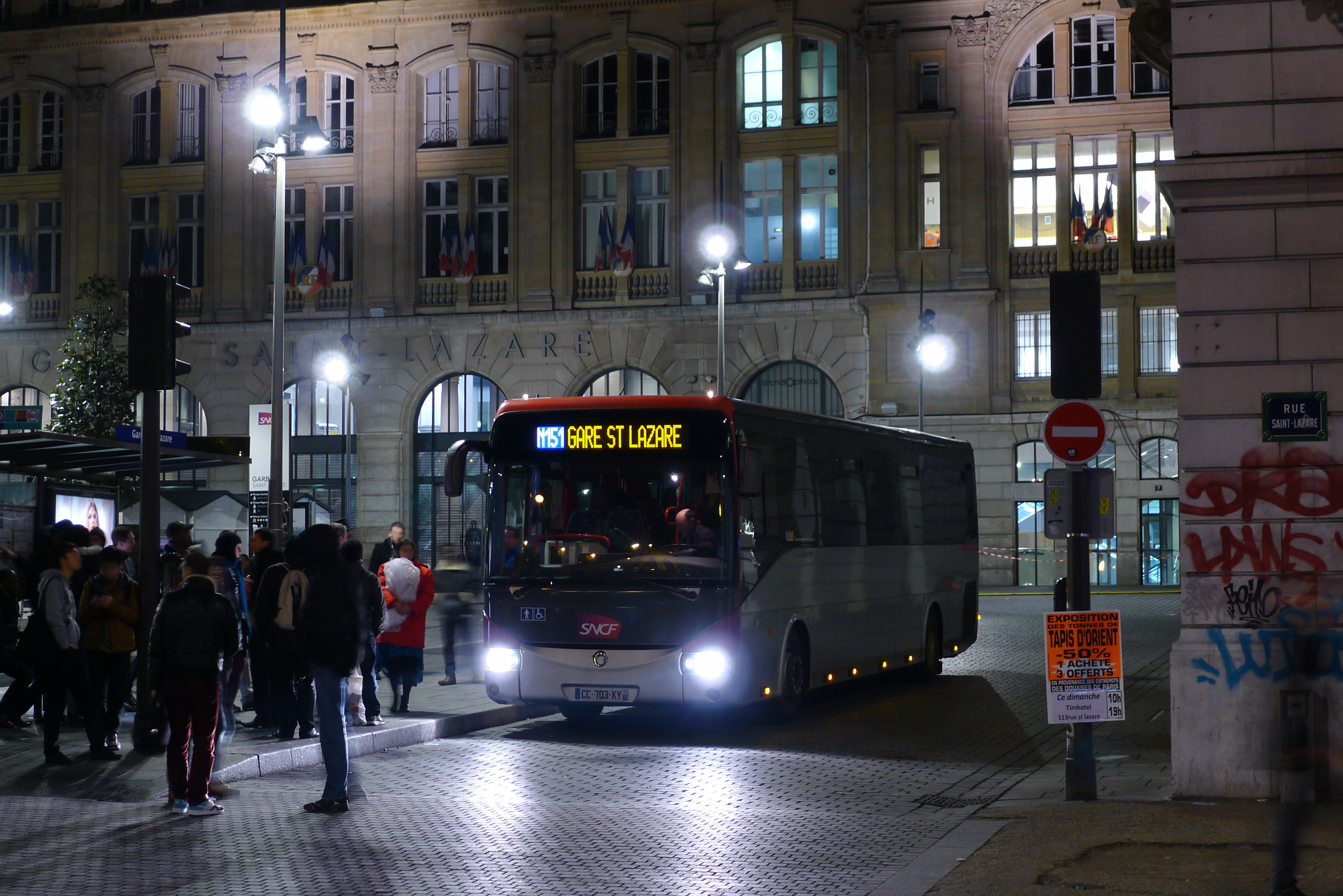
- Noctilien Bus N151 at Paris - Gare Saint-Lazare
- Parent: Île-de-France Mobilités (ex-STIF)
- Commenced operation: September 21, 2005
- Headquarters: Paris
- Service area: Île-de-France Region
- Service type: Bus and Express Bus
- Alliance: Filéo
- Routes: 56
- Stops: 1239
- Destinations: Paris * Near & Remote suburbs * Paris Airports (Orly & CDG)
- Hubs: Châtelet * Gare de Lyon * Gare de l'Est * Gare Saint-Lazare * Gare Montparnasse
- Stations: Métro, RER and Transilien stations
- Depots: RATP & Optile bus centers
- Fleet: City buses and express coaches
- Daily ridership: From 22,000 travelers (weeknight) to 36,000 travelers (weekend night) (2016)
- Annual ridership: 9.82 million travelers (2016)
- Operator: RATP; Keolis; Transdev; RATP Cap; SNCF (Transilien)
- Chief executive: President of Île-de-France Mobilités
- Website: RATP; IDFM; Transilien

Noctilien is the night bus service in Paris and its agglomeration. It is managed by the Île-de-France Mobilités (formerly the STIF), the Île-de-France regional public transit authority, and operated by RATP (with 32 lines) and Transilien SNCF (with 21 lines).

It replaced the previous Noctambus service on the night of 20/21 September 2005, providing for a larger number of lines than before and claiming to be better adapted to night-time transport needs. Like Transilien, the name "Noctilien" is formed by analogy with "Francilien" — the French demonym for residents of Île-de-France.

In place of the previous hub-and-spoke scheme in which all buses terminated at and departed from the heart of Paris at Châtelet, Noctilien's new service includes buses operating between banlieues (the communes surrounding Paris proper) as well as outbound lines running from Paris' four main railway stations: Gare de l'Est, Gare de Lyon, Gare Montparnasse and Gare Saint-Lazare. In addition, these four stations are also connected to each other by a regular night bus service.

Noctilien operates 53 bus lines over the whole of Paris and the Île-de-France region from around 12:30 a.m. when the rail network and the regular daytime bus service ends, until around 05:30 the next morning when they resume service.

== Numbering scheme ==
Each bus line number starts with N for Noctilien, followed by a two or three digit number:

- N0x (N01 and N02): Circular lines running between Paris' major train stations.
- N1x (N11 to N16): Transversal lines running between different suburbs of Paris via its center at Châtelet.
- Radial lines from major stations to near suburbs:
  - N2x: Radial lines from Châtelet.
  - N3x: Radial lines from Gare de Lyon.
  - N4x: Radial lines from Gare de l'Est.
  - N5x: Radial lines from Gare Saint-Lazare.
  - N6x: Radial lines from Gare Montparnasse.
- N1xx: for radial long-distance lines running to the outer suburbs.
  - N122 & N153 are managed by RATP.
  - The other 3 digits lines (except N135) are managed by Transilien SNCF;
- Ring lines in the suburbs:
  - N71, managed by RATP.
  - N135, managed by Transilien SNCF.

== Lines ==
The time intervals indicated here concern weekdays. The service is reinforced on Friday and Saturday nights and on days that precede bank holidays.

- N01 - Inner (clockwise) circle line from and to Gare de l'Est
  via Gare de Lyon → Gare Montparnasse → Gare Saint-Lazare. Every 14 minutes.
- N02 - Outer (counterclockwise) circle line from and to Gare Montparnasse
  via Gare de Lyon → Gare de l'Est → Gare Saint-Lazare. Every 14 minutes.
- N11 - Pont de Neuilly ↔ Château de Vincennes. Every 30 minutes.
- N12 - Pont de Sèvres ↔ Romainville - Carnot. Every 35 minutes.
- N13 - Mairie d'Issy ↔ Bobigny - Pablo Picasso. Every 20 minutes.
- N14 - Mairie de Saint-Ouen ↔ La Croix de Berny. Every 30 minutes.
- N15 - Asnières − Gennevilliers - Gabriel Péri ↔ Villejuif - Louis Aragon. Every 30 minutes.
- N16 - Pont de Levallois ↔ Mairie de Montreuil. Every 22 minutes.
- N21 - Châtelet ↔ Longjumeau - Hôpital. Every 30 minutes.
- N22 - Châtelet ↔ Juvisy. Every 20 minutes.
- N23 - Châtelet ↔ Chelles-Gournay. Every 30 minutes.
- N24 - Châtelet ↔ Sartrouville. Every 30 minutes.
- N31 - Gare de Lyon ↔ Paris Orly Airport (South Terminal). Every 30 minutes.
- N32 - Gare de Lyon ↔ Boissy-Saint-Léger. Every 30 minutes.
- N33 - Gare de Lyon ↔ Villiers-sur-Marne (via Vincennes & Nogent-sur-Marne). Every 30 minutes.
- N34 - Gare de Lyon ↔ Torcy. Every 30 minutes.
- N35 - Gare de Lyon ↔ Villiers-sur-Marne (via Maisons-Alfort & Saint-Maur-des-Fossés). Every 30 minutes.
- N41 - Gare de l'Est ↔ Villeparisis – Mitry-le-Neuf. Every 30 minutes.
- N42 - Gare de l'Est ↔ Aulnay-sous-Bois - Garonor . Every 20 minutes.
- N43 - Gare de l'Est ↔ Gare de Sarcelles-Saint-Brice. Every 20 minutes.
- N44 - Gare de l'Est ↔ Garges-Sarcelles. Every 20 minutes.
- N45 - Gare de l'Est ↔ Montfermeil - Hôpital. Every 30 minutes.
- N51 - Gare Saint-Lazare ↔ Gare d'Enghien. Every 30 minutes.
- N52 - Gare Saint-Lazare ↔ Gare de Cormeilles-en-Parisis. Every 30 minutes.
- N53 - Gare Saint-Lazare ↔ Nanterre - Anatole France. Every 30 minutes.
- N61 - Gare Montparnasse ↔ Clamart - Georges Pompidou. Every 30 minutes.
- N62 - Gare Montparnasse ↔ Rungis International Market. Every 35 minutes.
- N63 - Gare Montparnasse ↔ École Polytechnique - Vauve. Every 30 minutes.
- N66 - Gare Montparnasse ↔ Gare de Chaville-Rive-Droite. Every 30 minutes.
- N71 - Rungis International Market ↔ Val de Fontenay. Every 26 minutes.
- N122 - Châtelet ↔ Saint-Rémy-lès-Chevreuse. Every 60 minutes.
- N123 - Châtelet ↔ Gare d'Arpajon. Every 60 minutes.
- N130 - Gare de Lyon ↔ Marne-la-Vallée - Chessy (Disneyland Paris). Every 60–80 minutes.
- N131 - Gare de Lyon ↔ Brétigny. Every 60 minutes.
- N132 - Gare de Lyon ↔ Melun. Every 60 minutes.
- N133 - Gare de Lyon ↔ Juvisy. Every 60 minutes.
- N134 - Gare de Lyon ↔ Combs-la-Ville-Quincy. Every 60 minutes.
- N135 - Boissy-Saint-Léger ↔ Corbeil-Essonnes. Every 60–65 minutes.
- N137 - Gare de Lyon ↔ Fontainebleau-Avon (Montereau-Fault-Yonne On week-ends). Only 2 departures for direction.
- N139 - Gare de Lyon ↔ Corbeil-Essonnes. Every 30 minutes.
- N140 - Gare de l'Est ↔ Paris Charles de Gaulle (CDG) Airport (All Terminals). Every 60 minutes.
- N141 - Gare de l'Est ↔ Gare de Meaux. Every 60 minutes.
- N142 - Gare de l'Est ↔ Tournan. Every 60 minutes.
- N143 - Gare de l'Est ↔ Paris Charles de Gaulle (CDG) Airport (Semi-direct link to all Terminals). Every 30 minutes.
- N146 - Gare de l'Est ↔ Gare de Survilliers-Fosses. Every 60 minutes.
- N147 - Gare de l'Est ↔ Persan. Every 60 minutes.
- N148 - Gare de l'Est ↔ Taverny. Every 85 minutes.
- N150 - Gare Saint-Lazare ↔ Cergy Le Haut. Every 30 minutes.
- N151 - Gare Saint-Lazare ↔ Gare de Mantes-la-Jolie. Every 60 minutes.
- N152 - Gare Saint-Lazare ↔ Cergy Le Haut. Every 60–70 minutes.
- N153 - Gare Saint-Lazare ↔ Saint Germain-en-Laye. Every 60 minutes.
- N154 - Gare Saint-Lazare ↔ Montigny – Beauchamp. Every 70 minutes.
- N155 - Gare Saint-Lazare ↔ Gare de Poissy. Every 60 minutes.

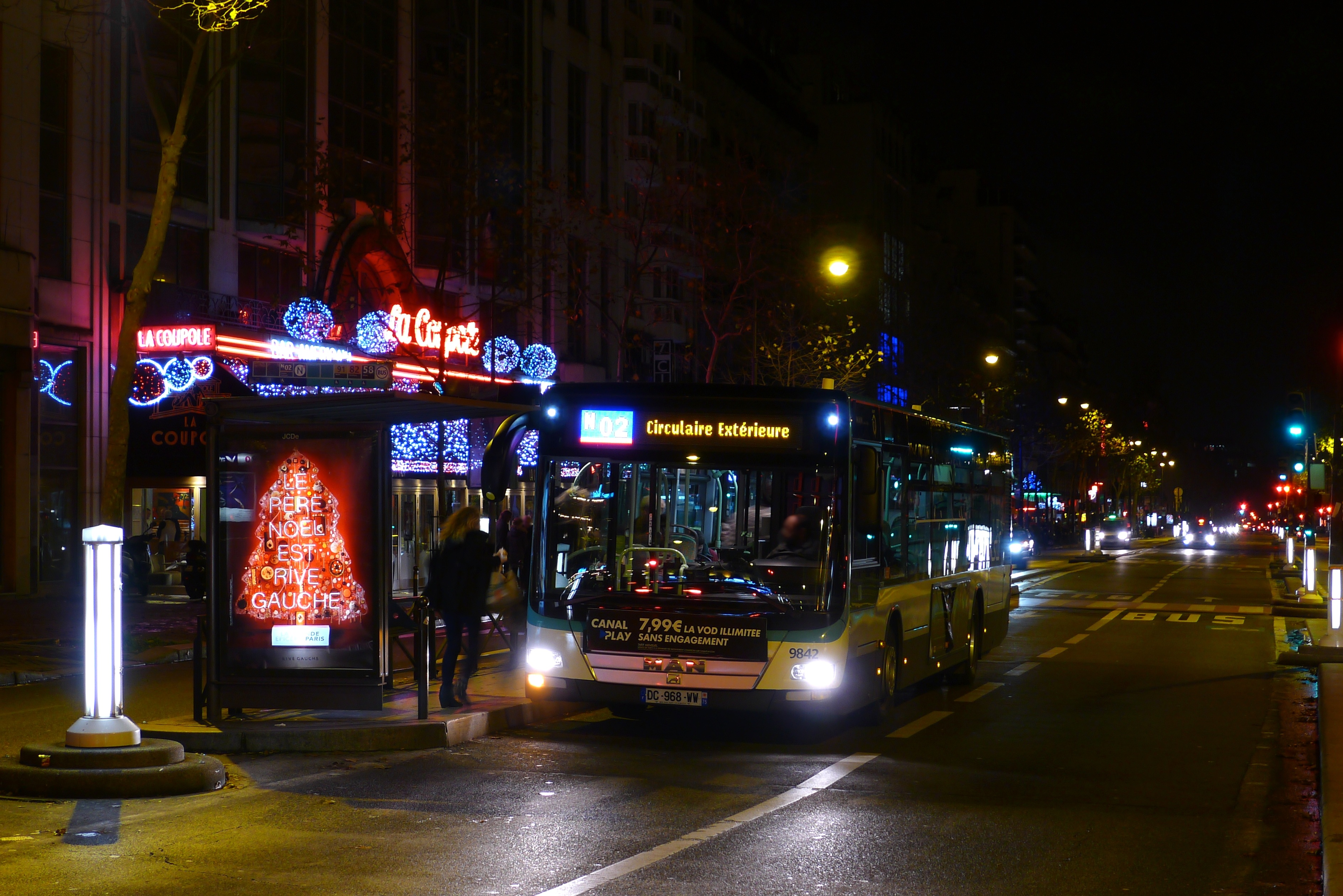
Noctilien Bus N02 at Vavin near Paris-Gare Montparnasse

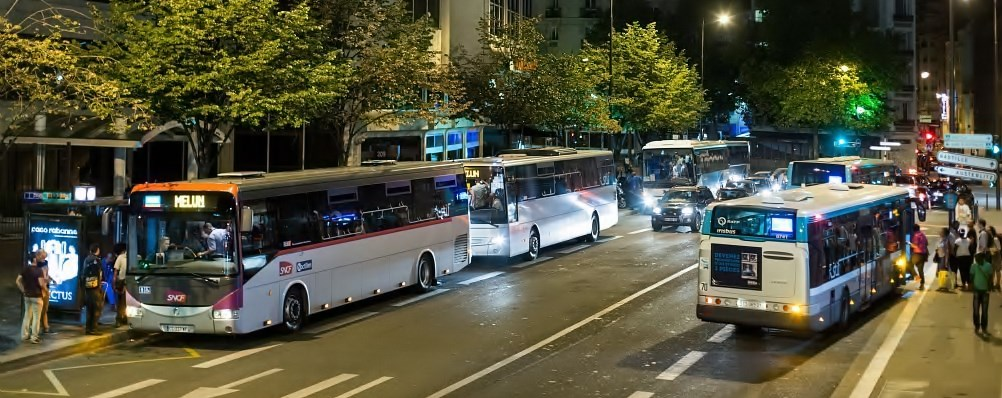
Several Noctilien Buses at Paris-Gare de Lyon hub bus station (Rue de Bercy)
