= Paris-Est–Mulhouse-Ville railway =

French railway line

Paris-Est - Mulhouse-Ville railway
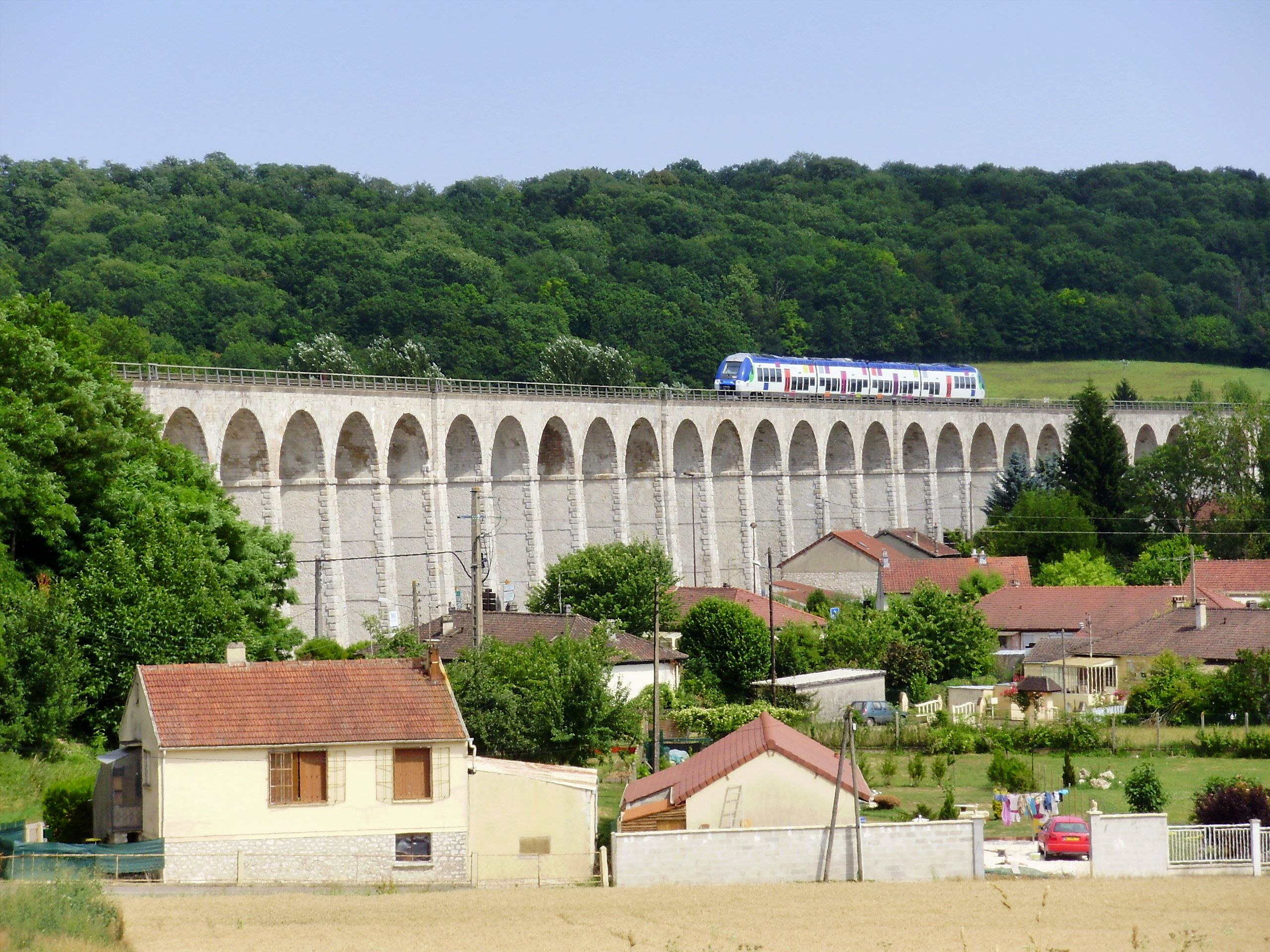
- The railway at Longueville, Seine-et-Marne

Overview
- Status: Operational
- Owner: SNCF
- Locale: France (Île-de-France, Grand Est, Bourgogne-Franche-Comté)
- Termini: Gare de l'Est, Paris; Gare de Mulhouse

Service
- System: SNCF
- Operator(s): SNCF

History
- Opened: 1848–1858

Technical
- Line length: 491 km (305 mi)
- Number of tracks: Double track
- Track gauge: 1,435 mm (4 ft 8 1/2 in) standard gauge
- Electrification: partly 25 kV 50 Hz

The railway from Paris-Est to Mulhouse-Ville is a 491-kilometre long railway line, that connects Paris to Mulhouse via Troyes, Chaumont and Belfort, France. The railway was opened in several stages between 1848 and 1858.

== Route ==
The Paris–Mulhouse railway leaves the Gare de l'Est in Paris in eastern direction. At Noisy-le-Sec, where the Paris–Strasbourg railway branches off, it turns south. It crosses the river Marne at Nogent-sur-Marne, and turns southeast. Near Gouaix it reaches the river Seine, and follows this river upstream, until Nogent-sur-Seine on its right bank, then on its left bank, roughly southeastward. At Troyes it crosses the Seine again, and turns east.

It enters the Aube valley near Jessains, and continues upstream along Bar-sur-Aube. It leaves the Aube and enters the upper Marne valley at Chaumont. It passes Langres and the railway junction Culmont-Chalindrey, where it crosses the line Nancy–Dijon. It reaches the river Saône at Jussey, and follows it downstream until Port-sur-Saône, where it turns southeast to reach Vesoul. It turns east, passing Lure, Belfort, Dannemarie and Altkirch. Here it turns northeast and enters its terminus Mulhouse.

=== Main stations ===
The main stations on the Paris–Mulhouse railway are:

- Gare de l'Est, Paris
- Gare de Troyes
- Gare de Culmont-Chalindrey
- Gare de Belfort
- Gare de Mulhouse

== History ==
The construction and exploitation of a railway from Paris to Mulhouse was conceded to the newly formed Chemins de fer de l'Est in 1853. The first section that was opened in 1848 led from Flamboin-Gouaix to Troyes, and was part of a railway from Montereau-Fault-Yonne to Troyes. The section from Paris to Noisy-le-Sec was opened in 1849, as a part of the Paris–Strasbourg railway. In 1856 a line from Noisy-le-Sec to Nogent-sur-Marne was built. The sections between Nogent-sur-Marne and Flamboin-Gouaix, between Troyes and Langres, and between Dannemarie and Mulhouse were opened in 1857. Finally in 1858 the section between Langres and Dannemarie was opened.

== Services ==
The Paris–Mulhouse railway is used by the following passenger services:

- TGV on the section from Paris to Noisy-le-Sec
- TER Bourgogne-Franche-Comté and TER Grand Est regional services on the whole line
- Transilien regional services on the section between Paris and Longueville
- RER E Paris rapid transit on the section between Paris and Gretz-Armainvilliers
