= Boulevard de Magenta =

Boulevard in Paris, France

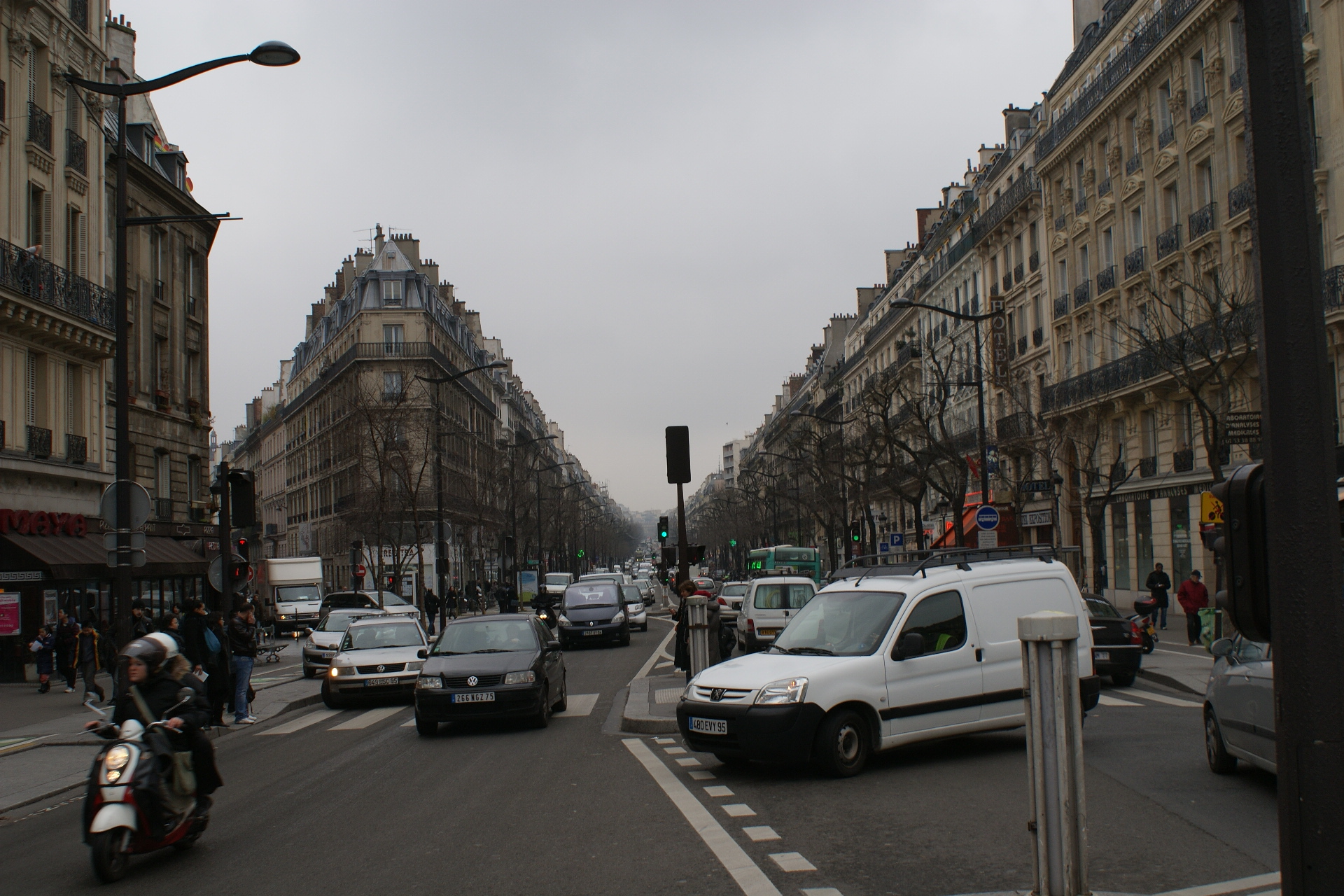
- View of Boulevard de Magenta

- Location within Paris
- Length: 1,920 m (6,300 ft)
- Width: 30 m (98 ft)
- Arrondissement: 9th, 10th
- Quarter: quartier Saint-Vincent-de-Paul quartier de la Porte-Saint-Denis quartier de la Porte-Saint-Martin
- Coordinates: 48°52′32″N 2°21′24″E
- From: place de la République
- To: boulevard de la Chapelle

Construction
- Completion: 1855 and 1859
- Denomination: 1855

The Boulevard de Magenta is located in the Ninth and Tenth arrondissements of Paris, France.

It begins at place de la République and 1, rue Beaurepaire, and ends at 1, boulevard de Rochechouart and 53, boulevard de la Chapelle.

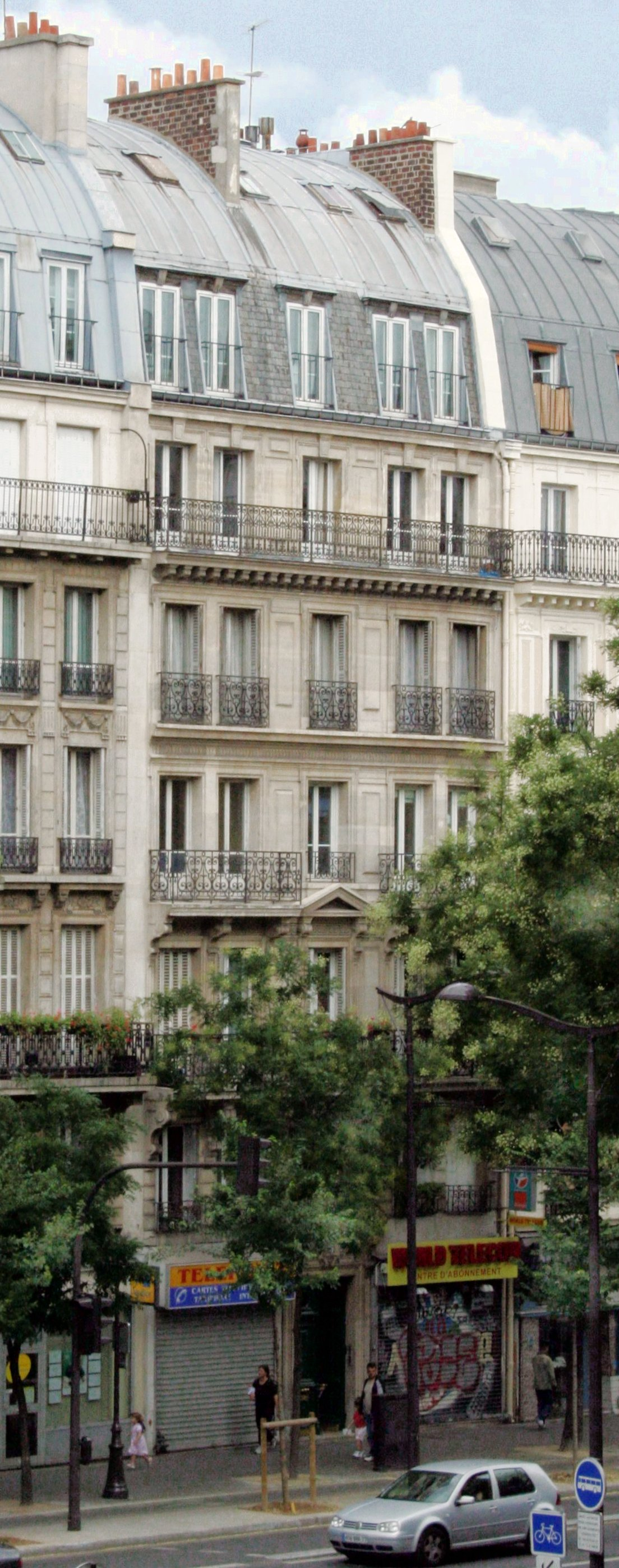
An immeuble de rapport on the Boulevard de Magenta

== Etymology ==
It is named after the battle of Magenta, a battle fought on 4 June 1859 near Magenta in Italy. It was a victory by the Piedmontais of the kingdom of Piedmont-Sardinia and by the French armée d'Italie under general Patrice de MacMahon and Napoléon III over the Austrians under Guylay.

== History ==
The creation of the boulevard de Magenta was part of the Hausmannian transformation of Paris. It was completed in 1855 between rue du Faubourg-Saint-Martin and the boulevard de Rochechouart (the boulevard here in fact follows the route of the old rue du Nord which formed a part of an 1827 subdivision) and in 1859 between place de la République and rue du Faubourg-Saint-Martin.

== Stations ==
=== Métro ===
- République
- Jacques-Bonsergent
- Barbès - Rochechouart

=== RER station ===
The RER station Magenta is located to the east of the gare du Nord and named after this boulevard, even if it is not truly under it. It is served by RER line E.

== Monuments ==
- n° 3 : Here lived Jacques Bonsergent, the first Parisian to be shot by the Nazis during the German occupation of France, on 23 December 1940.
- n° 24 : Site of the restaurant Véry, where the anarchist Ravachol was arrested on 30 March 1892. In revenge, the anarchists exploded a bomb here on the morning of 25 April that year.
- n° 68 : Église Saint-Laurent, built between 1863 and 1867.
- n° 85 bis : Marché Saint-Quentin installed here in 1866.
- n° 110 : Here lived the painter Georges Seurat.
- n° 170 : The Le Louxor cinema (façades and ceilings inscribed as a Monument historique), an Egyptian looking monument built by architect Henri-André Zipcy in 1921.

== Sources ==
- Jacques Hillairet, Dictionnaire historique des rues de Paris, Minuit, Paris, 1963 (ISBN 2-7073-1054-9)
