= Édouard Martin (playwright) =

French playwright

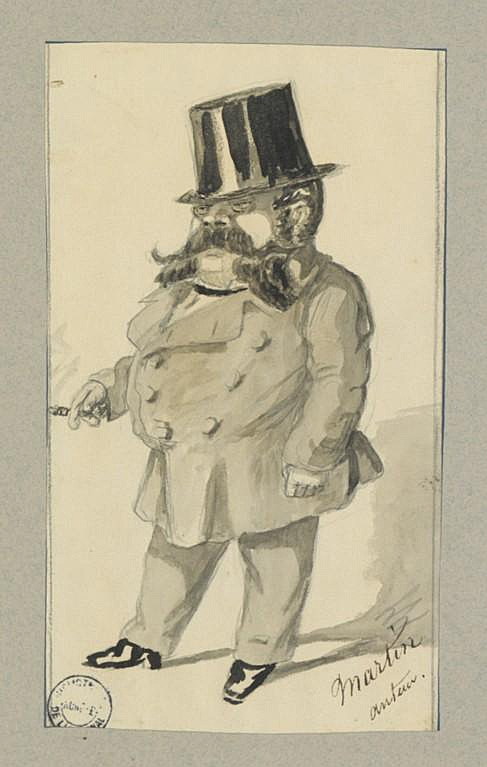
- Portrait of Édouard Martin by Lhéritier
- Born: Édouard Joseph Martin; 19 July 1825; Melun, Seine-et-Marne, France
- Died: 10 July 1866 (aged 40); 10th arrondissement of Paris, France
- Occupation: Playwright

Édouard Martin, full name Édouard Joseph Martin, (19 July 1825 – 13 July 1866) was a 19th-century French playwright.

When he was a young dramatist and a friend of Edmond About and Théophile Gautier, Édouard Martin was known for the comedies he wrote in collaboration with Eugène Labiche, Albert Monnier and Paul Siraudin, during the Second French Empire.

Suffering from mental illness in 1864, he died at the municipal nursing home Dubois (today hôpital Fernand-Widal) 13 July 1866. At his burial at Saint-Denis on 14 July, it was Léon Gozlan who delivered his eulogy.

== Works ==
- 1853: Collégiens, étudiants et mercadets pour rire
- 1855: Sous un parapluie, with Albert Monnier and Paul Siraudin
- 1859: Madame Absalon, with Paul Siraudin
- 1860: Jeune de cœur, with Émile de Najac
- 1863: La Fleur des braves, withavec Ernest Mouchelet

=== Plays written in collaboration with Labiche and/or Monnier ===
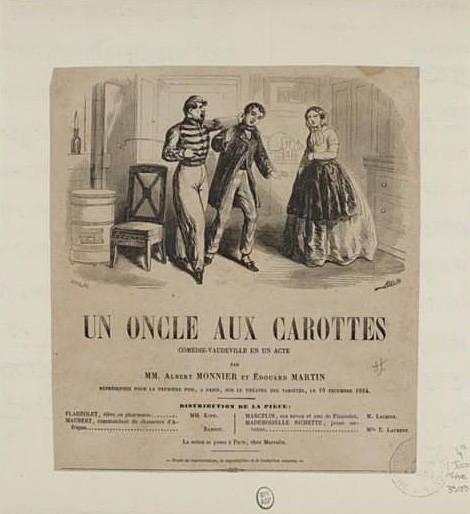
Un oncle aux carottes, in collaboration with Albert Monnier

- 1852: L'Argent par les fenêtres
- 1852: Le Droit de visite
- 1855: Un oncle aux carottes
- 1856: As-tu tué le mandarin ?
- 1857: L'Affaire de la rue de Lourcine
- 1857: Les Noces de Bouchencœur
- 1858: Chez une petite dame
- 1859: L'Amour, un fort volume, prix 3 F 50 c
- 1859: Les Petites Mains
- 1860: Le Voyage de monsieur Perrichon
- 1860: Le Pantalon de Nessus
- 1861: Les Vivacités du capitaine Tic
- 1861: La Poudre aux yeux
- 1862: Le Bataillon de la Moselle
- 1862: Les 37 Sous de M. Montaudoin
- 1863: La Commode de Victorine
- 1864: Moi
- 1864: Les Truffes
- 1864: Le Petit de la rue du Ponceau
- 1865: Histoire d'une patrouille
- 1867: La Main leste
