= Barbès–Rochechouart station =

Métro station in Paris, France

Barbès–Rochechouart
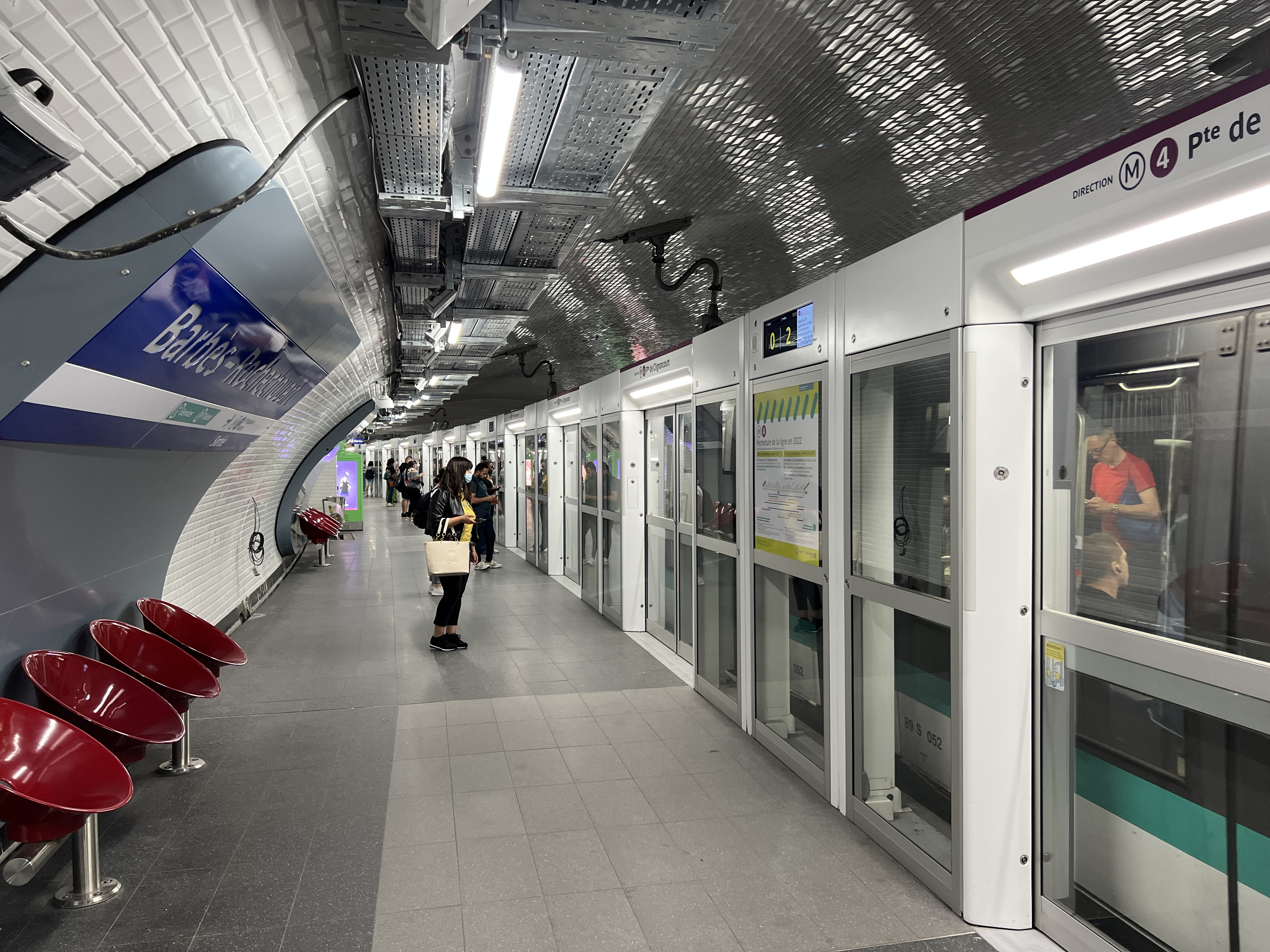
- Line 4 platforms, after the installation of Platform Screen Doors.

General information
- Location: Boul. de la Chapelle × Boul. Magenta; Boul. de la Chapelle × Boul. Barbès; 1, Boul. Rochechouart; 2, Boul. Rochechouart; 45, Boul. de la Chapelle; 9th, 10th and 18th arrondissement of Paris; Île-de-France; France
- Coordinates: 48°53′01″N 2°21′02″E
- Owner: RATP
- Operator: RATP

Other information
- Fare zone: 1

History
- Opened: 31 January 1903; 123 years ago (Line 2); 21 April 1908; 118 years ago (Line 4)
- Former names: Barbès (1903–1907)

Services
Preceding station	Paris Metro	Following station
Anvers towards Porte Dauphine	Line 2	La Chapelle towards Nation
Gare du Nord towards Bagneux–Lucie Aubrac	Line 4	Château Rouge towards Porte de Clignancourt
Location
- Location within Paris

Barbès–Rochechouart (French pronunciation: [baʁbɛs ʁɔʃ(ə)ʃwaʁ]) is a station on Line 2 and Line 4 of the Paris Métro. Situated at the location where the 9th, 10th and 18th arrondissements all share a border point, the station is at the junction of Boulevard Barbès, named for the revolutionary Armand Barbès, the Boulevard de Rochechouart, named for the abbess, Marguerite de Rochechouart, Boulevard de la Chapelle and Boulevard de Magenta.

== Location ==
The station is located at the intersection of four boulevards: Boulevard de Magenta, Boulevard de la Chapelle, Boulevard Barbès and Boulevard Marguerite-de-Rochechouart.

The station is the former location of the Barrière Poissonnière, a gate in the Wall of the Farmers-General built for the collection of excise taxes (the octroi). The gate was built between 1784 and 1788, and it was demolished in the nineteenth century.

== History ==
The elevated Line 2 station was opened on 31 January 1903 as Boulevard Barbès station, as part of the extension of Line 2 from Anvers to Bagnolet (now called Alexandre Dumas). It was renamed to its current name eight days later, becoming the first station in the Paris metro named for a woman. Line 2 descends into a tunnel to the west of the station. The underground Line 4 station was opened on 21 April 1908 as part of the first section of the line from Châtelet to Porte de Clignancourt.

The disastrous fire of 10 August 1903 that resulted in eighty deaths at Couronnes station began at Barbès–Rochechouart. During World War II, on 21 August 1941, Pierre Georges and three companions of the French Resistance shot and killed a German naval cadet named Alfons Moser when he was boarding a train at the Barbès station at eight in the morning. The killing was in revenge for the execution of Samuel Tyszelman for taking part in an anti-German demonstration. This was the start of a series of assassinations and reprisals that resulted in five hundred French hostages being executed in the next few months.

During work carried out in 1987, the Hector Guimard's entrance was transferred to the Bolivar metro station. The station was renovated in 1998.

On 2 December 2016, a train derailed at the station, with no casualties but blocked traffic for 48 hours on part of the line. The derailment was caused by the fall of an inverter boot from the train, located under the body of car.

In 2019, 7,974,496 travelers entered this station which placed it at the 29th position of the metro stations for its usage.

== Passenger services ==
=== Access ===
Access to the Barbès-Rochechouart metro station is located on Boulevard Marguerite-de-Rochechouart, Boulevard Barbès and Boulevard de la Chapelle at the limit of the 9th, 10th and 18th arrondissements of Paris.

=== Station layout ===
Platform level	Side platform, doors will open on the right
Platform level	Westbound	← toward Porte Dauphine (Anvers)
Platform level	Eastbound	toward Nation (La Chapelle) →
Platform level	Side platform, doors will open on the right

1F	Mezzanine for Line 2 platform connection

Street Level

B1	Mezzanine for Line 4 platform connection

Line 4 platforms	Side platform with PSDs, doors will open on the right
Line 4 platforms	Northbound	← toward Porte de Clignancourt (Château Rouge)
Line 4 platforms	Southbound	toward Bagneux–Lucie Aubrac (Gare du Nord) →
Line 4 platforms	Side platform with PSDs, doors will open on the right

=== Platforms ===
The two lines have standard configuration stations with two platforms framing the two tracks.

The station of line 2 is elevated, located on a viaduct which ends shortly after leaving the station in the direction of Porte Dauphine. The platforms of line 4 are underground and curved. In the direction of Porte de Clignancourt, it is possible to see the Château Rouge station.

As part of the automation of line 4, its station is being modernized, leading to the removal of its Ouï-dire style. Its platforms have been raised to accommodate landing doors.

=== Bus connections ===
The station is served by lines 31, 54, 56 and 85 of the RATP Bus Network and, at night, by lines N01, N02, N14 and N44 of the Noctilien network.

== Nearby ==
- The environment of the station, very cosmopolitan, on the edge of the Goutte d'Or district, is often associated with the immigrants, mainly from North Africa, but also from sub-Saharan Africa. It includes many retail and import businesses and department stores, including the Tati brand.
- Butte Montmartre, to the northwest, attracts many tourists.
- The Barbès market is located on Boulevard de la Chapelle, under the overhead metro viaduct.
- Le Louxor cinema, fully restored in 2013, has a terrace overlooking the metro station.
- The Lariboisière Hospital, establishment of the Assistance Publique–Hôpitaux de Paris (AP-HP), is to the south-east of the station.

== Gallery ==
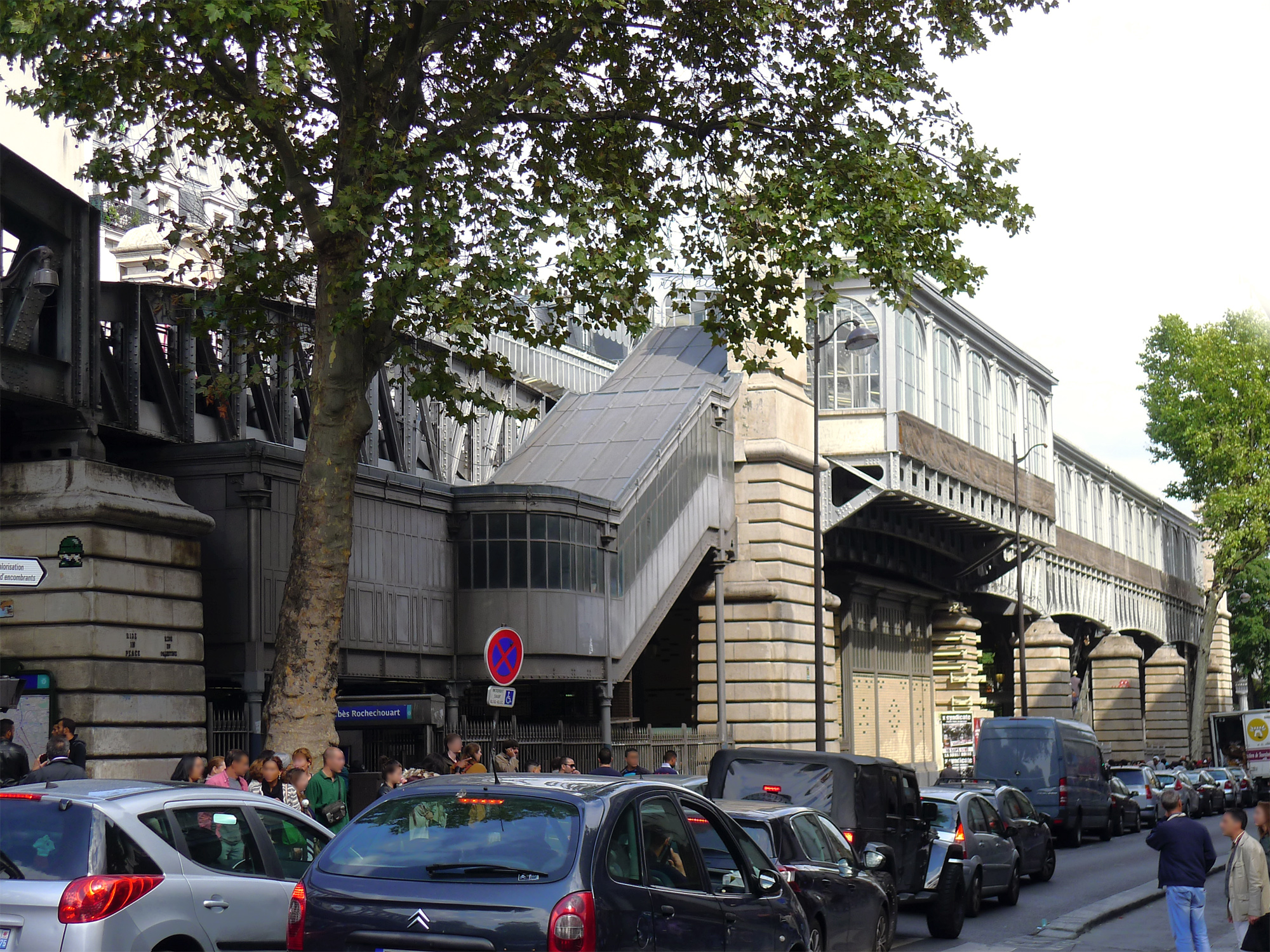
Barbès–Rochechouart station, outside.

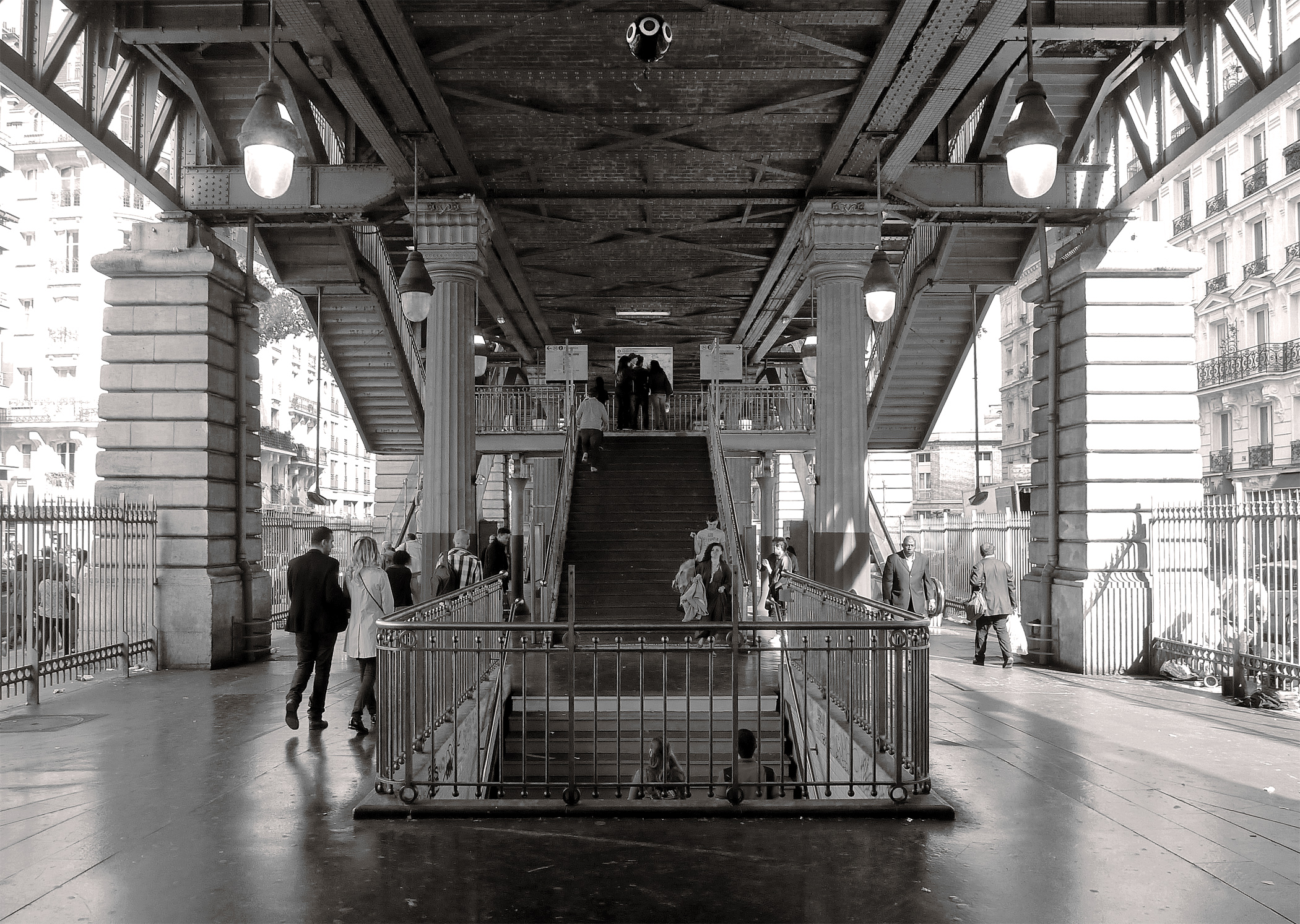
Entrance under Line 2 viaduct.

MF 2000 rolling stock arriving at Barbès–Rochechouart.
