= Quartier Saint-Vincent-de-Paul =

Quarter of Paris, France

Coordinates: 48.8795666°N 2.3572124°E

Saint-Vincent-de-Paul
- Quartier Saint-Vincent-de-Paul
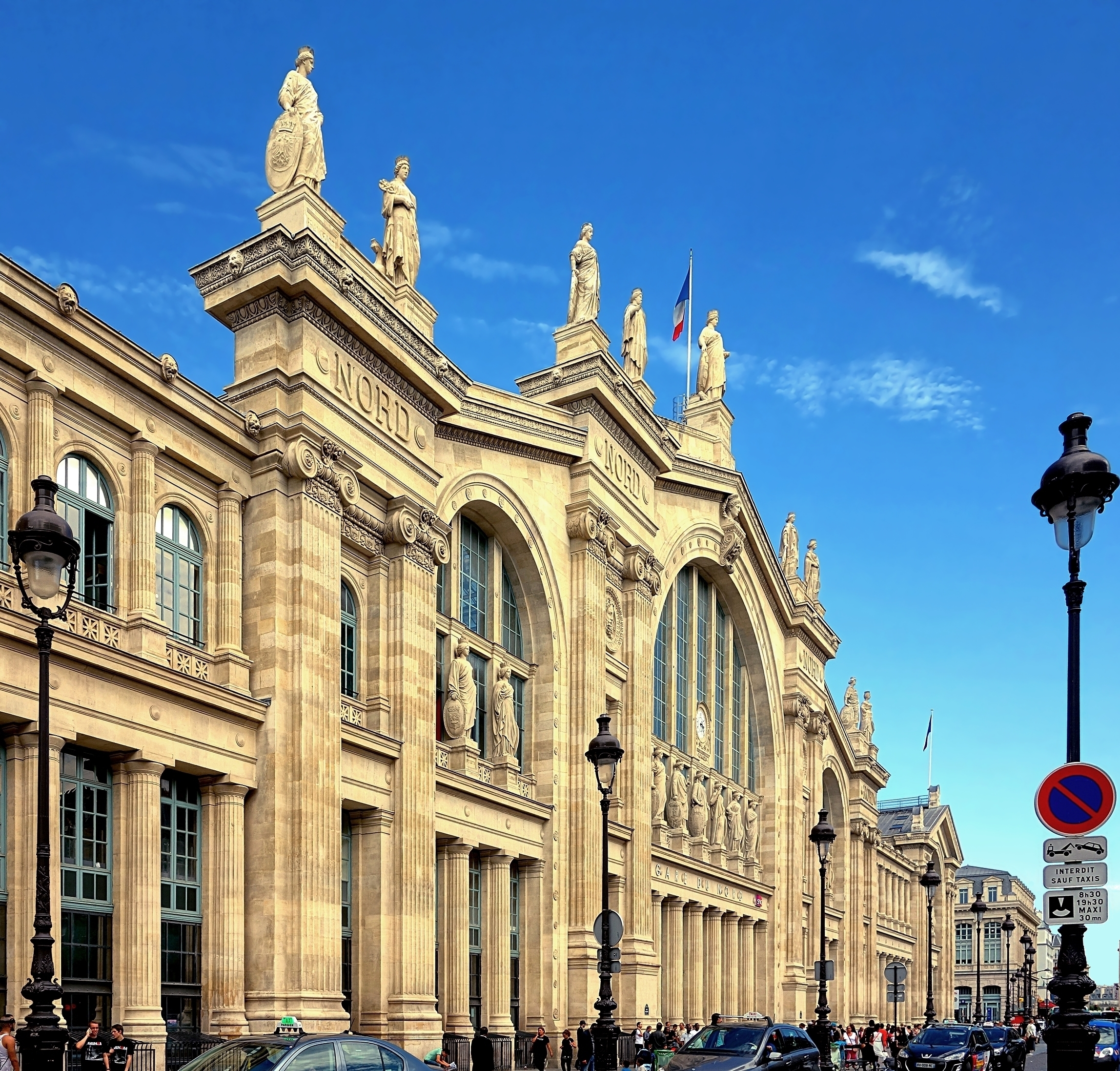
- Gare du Nord
- Interactive map of Saint-Vincent-de-Paul
- Country: France
- Region: Île-de-France
- Ville: Paris
- Arrondissement: 10th

Area
  - Total: 0.927 km^{2} (0.358 sq mi)

Population (2016)
  - Total: 23,547
  - Density: 25,401/km^{2} (65,790/sq mi)

The Quartier Saint-Vincent-de-Paul is the 37th quarter of Paris, located in the 10th arrondissement. It is named in honor of Vincent de Paul, situated on the site of the enclos Saint-Lazare—the location where he established the motherhouse of the religious order he founded, the Congregation of the Mission.

The Gare de l'Est and Gare du Nord railway stations are located within the district, as are the Lariboisière and Fernand-Widal hospitals.

Also found here are the Church of Saint-Vincent-de-Paul—opened for worship in 1844 and classified as a historical monument—as well as the Théâtre des Bouffes du Nord.

== Location and boundaries ==
The Saint-Vincent-de-Paul neighborhood is bounded to the west by the Rue du Faubourg-Poissonnière, to the north by the Boulevards de la Chapelle and de la Villette, to the east by the Rue du Faubourg Saint-Martin, and to the south by the Rue de Chabrol.

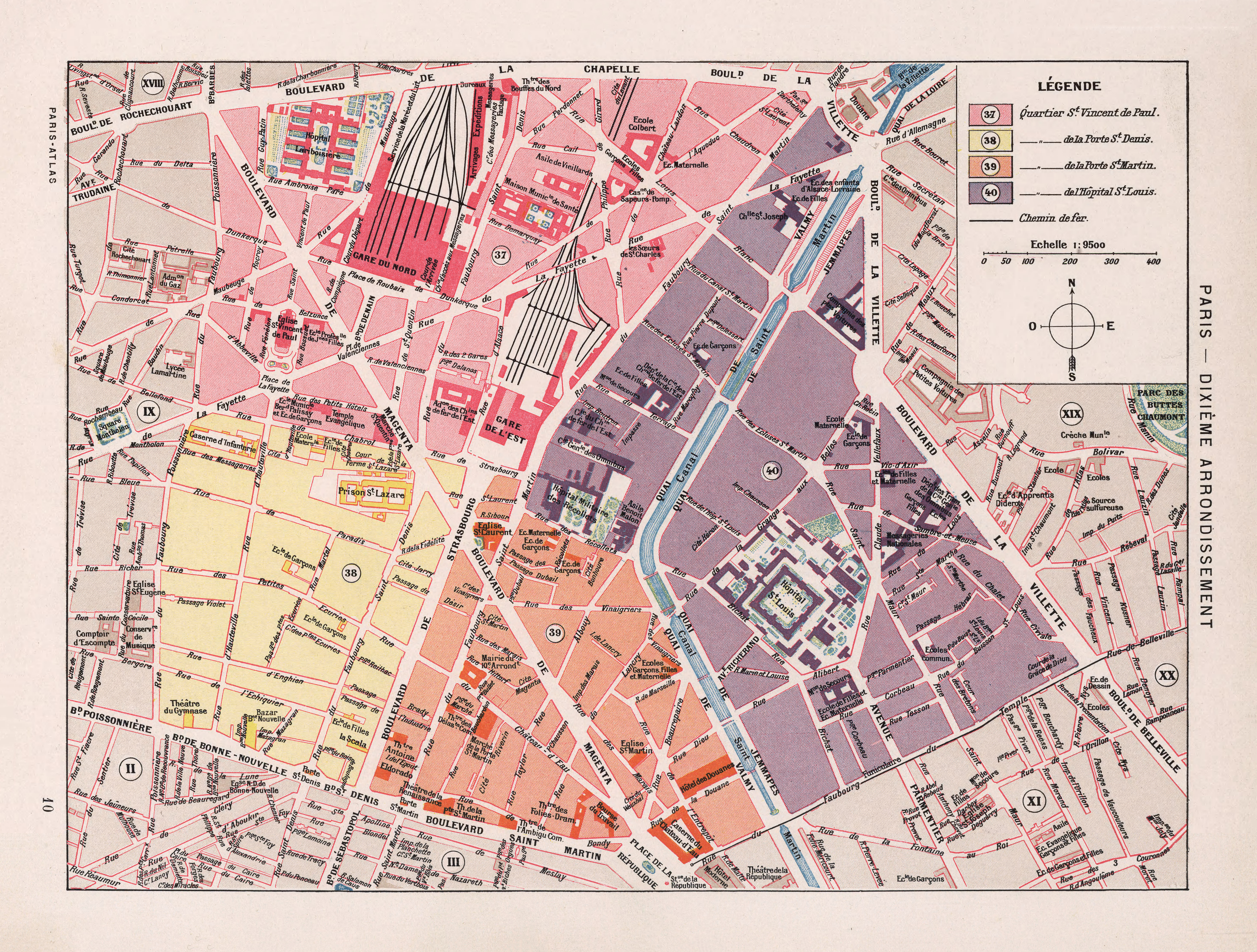
The quarters of the 10th arrondissement in 1900, according to Fernand Bournon’s atlas.

The current quarters of the 10th arrondissement.
