= Paul Antoine Dubois =

French obstetrician

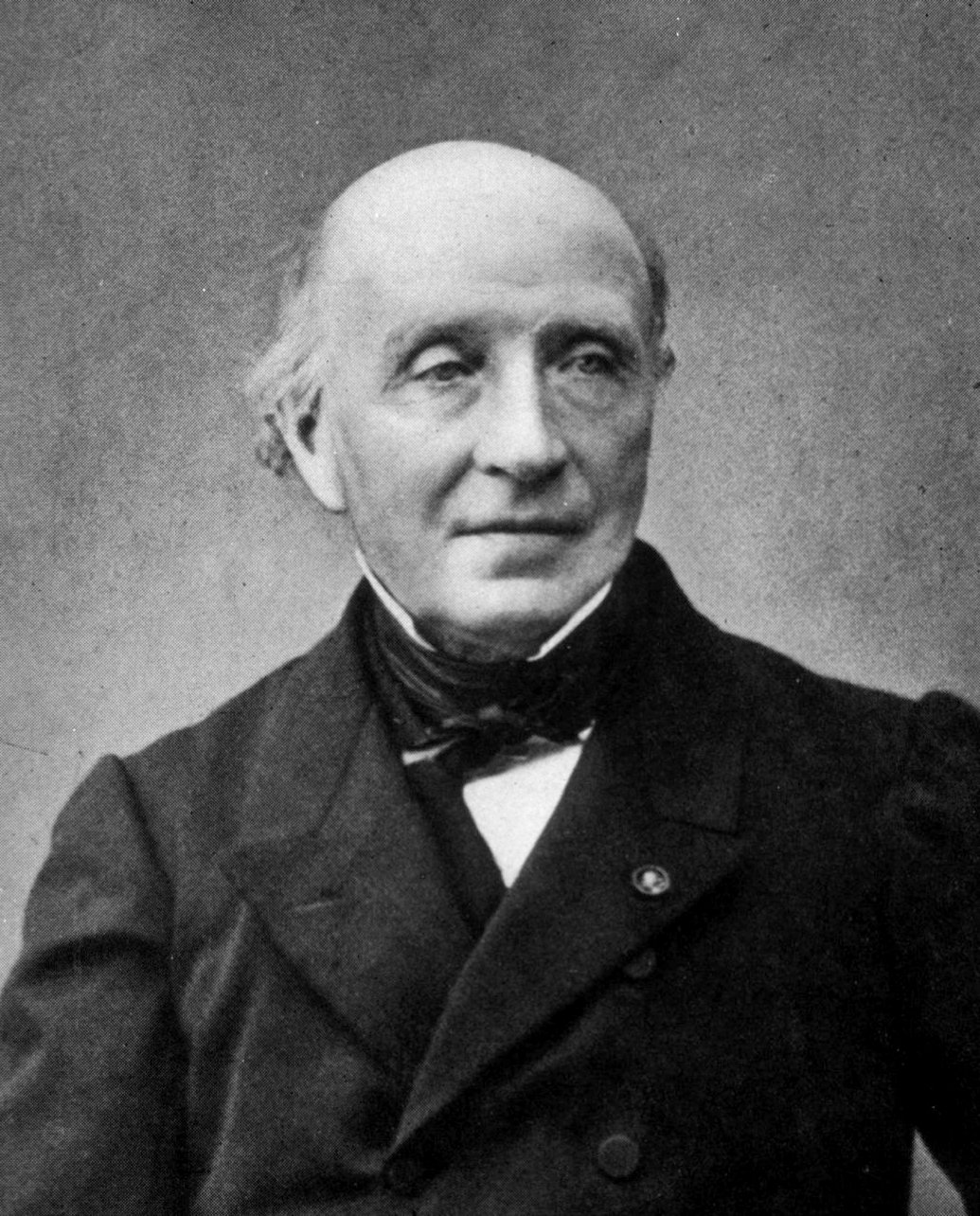
Paul Antoine Dubois

Paul Antoine Dubois (French pronunciation: [pɔl ɑ̃twan dybwa]; also Paul Antoine Dubis or Paul-Antoine Dubois; 7 December 1795 – December 1871) was a French obstetrician and the son of Antoine Dubois. He was born and died in Paris. In 1823 he succeeded his father at the maternity hospital that later was to become known as the Maison Dubois. In 1830 he was appointed professor of obstetrics in the faculty of medicine at the University of Paris, and soon became distinguished for his skill in diagnosis, his clear and eloquent manner of lecturing, and a peculiar facility for imparting knowledge. He became dean of the faculty in 1852, and in 1863 he was compelled to retire from active occupation, owing to a failure of memory, the first symptom of a mental disorder which became confirmed, and continued during the remainder of his life. His writings consisted entirely of contributions to medical journals.
