= Rue du Faubourg-Saint-Denis =

Street in Paris, France

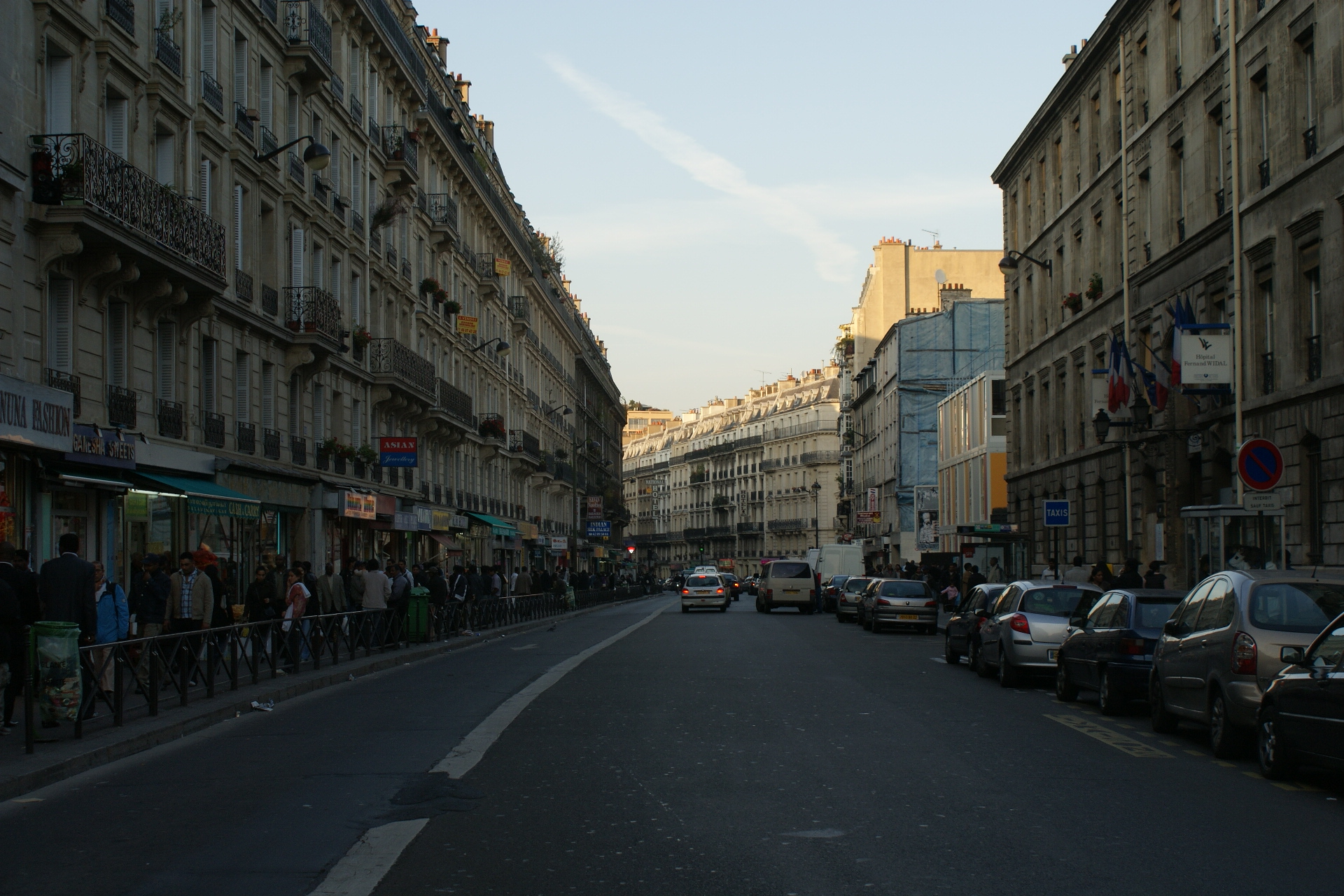
- Rue du Faubourg-Saint-Denis

- Location within Paris
- Length: 1,672 m (5,486 ft)
- Width: 17.5 to 20 m (57 to 66 ft)
- Arrondissement: 10th
- Quarter: Porte Saint-Denis and Saint-Vincent-de-Paul
- Coordinates: 48°52′23″N 2°21′16″E
- From: 2, Boulevard de Bonne-Nouvelle
- To: 37, Boulevard de la Chapelle

The Rue du Faubourg-Saint-Denis (French pronunciation: [ʁy dy fobuʁ sɛ̃ dəni]) is a street in the 10th arrondissement of Paris. It crosses the arrondissement from north to south, linking the Porte Saint-Denis to La Chapelle Métro station and passing the Gare du Nord.

== History ==
The Rue du Faubourg-Saint-Denis owes its name to the fact that it is an extension of the Rue Saint-Denis to the faubourg or area outside Paris's walls (as marked today by the Porte Saint-Denis). It also marked the eastern boundary of the enclos (later prison) Saint-Lazare.

Historically, this street was an extremely upper-class area, occupied by jewellers and textile merchants, since it was part of the King's processional route to the Basilica of Saint-Denis. After the French Revolution, the street briefly bore the name 'Rue du Faubourg Franciade' in 1793 (with the portion between the Rue Saint-Laurent and the Place de la Chapelle being renamed the Rue du Faubourg Saint-Lazare and the Rue du Faubourg de Gloire).

== Length ==
- From the Boulevard de Bonne-Nouvelle to the Boulevard de Magenta: 850 m
- Between the Boulevard de Magenta and the Rue Cail: 520 m
- From the Rue Cail to the Boulevard de la Chapelle: 300 m

== Points of interest ==
- On 19 August 1848, the street was the birthplace of painter Gustave Caillebotte
- Mistinguett, who made this street famous by singing "Je suis née dans le faubourg Saint-Denis", was actually born in Enghien-les-Bains.
- The "marchandes de quatre saisons" (The merchants [street vendors] of the four seasons) were typical of this street. They can be seen in the 1961 Jean-Luc Godard film Une femme est une femme, but have since been removed because they were causing traffic congestion.
- An old bouillon snackbar has become a fashionable brasserie, Bouillon Julien, well-known across Paris for its profiteroles (a pastry).
- A fashionable 'traiteur', Julhès (formerly Royal-Cabello, founded by Henri Lacour, then by M. Mauduit), known for its mille-feuilles (also a pastry).
- The training gymnasium of Marcel Cerdan is at no. 23, and the "Central sporting club de Boxe", featured in a scene from the 1954 film, L'Air de Paris, is at no. 57.
- The Reggiani family hairdressers' shop was at no. 83; Serge Reggiani evoked the spirit of this street in an autobiographical song.

== Connecting streets ==
- Passage Prado, known for its Art Deco decoration
- Passage Brady, known for its Indian and Pakistani restaurants
- Passage de l'Industrie.
