= Bouillon Julien =

Restaurant in the 10 arrondissement of Paris, France

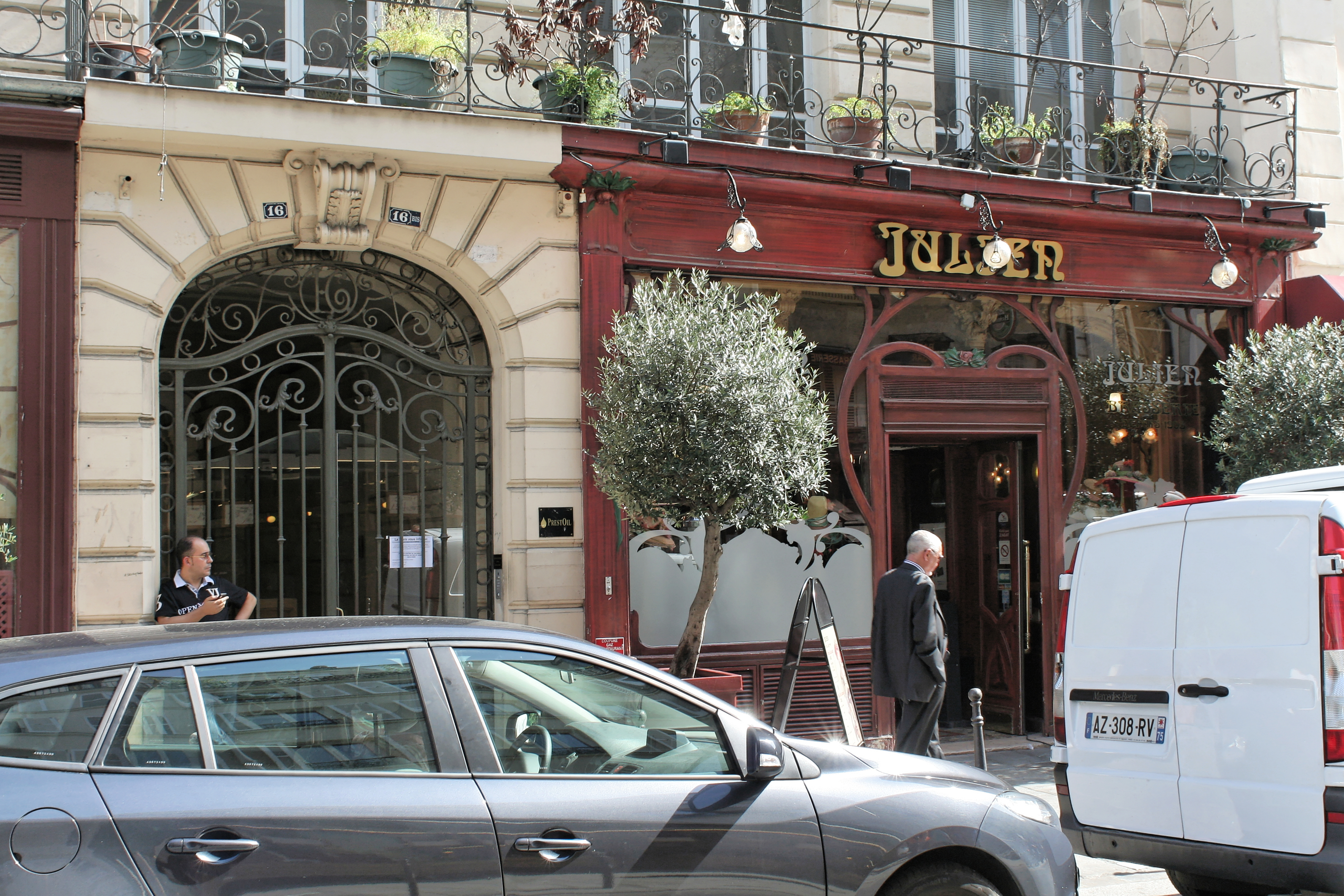
- The front façade of the restaurant
- Interactive map of Bouillon Julien
- Location: 16, rue du Faubourg Saint-Denis; 10th arrondissement of Paris; France
- Coordinates: 48°52′14″N 2°21′12″E
- Designer: Édouard Fournier (building); Louis Trézel, Armand Ségaud and Hippolyte Boulenger (restaurant room)
- Type: Brasserie, restaurant
- Beginning date: 1901
- Completion date: 1902
- Opening date: 1903
- Monument historique since 1997

Bouillon Julien, formerly Julien, is a brasserie-type restaurant in the 10th arrondissement of Paris, France. It was made an official Historical Monument for its Art Nouveau style.

== History ==
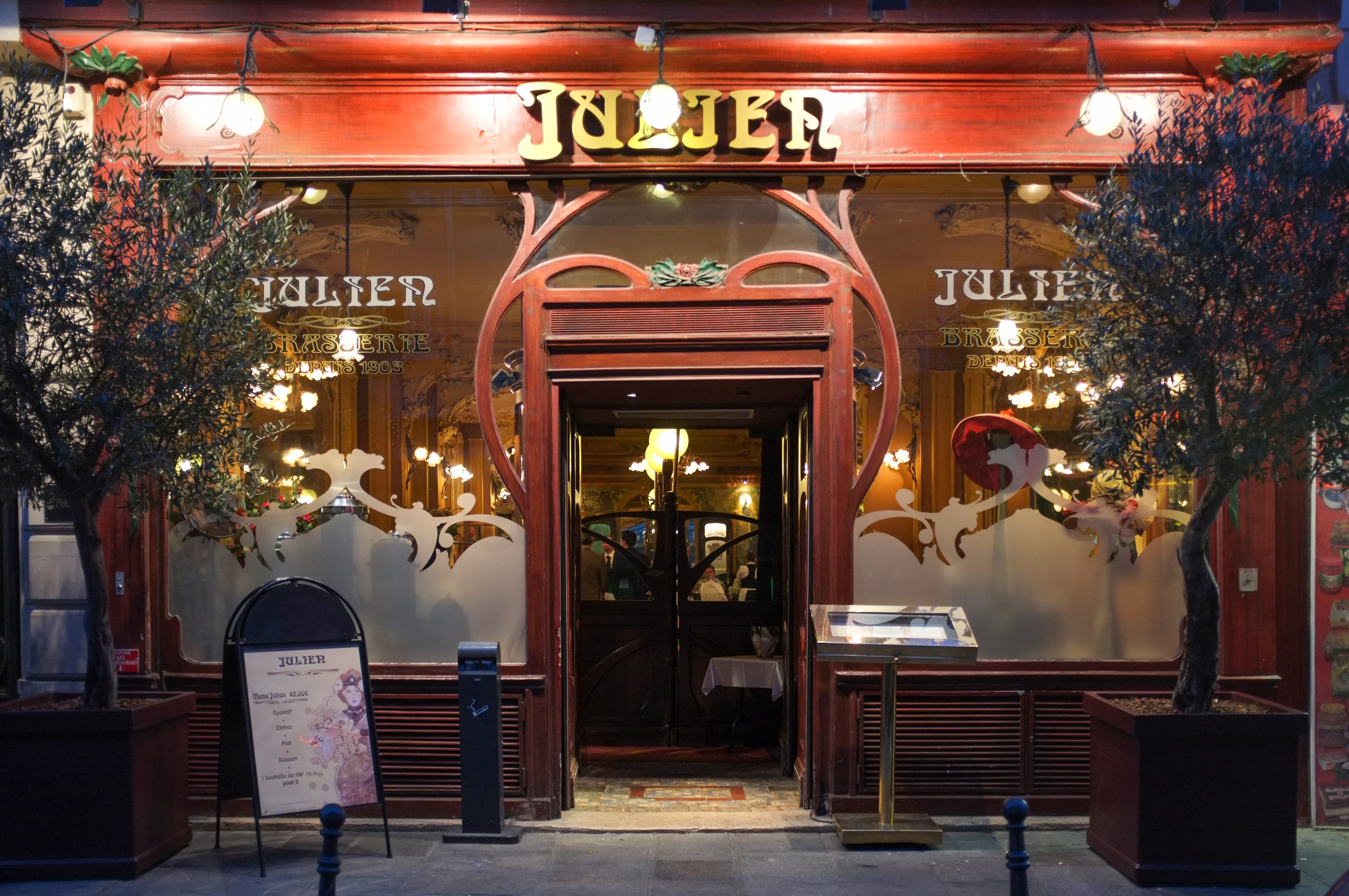
The entrance of the restaurant

In 1787, the building hosted the restaurant Le Cheval Blanc, became one of the first café-concerts.

The current building was erected in 1901–1902 by architect Édouard Fournier. The Art Nouveau restaurant was decorated by Louis Trézel, Armand Ségau and Hippolyte Boulenger, and opened in 1903 as Gandon-Fournier. In 1924, the establishment was handed over to Julien Barbarin. Several signs representing peacocks were made by Armand Ségaud, whereas the mahogany counter is attributed to cabinetmaker Louis Majorelle. Louis Trézel depicted four women on several sintered-glass panels inspired by Alfons Muchas's iconography.

The tiled floor, which depicts a wild aquilegia and daisy meadow, was crafted in Hippolyte Boulenger's pottery works in Choisy-le-Roi, whose headquarters where located in the neighborhood of the restaurant. At Julien Barbarin's request, Georges Guenne's company installed large window panes which let the natural light pour into the room; the drawings of the windows were made by Charles Buffer, the father of painter Bernard Buffet.

In 1938, the restaurant was renamed Julien (or Chez Julien).

In 1975, the establishment was purchased by Groupe Flo led by Jean-Paul Bucher.

The restaurant was renamed Bouillon Julien in 2018.

The restaurant room was classified a Historical Monument in 1997. The front façade and the roofs were listed in the same year.

== In popular culture ==
Singer Édith Piaf used to wait for Marcel Cerdan at table No. 24.

Several parts of the Olivier Dahan's film La Môme (2007) were shot at the restaurant, as well as scenes of Roschdy Zem's film Chocolat (2016).

== Gallery ==
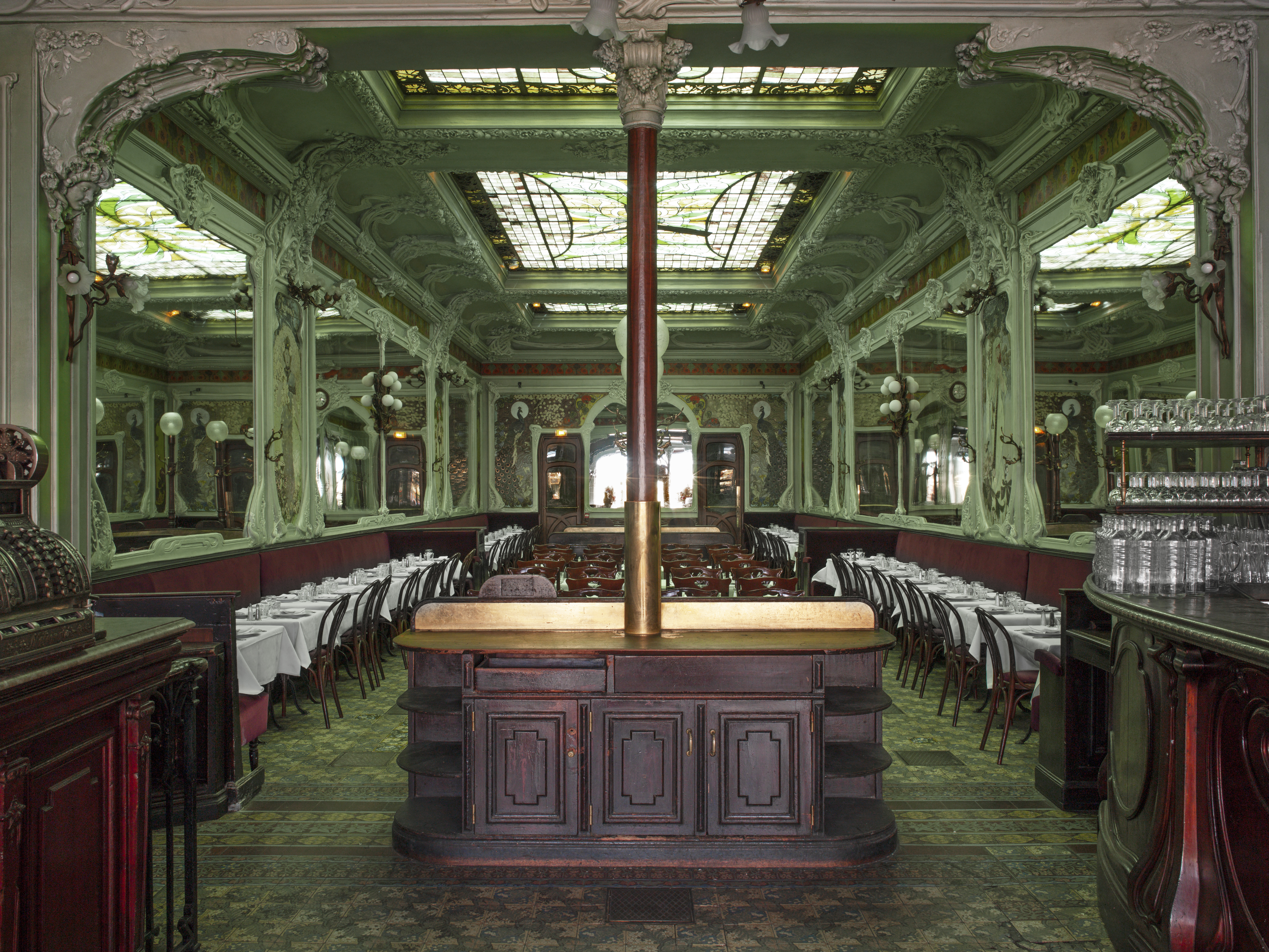

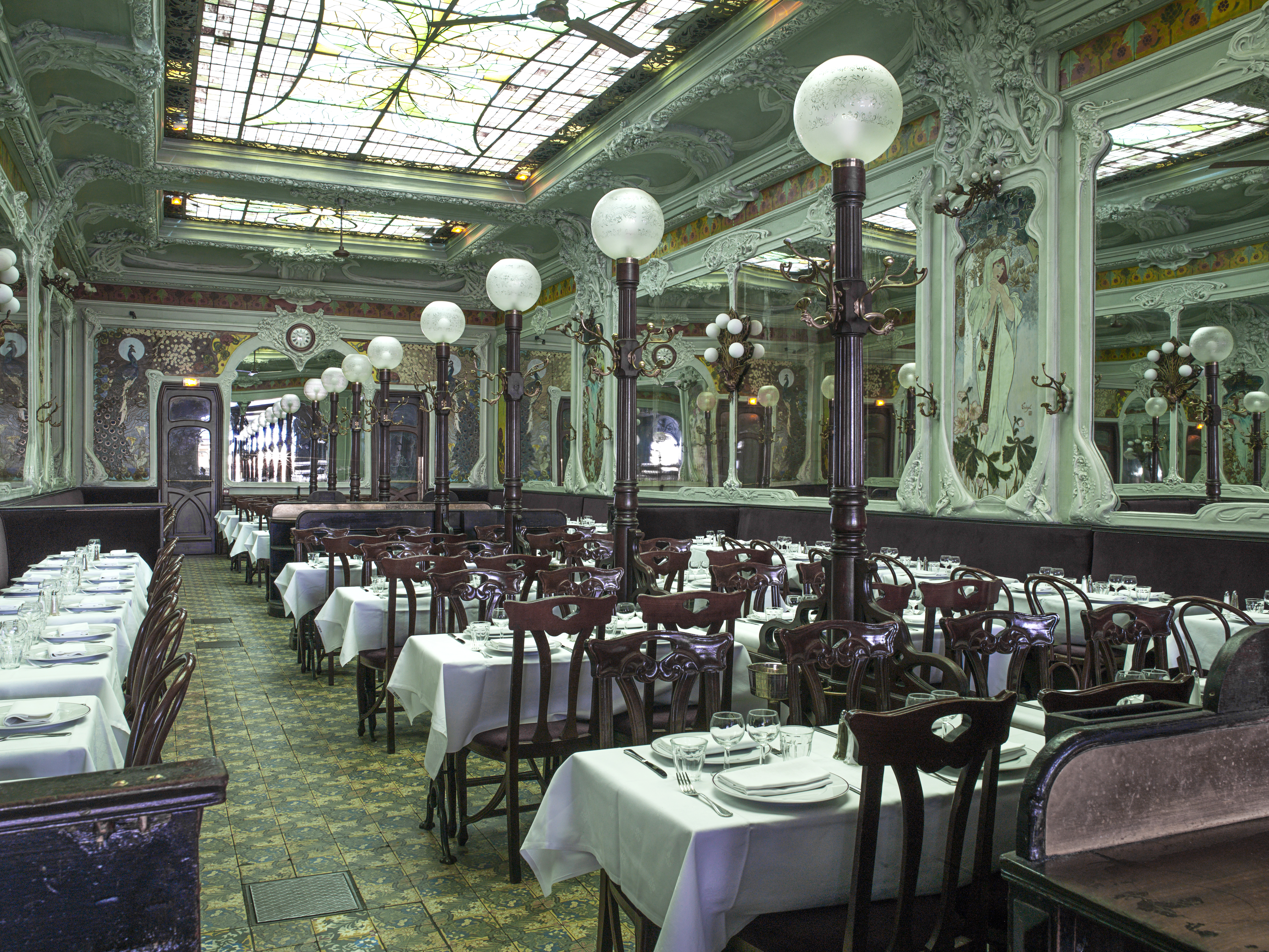

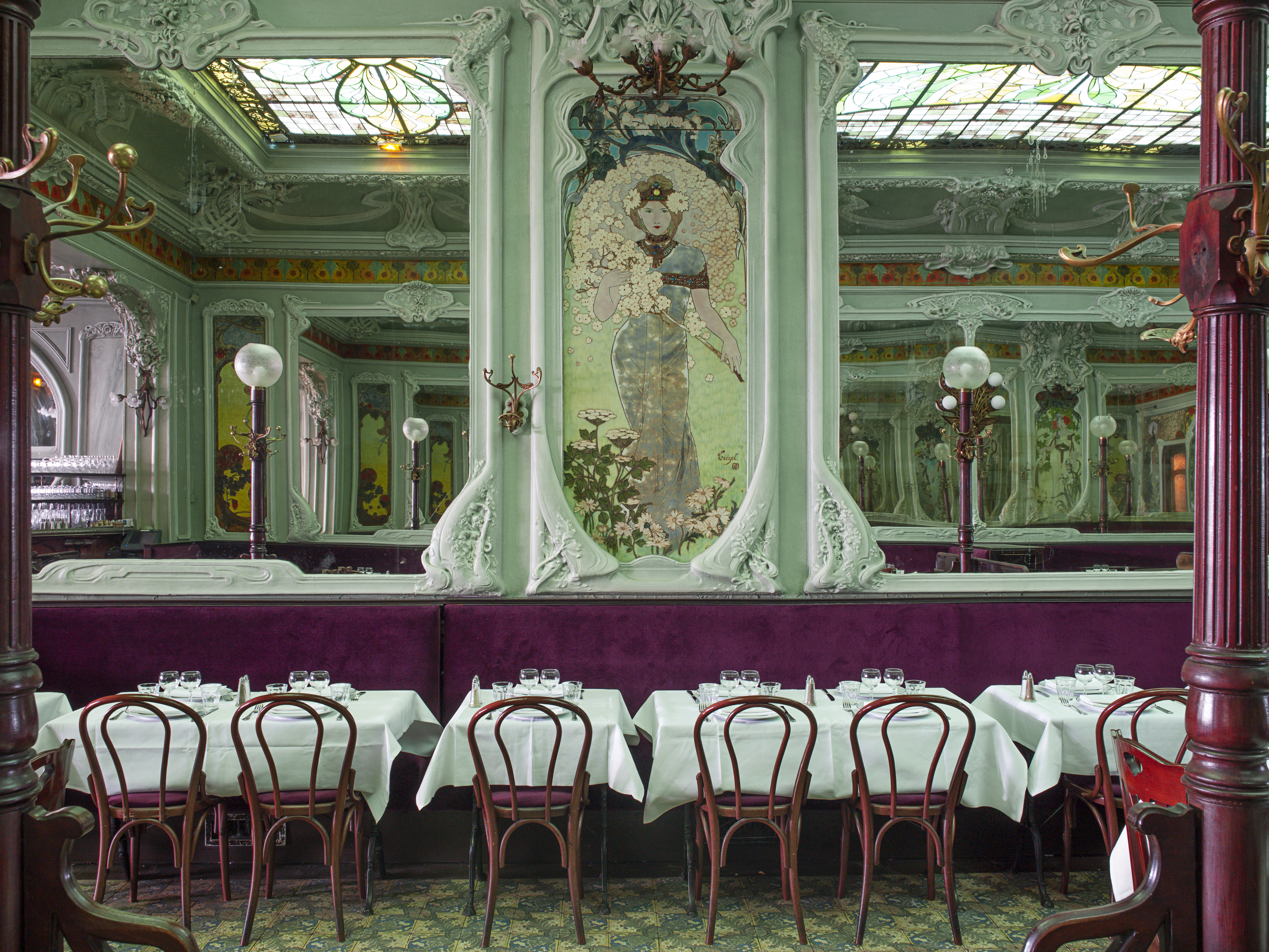

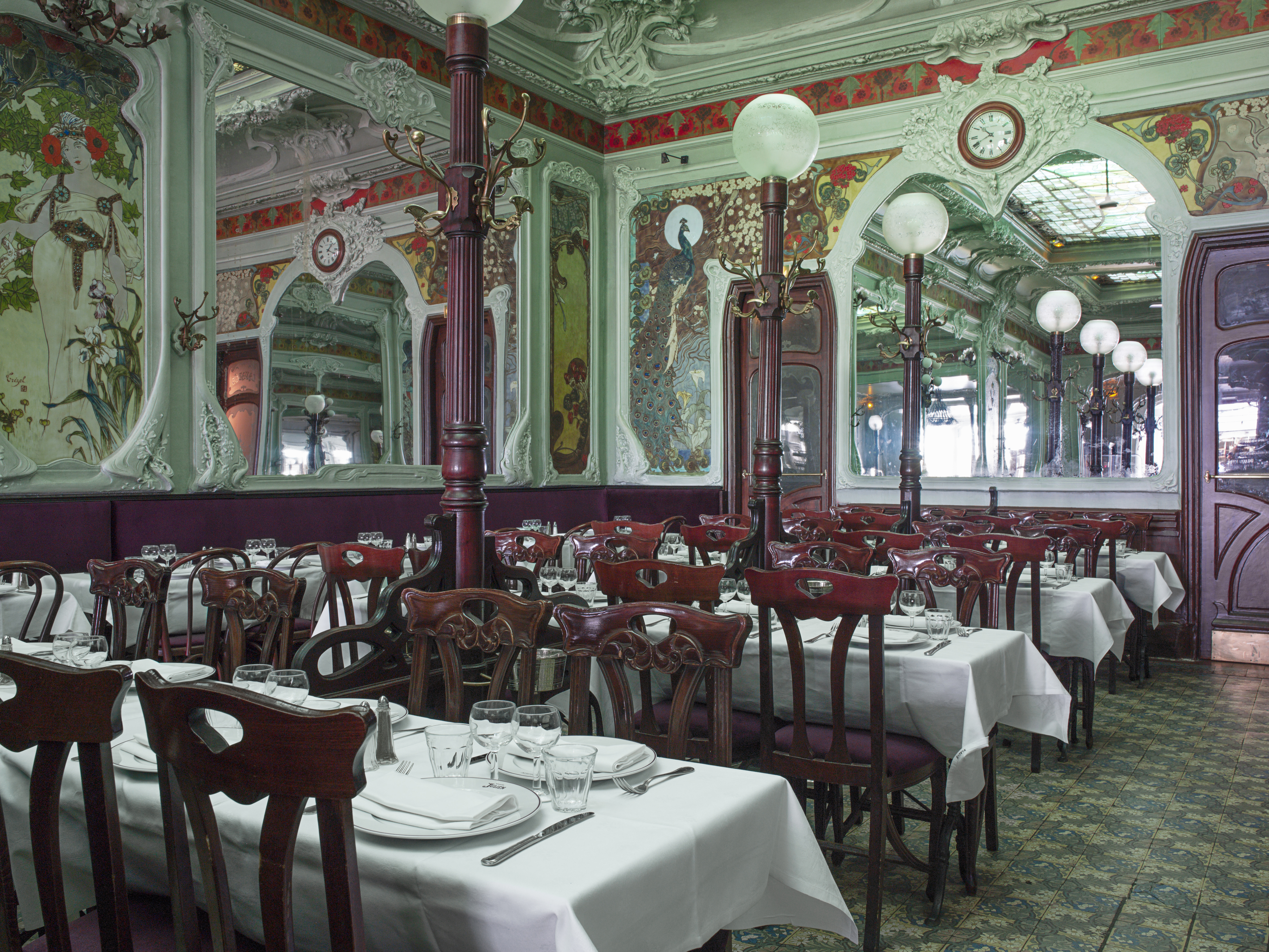

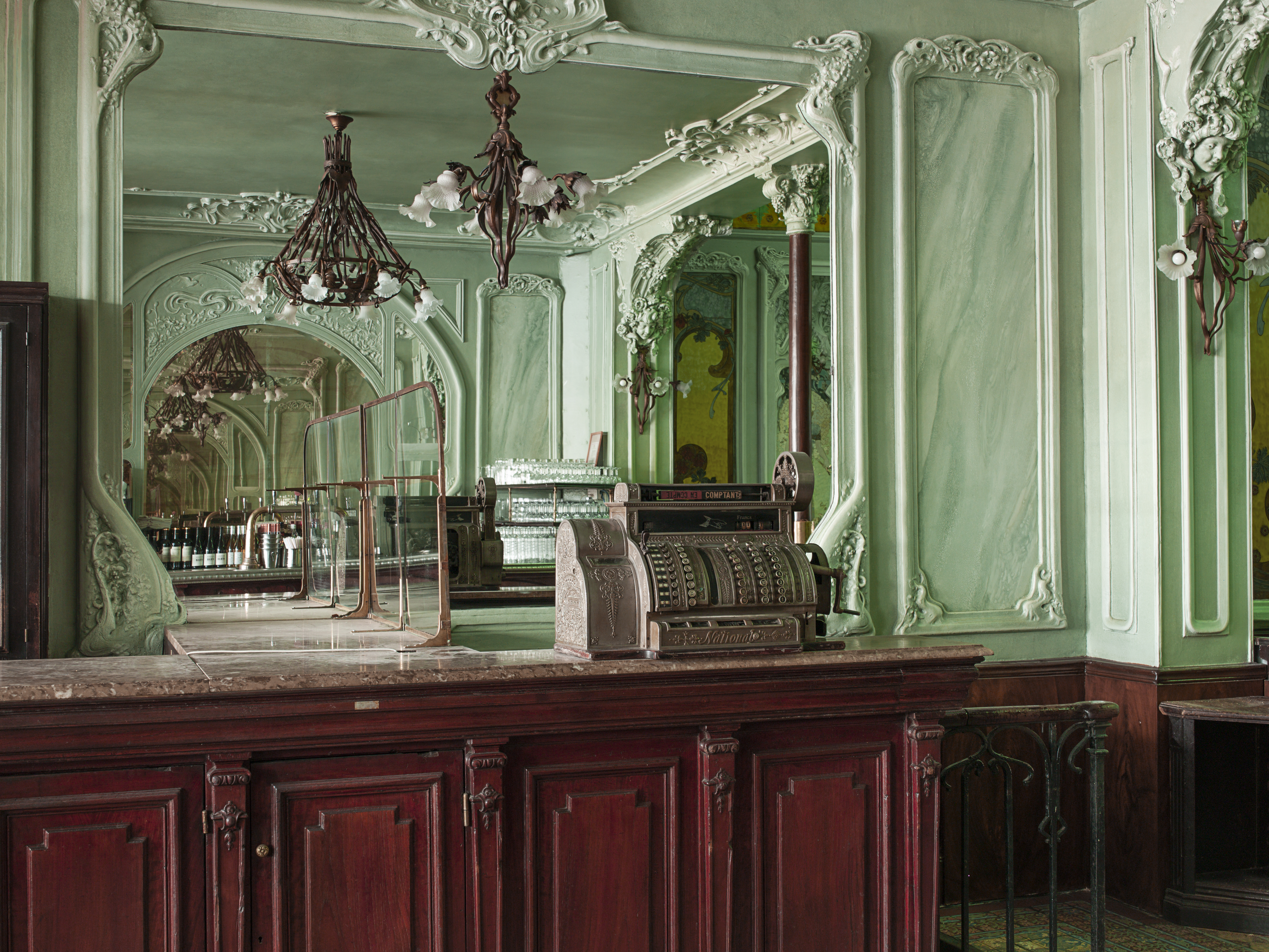

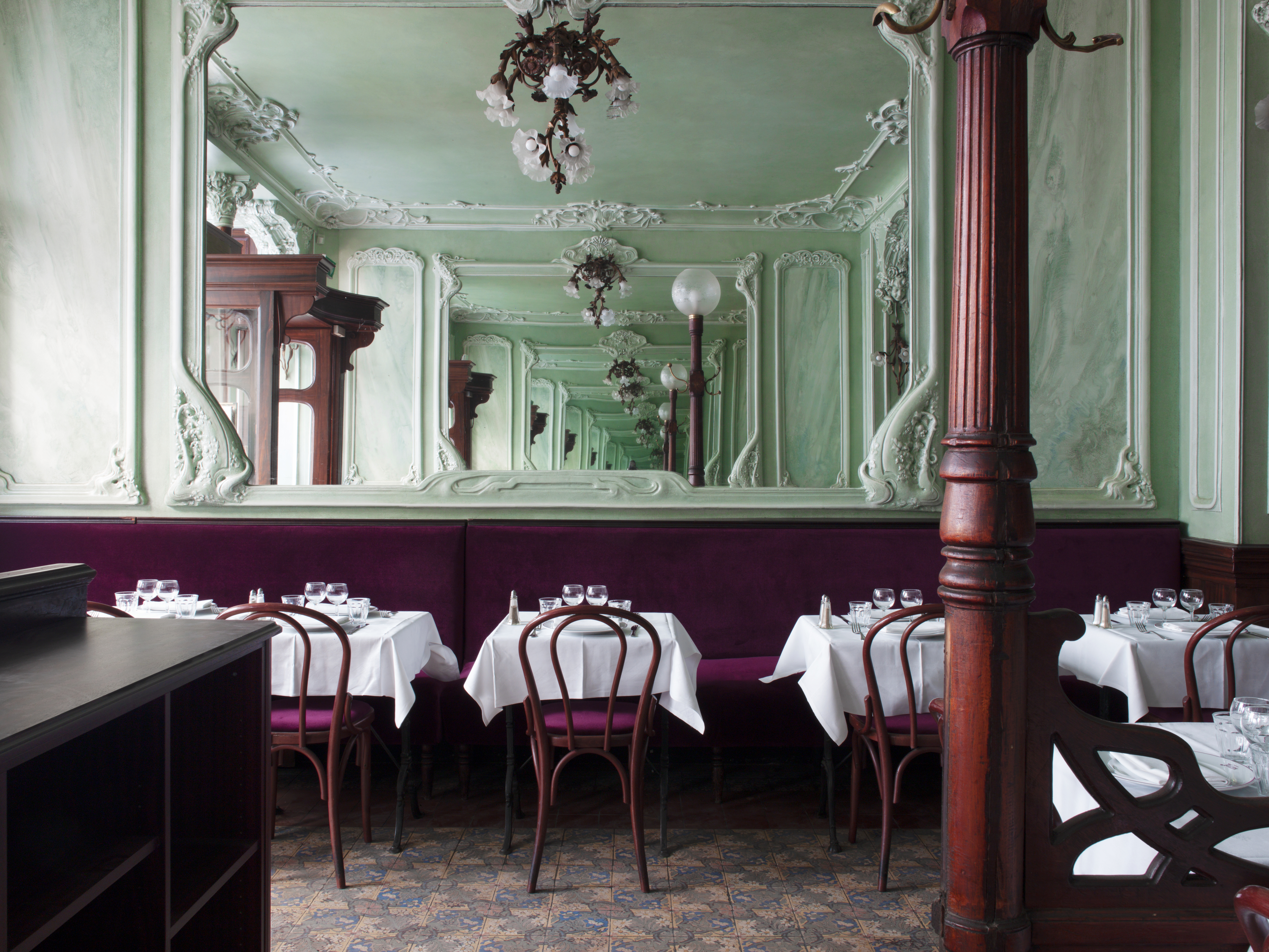

== See also ==
- List of monuments historiques in Paris
- Art Nouveau in Paris
- La Coupole, another Art Deco brasserie in Paris
- Brasserie Julien in New York City
