= Albert Monnier =

French author, poet, biographer and playwright

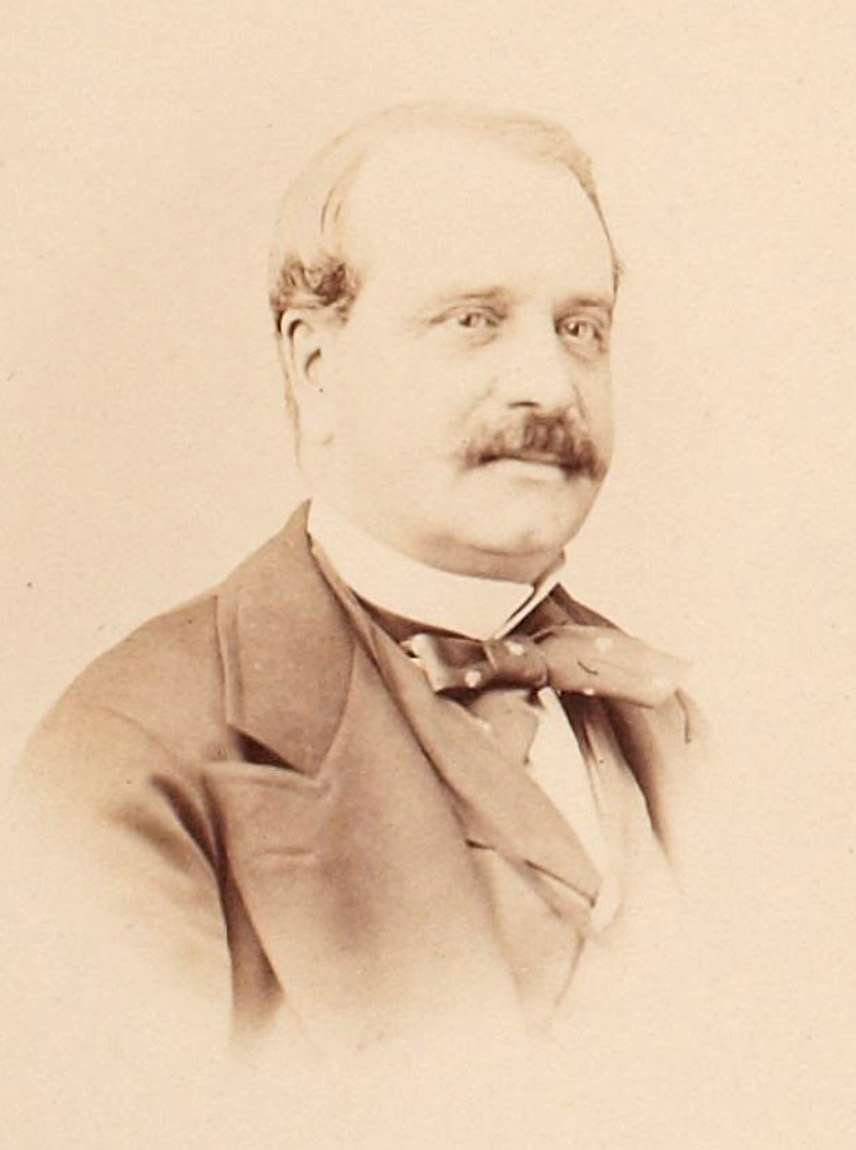
- Born: Albert Monnier; 22 July 1815; Paris, France
- Died: 1 July 1869 (aged 53); Paris, France
- Occupations: Writer; biographer; playwright

Albert Monnier (22 July 1815 – 1 July 1869) was a 19th-century French author, poet, biographer and playwright.

== Works (selection) ==
- Le Dada de Paimboeuf, with Édouard Martin
- Mauricette, vaudeville in one act
- Le bûcher de Sardanapale, vaudeville in one act
- Un Oncle aux carottes, with Édouard Martin
- Coqsigrue poli par amour, vaudeville in one act
- Ce que vivent les roses, comédie-vaudeville in one act
- Turlututu chapeau pointu, féerie with Édouard Martin and Clairville

Biographies :

- Biographie de Charles Deburau fils
- Biographie de Laferrière
- Biographie de Deburau with Charles Deburau
