= La Chapelle station =

Métro station in Paris, France

La Chapelle
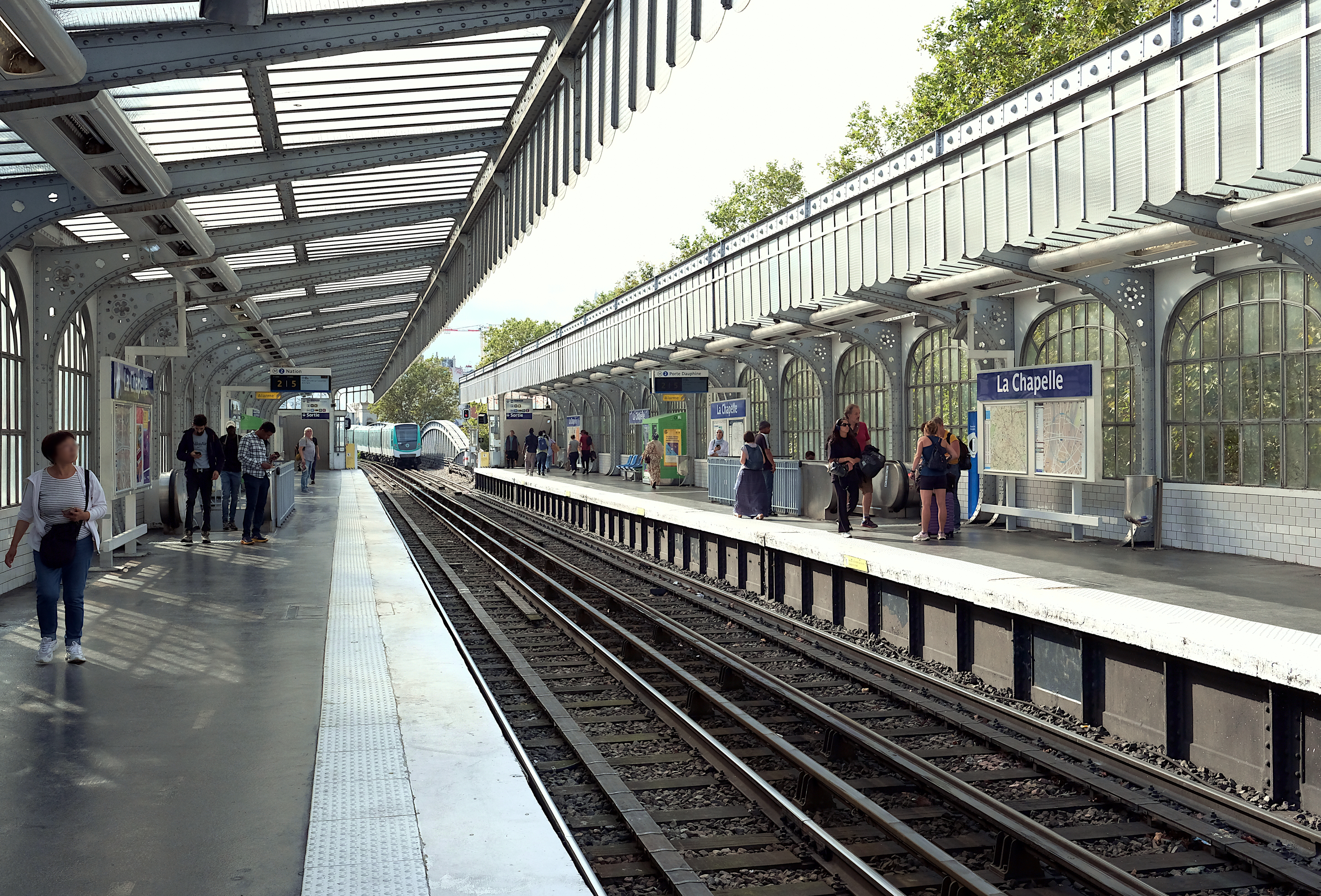
- Platforms, with an MF 01 departing into the distance, September 2024

General information
- Location: Boul. de la Chapelle × Rue du Faubourg-Saint-Denis; 10th and 18th arrondissement of Paris; Île-de-France; France
- Coordinates: 48°53′04″N 2°21′37″E
- Owner: RATP
- Operator: RATP
- Line: Paris Metro Paris Metro Line 2
- Platforms: 2 (side platforms)
- Tracks: 2

Construction
- Accessible: no

Other information
- Fare zone: 1

History
- Opened: 31 January 1903

Services
Preceding station	Paris Metro	Following station
Barbès–Rochechouart towards Porte Dauphine	Line 2	Stalingrad towards Nation
Connections to other stations
Preceding station	Paris Metro	Following station
Gare de l'Est towards Bagneux–Lucie Aubrac	Line 4 transfer at Gare du Nord	Barbès–Rochechouart towards Porte de Clignancourt
Gare de l'Est towards Place d'Italie	Line 5 transfer at Gare du Nord	Stalingrad towards Bobigny–Pablo Picasso
Preceding station	RER	Following station
La Plaine Stade de France towards Aéroport Charles de Gaulle 2 TGV or Mitry–Claye	RER B transfer at Gare du Nord	Châtelet towards Robinson or Saint-Rémy-lès-Chevreuse
Stade de France–Saint-Denis towards Creil	RER D transfer at Gare du Nord	Châtelet towards Corbeil-Essonnes
Stade de France–Saint-Denis towards Goussainville	RER D transfer at Gare du Nord	Châtelet towards Melun
Haussmann–Saint-Lazare towards Nanterre–La Folie	RER E transfer at Magenta	Rosa Parks towards Chelles–Gournay or Tournan
Location
- Location within Paris

La Chapelle (French pronunciation: [la ʃapɛl]; lit. 'The Chapel') is a station on Line 2 of the Paris Métro, on the border of the 10th and 18th arrondissements above the Boulevard de la Chapelle. The station is connected to the Gare du Nord and the Gare du Nord Métro station on Lines 4 and 5.

It should not be confused with Line 12's Porte de la Chapelle station, located further north.

== Location ==
The station is located above the Boulevard de la Chapelle at the intersection with the Rue du Faubourg-Saint-Denis and Rue Marx-Dormoy.

== History ==
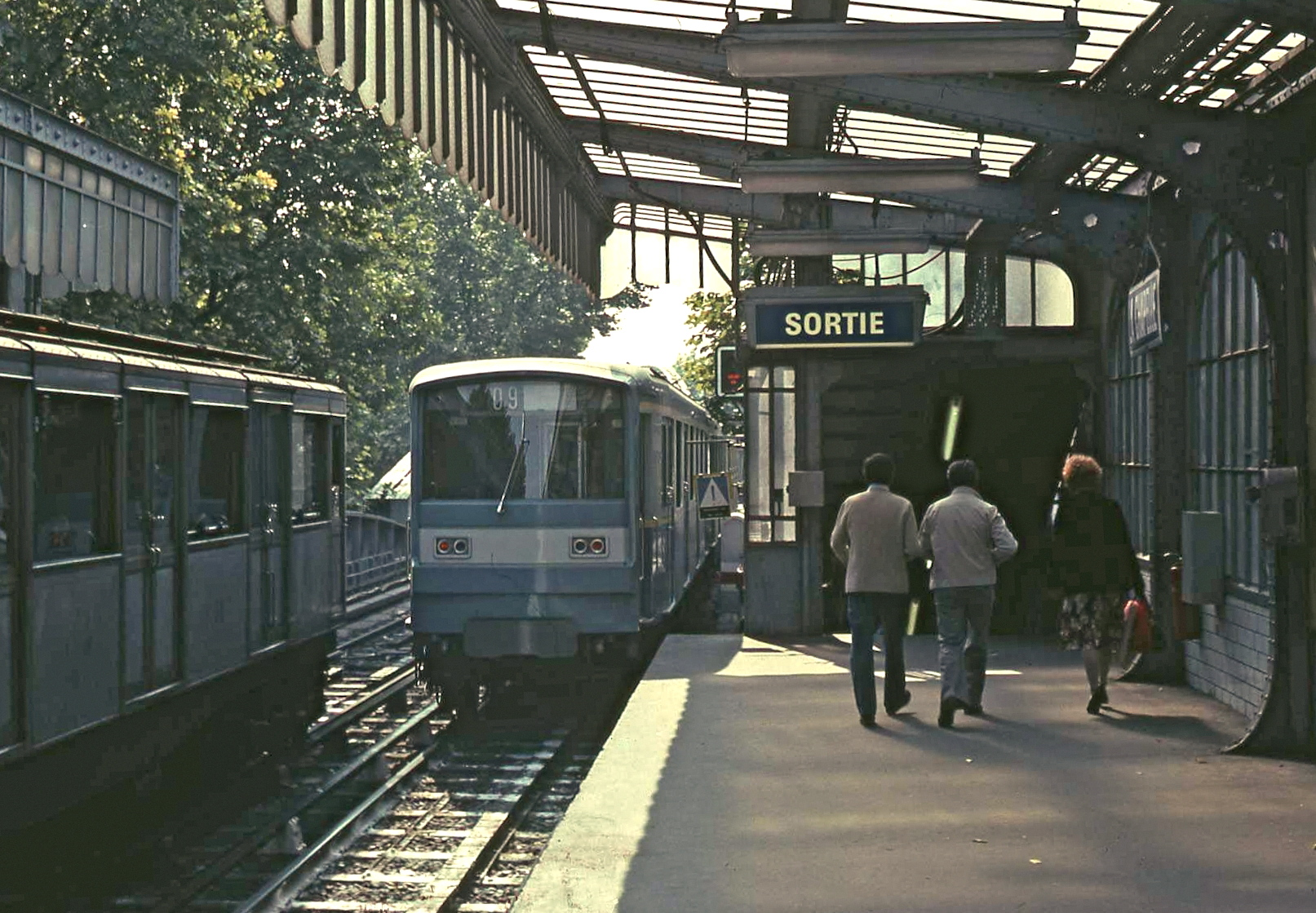
Platform in 1979

The elevated Line 2 station was opened on 31 January 1903 as part of the extension of Line 2 from Anvers to Bagnolet (now called Alexandre Dumas). It is named after the Place de la Chapelle, which was named after the Barrière de la Chapelle, a gate built for the collection of taxation as part of the Wall of the Farmers-General; the gate was built between 1784 and 1788 and demolished after 1859. The gate was named after a village that was annexed by Paris in 1860 and was named after a chapel to Saint Genevieve built in the 6th century.

Since 1993, a long connecting corridor has connected it to the underground part of the Gare du Nord.

During the summer of 2012, the station closed for two and a half months in order to replace the original canopies with identical ones, which protect passengers from the weather.

At the end of 2017, access to the station was known to be congested, the RATP agreed to launch preliminary studies to create a third access.

In 2019, 6,534,340 travelers entered this station which places it at the 48th position of the metro stations for its usage.

=== Project ===
In a study carried out by the l'Atelier Parisien d'Urbanisme (Parisian Urban Planning Workshop) during May 2012, it hypothesized the possibility of an extension of the tram tracks of the T8 line, southwest of Gare Rosa-Parks, towards the Gare de Paris-Est, using the tracks next to the RER E. It would be carried out as part of the redevelopment of an enlarged area of Paris northeast. It would run alongside the ZAC Pajol, serve the La Chapelle metro station on line 2 and therefore end at the Gare de l'Est.

== Passenger services ==
=== Access ===
The station has two entrances to the west end of the station, located on the central reservation of Boulevard de la Chapelle, on either side of the metro viaduct.

There is a connection to Gare du Nord through a tunnel between the metro station and the RER station.

=== Station layout ===
P Platform level	Side platform, doors will open on the right
P Platform level	Platform 1	← toward Porte Dauphine (Barbès – Rochechouart)
P Platform level	Platform 2	toward Nation (Stalingrad) →
P Platform level	Side platform, doors will open on the right

M	Mezzanine for platform connection

G
Street Level

=== Platforms ===
The station platforms, overhead, located on a viaduct, are a standard configuration with two platforms separated by metro tracks. They are fitted with awnings, like all the elevated stations on the line. The lighting is carried out thanks to two unique light canopies of neon lights. The upper walls are made of transparent stained glass (unlike the other elevated stations of the line, which are frosted) surmounting the lower walls that covered with white and flat ceramic tiles. The platforms, devoid of advertising, are fitted with blue Motte style seats and the name of the station is inscribed in Parisine font on enameled plates.

=== Bus connections ===
The station is served by lines 35, 38, 45, 48, 302 and La Traverse Ney-Flandre (519) of the RATP Bus Network and, at night, by line N43 of the Noctilien.

== Nearby ==
The Théâtre des Bouffes du Nord, located on Boulevard de la Chapelle, is opposite the station.

== Gallery ==
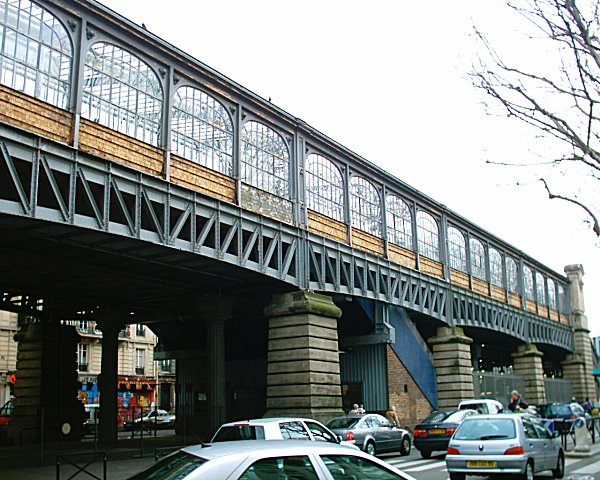
Viaduct exterior at La Chapelle

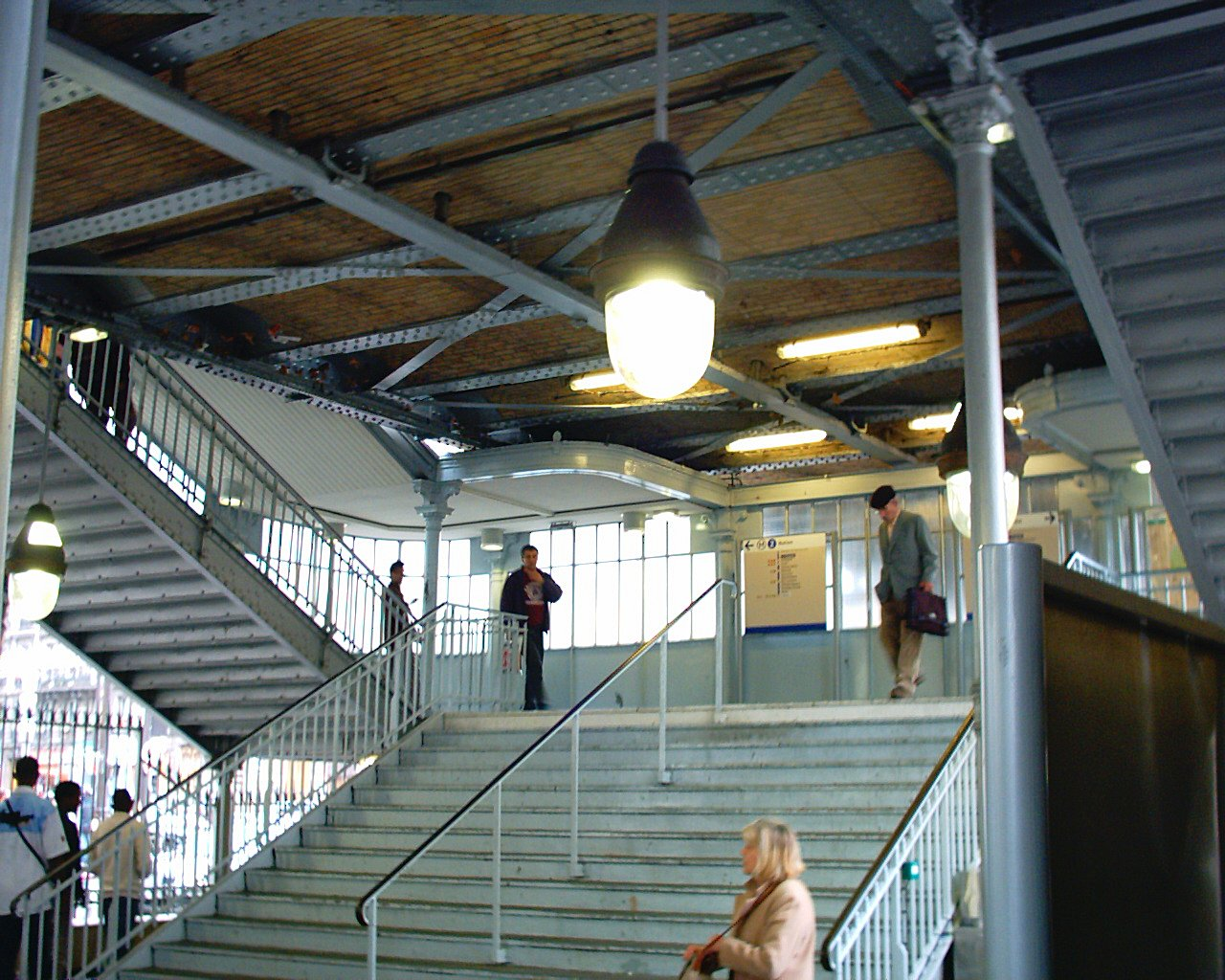
Station entrance

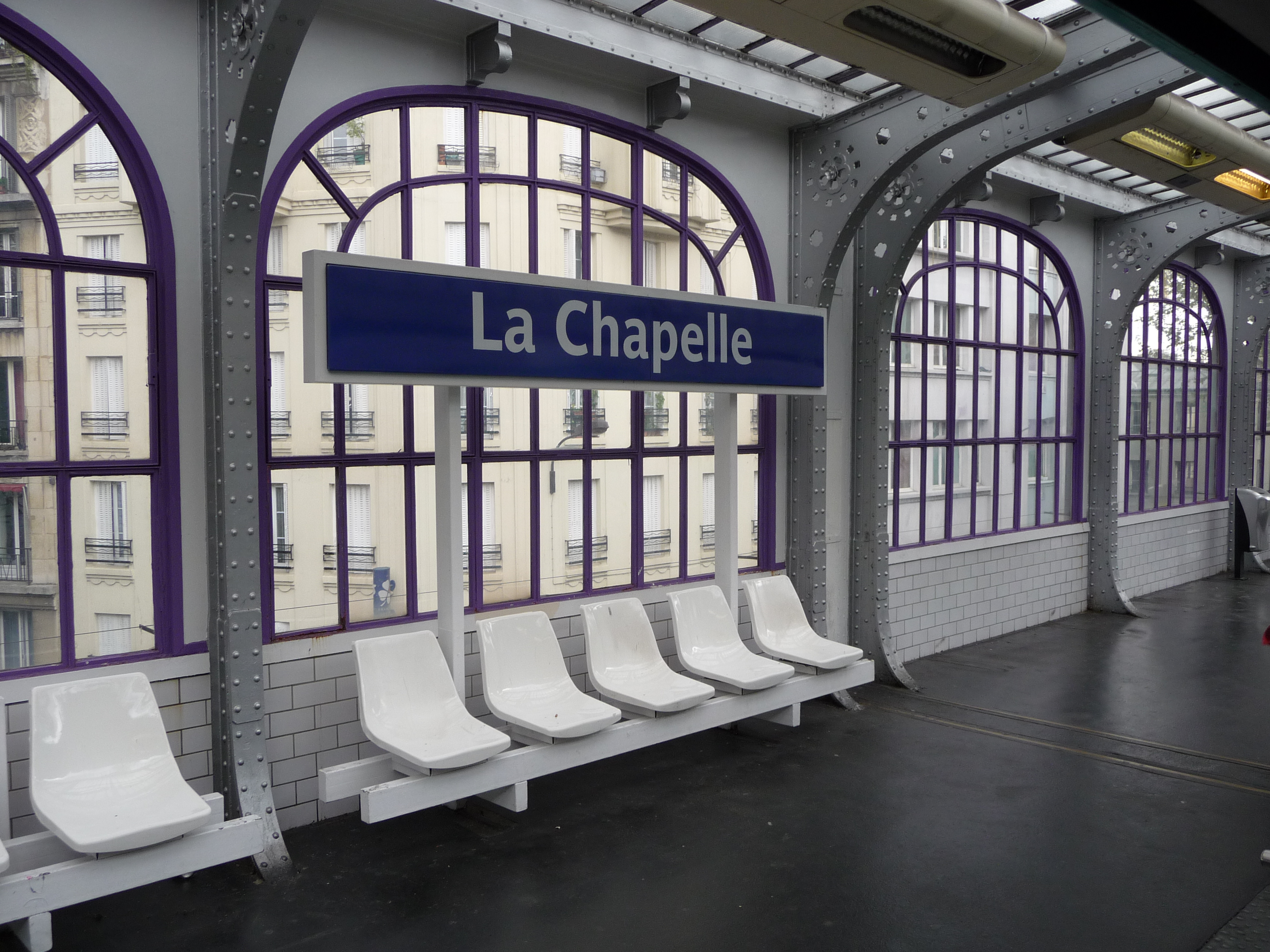
Platform signage

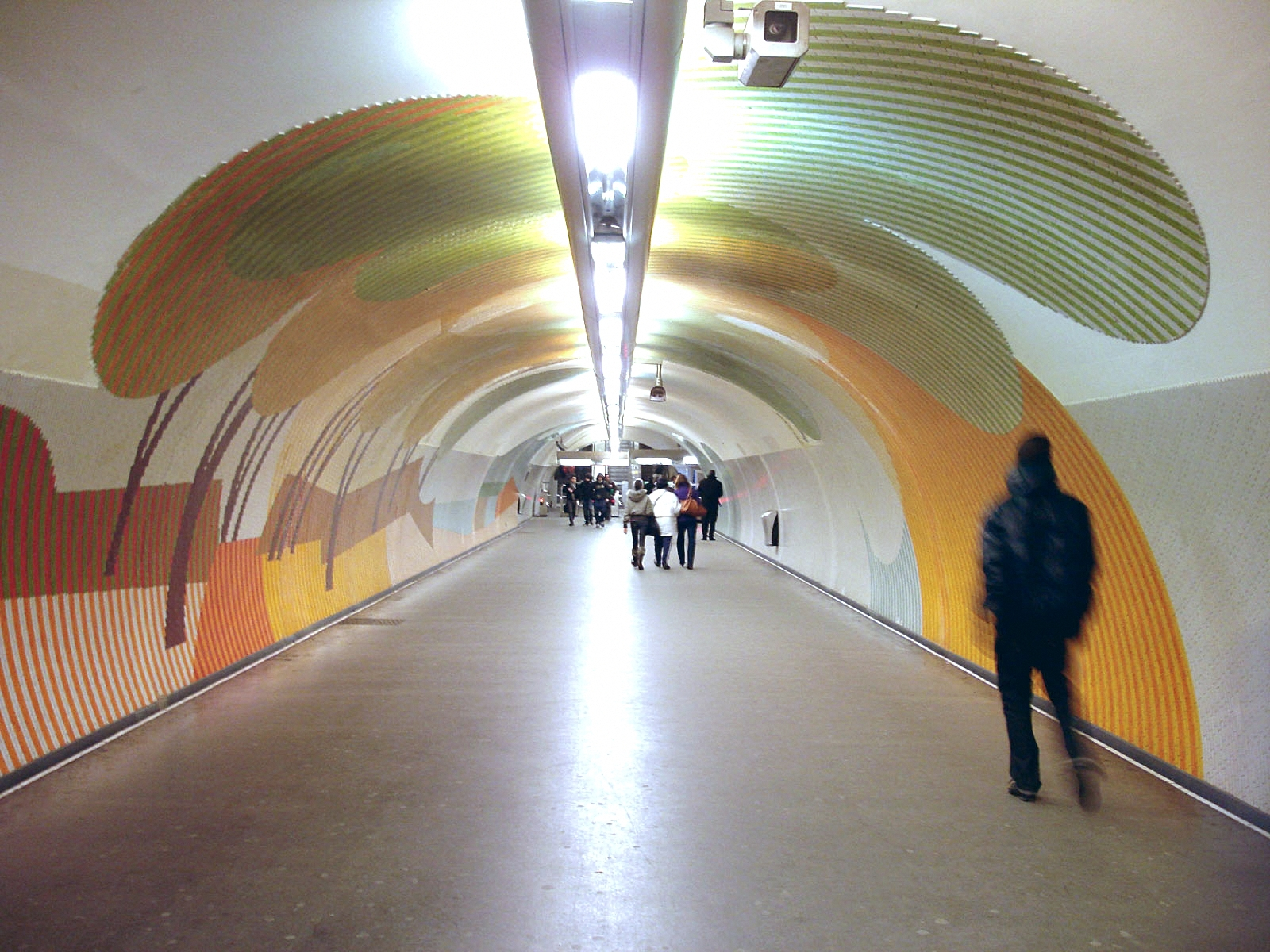
Underground connection to Gare du Nord
