= Quartier de la Porte-Saint-Martin =

Coordinates: 48.8806064°N 2.3689914°E

Porte-Saint-Martin
- Quartier de la Porte-Saint-Martin
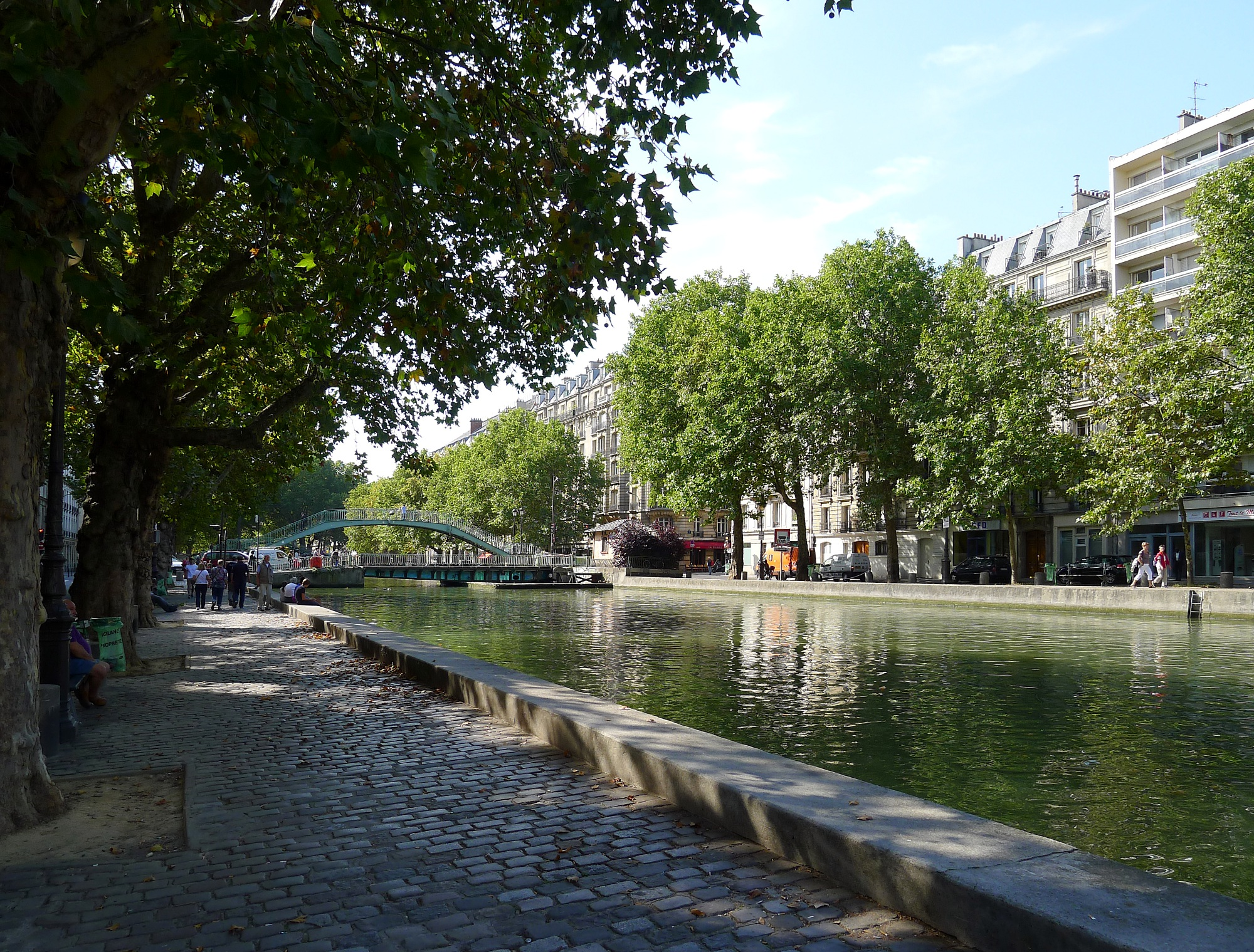
- Canal Saint-Martin
- Interactive map of Porte-Saint-Martin
- Country: France
- Region: Île-de-France
- Ville: Paris
- Arrondissement: 10th

Area
  - Total: 0.609 km^{2} (0.235 sq mi)

Population (2016)
  - Total: 23,071
  - Density: 37,883/km^{2} (98,120/sq mi)

The Quartier de la Porte-Saint-Martin is the 39th of the 80 quarters of Paris, located in the 10th arrondissement.

The Quarters in the 10th arrondissement

== Location ==
The administrative district in the 10th arrondissement of Paris is bounded by the following streets:

- West: Boulevard de Strasbourg
- North and northeast: Place du 11 Novembre 1918, continuing via Rue du Faubourg Saint-Martin to Rue des Récollets and onward to Rue Bichat
- Southeast: Rue du Faubourg du Temple
- South: Boulevard Saint-Martin, extending to Place de la République

== Origin of the name ==
The Porte Saint-Martin forms a "natural" gateway to the neighborhood from the south, which is why it was given this name.

== History ==
In the 18th century, the district was called the Quartier Saint-Martin-des-Champs, owing to its proximity to the Saint-Martin-des-Champs Priory, whose grounds were situated at the edge of Paris, north of the Porte Saint-Martin.

== Sightseeing features ==
- Porte Saint-Martin
- There are many theaters in the district, here are some examples:
  - Le Splendid
  - Théâtre de la Renaissance
  - Le Théâtre libre
  - Théâtre Antoine-Simone Berriau
  - Alhambra
