= Antoine Dubois =

French surgeon (1756–1837)

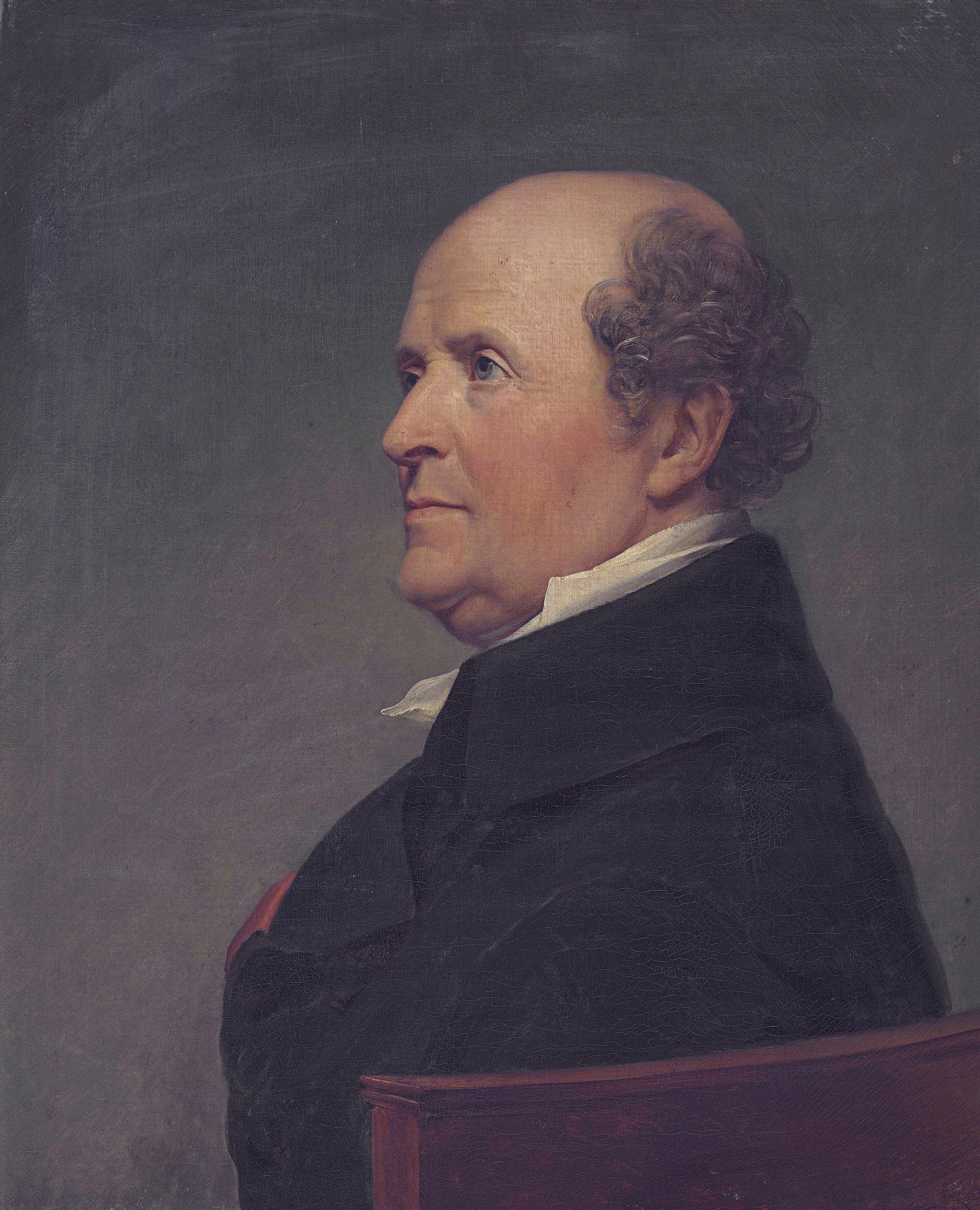
Antoine Dubois, Baron de l'Empire

The personal coat of arms of the baron Antoine Dubois

Baron Antoine Dubois (19 June 1756 – 30 March 1837) was a French surgeon born in Gramat, department of Lot. As the consultant-surgeon, and head of maternity services to Napoleon and his wife the Empress Marie Louise of Austria, Dubois delivered their son and successor to the throne, Napoleon II. In 1798, he served as chief surgeon to the French Campaign of Egypt, He was the father of obstetrician Paul Antoine Dubois (1795–1871).

Dubois was appointed a professor of surgery in 1790. On 22 August 1798 he became a member of the Institut d'Égypte.

In 1802 he became a surgeon in a private hospital that later was to become known as the Maison Dubois. After the death of Pierre Lassus (1741–1807), Dubois was appointed as consultant-surgeon of the Emperor, and in 1810 replaced Jean-Louis Baudelocque (1745–1810) as head of maternity services. Following the birth of Napoleon II, he was given the title of "Baron of the Empire".

In 1820 Dubois was appointed as a clinical professor to the Faculté de Médecine. He was relieved of these duties in 1822, only to have them reinstated several years later (1829). He published little during his career, but is credited with making improvement to a number of surgical instruments, including a forceps.
