= Hôpital Fernand-Widal =

Paris hospital founded as Maison Dubois

- Assistance publique - Hôpitaux de Paris
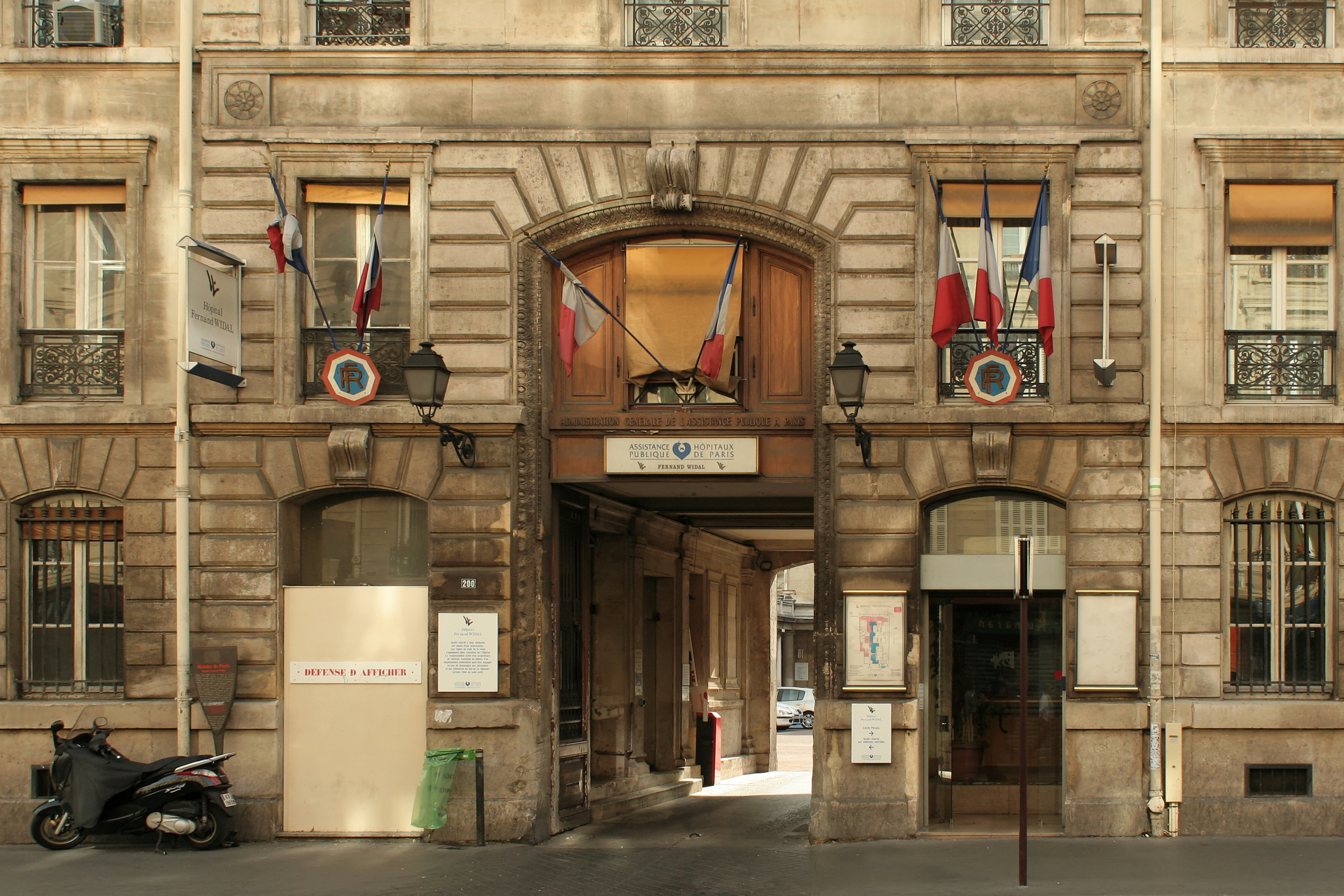
- Entrance of the Hôpital Fernand-Widal

Geography
- Location: 10th arrondissement, Paris, France
- Coordinates: 48°52′54″N 2°21′35″E

Organisation
- Affiliated university: Université Paris Cité

History
- Opened: 1858

Links
- Website: hopital-lariboisiere.aphp.fr
- Lists: Hospitals in France

The Hôpital Fernand-Widal (English: Fernand-Widal Hospital) is an establishment of the Assistance Publique–Hôpitaux de Paris (AP-HP) located at 200, rue du Faubourg-Saint-Denis in the 10th arrondissement of Paris. A public teaching hospital, Fernand-Widal has medicine, surgery, and obstetric departments and treats a large number of indigent patients including those with drug addictions. The building is a landmark of Rue du Faubourg-Saint-Denis, and was known until 1959 as Maison Dubois, after surgeon Antoine Dubois. At the turn of the century, Maison Dubois had 450 beds and was also known as the "municipal hospital for the insane" or Maison Municipal de Santé. The hospital now bears the name of doctor Georges-Fernand Widal, author of works on typhoid and kidney diseases.

Fernald-Widal Hospital is Paris' primary poison control center, and the hospital is host to an internationally renowned toxicology department. The hospital's expertise in the area of drug overdoses has resulted in them treating celebrity or criminal patients, including pop star Dalida in 1967 and art dealer Fernand Legros (charged with dealing in forgeries). Research published in 1991 by doctors at the hospital found that many house-fire survivors may be subsequently poisoned by cyanide released by burning household fabrics. The hospital's toxicologists are regarded as the world's experts in the management of cases involving the typically fatal ingestion of poisonous Amanita phalloides "death cap" mushrooms. The department came to prominence under the leadership of Michel Gaultier, who trained as a forensic pathologist and became head of internal medicine at Fernand-Widal in the 1950s.

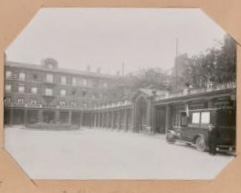
Ambulance entrance of Maison Dubois, circa 1920

Hôpital Fernand-Widal is served by the La Chapelle and Gare du Nord metro stations.

It is affiliated to Université Paris Cité.
