= Boulevard de la Chapelle =

Boulevard of Paris, France

Coordinates: 48°53′4″N 2°21′35″E

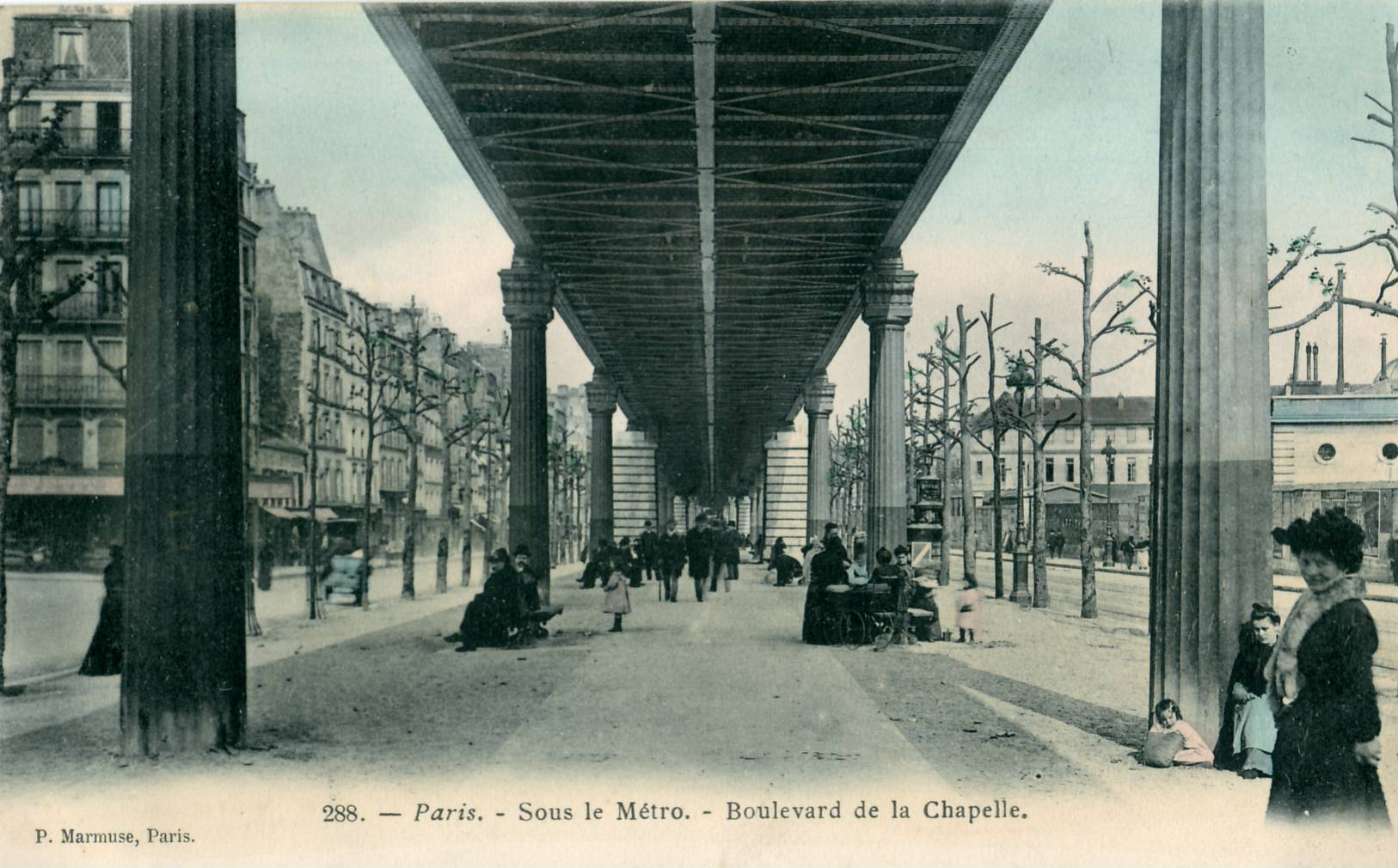
The viaduct of Paris Métro Line 2 was built along the line of the boulevard in 1903

The Boulevard de la Chapelle (French pronunciation: [bulvaʁ də la ʃapɛl]) marks the border between the 10th and 18th arrondissement of Paris. It corresponds in part to the mur des Fermiers généraux, which, until 1860, marked the border between the communes of Paris and La Chapelle, a commune in its own right on the outskirts of the city.

The street is served by the Paris Metro station La Chapelle. At number 37 is the Théâtre des Bouffes du Nord.
