= Montfermeil =

- Commune
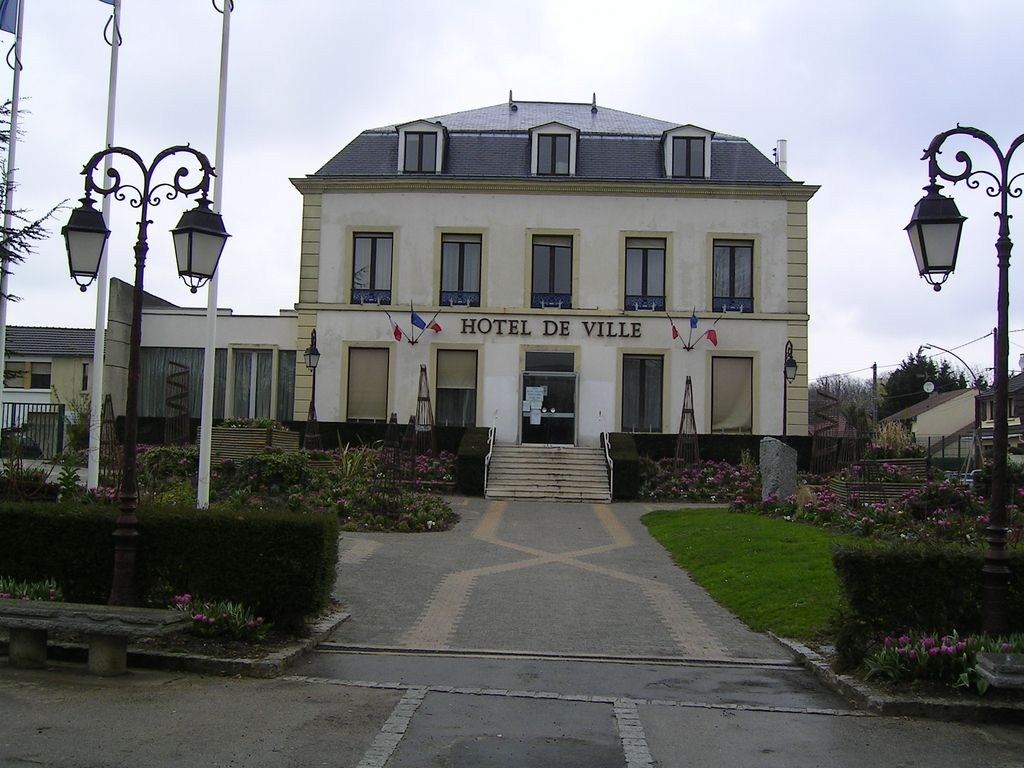
- The Hôtel de Ville

- Coat of arms

- Location (in red) within Paris inner suburbs
- Location of Montfermeil
- Location within France Location within Île-de-France (region)
- Coordinates: 48°54′00″N 2°34′00″E
- Country: France
- Region: Île-de-France
- Department: Seine-Saint-Denis
- Arrondissement: Le Raincy
- Canton: Tremblay-en-France
- Intercommunality: Grand Paris

Government
  - Mayor (2026–32): Xavier Lemoine
- Area^{1}: 5.45 km^{2} (2.10 sq mi)
- Elevation: 116 m (381 ft)
- Population (2023): 28,703
  - Density: 5,270/km^{2} (13,600/sq mi)
- Time zone: UTC+01:00 (CET)
  - Summer (DST): UTC+02:00 (CEST)
- INSEE/Postal code: 93047 /93370
- ^{1} French Land Register data, which excludes lakes, ponds, glaciers > 1 km^{2} (0.386 sq mi or 247 acres) and river estuaries.

Montfermeil (French pronunciation: [mɔ̃fɛʁmɛj]) is a commune in the eastern suburbs of Paris, France. It is located 17.2 km (10.7 mi) from the center of Paris.

Montfermeil is famous as the location of Thénardiers' inn in Les Misérables. It has made the headlines due to troubles in its social estate called "les Bosquets".

== History ==
The name Montfermeil possibly derives from the Latin montem firmaculum, meaning 'closed mountain'. However, it may derive from the Latin mons ferre meaning 'burnt mountain'.

The Hôtel de Ville was completed in 1853.

== Population ==
Historical population

Year	Pop.	±% p.a.
1793	721	—
1800	836	+2.14%
1806	857	+0.41%
1821	768	−0.73%
1831	1,064	+3.31%
1836	905	−3.19%
1841	952	+1.02%
1846	1,025	+1.49%
1851	982	−0.85%
1856	950	−0.66%
1861	1,124	+3.42%
1866	1,140	+0.28%
1872	1,003	−2.11%
1876	997	−0.15%
1881	1,010	+0.26%
1886	1,229	+4.00%
1891	1,241	+0.19%
1896	1,188	−0.87%
1901	1,606	+6.21%

Year	Pop.	±% p.a.
1906	2,009	+4.58%
1911	2,069	+0.59%
1921	2,619	+2.39%
1926	4,059	+9.16%
1931	5,536	+6.40%
1936	6,196	+2.28%
1946	5,660	−0.90%
1954	8,271	+4.86%
1962	12,019	+4.78%
1968	21,063	+9.80%
1975	23,237	+1.41%
1982	22,926	−0.19%
1990	25,556	+1.37%
1999	24,121	−0.64%
2007	25,824	+0.86%
2012	26,051	+0.18%
2017	26,783	+0.56%
2023	28,703	+1.16%

Source: EHESS and INSEE (1968-2023)

== Heraldry ==
arms of Montfermeil	The arms of Montfermeil are blazoned : Gules, 3 roses argent.

== Points of interest ==
- Parc Arboretum de Montfermeil
- Sempin Windmill

== Economy ==
Montfermeil at one time had the head office of Titus Software.

== Transport ==
Montfermeil is served by two stations of the Paris Métro, RER, or suburban rail network. The closest stations are Le Raincy–Villemomble–Montfermeil station and Le Chénay-Gagny.

== Education ==
Schools in Montfermeil:

- Seven combined preschools and elementary schools: L'Arc en Ciel, Paul Eluard, Jules Ferry, Danielle Casanova, Victor Hugo, Jean-Baptiste Clement, and Joliot Curie
- Junior high schools: Jean Jaures and Pablo Picasso

== Notable people ==
- Emre Akbaba, footballer
- Samba Diakité, footballer
- Metehan Güçlü, footballer
- Ladj Ly, filmmaker
- Aïssa Laïdouni, footballer
- Larrys Mabiala, footballer
- Christopher Maboulou, footballer
- Kamulete Makiese, footballer
- Orphee Neola, athlete
- Kevynn Nyokas, handball player
- Olivier Nyokas, handball player
- Henri Pescarolo, racing driver
- Listner Pierre-Louis, footballer
- Johny Placide, footballer
- Christian Potel, former professional footballer
- Mamadou Samassa, footballer
- Joel Sami, footballer

== See also ==
- Communes of the Seine-Saint-Denis department
