= Transdev TRA =

French bus company

TRA bus network
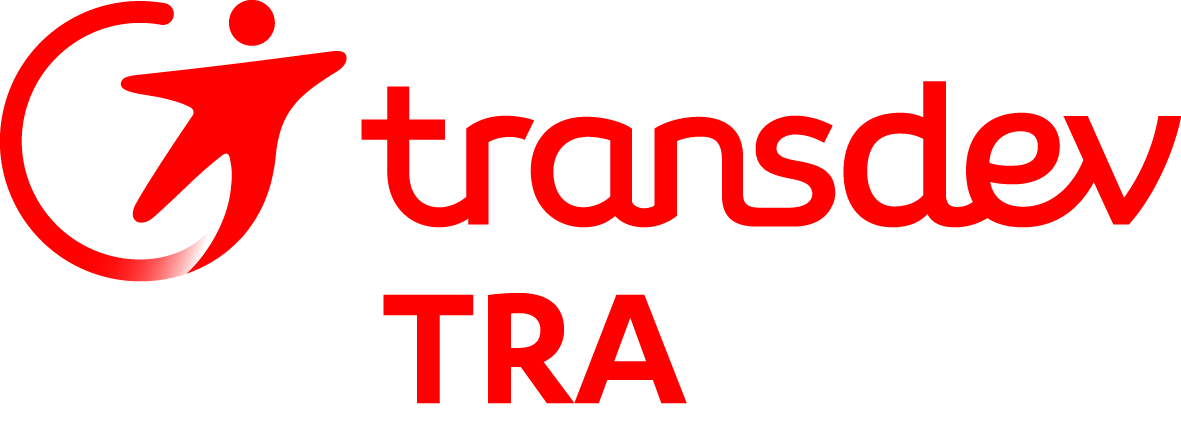
- Commenced operation: 1983
- Headquarters: 3 allée de Grenelle, 92130 Issy-les-Moulineaux France
- Service area: Île-de-France (Seine-Saint-Denis)
- Routes: 22
- Operator: Transports Rapides Automobiles (Transdev)
- Website: https://www.transdev-idf.com/r%C3%A9seau-bus-tra/293

The TRA bus network covers the Seine-Saint-Denis department in the Île-de-France region. It is operated by Transports Rapides Automobiles, which is owned by Transdev and is a member of Optile (Organisation Professionnelle des Transports d'Île-de-France).

A 6-month trial of on-demand bus services was carried out from March to August 2018 by Île-de-France Mobilités (IDFM) in the outer suburbs. The service, which operated from 2200 at night, enabled passengers to alight between 2 bus stops, reducing the need to walk to their intended destination as well as to combat gender-based harassment in public transportation. A total of 11 routes were involved, consisting of the Mélibus network in Seine-et-Marne (7 routes) and the TRA network (4 routes: 602, 607, 618 and 620) in Seine-Saint-Denis. Due to its positive feedback, IDFM had authorised Transdev to extend the trial to 50 other routes in Île-de-France in 2019.

== Network ==
TRA operates 22 numbered routes from 602 to 644 mainly in the department of Seine-Saint-Denis, and to a smaller extent, Seine-et-Marne. 4 routes are designated as Mobilien routes, 602, 609, 613, and 615. These routes have a higher frequency as well as longer operating hours to serve the dense urban areas of Île-de-France to provide an alternative to cars in the suburbs.

| Route | Between | And |
|---|---|---|
| 602 | Le Raincy - Gare du Raincy Villemomble Montfermeil | Coubron - Corot |
| 603 | Le Raincy-Gare du Raincy Villemomble Montfermeil | Coubron - Corot |
| 604 | Gagny - Gare de Gagny | Montfermeil - Hôpital de Montfermeil T4 |
| 605 | Aulnay-sous-Bois - Gare d'Aulnay-sous-Bois | Le Raincy - Gare du Raincy Villemomble Montfermeil |
| 607 | Villepinte - Gare de Villepinte | La Courneuve - La Courneuve–8 mai 1945 |
| 609 | Villepinte - Gare de Villepinte | La Courneuve - La Courneuve–8 mai 1945 |
| 610 | Sevran - Gare de Sevran Beaudottes | Dugny - Gare de Dugny la Courneuve |
| 611 | La Courneuve - La Courneuve 8 mai 1945 | Drancy - Cité Gagarine |
| 613 | Aulnay-sous-Bois - Gare d'Aulnay-sous-Bois | Chelles - Gare de Chelles Gournay |
| 615 | Villepinte - Gare de Villepinte | Bobigny - Bobigny-Pablo Picasso |
| 617 | Aulnay-sous-Bois - Gare d'Aulnay-sous-Bois | Villepinte - Gare de Villepinte |
| 618 | Aulnay-sous-Bois - Gare d'Aulnay-sous-Bois | Sevran - Général de Gaulle |
| 619 | Villepinte - Gare du Vert Galant | Tremblay-en-France - Centre Postal |
| 620 | Bobigny - Bobigny Pablo Picasso | Le Blanc-Mesnil - Pont-Yblon |
| 623 | Gagny - Gare de Gagny | Sevran - Gare de Sevran-Livry Sud |
| 627 | Aulnay-sous-Bois - Gare d'Aulnay-sous-Bois | Aulnay-sous-Bois - Garonor |
| 637 | Aulnay-sous-Bois - Gare d'Aulnay-sous-Bois | Aulnay-sous-Bois - Gare d'Aulnay-sous-Bois |
| 640 | Villepinte - Gare du Parc des Expositions | Villepinte - Gare du Parc des Expositions |
| 642 | Villepinte - Gare de Villepinte | Tremblay-en-France - Gare du Vert Galant |
| 643 | Villepinte - Gare du Vert Galant | Neuilly-sur-Marne - Château d'Eau |
| 644 | Livry-Gargan - Gutenberg/Lycée Boulloche | Vaujours - Collège Henri IV |

== Gallery ==
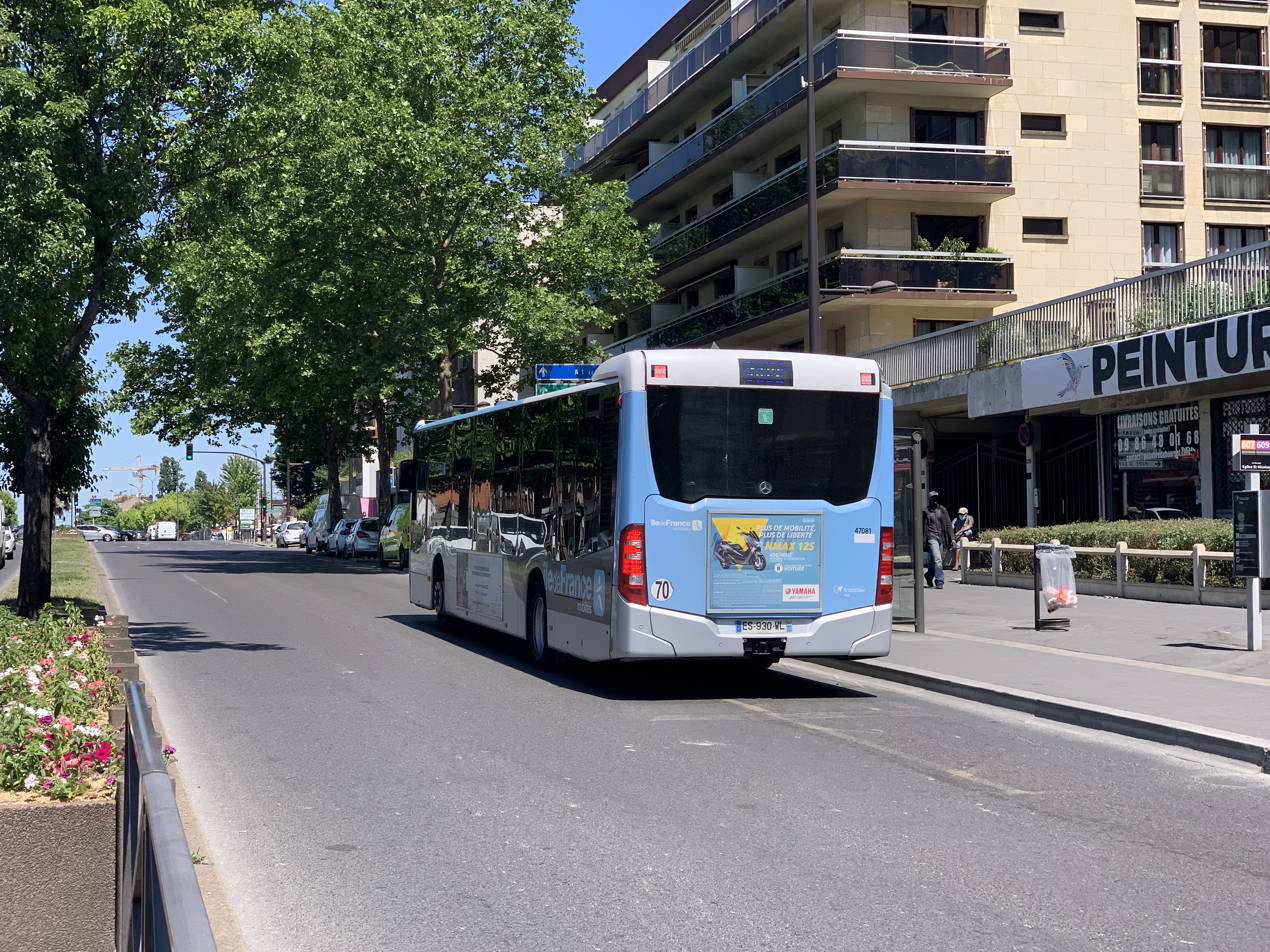
Bus on route 609 in the new blue IDFM livery

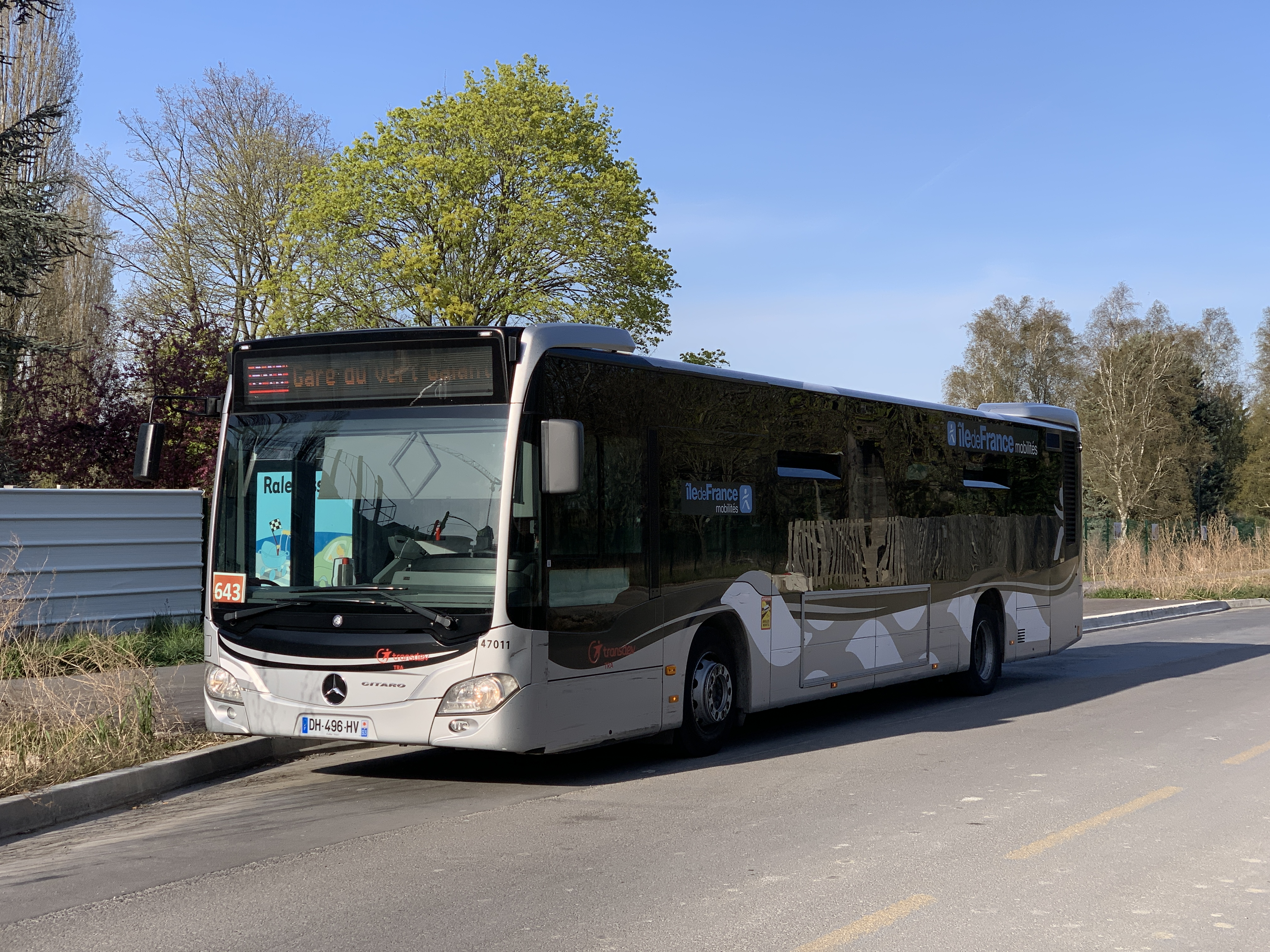
Bus on route 643

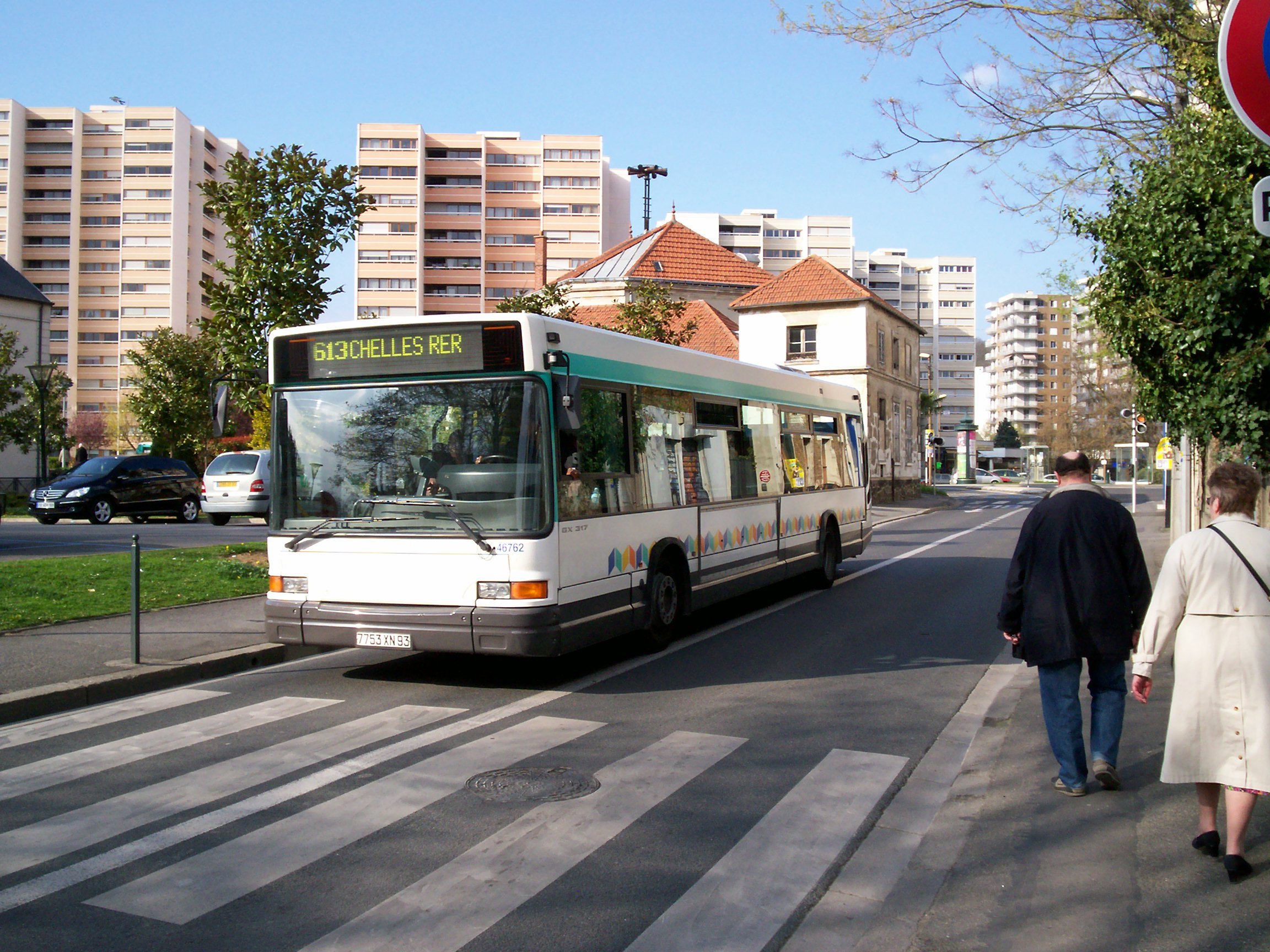
Bus on route 613 in the old TRA livery (2009)
