= Potel (surname) =

Potel is a surname. Notable people with the surname include:

- Christian Potel (born 1973), French football player
- Victor Potel (1889–1947), American character actor

== See also ==
- Patel
