= Châlons-en-Champagne station =

Railway station in Châlons-en-Champagne, France

Coordinates: 48°57′20″N 4°20′56″E

Châlons-en-Champagne
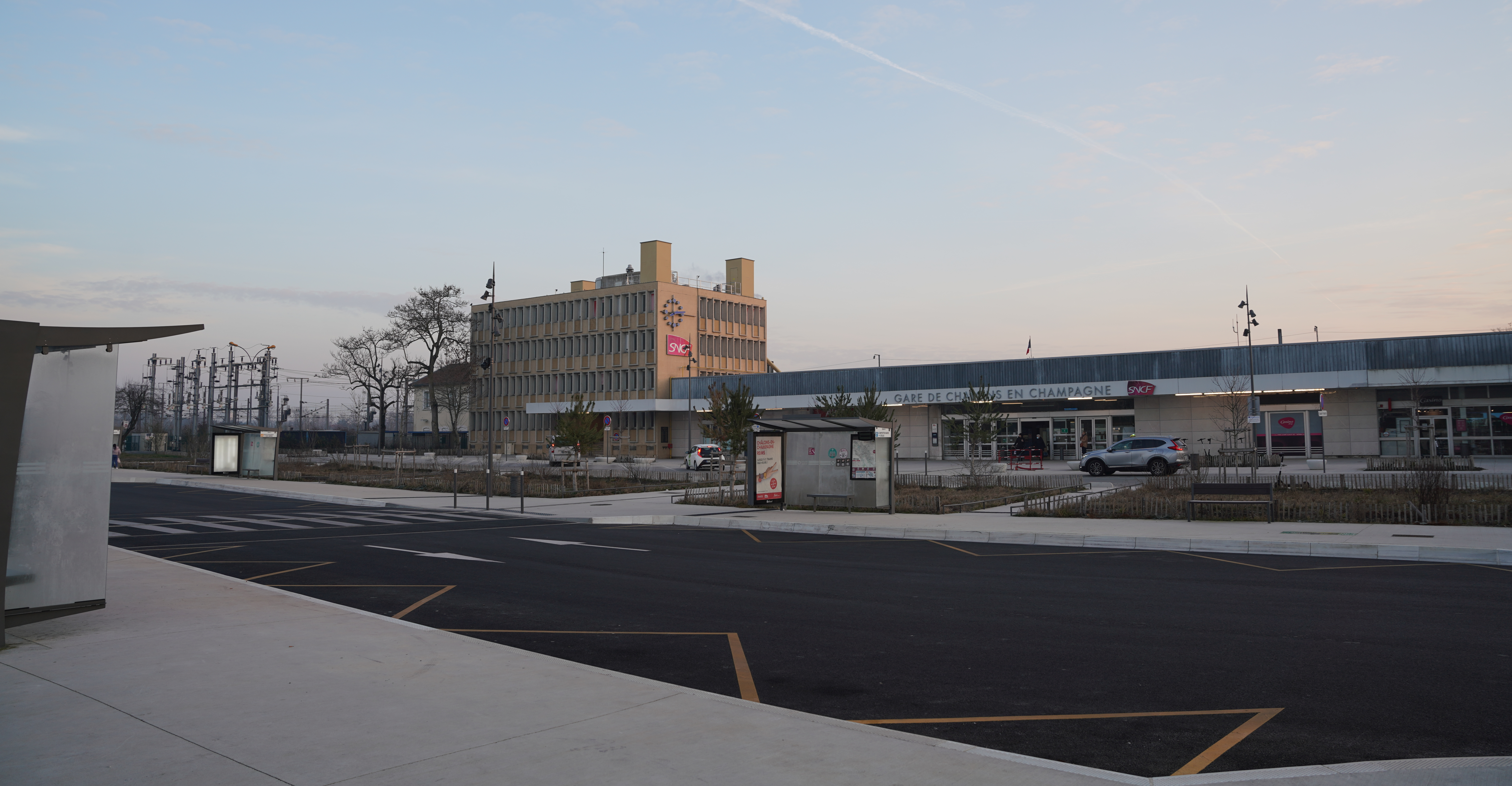

General information
- Location: Place de la Gare; 51000 Châlons-en-Champagne; Marne, France
- Elevation: 83 m (272 ft)
- Owner: SNCF
- Operator: SNCF
- Lines: Paris–Strasbourg railway Châlons-en-Champagne–Reims-Cérès railway
- Distance: 172.214 km
- Platforms: 3
- Tracks: 5

Other information
- Station code: 87174003

History
- Opened: 6 November 1849

Passengers
- 2024: 1,077,839

Services
Preceding station	SNCF	Following station
Champagne-Ardenne TGV towards Paris-Est	TGV inOui	Vitry-le-François towards Bar-le-Duc
Preceding station	TER Grand Est	Following station
Épernay towards Paris-Est	C02	Vitry-le-François towards Strasbourg or Saint-Dizier
Mourmelon-le-Petit towards Reims	C06	Vitry-le-François towards Dijon
Épernay Terminus	L28	Vitry-le-François towards Metz
Location

Châlons-en-Champagne station (French: Gare de Châlons-en-Champagne) is a railway station serving the commune of Châlons-en-Champagne, Marne department, eastern France. It is situated at kilometric point (KP) 172.214 on the Paris–Strasbourg railway. The station is served by regional trains towards Paris, Reims, Nancy and Chaumont.

== History ==
The railway section between Épernay and Châlons was inaugurated on 6 November 1849 by General Louis Eugène Cavaignac. The link between Châlons and Paris would turn into daily service four days later. The Paris–Strasbourg railway was subsequently inaugurated by Napoléon III on 17 July 1852.

In 2018, the SNCF estimated that the annual circulation through the station consisted of 717,835 passengers.

== See also ==
- List of SNCF stations in Grand Est
