= Le Chénay-Gagny station =

Railway station in Gagny, France

Le Chénay-Gagny
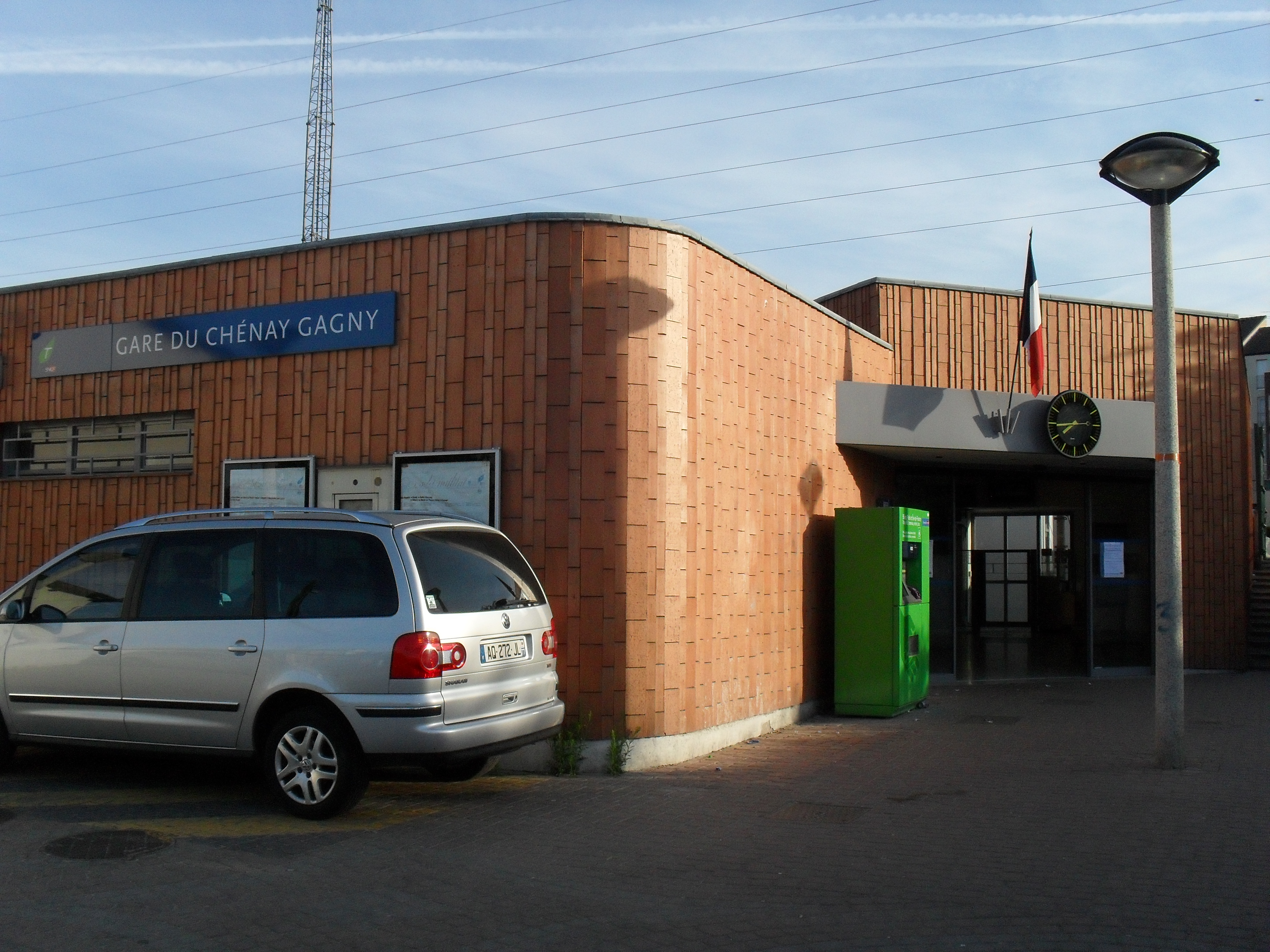

General information
- Location: Rue du Chemin de Fer; Gagny; France
- Coordinates: 48°52′38″N 2°33′10″E
- Elevation: 58 m (190 ft)
- Operator: SNCF
- Line: Paris-Est–Strasbourg-Ville railway
- Platforms: 2
- Tracks: 4
- Bus routes: Transdev TRA: 643; Les Autobus du Fort: 701; : 214, 221; : N23
- Bus operators: RATP, Noctilien, Transdev TRA, Les Autobus du Fort

Construction
- Accessible: Yes, by prior reservation

Other information
- Station code: 87113522
- Fare zone: 4

History
- Opened: 20 April 1935; 91 years ago

Passengers
- 2024: 3,260,598

Services
| Preceding station | RER | Following station |
|---|---|---|
| Gagny towards Nanterre–La Folie | RER E | Chelles–Gournay Terminus |
Location

Le Chénay-Gagny is a railway station in Gagny, Seine-Saint-Denis, France.

== History ==
The station is named after a former holder of the estate, Canus or Kanus, then Chenay, Chesnay and finally Chénay. It has two exits: "Cité Jean Bouin" and "Poste du Chénay-Gagny". The district where the station is located now bears the same name.

== Service ==
The station is located at kilometric point 16.115 on the Paris-Est–Strasbourg-Ville railway. It has been served since 1999 by RER E trains running on branch E2, between Haussmann–Saint-Lazare and Chelles–Gournay. It is served in both directions by four to eight trains per hour.

== Traffic ==
In 2005 there were more than 4,600 passenger entries per day.

== Connections ==
The station is served by

- RATP Group bus line 214
- TRA bus line 642
- Les Autobus du Fort bus line 701
- Noctilien night bus line N23
