= Gagny station =

Railway station in Gagny, France

Gagny
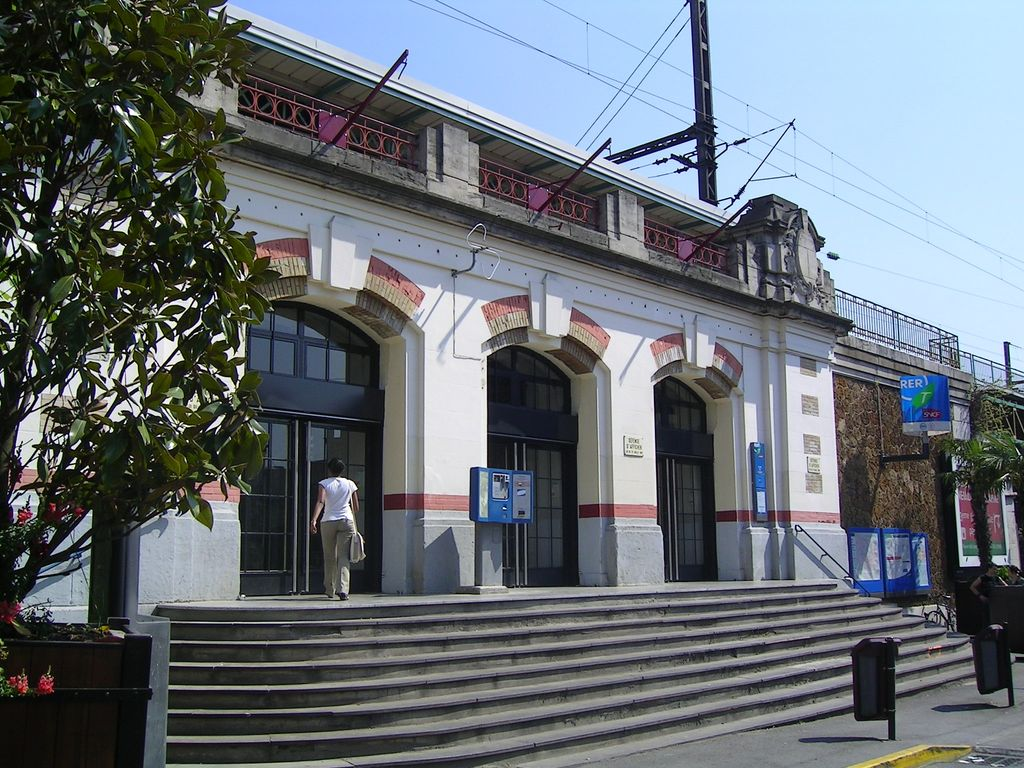
- Gagny station entrance

General information
- Location: Place de Verdun; Gagny; France
- Coordinates: 48°53′02″N 2°31′29″E
- Operator: SNCF
- Line: Paris-Est–Strasbourg-Ville railway
- Platforms: 2
- Tracks: 4
- Connections: RATP Bus: 121 221 303; TRA: 604, 623; Noctilien: N23

Construction
- Parking: 106 spaces
- Accessible: Yes, by prior reservation

Other information
- Station code: 87113514
- Fare zone: 4

History
- Opened: 5 July 1849

Passengers
- 2024: 6,224,800

Services
Preceding station	RER	Following station
Le Raincy–Villemomble–Montfermeil towards Nanterre–La Folie	RER E	Le Chénay-Gagny towards Chelles–Gournay
Location

Gagny station is an RER station in Gagny and near of Villemomble in north suburb of Paris, in Seine-Saint-Denis department, France It is situated on the RER E suburban railway line.
