= Vitry-le-François station =

Railway station in Vitry-le-François, France

Vitry-le-François
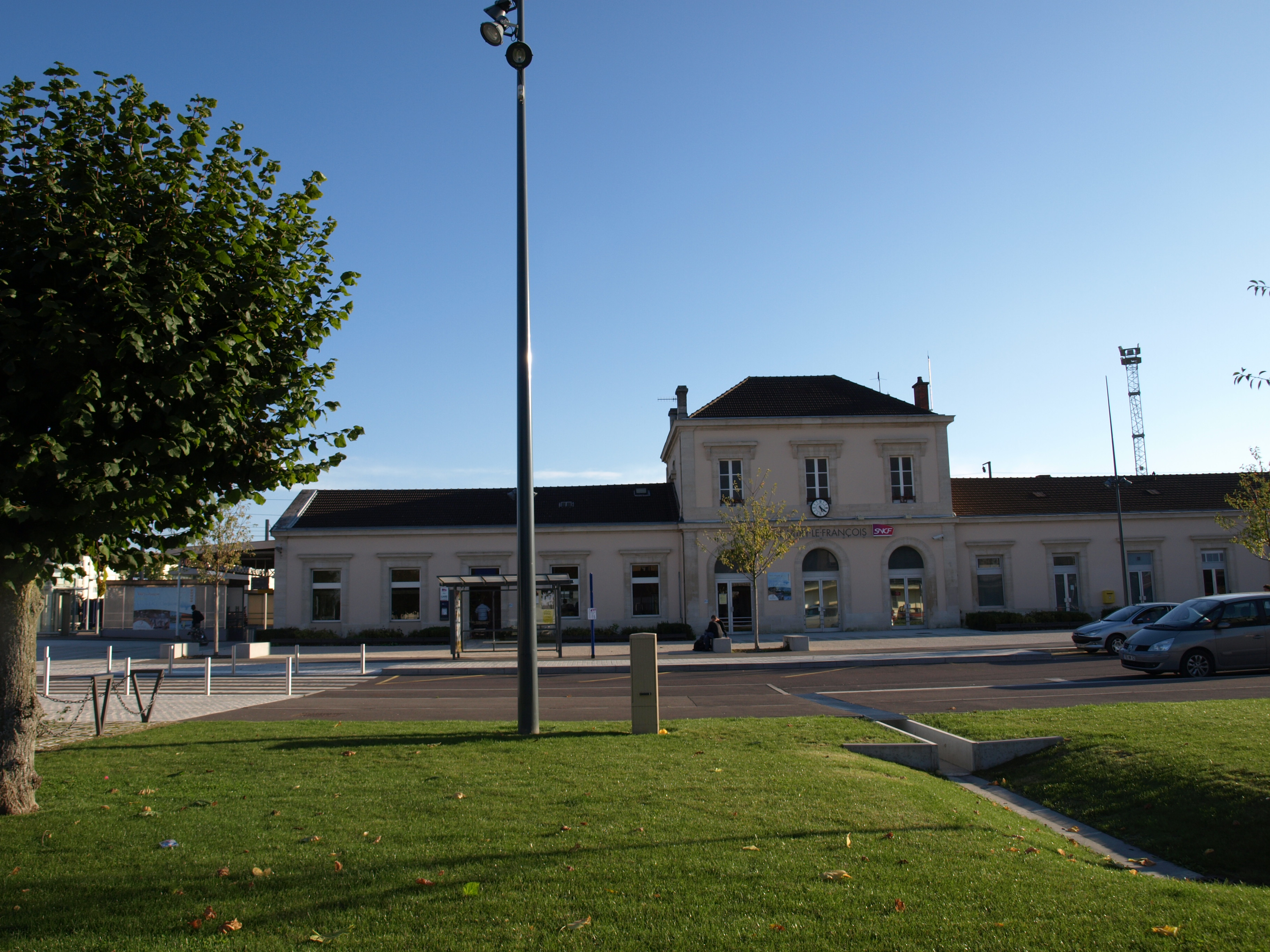

General information
- Location: Place de la gare 51300 Vitry-le-François; Marne, France
- Coordinates: 48°43′04″N 4°35′15″E
- Owner: SNCF
- Operator: SNCF
- Platforms: 2
- Tracks: 3

Other information
- Station code: 87174276

Passengers
- 2016: 211 555

Services
Preceding station	SNCF	Following station
Châlons-en-Champagne towards Paris-Est	TGV inOui	Bar-le-Duc Terminus
Preceding station	TER Grand Est	Following station
Châlons-en-Champagne towards Paris-Est	C02	Saint-Dizier Terminus
Châlons-en-Champagne towards Paris-Est	C02	Bar-le-Duc towards Strasbourg
Châlons-en-Champagne towards Reims	C06	Saint-Dizier towards Dijon
Châlons-en-Champagne towards Épernay	L28	Revigny towards Metz
Location

Vitry-le-François station (French: Gare de Vitry-le-François) is a railway station serving the town Vitry-le-François, Marne department, eastern France. It is situated on the Paris–Strasbourg railway.
