= Hôtel de Ville, Montfermeil =

Town hall in Montfermeil, France

Hôtel de Ville
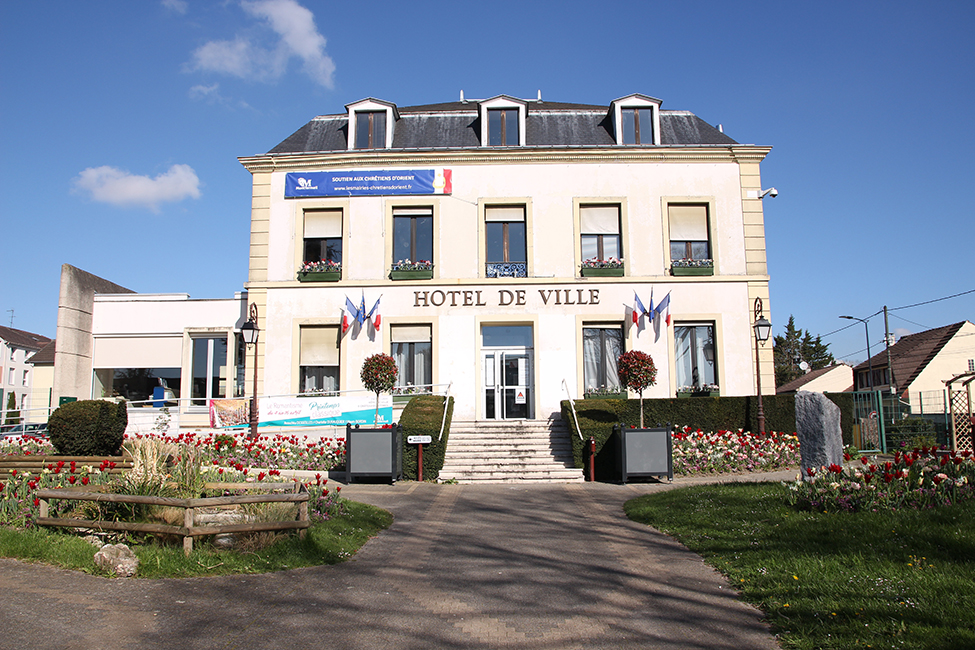
- The main frontage of the Hôtel de Ville in April 2016
- Interactive map of the Hôtel de Ville area

General information
- Type: City hall
- Architectural style: Neoclassical style
- Location: Montfermeil, France
- Coordinates: 48.9022°N 2.5709°E
- Completed: 1853

The Hôtel de Ville (French pronunciation: [otɛl də vil], City Hall) is a municipal building in Montfermeil, Seine-Saint-Denis, in the eastern suburbs of Paris, standing on Place Jean Mermoz.

== History ==
After the French Revolution, the town council initially met at the house of the mayor at the time. This arrangement continued until the early 1830s, when the council decided to establish a dedicated town hall. The site they selected was Nos. 47–49 Grande Rue (now Rue Henri Barbusse). The building was designed in the neoclassical style, built in ashlar stone and was completed in 1835. The design involved a symmetrical main frontage of four bays facing onto the Grand Rue. The left hand bay was recessed and contained a doorway on the ground floor. The building were fenestrated by segmental headed windows on the ground floor, by casement windows with pediments on the first floor and by plain casement windows on the second floor. When the building was no longer needed for municipal use, it was converted for commercial use and subsequently accommodated a sports club.

In the late 1970s, following significant population growth, the council decided to establish a more substantial town hall. The building they selected was the Haute-Futaie Estate on Place Jean Mermoz. The site had originally been assembled by a merchant, Jean Bouchu, in 1680. The treasurer-general to the king, Pierre Bertin, commissioned a house there in 1720. In 1755, the house was inherited by Jean Armand, Marquis de Joyeuse and it became known as the Château de la Folie-Joyeuse. In 1783, it became the home of Madame de Rothe, whose husband, General Charles Edward Rothe had fought in the Battle of Fontenoy in May 1745 during the War of the Austrian Succession and who had died in 1766. Madame de Rothe used the house in which to conduct her affair with the Archbishop of Narbonne, Arthur Richard Dillon. In 1815, the house was bought by the mayor of Montfermeil, Baron André Marie Thomas Caillot de Coquereaumont.

In 1852, the property was the acquired by a rich Parisian merchant, François-Ferdinand Decaen, who ordered the demolition of the old house and commissioned a new house there. The new building was designed in the neoclassical style, built in ashlar stone and was completed in 1853. The design involved a symmetrical main frontage of five bays facing onto what is now Place Jean Mermoz. The central bay featured a short flight of steps leading up to a square headed doorway. The remainder of the building was fenestrated by casement windows. The house was leased to an organisation called "La Haute Futaie" in 1910 and was then used as barracks for soldiers in the First World War.

During the Second World War it accommodated the Organisation nationale de secours (National Relief organization) and then the Comité de soutien aux prisonniers de guerre (Committee of support for prisoners of war). After the war it served as a boarding school, also known as "La Haute Futaie", before being acquired by the council in 1979. After completion of a programme of conversion works, the building was re-opened by the mayor, Gilles Guimet, in September 1982.
