= Parc Arboretum de Montfermeil =

Park and arboretum in Île-de-France, France

Coordinates: 48.896631°N 2.569706°E

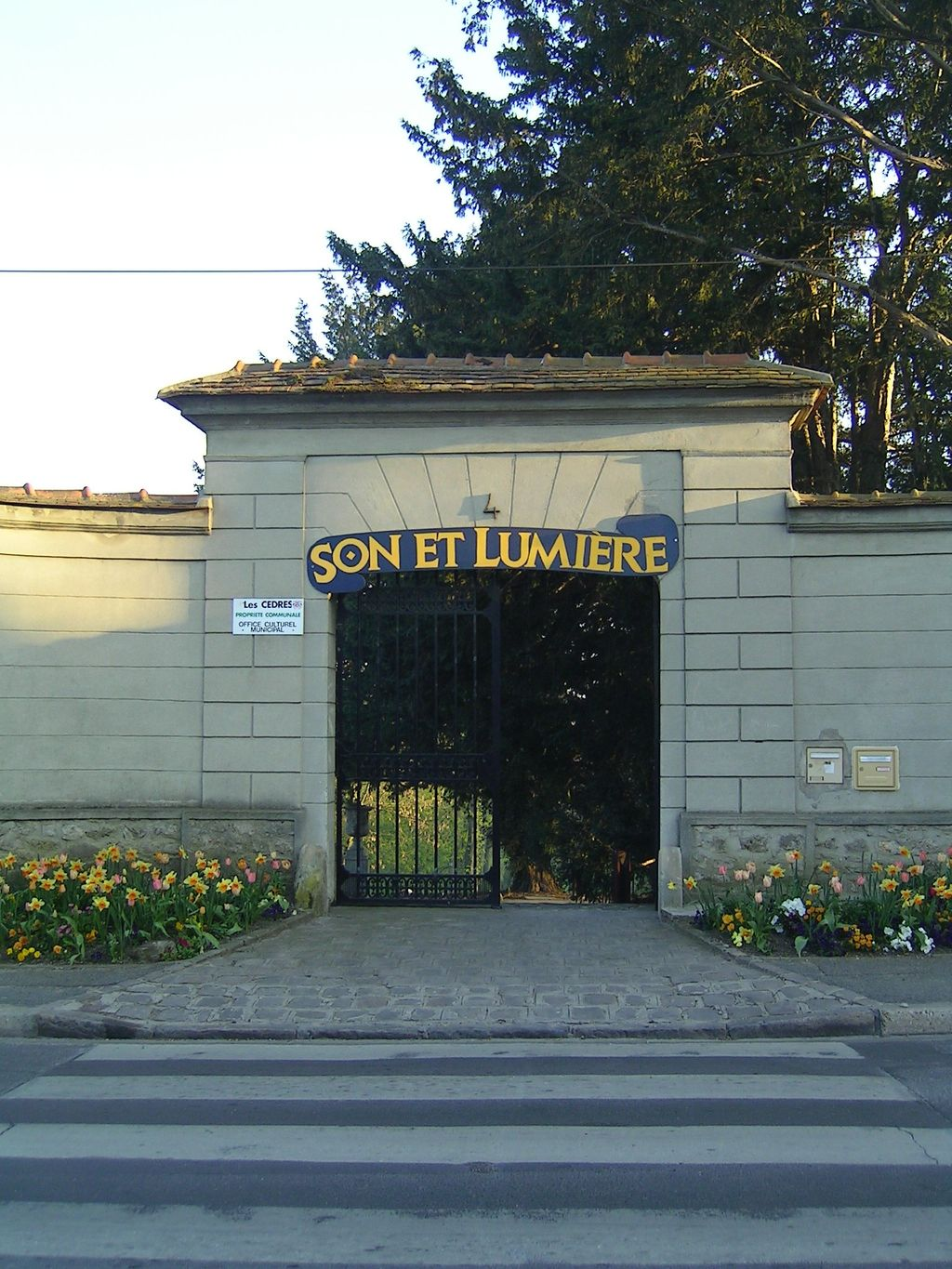

The Parc Arboretum de Montfermeil (10.9 hectares) is a park and arboretum located in Montfermeil, Seine-Saint-Denis, Île-de-France, France. It is open daily without charge.

The park was formed by combining two existing parks, the former parc du Château des Cèdres and parc Jean Valjean, with extensive landscaping during which 731 trees and bushes were planted, adding to those 489 trees already in place. It opened to the public in 2006.

The park's major feature is a long, curving dike that separates the site into two distinct sections: a large park in the natural style to the northwest, and a small, geometric space to the east. Each has its own pond on either side of the dike. The park contains 3.3 kilometers of walking and cycling paths.

The arboretum proper is planted on a set of 17 cairns throughout the entire park, organized as a "gallery of evolution" which begins at the water, then proceeds as follows: 1 origins (Ginkgo Biloba), 2 living fossils (Cryptomeria japonica, Cunninghamia lanceolata, Metasequoia, Sequoiadendron, Taxodium distichum), 3-6 dinosaurs and gymnosperms, 7-10 the Tertiary era of mammals and angiosperms, 11-17 mankind and landscaping, culminating in the Jardins Chromatiques (garden of colors).

== See also ==
- List of botanical gardens in France
