= Épernay station =

Railway station in Épernay, France

Coordinates: 49°02′48″N 3°57′37″E

Épernay
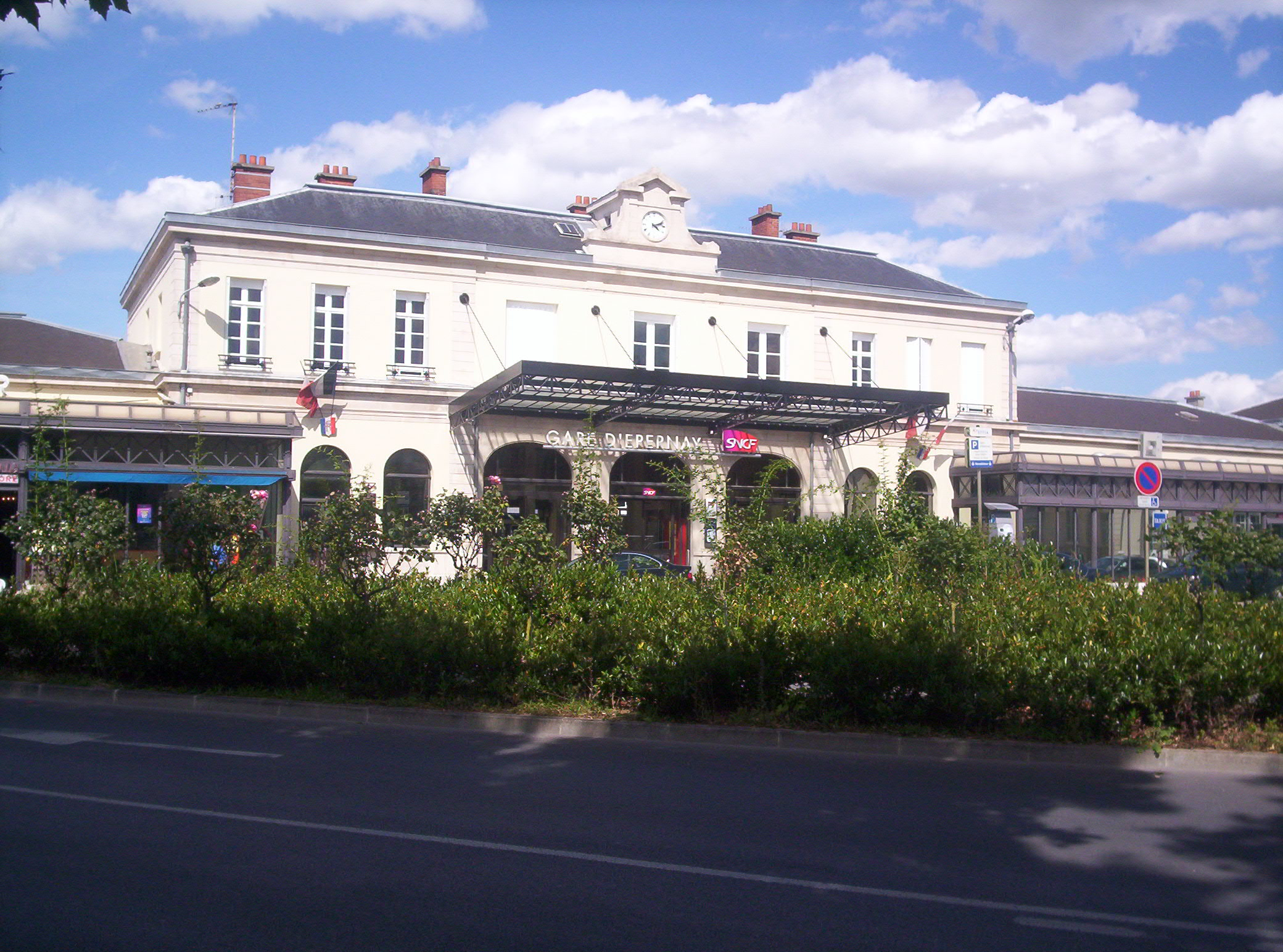

General information
- Location: Place de la Gare; 51200 Épernay; Marne, France
- Owner: SNCF
- Operator: SNCF
- Platforms: 3
- Tracks: 6

Other information
- Station code: 87171553

History
- Opened: 26 August 1849

Passengers
- 2018: 702,727

Services
| Preceding station | TER Grand Est | Following station |
|---|---|---|
| Dormans towards Paris-Est | C02 | Châlons-en-Champagne towards Strasbourg or Saint-Dizier |
| Terminus | C09 | Ay towards Reims |
| Terminus | L28 | Châlons-en-Champagne towards Metz |
Location

Épernay station (French: Gare d'Épernay) is the railway station serving the town Épernay, Marne department, northern France. It is situated on the Paris–Strasbourg railway and the Épernay–Reims railway. It is served by TER Grand Est regional trains towards Reims, Paris and Châlons-en-Champagne.
