= Sempin Windmill =

Windmill in Montfermeil, France

Moulin de Montfermeil
- Moulin de Montfermeil
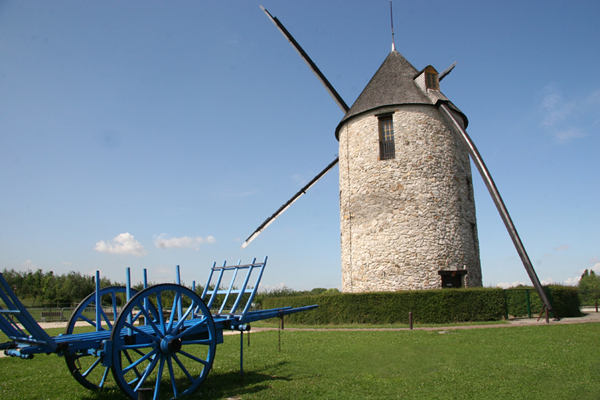
- The windmill in 2015
- 48°53′46″N 2°35′7″E
- Location: Montfermeil, Seine-Saint-Denis, France
- Type: Windmill
- Width: 23 m (75 ft)
- Height: 17 m (56 ft)
- Completion date: 1818

The Sempin Windmill, or Moulin de Montfermeil, is a windmill located in Montfermeil in the French department of Seine-Saint-Denis, approximately 20 km (12 mi) east of Paris. It is the last surviving windmill in the department.

== History ==
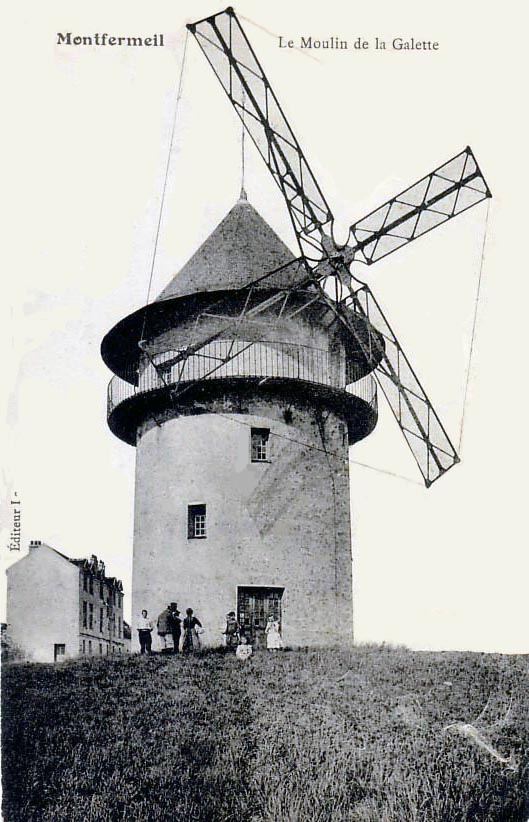
The windmill in 1900

The tower was originally built in 1740 to replace the Bruyères windmill, which had been built in 1525 but had become obsolete. It was rented for the first time by Messire Hocquart to Jacques Boyartaux on May 6, 1742. The windmill, reconstructed in 1818, fell into disrepair in the nineteenth century after it became redundant with competition from another mill. It was restored in 1896 when it was known as Moulin de la Galette and became a Sunday attraction. In the twentieth century, the windmill again began to deteriorate.

In 1972, an organization was created to protect the windmill. This group attempted to restore the building from 1978 to 1982, but the ground was riddled with old gypsum quarries which caused the windmill to collapse. Due to these unstable conditions, it was decided to rebuild the windmill 140 m (460 ft) away. Work began on restoring the windmill at its new location in 1986, and the new windmill was inaugurated on October 9, 1988. Today, the Sempin Windmill is open to the public and managed by the not-for-profit organization.

The windmill is 17 m (56 ft) high and its sails are 23 m (75 ft) wide.
