= Lycée Gustave Eiffel (Gagny) =

Lycée Gustave-Eiffel

Information
- Type: Public high school

Lycée Gustave Eiffel is a senior high school in Gagny, Seine-Saint-Denis, France, in the Paris metropolitan area.

In February 2020, six students at the school were arrested after they began building a concrete wall blocking its entrance during a protest.
