= Hôtel de Ville, Gagny =

Town hall in Gagny, France

Hôtel de Ville
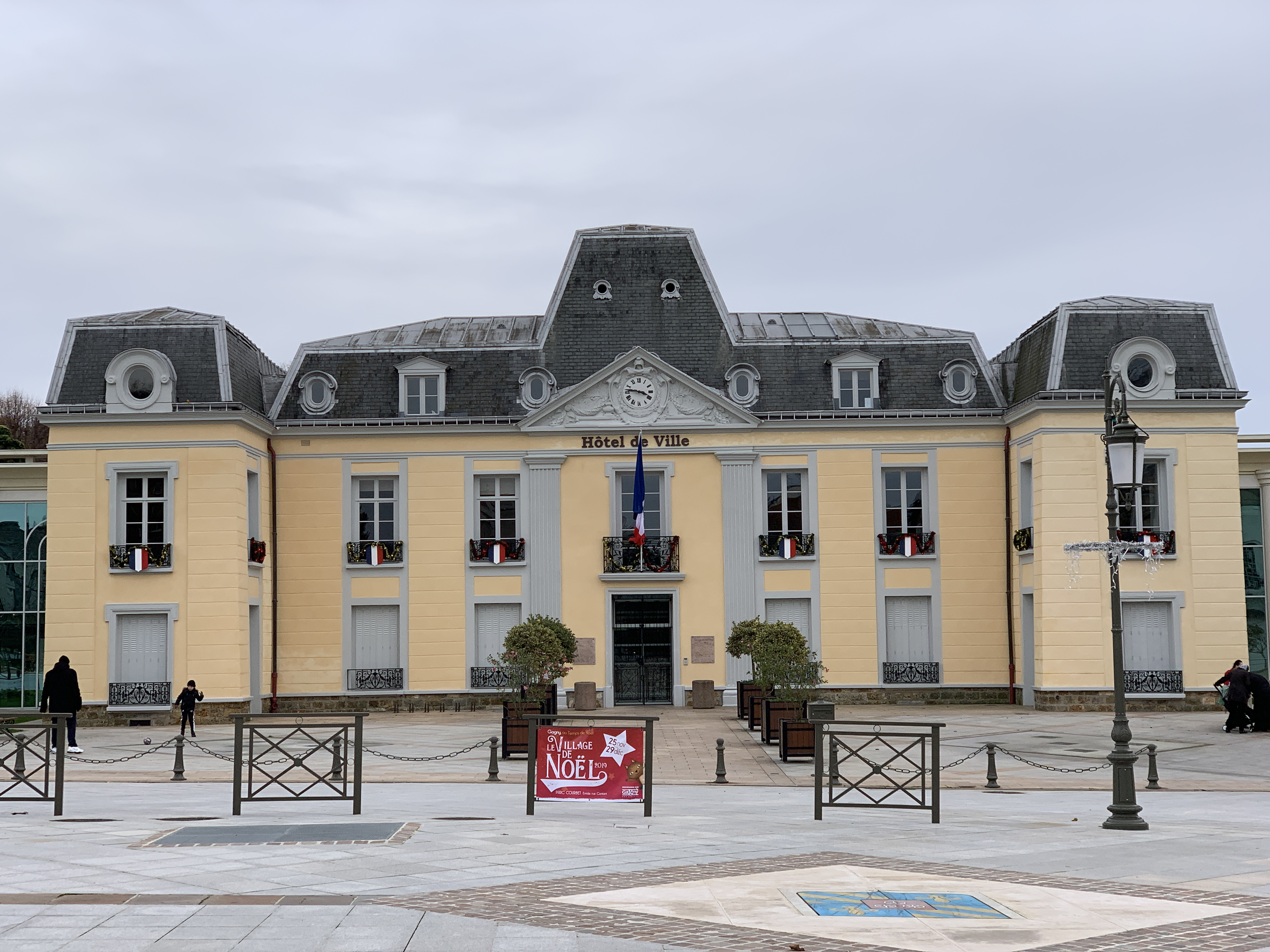
- The main frontage of the Hôtel de Ville in November 2019
- Interactive map of the Hôtel de Ville area

General information
- Type: City hall
- Architectural style: Neoclassical style
- Location: Gagny, France
- Coordinates: 48.8849°N 2.5367°E
- Completed: 1715

The Hôtel de Ville (French pronunciation: [otɛl də vil], City Hall) is a municipal building in Gagny, Seine-Saint-Denis, in the eastern suburbs of Paris, standing on Place Foch.

== History ==
The building was commissioned as a private residence for François Normand, who was a prosecutor at the Parlement of Paris, in the early 18th century. It was designed in the neoclassical style, built in stone and was completed in 1715.

The design involved a symmetrical main frontage of seven bays facing onto what is now Place Foch, with the end bays projected forward as pavilions. The central bay featured a square headed doorway with a moulded surround on the ground floor and a casement window with iron railings on the first floor. The other bays were all fenestrated in a similar style, although the windows in the end bays were enhanced by hood moulds on both floors. The central bay was flanked by full-height Doric order pilasters supporting an entablature and a pediment with a clock in the tympanum, and, at attic level, there were dormer windows flanked by oculi.

The house became the home of Normand's elderly relative, Jacques Genty de la Grange, in 1717, and was then acquired by a guards officer, Jean-Jacques Chaponel, in 1743. After briefly serving as the home of Marie-Victoire Mahé, Countess of Grimoard from 1798 to 1802, it was acquired by Louis Henri, Count of Laugier-Villars in 1803. The count went on to serve as a senior officer in the King's Guard during the reign of Louis XVIII. The house then remained in the Laugier-Villars family until 1880, when it was bought by a local merchant, Henri Nicolas Peretmère.

Meanwhile, the town council held its meetings in a room above a café until 1870, when it moved Place du Baron Roger (now Place Charles De Gaulle). After finding this arrangement unsatisfactory, the council led by the mayor, Léon Bry, decided to acquire Normand's former house for FFr70,000. After the conversion works had been completed, the building was officially opened as the town hall on 12 October 1890. Internally, the principal new room created was the Salle des Fêtes (ballroom) which was completed in 1900. The roof was modified, with a steep section created above the central bay, in 1926.

During the Paris insurrection, part of the Second World War, members of the French Resistance seized the town hall and installed a local liberation committee led by the town secretary, Lucien Millet, on 25 August 1944. This was two days before the liberation of the town by the French 2nd Armoured Division, commanded by General Philippe Leclerc, on 27 August 1944. After the war, plaques were affixed to the front of the building to commemorate the lives of a mayor, Émile Cossonneau, and deputy mayor, Alphonse Benoit, who had died in the service of France. Cossonneau was killed by German anti-aircraft fire in a Westland Lysander above Juvincourt Airfield in December 1943, while Benoit died at Auschwitz concentration camp in November 1942.

An extensive programme of refurbishment works was completed in the late 1990s.
