= Le Raincy–Villemomble–Montfermeil station =

Railway station in Le Raincy, France

Le Raincy–Villemomble–Montfermeil
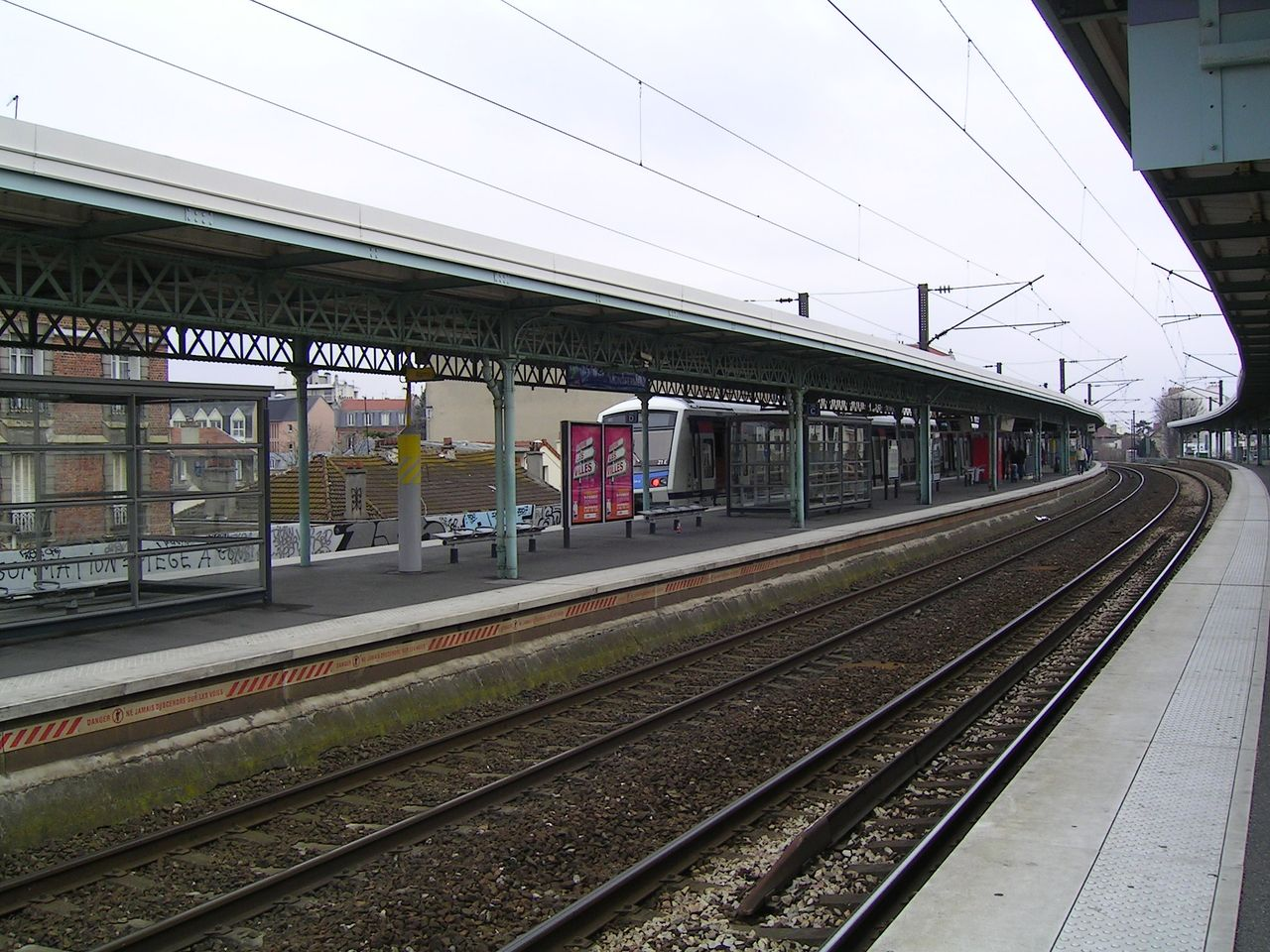
- Platforms of the station.

General information
- Location: France
- Coordinates: 48°53′21″N 2°30′45″E
- Operator: SNCF
- Line: Paris-Est–Strasbourg-Ville railway
- Platforms: 2
- Tracks: 4
- Connections: RATP Bus: 114; TRA: 601, 602, 603, 605

Construction
- Parking: 155 spaces
- Accessible: No

Other information
- Station code: 87113472
- Fare zone: 4

Passengers
- 2024: 7,632,569

Services
Preceding station	RER	Following station
Bondy towards Nanterre–La Folie	RER E	Gagny towards Chelles–Gournay
Location

Le Raincy–Villemomble–Montfermeil is a railway station in Le Raincy and Villemomble, Seine-Saint-Denis, France. The station is on the Paris-Est - Strasbourg-Ville railway. The station is served by RER line E services operated by SNCF.

== Train services ==
The station is served by the following service(s):

- Local services (RER E) Haussmann–Saint-Lazare–Chelles–Gournay
