= Gagny =

- Commune
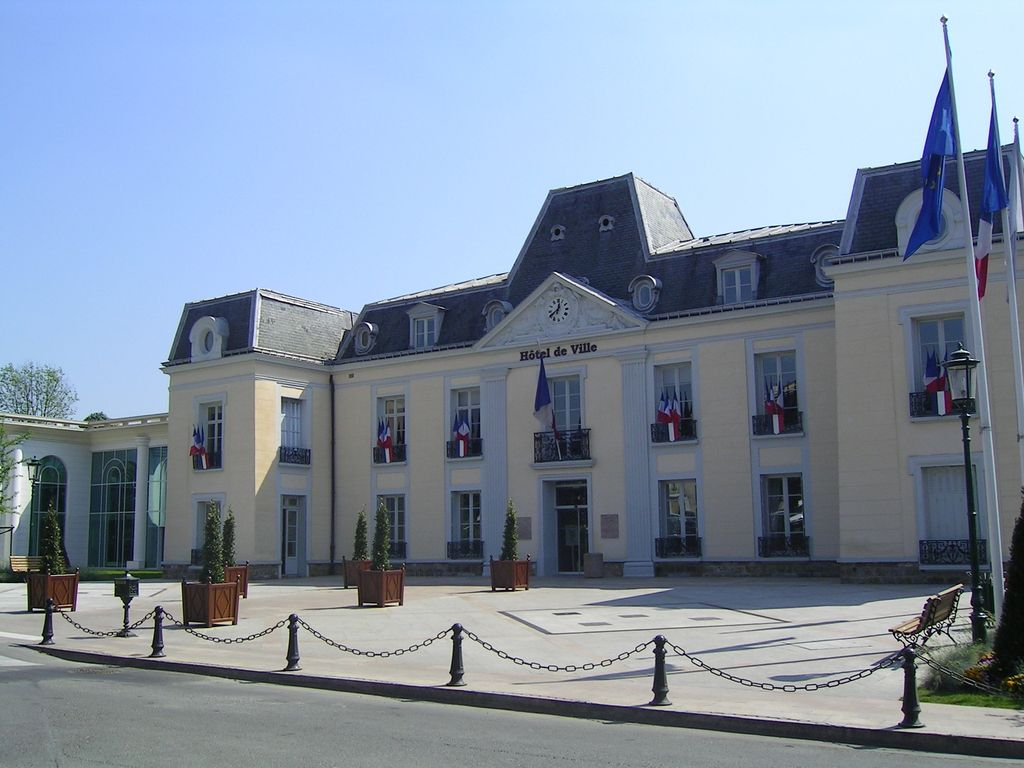
- The Hôtel de Ville

- Coat of arms

- Location (in red) within Paris inner suburbs
- Location of Gagny
- Location within France Location within Île-de-France (region)
- Coordinates: 48°53′00″N 2°32′00″E
- Country: France
- Region: Île-de-France
- Department: Seine-Saint-Denis
- Arrondissement: Le Raincy
- Canton: Gagny
- Intercommunality: Grand Paris

Government
  - Mayor (2026–32): Rolin Cranoly
- Area^{1}: 6.83 km^{2} (2.64 sq mi)
- Elevation: 80 m (260 ft)
- Population (2023): 42,313
  - Density: 6,200/km^{2} (16,000/sq mi)
- Time zone: UTC+01:00 (CET)
  - Summer (DST): UTC+02:00 (CEST)
- INSEE/Postal code: 93032 /93220
- ^{1} French Land Register data, which excludes lakes, ponds, glaciers > 1 km^{2} (0.386 sq mi or 247 acres) and river estuaries.

Gagny (French pronunciation: [ɡaɲi]) is a commune in the eastern suburbs of Paris, France. It is located 14.2 km (8.8 mi) from the center of Paris.

== Geography ==
Gagny is located 10 km to the east of Paris. Until the law of 10 July 1964, the commune was part of the department of Seine-et-Oise. The redivision of the old departments of Seine and Seine-et-Oise then made this commune a part of Seine-Saint-Denis after an administrative transfer that went into effect 1 January 1968.

== History ==
The priory was founded in the 11th century by Adela of Champagne. Gagny was the fiefdom of Étienne de Gagny, husband of Béatrice de Montfermeil in the 13th century. The priory lasted until 1771, the date de its suppression by the religious authority.

The Hôtel de Ville was built as a private house and completed in 1715.

Gagny had several castles, of which the most important, demolished in 1765, belonged to Dominique de Ferrari, Maître d'hôtel ordinaire of the king in 1660. In this park can be found the Saint-Fiacre spring, which supplied water to the park of Raincy at the end of 18th century.

The castle of Maison-Rouge, in the Louis XIII style, was successively the property of Hocquart, marquis of Montfermeil, then in 1845, it belonged to Louis Philippe I, then in 1864 to Michel-Victor Cruchet, a sculptor and artisan from Paris. In 1894, some time after the death of his wife, Michel-Victor Cruchet and his two children sold the Maison Rouge estate to the religious community of the Redemptorists. The Redemptorists then set up a convent there. It was then bought in 1913 by the Boué sisters, dressmakers of renown. Upon the death of the second sister, in 1953, it was acquired by the city. It was devastated at the end of World War II, and the castle was demolished in 1955.

During the French Revolution, the church, after being shut down, was transformed into a Temple of Reason.

Gagny was occupied by Allied troops during 1814–1815, then by the Prussians during the siege of Paris of 1870.

On 20 May 1869, a small part of the territory of Gagny was detached and merged with a part of the territory of Livry-Gargan and a part of the territory of Clichy-sous-Bois to create the commune of Le Raincy.

During the First World War (1914-1918), the taxis requisitioned by Paris and its suburbs assembled in front of city hall. They were charged with taking soldiers to the Front (close to Nanteuil-le-Haudouin) for repulsing the German offensive.

== Politics ==
Until the law of 10 July 1964, the commune was part of the department of Seine-et-Oise. After the redivision of the old departments of Seine and Seine-et-Oise, the commune belonged to Seine-Saint-Denis. The transfer was put into effect 1 January 1968.

The commune is part of the canton of Gagny.

== Twin towns ==
In 1974, Gagny became twinned with the English towns of Sutton and Bishop Auckland. In 1978, Gagny became twinned with Gladsaxe, Denmark.

== Heraldry ==
Arms of Gagny	The arms of Gagny are blazoned : Quarterly: 1 & 4: bendy Or and azure, 2 & 3: azure, a fleur de lys Or; overall on an inescutcheon gules, 3 automobile wheels argent.
motto: Exierunt mille ad victoriam (a thousand go out to victory)

== Transport ==
Gagny is served by two stations on Paris RER line E: Gagny and Le Chénay – Gagny.

The city is also serviced by several bus lines. Additionally, a municipal shuttle is available for travelers. It follows two routes : the first services the southern part of the community, and the second services the north.

== Population ==
=== Demographics ===
Historical population

Year	Pop.	±% p.a.
1793	828	—
1821	798	−0.13%
1846	993	+0.88%
1851	1,084	+1.77%
1856	1,120	+0.66%
1861	1,347	+3.76%
1866	1,487	+2.00%
1872	1,735	+2.60%
1876	1,954	+3.02%
1881	2,358	+3.83%
1886	3,007	+4.98%
1891	3,236	+1.48%
1896	3,670	+2.55%
1901	4,057	+2.03%
1906	4,954	+4.08%
1911	5,920	+3.63%

Year	Pop.	±% p.a.
1921	6,736	+1.30%
1926	9,736	+7.65%
1931	13,253	+6.36%
1936	13,495	+0.36%
1946	13,783	+0.21%
1954	17,255	+2.85%
1962	29,004	+6.71%
1968	35,780	+3.56%
1975	36,772	+0.39%
1982	34,861	−0.76%
1990	36,059	+0.42%
1999	36,715	+0.20%
2007	38,220	+0.50%
2012	39,172	+0.49%
2017	39,358	+0.09%
2023	42,313	+1.21%

Source: EHESS and INSEE (1968-2023)

=== Education ===
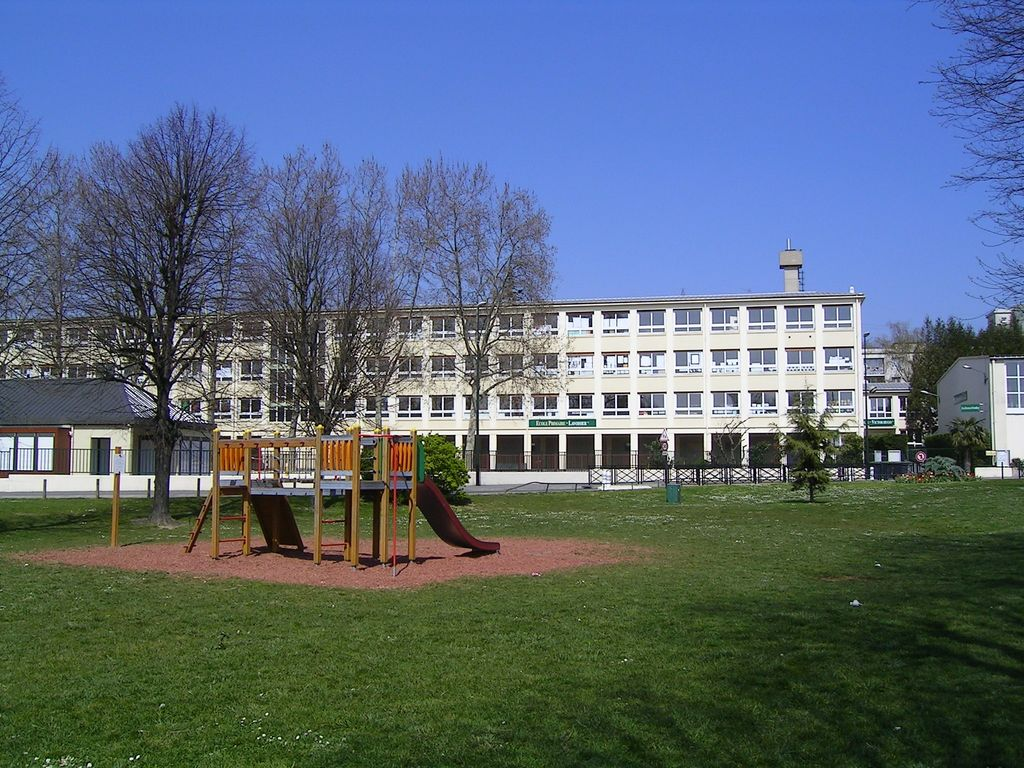
École primaire Lavoisier

Public primary schools in the commune include:

- 9 preschools/nurseries (maternelles)
- 9 elementary schools

Public secondary schools in the commune include:

- Junior high schools (collèges): Madame de Sévigné, Pablo Neruda, Théodore Monod
- Senior high schools/sixth form colleges: Lycée Gustave Eiffel, Lycée Jean-Baptiste Clément

Private schools in the commune include:

- Ecole Sainte Jeanne d'Arc and Association Merkaz Hatorah (preschools and elementary schools).

=== Religion ===
Gagny is home to a number of religious groups, including Catholics, Jews, Muslims, Orthodox, and Protestants.

==== Catholic churches ====
- Église Sainte-Thérèse de Gagny
- Église Saint-Germain de Gagny
- Église Sainte-Bernadette de Gagny (parish church)

==== Synagogues ====
- Synagogue of Raincy-Villemomble-Gagny
- Community of Merkaz Hatorah

==== Mosques ====
- Association alqalam des Dahlias
- Association As-Salam
- Association ABCG

These three organizations are united by the Union of Associated Muslims of Gagny.

==== Orthodox churches ====
- Saint-Séraphin de Saroy

==== Protestant churches ====
The Protestant community linked to the Reformed Church of France has a place of worship.

== Economy ==
On the border of Raincy, old quarries where gypsum was removed since the seventeenth century are still visible. The exploitation of fine plaster, known as "Paris," was the main industry in Gagny until the 1950s. The old Mussat quarries closed down in 1965.

By the end of the nineteenth century, in certain abandoned quarries, mushrooms were already being grown in Paris.

The former gypsum quarries of Gagny were replaced by a large shopping center project, which itself was replaced by the wood of the star, a plantation of trees.

== Sports ==
The handball team USM Gagny was one of the best teams in France during the 1980s, where they won the French Championship five times.

== See also ==
- Communes of the Seine-Saint-Denis department
