= Mourmelon-le-Petit station =

French railway station

Coordinates: 49.1313°N 4.3179°E

Mourmelon-le-Petit
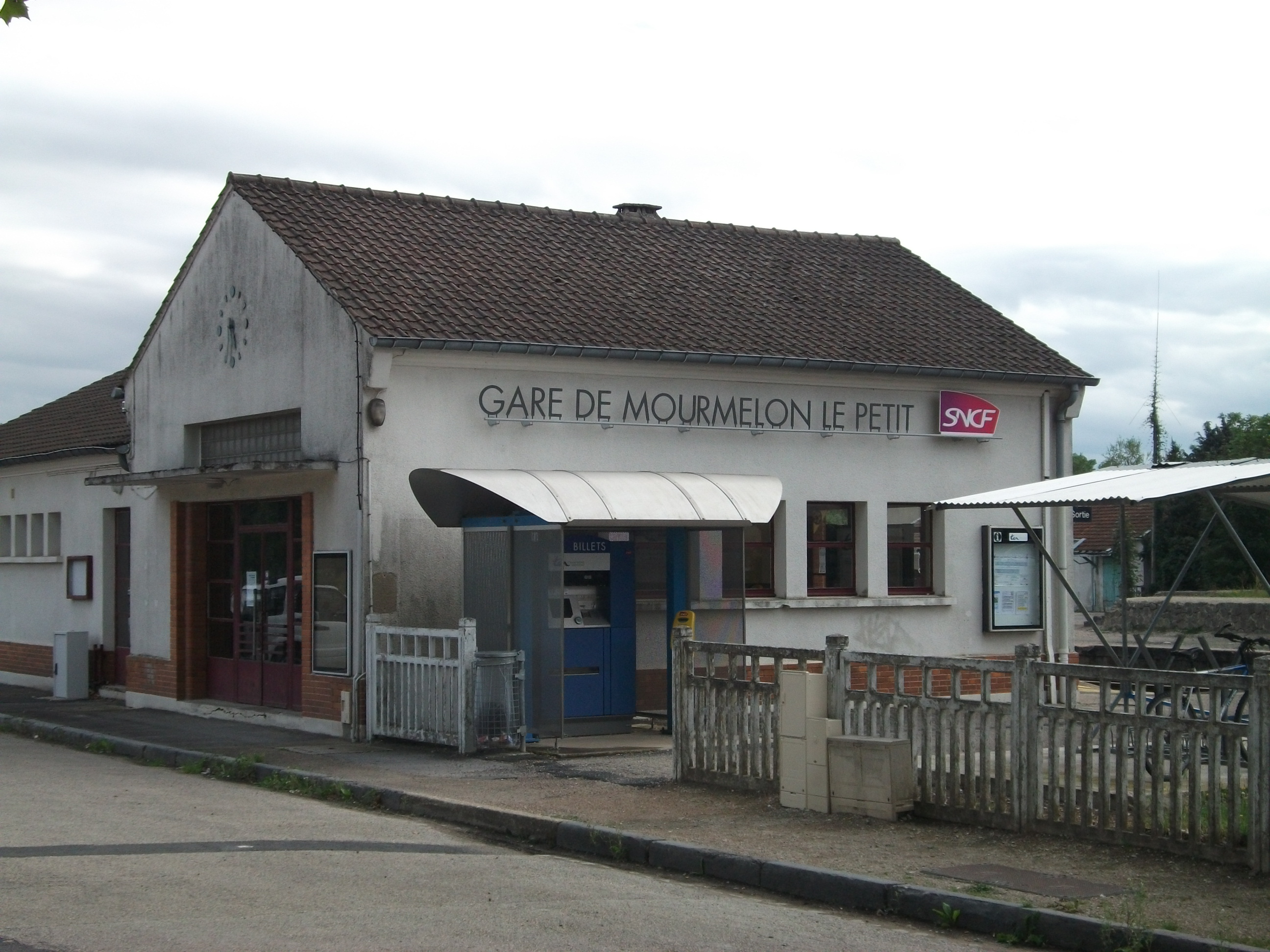
Location

The Mourmelon-le-Petit station is a French railway station on the line from Châlons-en-Champagne to Reims-Cérès, located in the area of the commune of Mourmelon-le-Petit, in the Marne department in the region Grand Est.

It was put into service in 1857 by the la Compagnie des chemins de fer de l'Est. It is a station of the French National Railway Company (SNCF), served by trains from the TER Grand Est network.

== Station location ==
The Mourmelon-le-Petit station is located at kilometer point (PK) 196.068 of the line from Châlons-en-Champagne to Reims-Cérès, between the stations at Sept-Saulx and Bouy. Its altitude is 107 metres (351 ft).

== History ==
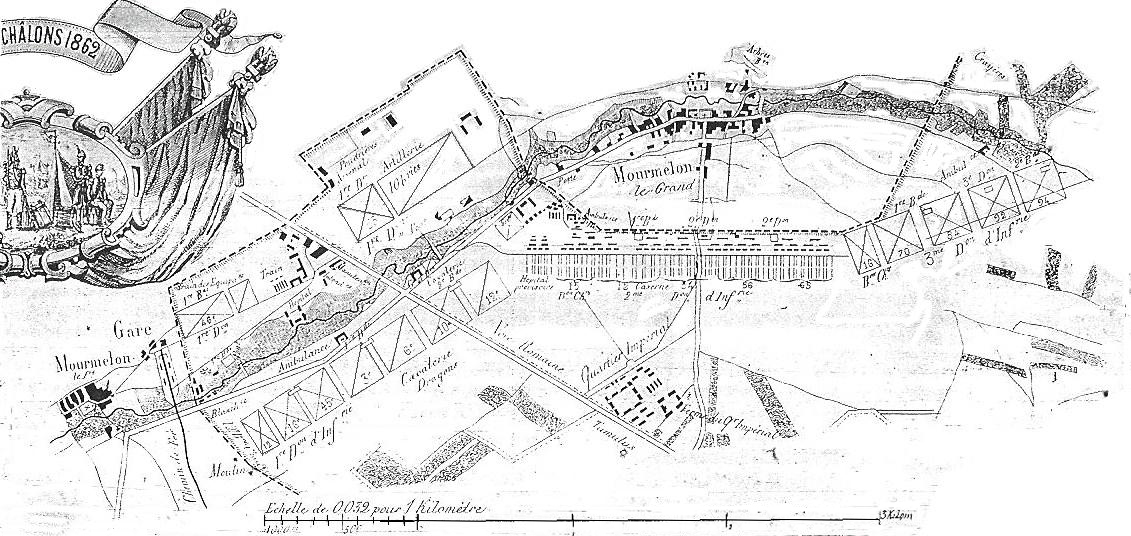
In 1857 the station showed as terminal.

The terminal station of the Châlons branch in Mourmelon was put into service on October 14, 1857 during the opening of the single-track line planned to serve Camp de Châlons, a military post.

== Ridership ==
According to SNCF estimates, the annual ridership at the station is shown in the table below.

Ridership at Mourmelon-le-Petit Train Station
Year	2019	2018	2017	2016	2015
Riders	79,829	72,417	79,372	72,917	76,858

== Services for riders ==
=== Hospitality ===
SNCF has a passenger building with a counter open from Monday to Friday. It is equipped with a machine for TER transport tickets.

=== Access ===
Mourmelon-le-Petit is served by TER Grand Est trains which travel between the stations Reims and Châlons-en-Champagne and between Reims and Dijon-Ville.

=== Connections ===
Parking for bicycles and vehicles are provided.
