= Christian Potel =

French footballer (born 1973)

Personal information
- Date of birth: December 16, 1973 (age 52)
- Place of birth: Montfermeil, France
- Height: 1.83 m (6 ft 0 in)
- Position: Goalkeeper

Senior career*
Years	Team	Apps	(Gls)
1994–1995	Cannes	0	(0)
1996–1998	Noisy-le-Sec		
1998–1999	Laval	0	(0)
1999–2001	did not play		
2001–2002	Noisy-le-Sec		
2002–2004	Boulogne		
2004–2008	Libourne	101	(0)
2008–2010	Mulhouse		
2010–2011	Béziers	0	(0)
- * Club domestic league appearances and goals as of 22:44, 23 November 2009 (UTC)

Christian Potel (born December 16, 1973, in Montfermeil, Seine-Saint-Denis) is a French former professional football goalkeeper.

He played on the professional level in Ligue 2 for FC Libourne-Saint-Seurin.

He played for AS Cannes in Coupe de la Ligue.
