= Chelles–Gournay station =

Railway station in Chelles, France

Chelles–Gournay
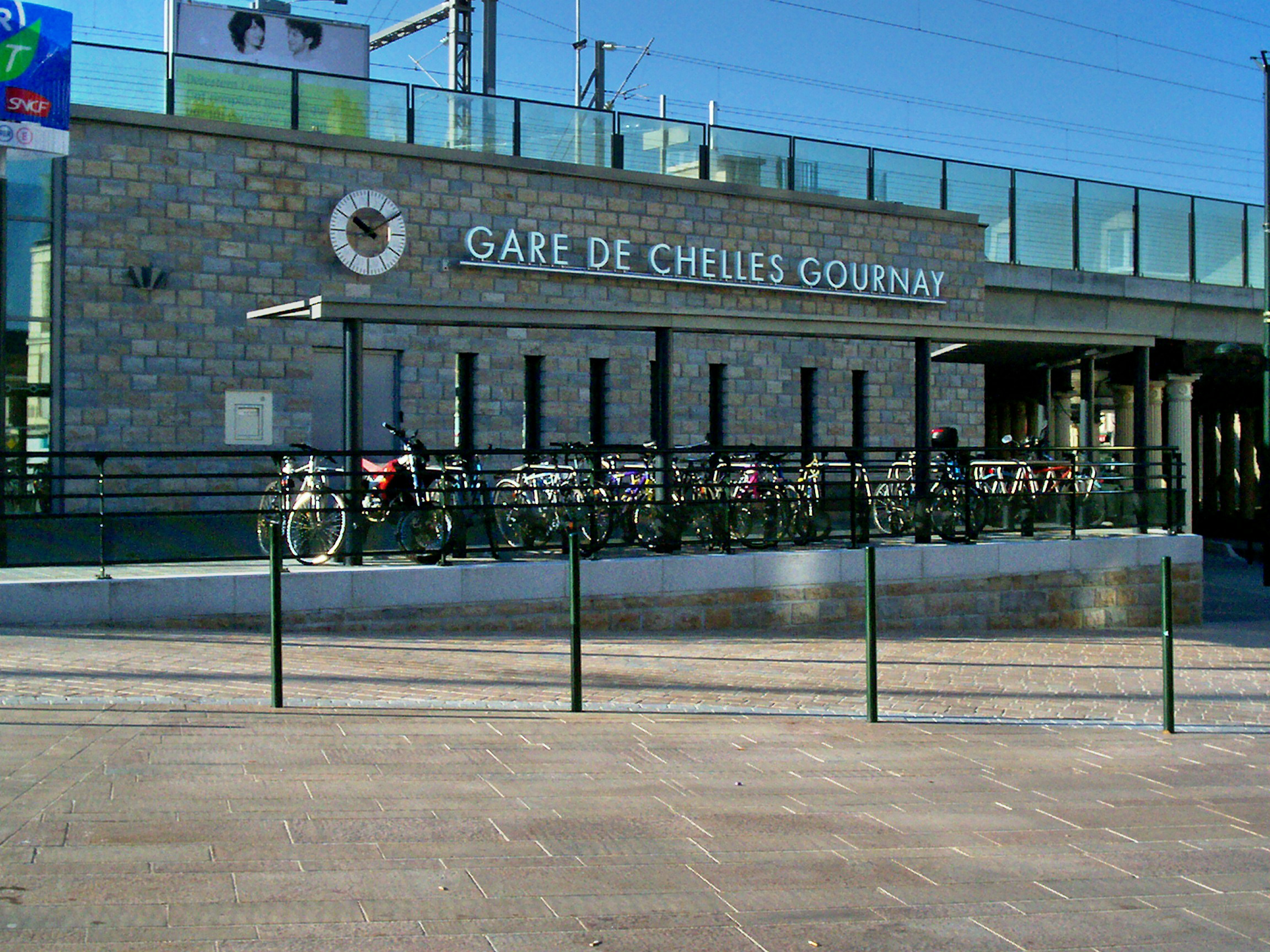

General information
- Location: Main entrance (North next to the city center) : Place Gasnier-Guy ; 2 other entrances in the south of the station : Av. de l'Espérance; Chelles; France
- Coordinates: 48°52′27″N 2°35′0″E
- Elevation: 46 m (151 ft)
- Operator: the SNCF
- Line: Paris-Est–Strasbourg-Ville railway
- Platforms: 4
- Tracks: 6
- Bus routes: Noctilien: N23 N141; RATP Bus: 113; Marne et Brie (formerly Apolo7) : 1, 2, 3, 4, 6, 7, 8, 8s ,9 , 9s ,TàD , 213; Seine-et-Marne Express: 19; TRA: 613; Autobus du Fort: 701

Construction
- Parking: 544 spaces
- Accessible: Yes, by prior reservation

Other information
- Station code: 87116111
- Fare zone: 4
- Website: https://www.transilien.com/fr/gare/chelles-gournay-8711611

History
- Opened: 5 July 1849

Passengers
- 2024: 11,363,257

Services
Preceding station	RER	Following station
Le Chénay-Gagny towards Nanterre–La Folie	RER E	Terminus
Preceding station	Transilien	Following station
Paris-Est Terminus	Line P	Vaires-Torcy towards Meaux
Location

Chelles–Gournay (French pronunciation: [ʃɛl ɡuʁnɛ]) is a railway station in Chelles, Seine-et-Marne, France. The station opened in 1849 and is on the Paris-Est–Strasbourg-Ville railway. The station is served by Transilien line P (East Paris) and RER Line E services operated by the SNCF. It will also see services operated by Grand Paris Express (Paris Metro Line 16) in the future which will be operated by Keolis .

== History ==
In 1846, the municipality of Chelles it accepted the passage of the line from Paris to Strasbourg on the territory of the commune. However, it specifies that the station must be built to the north of the tracks to be accessible directly from the urbanized area. The commune then had 1,700 inhabitants.

Since 14 July 1999, the RER E serves the station. Between 1999 and 2007 the station was rebuilt to make way for the LGV Est, which included the building of new entrances to the station.

== Train services ==
The station is served by the following services:

- Commuter services (RER E) from Haussmann–Saint-Lazare to Chelles–Gournay
- Regional services (Transilien P) from Paris-Est to Meaux
- Paris Metro Line 16 from Saint-Denis–Pleyel to Noisy–Champs in the future as part of Grand Paris Express.

== Bus services ==
The station is served by services including:

- Marne et Brie bus lines 1, 2, 3, 4, 6, 7, 8, 8s, 9 ,9s and 213
- Seine-et-Marne Express line 19
- RATP Group line 113
- TRA bus line 613
- Noctilien night bus lines N23 and N141

== Gallery ==
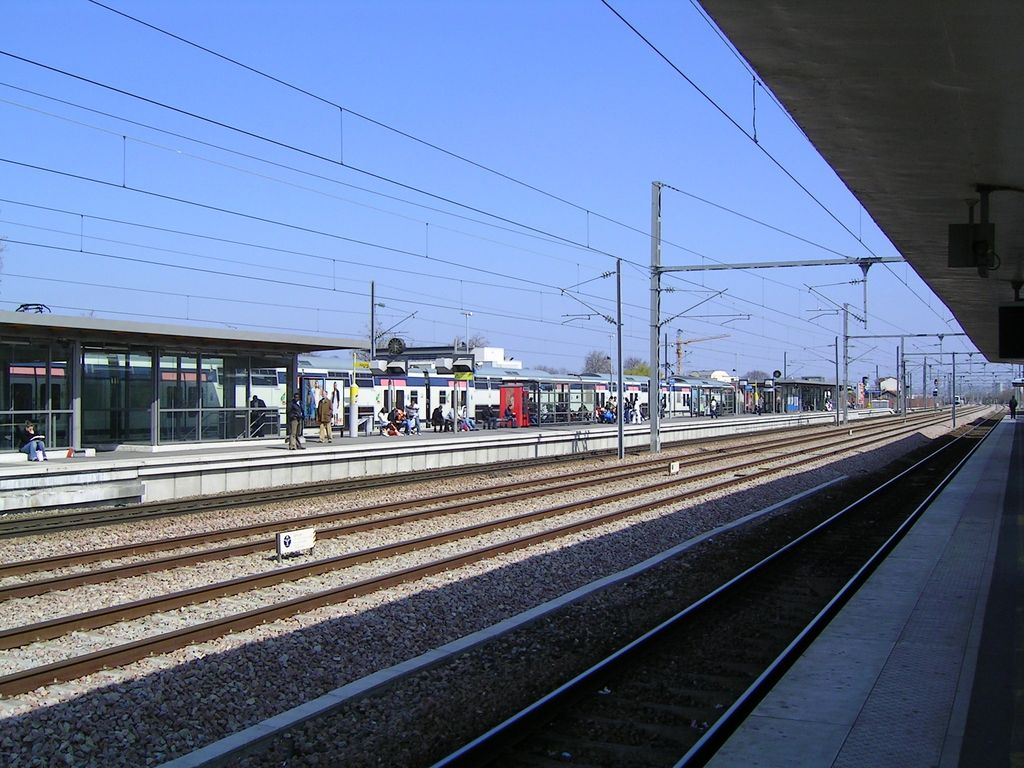
Overview

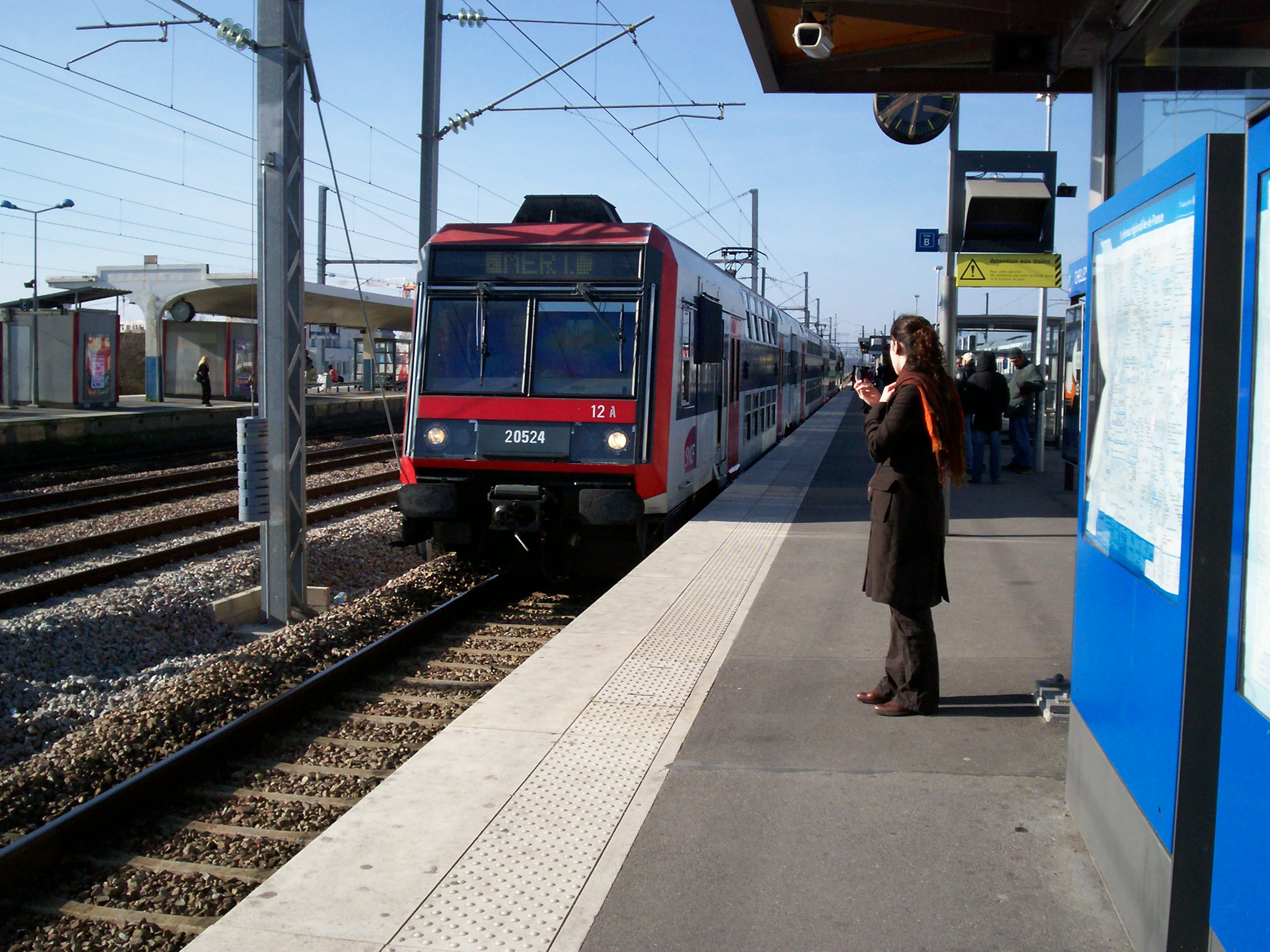
A Z 20500 train bound to Meaux arriving at the station

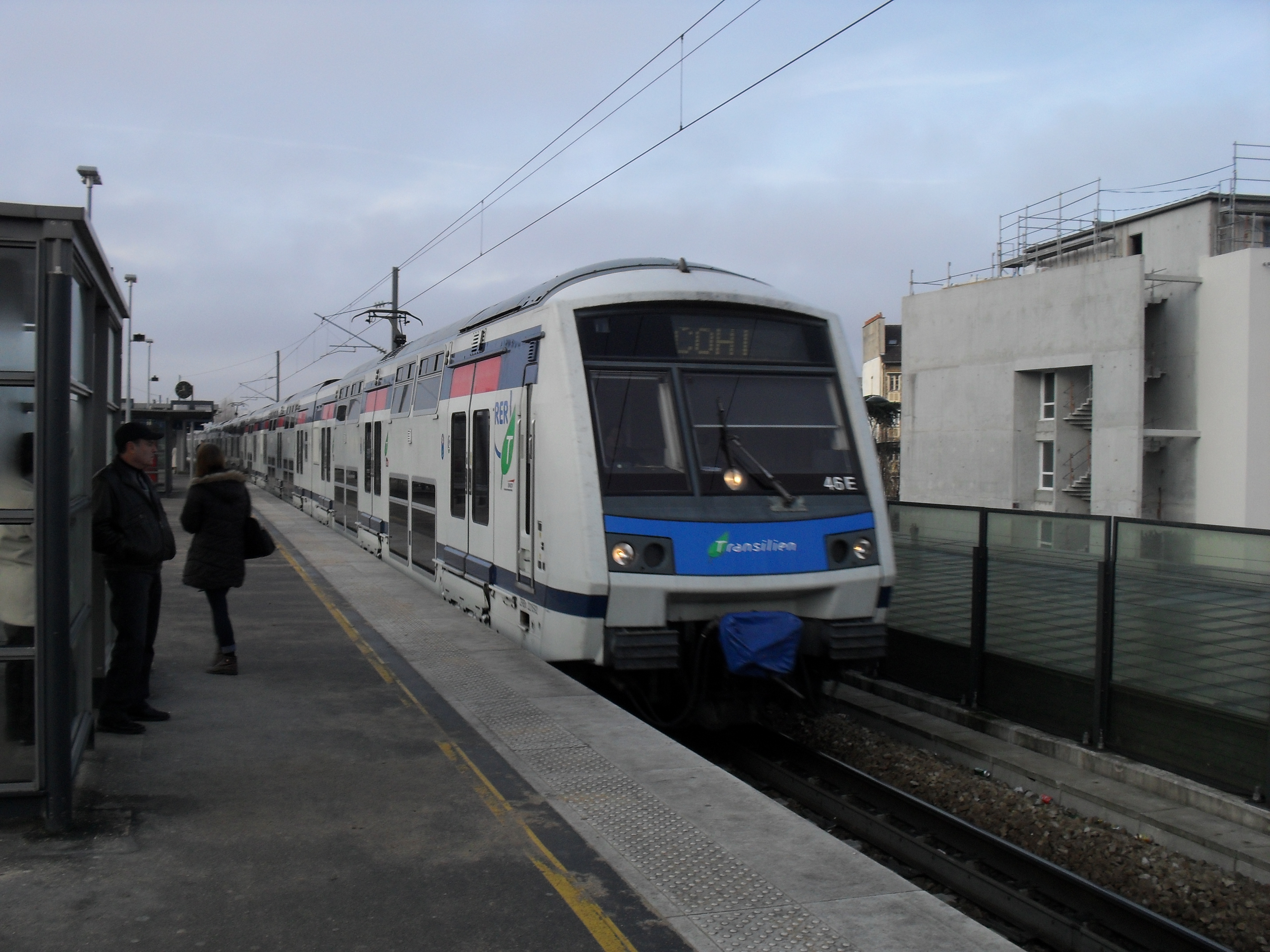
A Z 22500 train leaving the station
