= Paris-Est–Strasbourg-Ville railway =

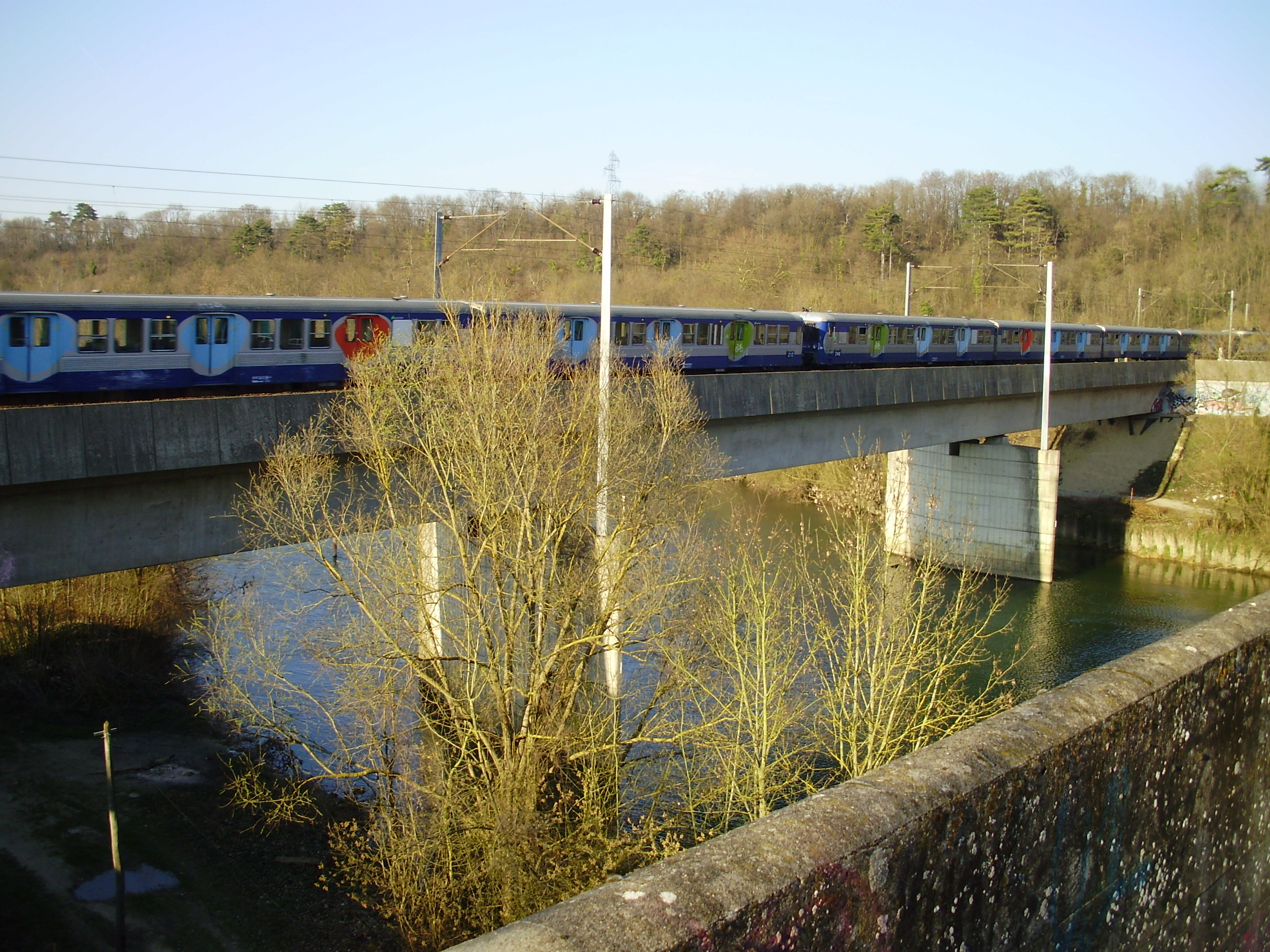
- The railway at Chalifert

Overview
- Status: Operational
- Owner: SNCF
- Locale: France (Île-de-France, Hauts-de-France, Grand Est
- Termini: Noisy-le-Sec; Strasbourg

Service
- System: SNCF
- Operator(s): SNCF

History
- Opened: 1849–1852

Technical
- Line length: 493 km (306 mi)
- Number of tracks: Double track
- Track gauge: 1,435 mm (4 ft 8 1/2 in) standard gauge
- Electrification: 25 kV 50 Hz

The railway from Paris-Est to Strasbourg-Ville is a 493-kilometre-long railway line that connects Paris to Strasbourg via Châlons-en-Champagne and Nancy, France. Officially, the line does not start at the Gare de l'Est in Paris: the first 9 km until Noisy-le-Sec is shared with the railway from Paris to Mulhouse. The railway was opened in several stages between 1849 and 1852. The opening of the LGV Est high speed line from Paris to Baudrecourt in Lorraine in 2007 has decreased the importance of the section Paris–Sarrebourg for passenger traffic.

== Route ==
The Paris-Est–Strasbourg-Ville railway branches off the Paris-Est - Mulhouse-Ville railway at Noisy-le-Sec. It continues in eastern direction, following the river Marne upstream and crossing it several times. The main stations along this section are Meaux, Château-Thierry, Épernay, Châlons-en-Champagne and Vitry-le-François. After Vitry, it continues east, following the small rivers Saulx and Ornain upstream. It passes Bar-le-Duc, and crosses the river Meuse near Commercy. It enters the Moselle valley at Toul, and follows the Moselle downstream until Frouard.

The railway continues upstream along the river Meurthe, through Nancy and Lunéville. It continues east through Sarrebourg, and crosses the main Vosges Mountains ridge near Saverne. It descends along the small river Zorn until Brumath, where it turns south and enters the agglomeration of Strasbourg.

=== Main stations ===
The main stations on the Paris–Strasbourg railway are:

- Gare de Châlons-en-Champagne
- Gare de Nancy-Ville
- Strasbourg

== History ==
The railway Paris–Strasbourg had already been planned in 1833, and its route had been defined in 1844. It was built and exploited by the Compagnie du chemin de fer de Paris à Strasbourg, that became part of Chemins de fer de l'Est in 1854. The first section that was opened in 1849 led from Paris to Châlons-sur-Marne. In 1850 a line from Nancy to Frouard, and a line from Châlons to Vitry-le-François were built. In 1851 a line from Vitry-le-François to Commercy, and a line from Sarrebourg to Strasbourg were built. Finally in 1852 the sections between Commercy and Frouard, and between Nancy and Sarrebourg were opened.

== Services ==
The Paris–Strasbourg railway is used by the following passenger services:

- TGV on the sections from Paris to Vaires-sur-Marne, from Châlons-en-Champagne to Bar-le-Duc, from Frouard to Nancy, and from Sarrebourg to Strasbourg
- ICE Paris–Munich on the sections from Paris to Vaires-sur-Marne, and from Sarrebourg to Strasbourg
- TER Grand Est regional services on the whole line
- Transilien regional services on the section between Paris and Château-Thierry
- RER E Paris rapid transit on the section between Paris and Chelles-Gournay
