= Line 19 =

Line 19 may refer to:

== China ==
- Line 19 (Beijing Subway)
- Line 19 (Chengdu Metro)
- Line 19 (Guangzhou Metro) (planned)
- Line 19 (Hangzhou Metro)
- Line 19 (Shanghai Metro) (planned)
- Line 19 (Wuhan Metro)

== Other countries ==
- Paris Metro Line 19, a planned line in France
- Line 19 (São Paulo Metro), a planned line in Brazil
- Line 19, part of the Green Line (Stockholm Metro), in Sweden

== See also ==
- List of public transport routes numbered 19
