= Route 19 =

Route 19 may refer to:

- One of several highways - see List of highways numbered 19
- One of several public transport routes - see List of public transport routes numbered 19
