= Paris Metro =

Rapid transit system of Paris, France

Métro de Paris

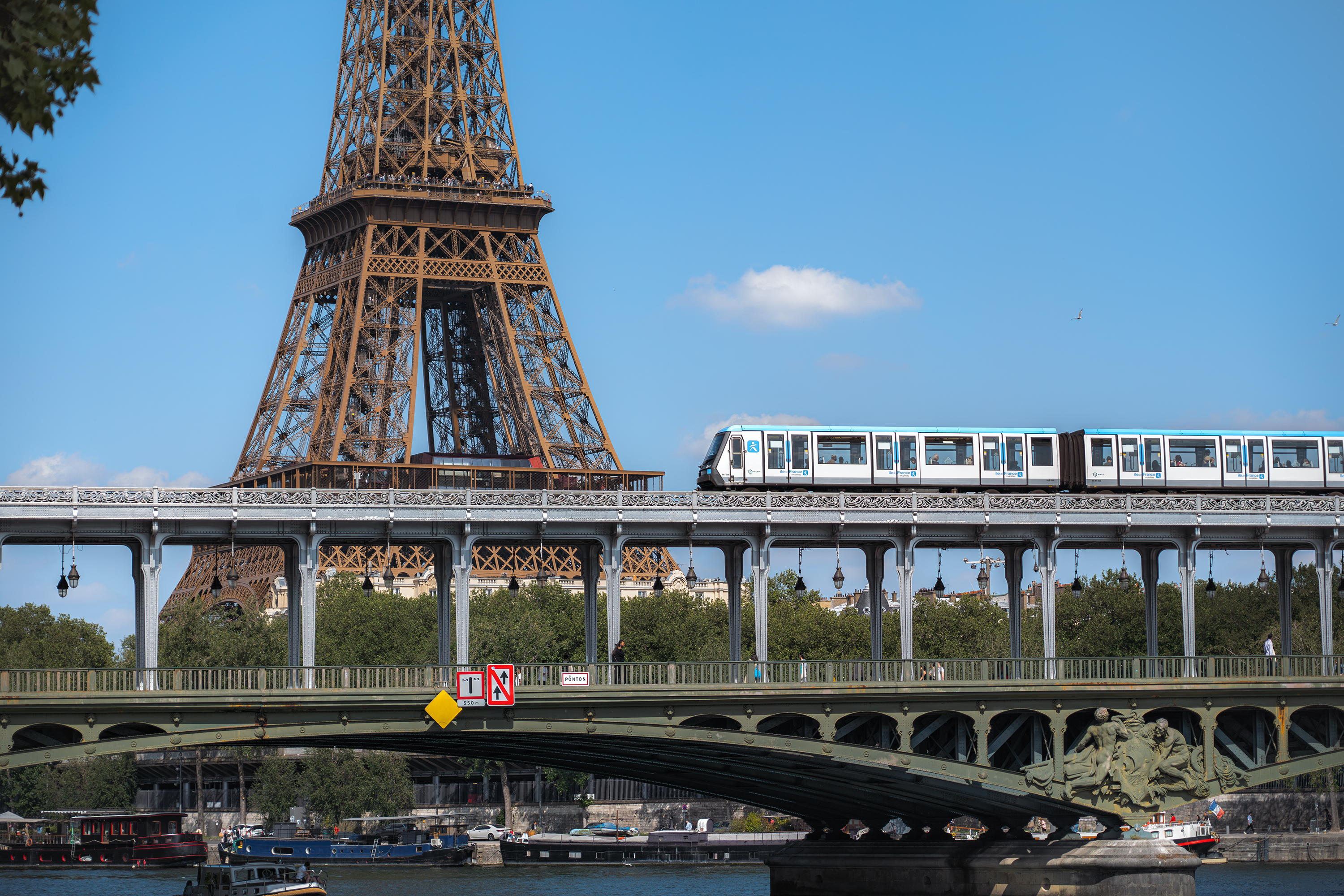
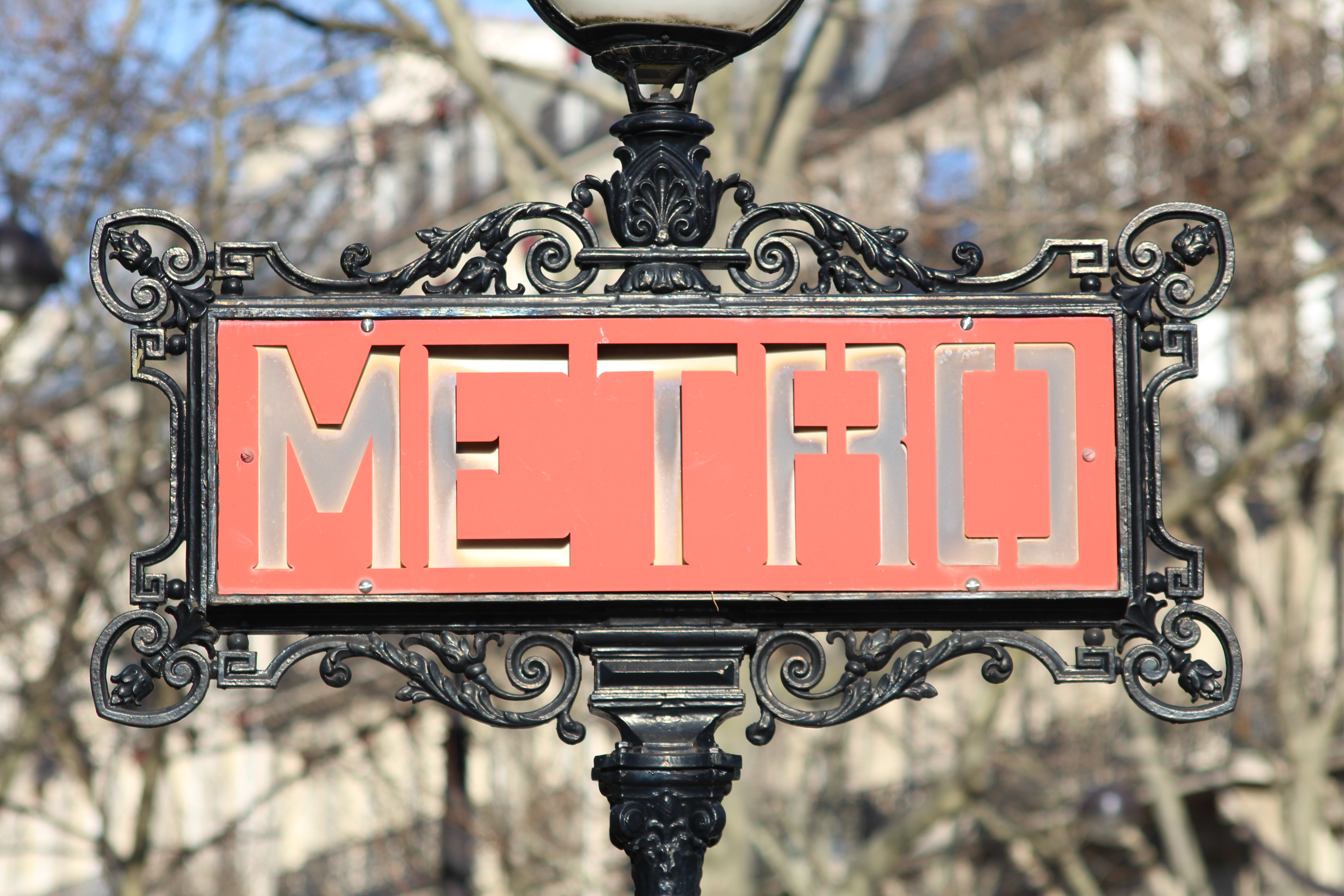
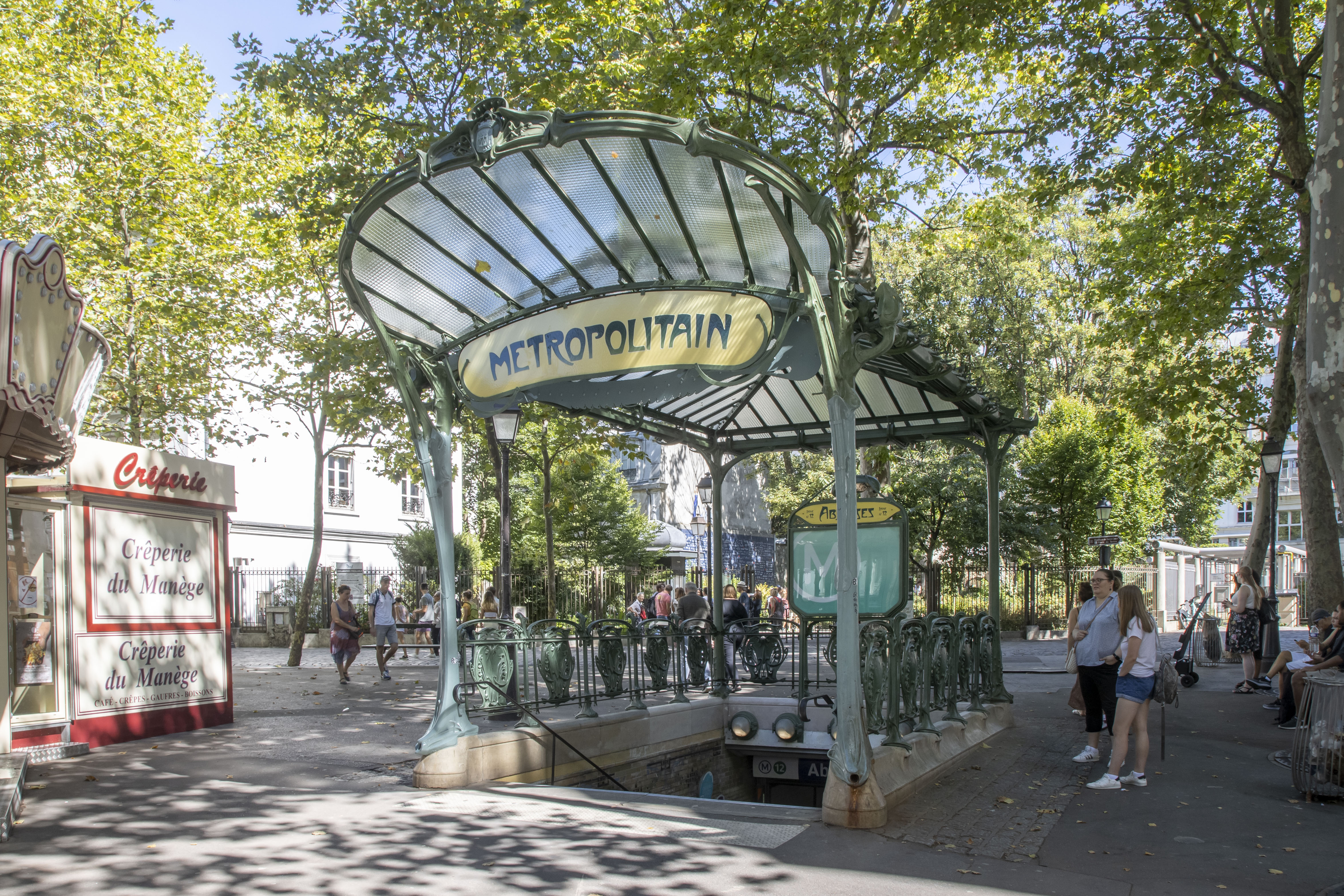
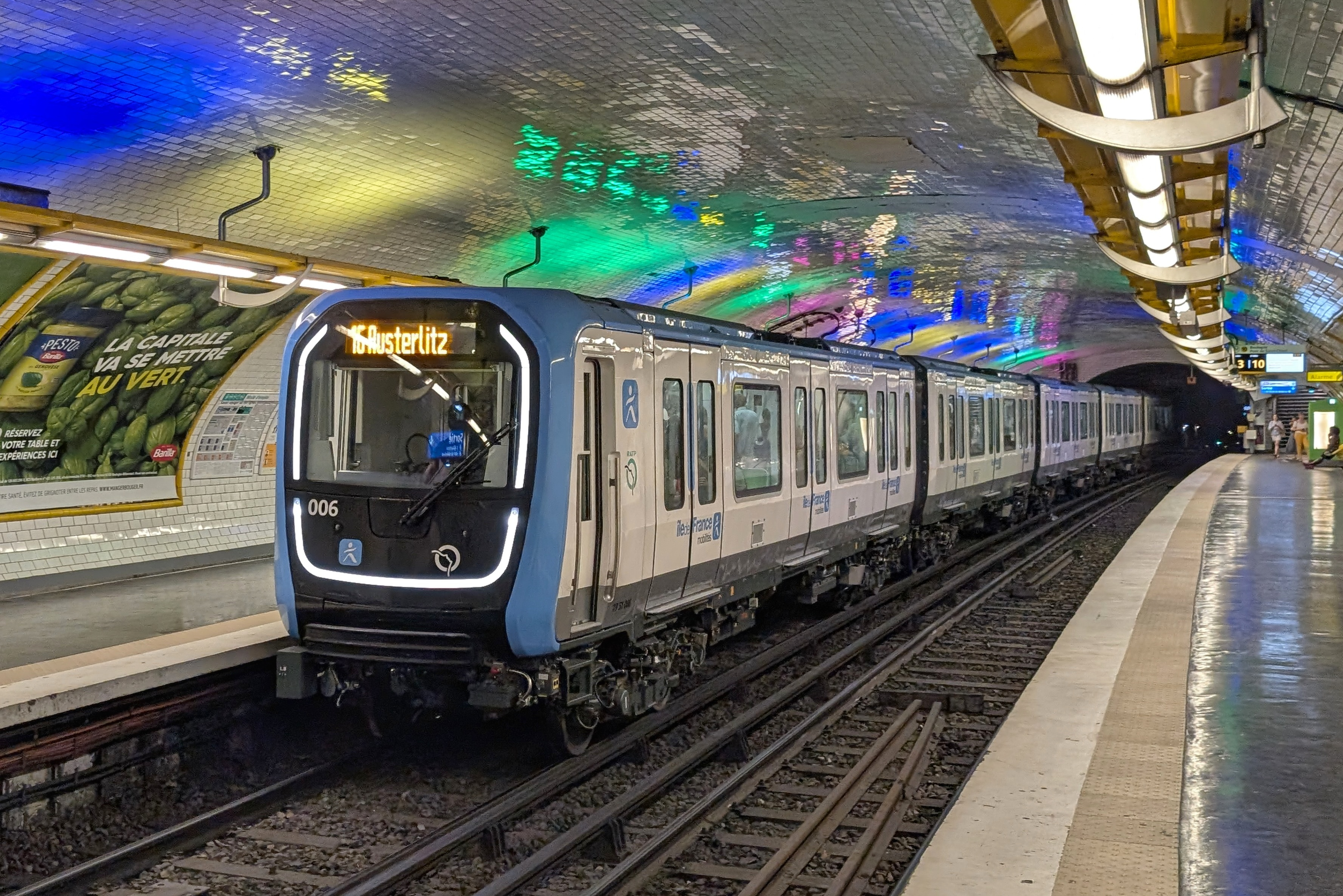

Overview
- Native name: Métropolitain de Paris
- Owner: RATP Group (infrastructure); Île-de-France Mobilités (rolling stock)
- Locale: Paris metropolitan area
- Transit type: Rapid transit
- Number of lines: 16 (numbered 1–14, 3bis and 7bis) with 4 more under construction, 1 under planning
- Number of stations: 321 (Note: The number is 321 if stations are counted individually. If transfers are counted by just adding up the number of stops in each line, the number is 405.)
- Daily ridership: 4.17 million (2025 average)
- Annual ridership: 1.523 billion (2025)

Operation
- Began operation: 19 July 1900; 126 years ago
- Operator: RATP
- Number of vehicles: 775 trains

Technical
- System length: 245.6 km (152.6 mi)
- Track gauge: 1,435 mm (4 ft 8 1/2 in) standard gauge
- Electrification: 750 V DC third rail (conventional lines) or guide bar (rubber-tyred lines)
The Métro network (2026)

The Paris Metro, (Note: French: Métro de Paris, pronounced [metʁo d(ə) paʁi], or Métro parisien, pronounced [metʁo paʁizjɛ̃].) short for Métropolitain, (Note: French pronunciation: [metʁɔpɔlitɛ̃].) is a rapid transit system serving the Paris metropolitan area in Île-de-France, the region of France's capital. A symbol of the city, it is known for its density within the capital's territorial limits, as well as its uniform architecture and historical entrances influenced by Art Nouveau. The system is 245.6 kilometres (152.6 mi) long, mostly underground, as well as its 321 stations of which 61 allow the riders to transfer between the sixteen lines (with an additional four under construction and one in project), all numbered 1 to 14, with two extra branches, 3bis and 7bis, named such as they are former parts of Lines 3 and 7 respectively. Three of these lines (1, 4 and 14) are fully automated, and the additional four are also planned as such. Lines are identified on maps by an individual number and an associated specific colour, all part of an official palette, with the traveling direction indicated by the terminus, the last stop on each line. All trains travel from one end of the line to the other, serving every station along the way. The Paris Metro is operated by the Régie autonome des transports parisiens (RATP), which also operates part of the RER (commuter standard train) network, most of the tram lines and many bus routes around and within Paris itself.

It is the second-busiest metro system in Europe, as well as the twelfth-busiest in the world. It carried 1.523 billion passengers in 2025, roughly 4.17 million passengers a day, which makes it the most used public transport system in Paris, even more than the RER which uses higher-capacity standard-gauge trains. It is one of the densest metro systems in the world, with 244 stations within the 105.4 km^{2} (41 sq mi) of the City of Paris. Châtelet–Les Halles, with five Metro and three RER commuter rail lines, is one of the world's largest metro stations. The system generally has poor accessibility for people with reduced mobility due to its old age (established 126 years ago) and because most of the current infrastructure was built before accessibility standards emerged, with only few stations retrofitted since. However, all new infrastructure and rolling stock meets current accessibility standards, including modern extensions of historic lines.

The first line opened without ceremony on 19 July 1900, during the World's Fair (Exposition Universelle). The system expanded quickly until World War I, with its core complete by the 1920s. Extensions into the suburbs were started in the 1930s. The network reached saturation after World War II and new trains were built in order to allow higher traffic, but further improvements were limited by the network's design and, in particular, the short distances between stations. In 1998, Line 14 opened with the intention to relieve RER A. The eastbound extension of Line 11 towards Rosny–Bois-Perrier in 2024 is the network's most recent extension. A large expansion programme known as the Grand Paris Express (GPE) is currently under construction with four new orbital Metro lines (named lines 15, 16, 17 and 18) around the Île-de-France region, outside the limits of Paris, in order to alleviate the traffic on the near-exclusively radial historic network. Further plans exist for Line 1 east, Line 7 north, Line 10 east, Line 12 south and a merger of Lines 3bis and 7bis, as well as a new proposed Line 19 in the city's northernmost urbanised suburbs across the Val-d'Oise department.

Besides the Metro, central Paris and its urban area are served by five RER lines (602 km or 374 mi with 257 stations), fourteen tramway lines (186.6 km or 115.9 mi with 278 stations), nine Transilien suburban trains (1,299 km or 807 mi with 392 stations), in addition to three VAL lines at Charles de Gaulle Airport and Orly Airport. This makes Paris one of the best served cities by public transportation in the world. Despite the network's uniform architecture, several of its stations stand out because of their unique design. The Metro itself has become an icon in popular culture, being frequently featured in cinema and mentioned in music. In 2021, the RATP started offering an umbrella lending service at several Metro and RER stations, highlighting the Metro's own rabbit mascot, which advises children on staying away from the closing doors.

== Naming ==
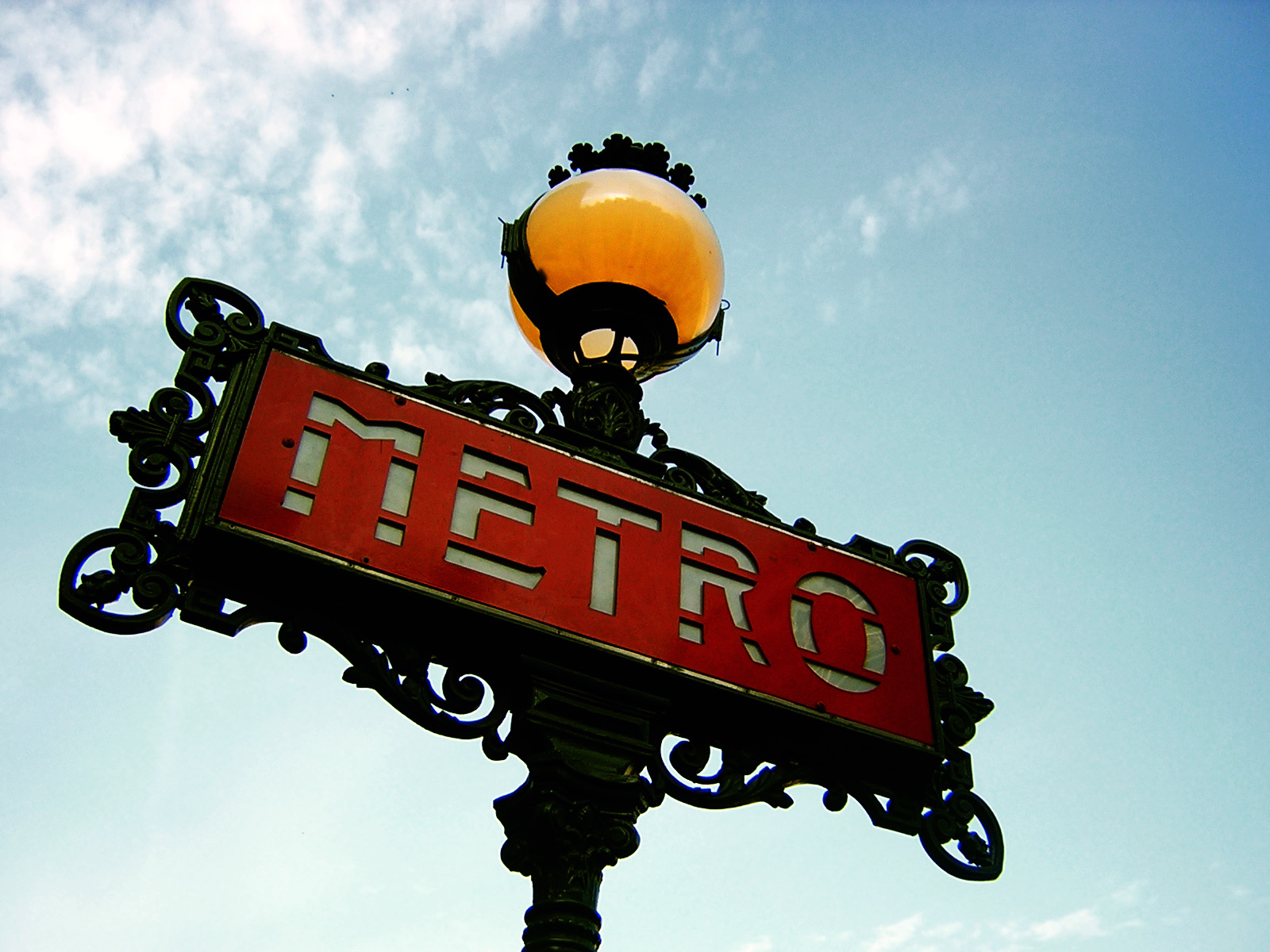
Metro signage

Metro is the abbreviated name of the company that originally operated most of the network: the Empain group subsidiary Compagnie du chemin de fer métropolitain de Paris S.A. (Paris Metropolitan Railway Company Ltd), also known as CMP. The name was directly inspired by the 1863 London Metropolitan Railway (French: Chemin de fer métropolitain de Londres), which had been commonly abbreviated as "métropolitain" in French since the late Second Empire.

CMP was known as "Le Métropolitain", which quickly became abbreviated to Métro, which became a common designation and brand name for rapid transit systems in France and elsewhere. 'Metro' has been adopted in many languages, making it the most used word for an urban rapid transit system.

The Metro is operated by the Régie autonome des transports parisiens (RATP), a public transport authority that also operates part of the RER network, light rail lines and many bus routes within and around Paris.

The Construction of the Metropolitan Railway by Luigi Loir (1900), André-Diligent Museum of Art and Industry, Roubaix.

== History ==
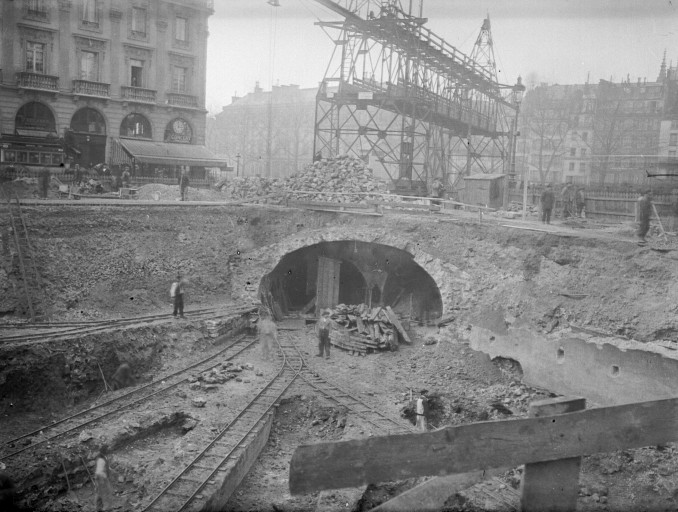
During the initial construction of the Metro, the tunnels were excavated in open sites and then covered.

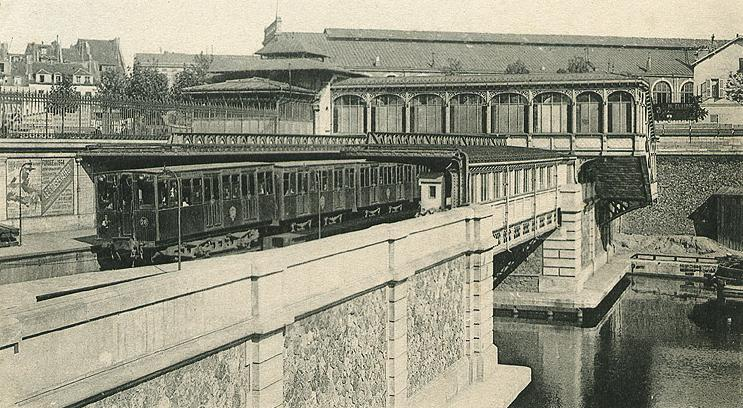
Bastille station at the beginning of the 20th century

By 1845, Paris and the railway companies were already thinking about an urban railway system to link inner districts of the city. The railway companies and the French government wanted to extend mainline railways into a new underground network, whereas the Parisians favoured a new and independent network and feared national takeover of any system it built. The disagreement lasted from 1856 to 1890. Meanwhile, the population became denser and traffic congestion grew massively. The deadlock put pressure on the authorities and gave the city the green light.

Prior to 1845, the urban transport network consisted primarily of a large number of omnibus lines, consolidated by the French government into a regulated system with fixed and unconflicting routes and schedules. The first concrete proposal for an urban rail system in Paris was put forward by civil engineer Florence de Kérizouet. This plan called for a surface cable car system. In 1855, civil engineers Edouard Brame and Eugène Flachat proposed an underground freight urban railway, due to the high rate of accidents on surface rail lines.

Paris had orbital railways before it had a metro: the Petite Ceinture inside the city walls, built from 1852 to 1869 with 40% of underground sections for merchandise transport, then passengers service from 14 July 1862 beginning on the north and east section of Clichy-Bercy with underground parts, and the Grande Ceinture, finished in 1886 further out.

On 19 November 1871 the General Council of the Seine commissioned a team of 40 engineers to plan an urban rail network. This team proposed a network with a pattern of routes "resembling a cross enclosed in a circle" with axial routes following large boulevards. On 11 May 1872 the Council endorsed the plan, but the French government turned down the plan. After this point, a serious debate occurred over whether the new system should consist of elevated lines or of mostly underground lines; this debate involved numerous parties in France, including Victor Hugo, Guy de Maupassant, and the Eiffel Society of Gustave Eiffel, and continued until 1892. Eventually the underground option emerged as the preferred solution because of the high cost of buying land for rights-of-way in central Paris required for elevated lines, estimated at 70,000 francs per metre of line for a 20 meters (65 ft 7 in)-wide railway.

The last remaining hurdle was the city's concern about national interference in its urban rail system. The city commissioned renowned engineer Jean-Baptiste Berlier, who designed Paris's postal network of pneumatic tubes, to design and plan its rail system in the early 1890s. Berlier recommended a special track gauge of 1,300 mm (4 ft 3 3/16 in) (versus the standard gauge of 1,435 mm or 4 ft 8 1/2 in) to protect the system from national takeover, which inflamed the issue substantially. The issue was finally settled when the Minister of Public Works begrudgingly recognised the city's right to build a local system on 22 November 1895, and by the city's secret designing of the trains and tunnels to be too narrow for mainline trains, while adopting standard gauge as a compromise with the state.

=== Fulgence Bienvenüe project ===
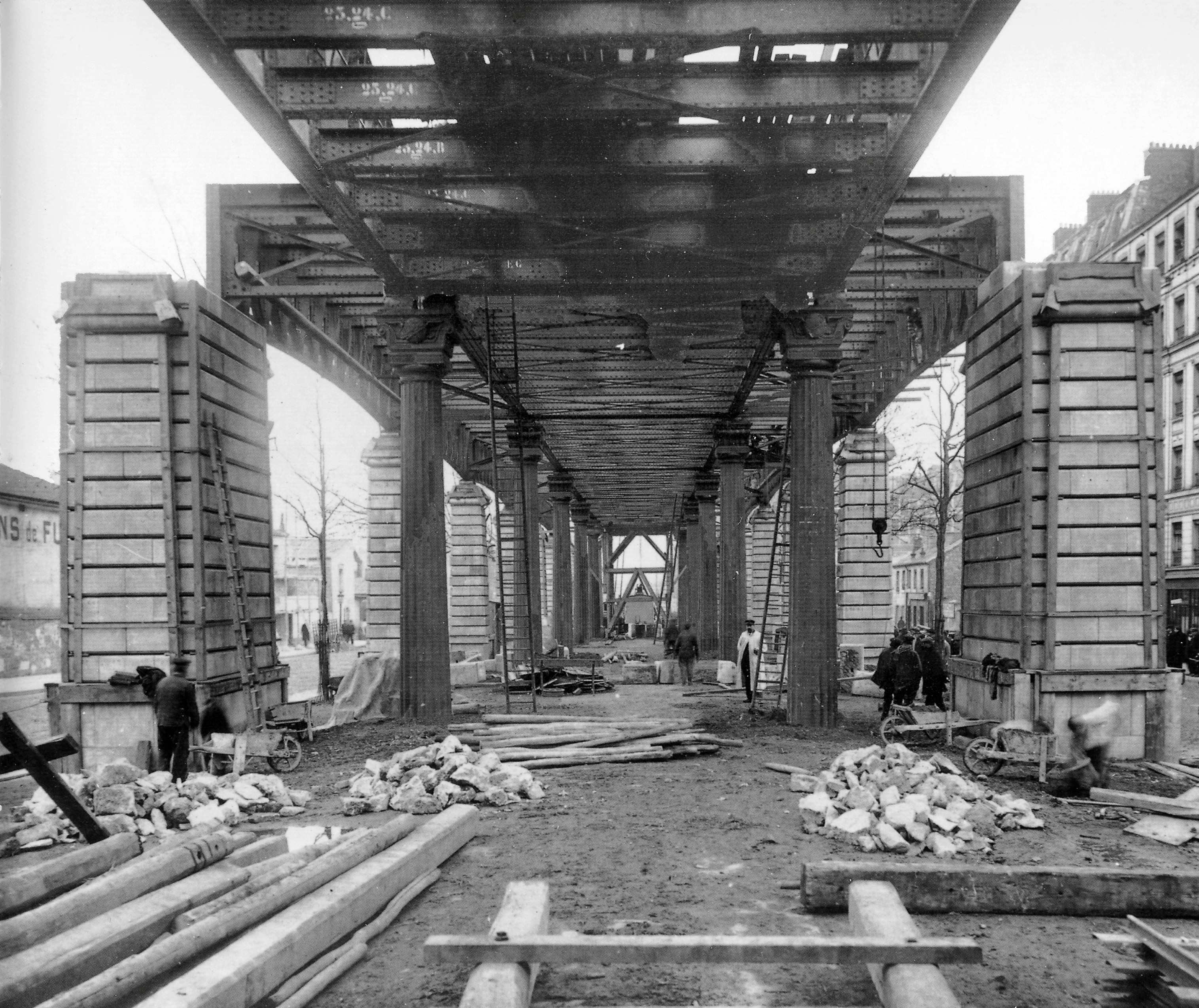
Construction of Chevaleret station, 1903

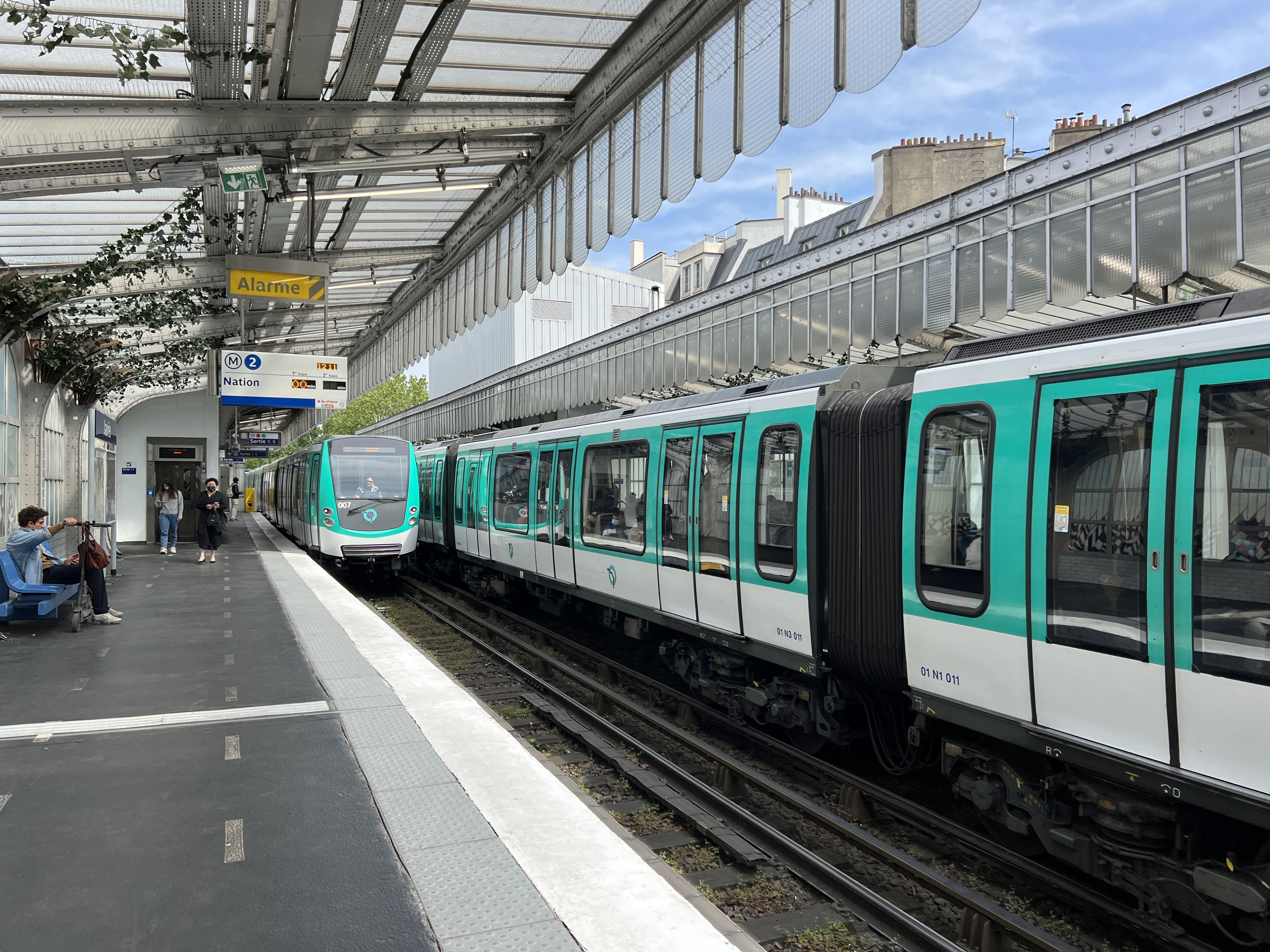
Line 2 at Jaurès station

On 20 April 1896, Paris adopted the Fulgence Bienvenüe project, which was to serve only the city proper of Paris. Many Parisians worried that extending lines to industrial suburbs would reduce the safety of the city. Paris forbade lines to the inner suburbs and, as a guarantee, Metro trains were to run on the right, as opposed to existing suburban lines, which ran on the left.

Unlike many other subway systems (such as that of London), this system was designed from the outset as a unified system, initially of nine lines. Such a large project required a private-public arrangement right from the outset – the city would build most of the permanent way, while a private concessionaire company would supply the trains and power stations, and lease the system (each line separately, for initially 39-year leases). In July 1897, six bidders competed, and The Compagnie Generale de Traction, owned by the Belgian Baron Édouard Empain, won the contract; this company was then immediately reorganised as the Compagnie du chemin de fer métropolitain.

Construction began in November 1898. The first line, Porte Maillot–Porte de Vincennes, was inaugurated on 19 July 1900 during the Paris World's Fair. Entrances to stations were designed in Art Nouveau style by Hector Guimard. Eighty-six of his entrances are still in existence.

Bienvenüe's project consisted of 10 lines, which correspond to current Lines 1 to 9. Construction was so intense that by 1920, despite a few changes from schedule, most lines had been completed. The shield method of construction was rejected in favor of the cut-and-cover method in order to speed up work. Bienvenüe, a highly regarded engineer, designed a special procedure of building the tunnels to allow the swift repaving of roads, and is credited with a largely swift and relatively uneventful construction through the difficult and heterogeneous soils and rocks.

Line 1 and Line 4 were conceived as central east–west and north–south lines. Two lines, ligne 2 Nord (Line 2 North) and ligne 2 Sud (Line 2 South), were also planned but Line 2 South was merged with Line 5 in 1906. Line 3 was an additional east–west line to the north of line 1 and line 5 an additional north to south line to the east of Line 4. Line 6 would run from Nation to Place d'Italie. Lines 7, 8 and 9 would connect commercial and office districts around the Opéra to residential areas in the north-east and the south-west. Bienvenüe also planned a circular line, the ligne circulaire intérieure, to connect the six mainline stations. A section opened in 1923 between Invalides and the Boulevard Saint-Germain before the plan was abandoned.

=== Nord-Sud competing network ===
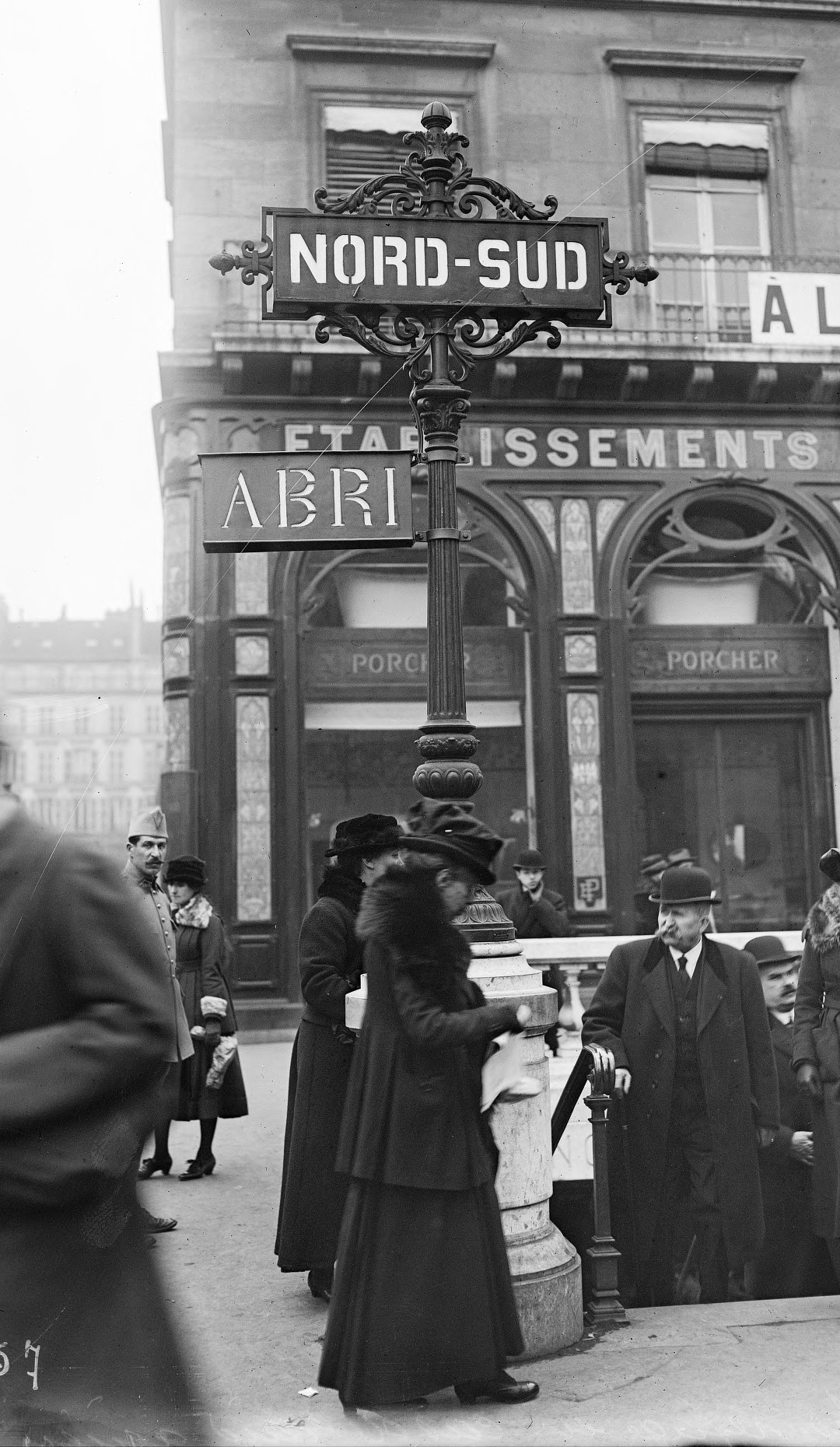
A Nord-Sud station sign

On 31 January 1904, a second concession was granted to the Société du chemin de fer électrique souterrain Nord-Sud de Paris (Paris North-South underground electrical railway company), abbreviated to the Nord-Sud (North-South) company. It was responsible for building three proposed lines:

- Line A would join Montmartre to Montparnasse as an additional north–south line to the west of Line 4.
- Line B would serve the north-west of Paris by connecting Saint-Lazare station to Porte de Clichy and Porte de Saint-Ouen.
- Line C would serve the south-west by connecting Montparnasse station to Porte de Vanves. The aim was to connect Line B with Line C, but the CMP renamed Line B as Line 13 and Line C as Line 14. Both were since conjoined by the RATP as the current Line 13.

Line A was inaugurated on 4 November 1910, after being postponed because of floods in January that year. Line B was inaugurated on 26 February 1911. Because of the high construction costs, the construction of line C was postponed. Nord-Sud and CMP used compatible trains that could be used on both networks, but CMP trains used 600 volts third rail, and NS −600 volts overhead wire and +600 volts third rail. This was necessary because of steep gradients on NS lines. NS distinguished itself from its competitor with the high-quality decoration of its stations, the trains' extreme comfort and pretty lighting.

Nord-Sud did not become profitable and bankruptcy became unavoidable. By the end of 1930, the CMP bought Nord-Sud. Line A became Line 12 and Line B Line 13. Line C was built and renamed Line 14, then was reorganised in 1937 alongside Lines 8 and 10. This former line 14 is now the southern part of Line 13.

The last Nord-Sud train set was decommissioned on 15 May 1972.

=== 1930–1950: first inner suburbs are reached ===
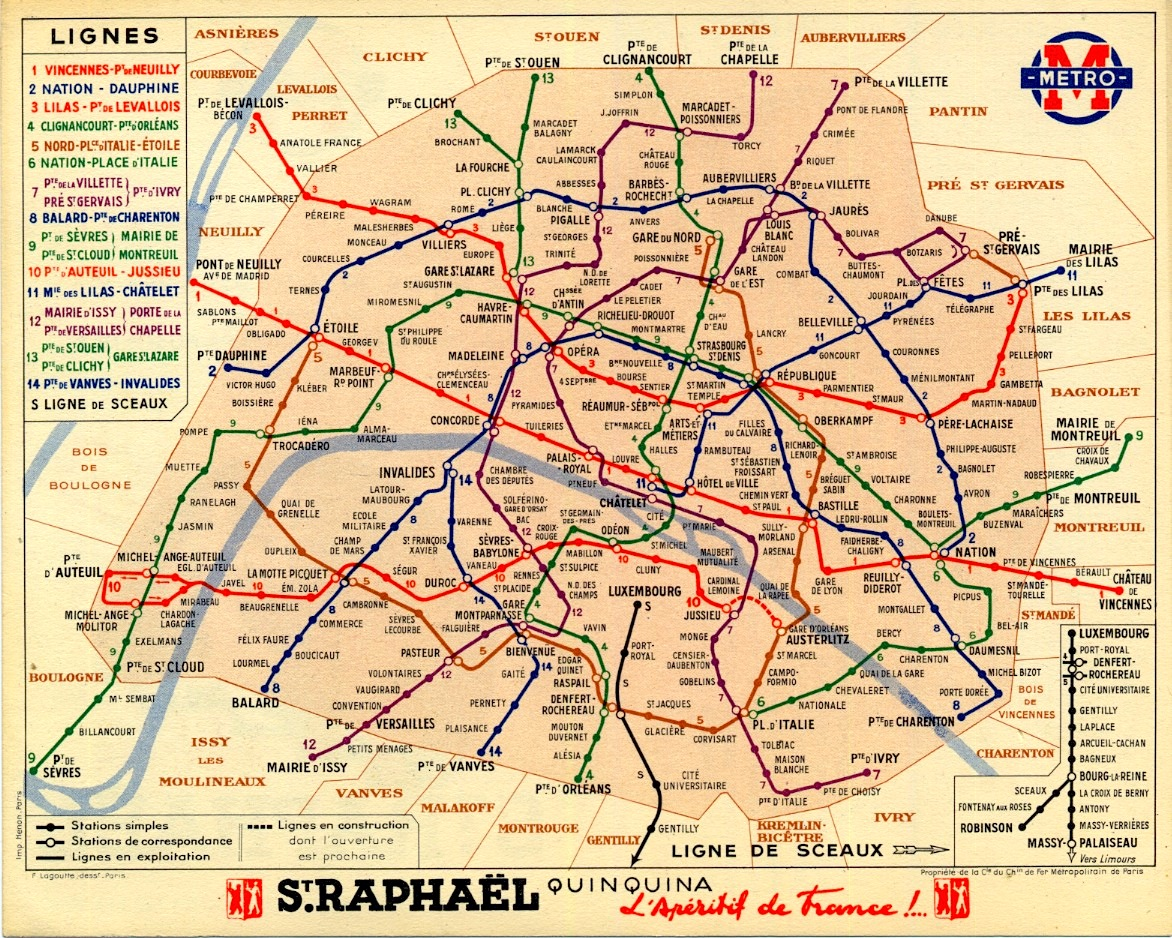
Paris Metro network in 1939

Bienvenüe's project was nearly completed during the 1920s. Paris planned three new lines and extensions of most lines to the inner suburbs, despite the reluctance of Parisians. Bienvenüe's inner circular line having been abandoned, the already-built portion between Duroc and Odéon for the creation of a new east–west line that became Line 10, extended west to Porte de Saint-Cloud and the inner suburbs of Boulogne.

The line C planned by Nord-Sud between Montparnasse station and Porte de Vanves was built as Line 14 (different from present Line 14). It extended north in encompassing the already-built portion between Invalides and Duroc, initially planned as part of the inner circular. The saturated Belleville funicular tramway would be replaced by a new line, Line 11, extended to Châtelet. Lines 10, 11 and 14 were thus the three new lines envisaged under this plan.

Most lines would eventually be extended to the inner suburbs. The first to leave the city proper was Line 9, extended in 1934 to Boulogne-Billancourt; followed by Lines 12 south and 1 east in 1934. World War II forced authorities to abandon projects such as the extension of Lines 4 and 12 to the northern suburbs. By 1949, eight lines had been extended: Line 1 to Neuilly-sur-Seine, Line 3 to Levallois-Perret, Line 5 to Pantin, Line 7 to Ivry-sur-Seine, Line 8 to Charenton, Line 9 to Boulogne-Billancourt, Line 11 to Les Lilas and Line 12 to Issy-les-Moulineaux.

World War II had a massive impact on the Metro. Services were limited and many stations closed. The risk of bombing meant the service between Place d'Italie and Étoile was transferred from Line 5 to Line 6, so that most of the elevated portions of the Metro would be on Line 6. As a result, Lines 2 and 6 now form a circle. Most stations were too shallow to be used as bomb shelters. The French Resistance used the tunnels to conduct swift assaults throughout Paris.

It took a long time to recover after liberation in 1944. Many stations, such as Liège, had not reopened by the 1960s while some others, such as Champ de Mars and Saint-Martin, never reopened. On 23 March 1948, the CMP (the underground) and the STCRP (bus and tramways) merged to form the RATP, still running the Metro and most of Paris's public transportation services today.

=== 1960–1990: development of the RER ===
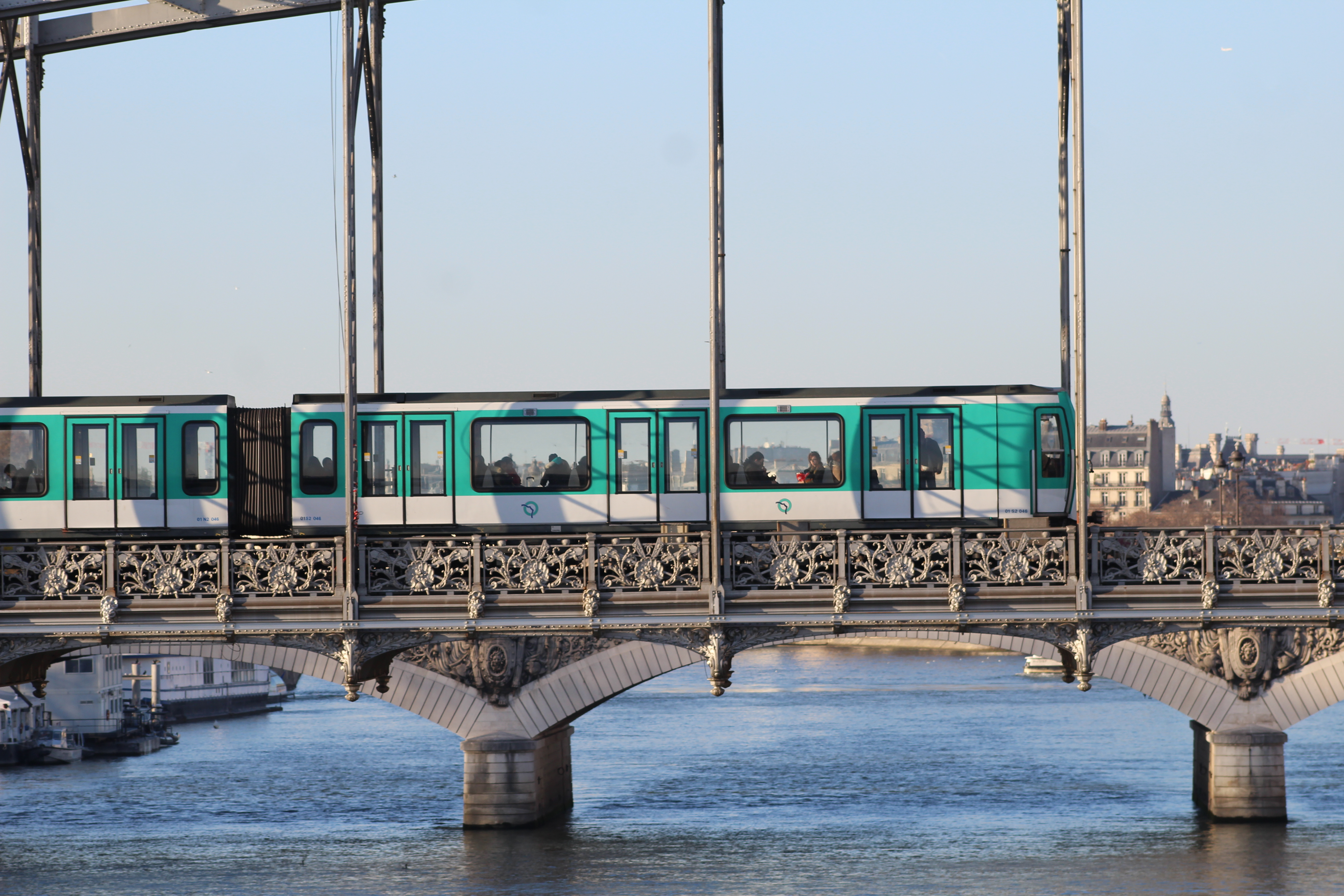
The Viaduc d'Austerlitz, crossing the Seine, is used by Line 5

The network became saturated during the 1950s. Outdated technology limited the number of trains, which led the RATP to stop extending lines and concentrate on modernisation. The MP 51 prototype was built, testing both rubber-tyred metro and basic automatic driving on the voie navette. The first replacements of the older Sprague trains began with experimental articulated trains and then with mainstream rubber-tyred Metro MP 55 and MP 59, some of the latter having only retired in 2025. Thanks to newer trains and better signalling, trains ran more frequently.

The population boomed from 1950 to 1980. Car ownership became more common and suburbs grew further from the centre of Paris. The main railway stations, termini of the suburban rail lines, were overcrowded during rush hour. The short distance between Metro stations slowed the network and made it unprofitable to build extensions. The solution in the 1960s was to revive a project abandoned at the end of the 19th century: joining suburban lines together through new express underground portions in the city centre : the Réseau Express Régional (regional express network; RER).

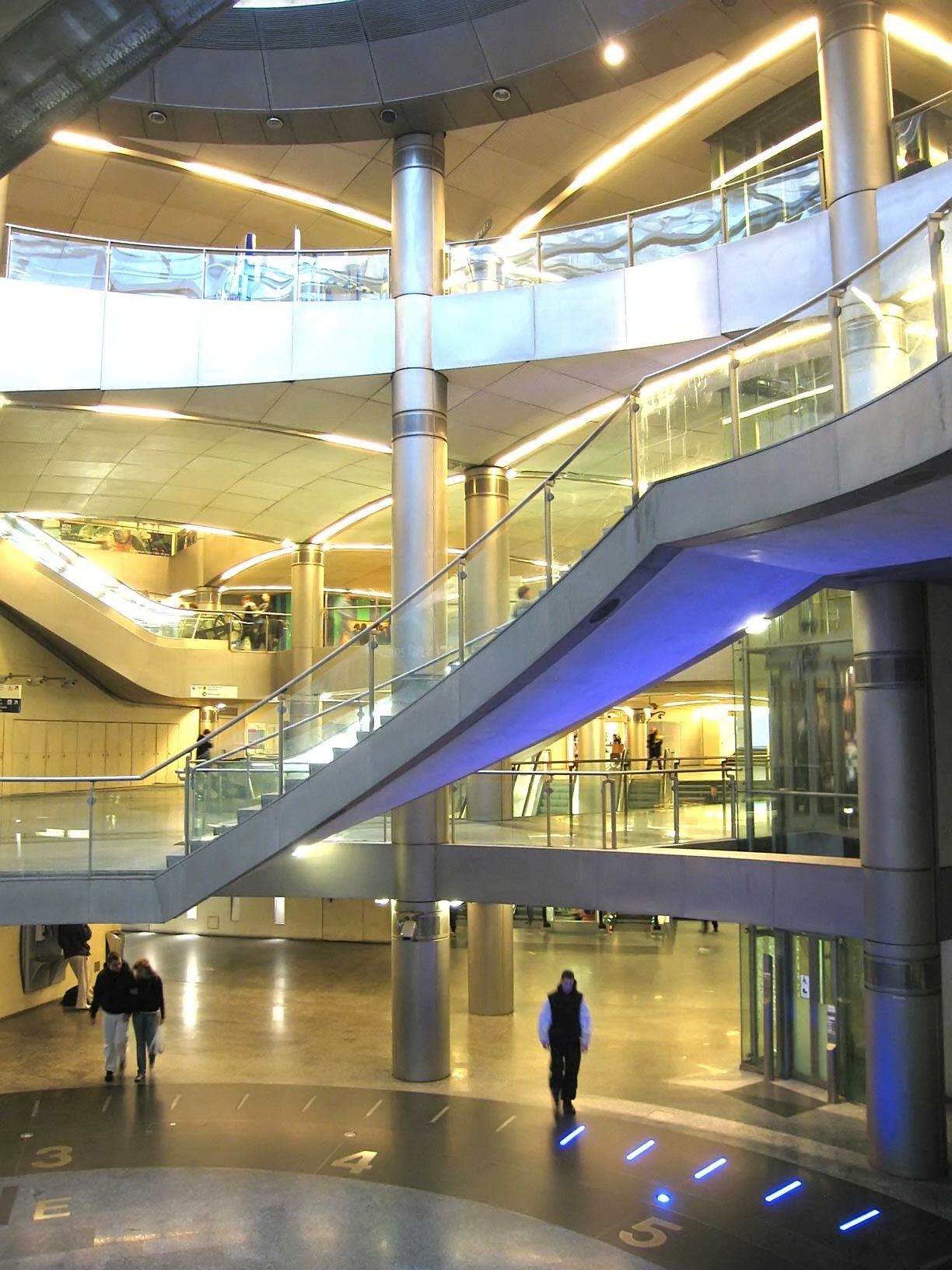
Saint-Lazare station, modernized at the arrival of Line 14 during the 2000s.

The RER plan initially included one east–west line and two north–south lines. RATP bought two unprofitable SNCF lines—the Ligne de Saint-Germain (westbound) and the Ligne de Vincennes (eastbound) with the intention of joining them and to serve multiple districts of central Paris with new underground stations. The new line created by this merger became Line A. The Ligne de Sceaux, which served the southern suburbs and was bought by the CMP in the 1930s, would be extended north to merge with a line of the SNCF and reach the new Charles de Gaulle Airport in Roissy. This became Line B. These new lines were inaugurated in 1977 and their wild success outperformed the most optimistic forecasts, so much so that RER line A is the most used urban rail line in Europe with nearly 300 million journeys a year.

Because of the enormous cost of these two lines, the third planned line was abandoned and the authorities decided that later developments of the RER network would be more cheaply developed by the SNCF, alongside its continued management of other suburban lines. However, the RER developed by the SNCF would never match the success of the RATP's two RER lines. In 1979, the SNCF developed Line C by joining the suburban lines of the Gare d'Austerlitz and Gare d'Orsay, the latter being converted into a museum dedicated to impressionist paintings. During the 1980s, it developed Line D, which was the second line planned by the initial RER schedule, but serving Châtelet instead of République to reduce costs. A huge Metro-RER hub was created at Châtelet–Les Halles, becoming one of the world's largest underground stations.

The same project of the 1960s also decided to merge subway Lines 13 and 14 to create a quick connection between Saint-Lazare and Montparnasse as a new north–south line. Distances between stations on the lengthened line 13 differ from that on other lines in order to make it more "express" and hence to extend it farther in the suburbs. The new Line 13 was inaugurated on 9 November 1976.

=== 1990–2010: Eole and Météor ===
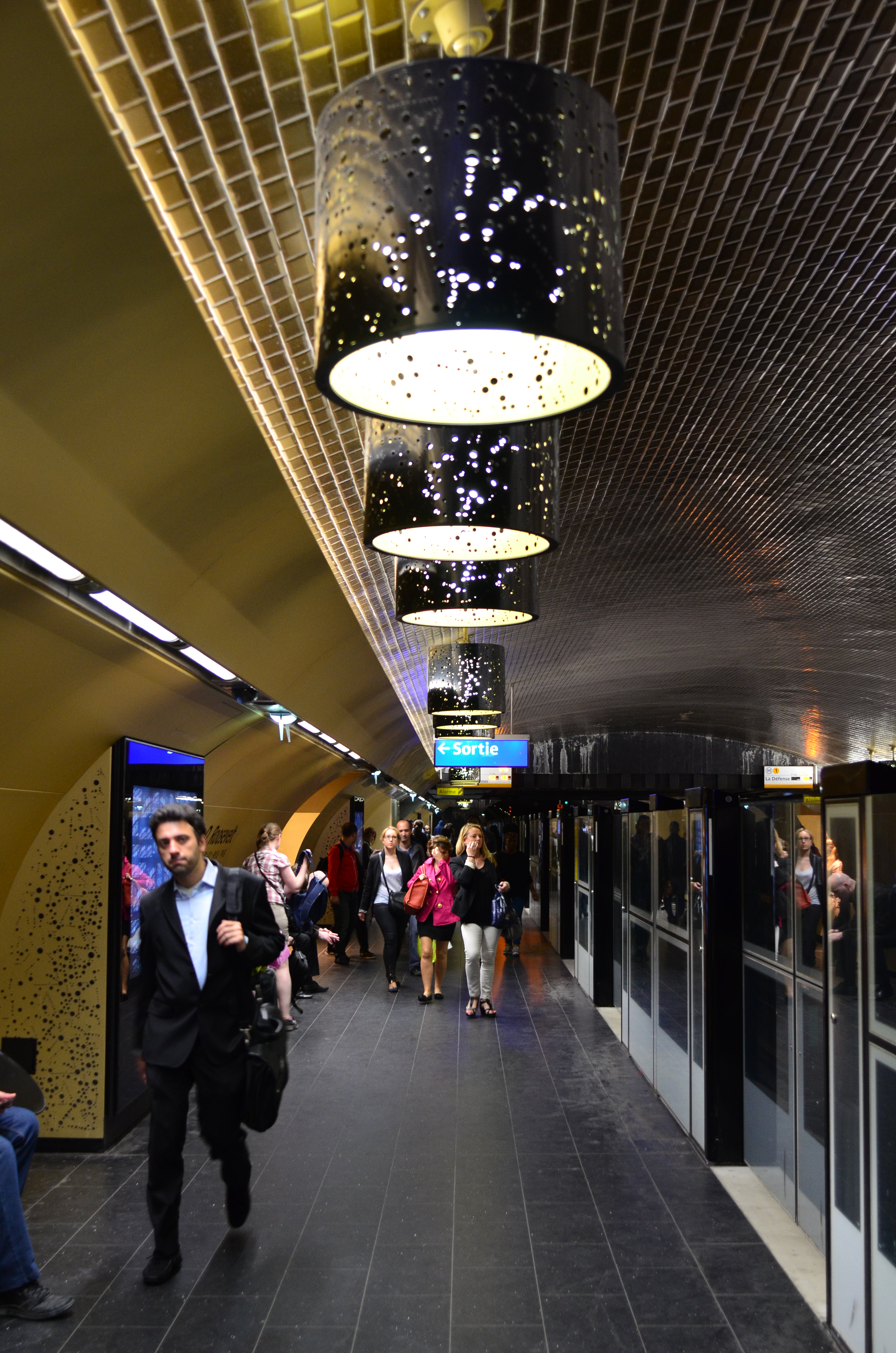
Franklin D. Roosevelt station on Line 1, refurbished in the late 2000s

In October 1998, the current day Line 14 was inaugurated on its central trunk (from Saint-Lazare to Bibliothèque François Mitterrand stations). It was the first fully new Metro line in 63 years. Known during its conception as Météor (MÉTro Est-Ouest Rapide), it was the first of the now three fully automatic lines within the network, along with Lines 1 and 4. It was also the first line of the Parisian network to feature platform screen doors on every station on opening day to prevent suicides and accidents. It was conceived with suburban extension in mind, similar to the Line 13 extensions built during the 1970s. As a result, most of the stations are at least a kilometre apart. Like the RER lines designed by the RATP, nearly all stations offer connections with multiple Metro lines.

Lines 13 and 7 are the only two on the network to be split in branches. Hoping to get rid of those saturated branches and thus improve the network's efficiency, RATP had initially planned to attribute to line 14 one branch of each line (most probably the Asnières-Gennevilliers and Villejuif branches), then extend them both further into the suburbs. This project was abandoned due to the cost of modernizing the allotted branches. In 1999, the RER Line E was inaugurated. Known during its conception as Eole (Est-Ouest Liaison Express), it is the fifth RER line. Originally terminating at Haussmann–Saint-Lazare station, it was extended west in early 2025 towards Nanterre, through the La Défense business district, with an extension west through "stealing" the Mantes-la-Jolie branch of Transilien line J, in mind and on papers.

=== 2010 and beyond: automation ===
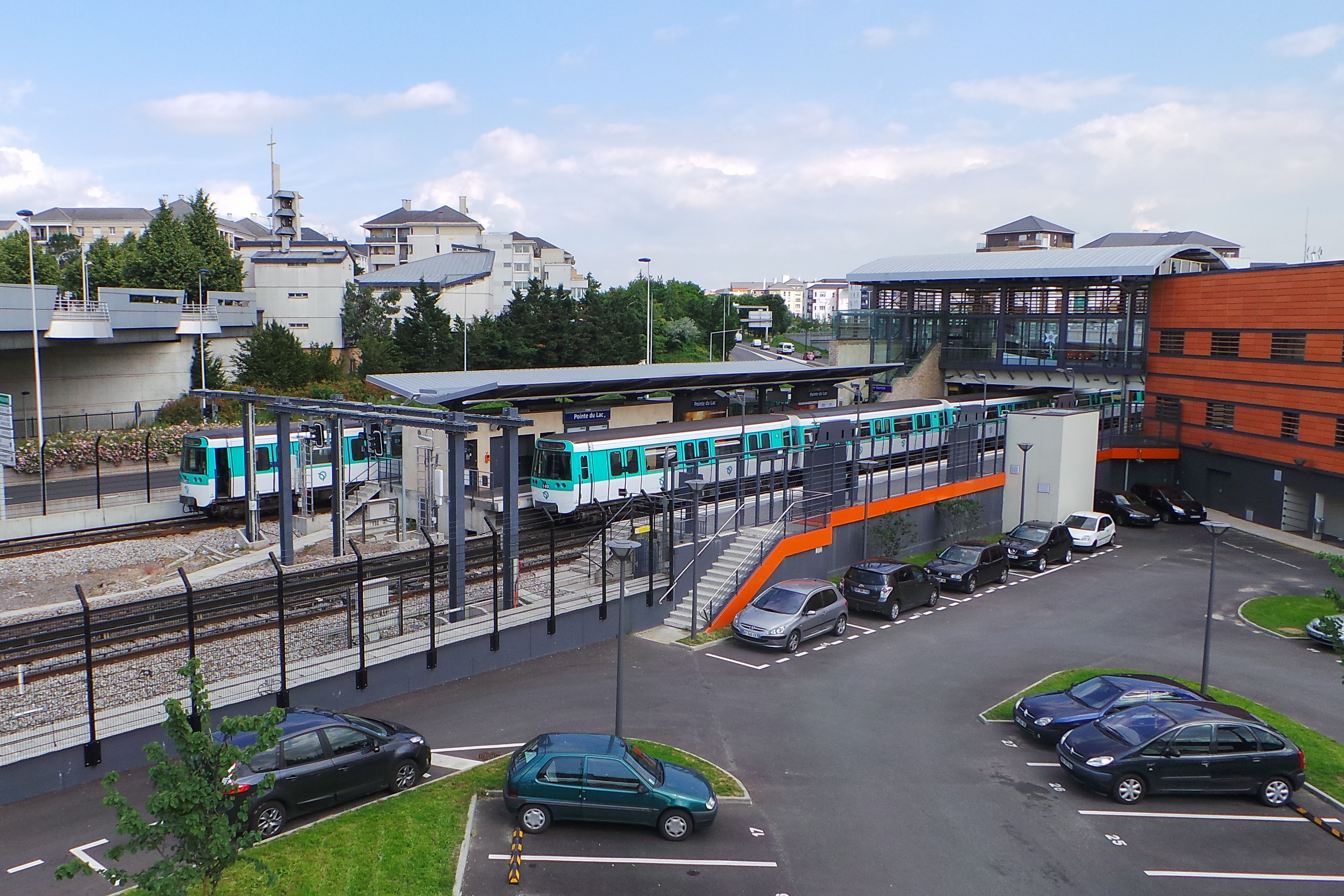
Pointe du Lac station, opened in 2011

Between 2007 and November 2011, Line 1 was converted to driverless operation. The line was operated with a combination of driver-operated trains and driverless trains until the last driverless MP 05 train joined in February 2013. The same conversion for Line 4 was completed on 13 January 2022, with the last non-automatic train removed from that line to Line 6 on 17 December 2023, with plans to automate Line 13. Line 14 was automated from Day 1, as will the upcoming lines 15 to 18 part of the Grand Paris Express.

Several of the historic lines were extended through the suburbs since 2010 :

- Line 8 was extended one station southeast to Pointe du Lac in 2011,
- Line 12 was extended one station northeast to Aubervilliers in 2012, then two more stations further northeast in 2022.
- Line 4 was extended to Mairie de Montrouge in 2013 then to Bagneux–Lucie Aubrac station in 2022,
- Line 14 was extended by 5.8 km (3.6 mi) northbound to Mairie de Saint-Ouen in December 2020 then Saint-Denis–Pleyel station in 2024, before opening a 14 km expansion southbound towards the Orly Airport in 2024.
- Line 11 was extended 6 km east to Rosny–Bois-Perrier station in 2024, marking the first extension on this line for over a century.

=== Accidents and incidents ===
- 10 August 1903: the Couronnes Disaster (fire caused by short circuit), 84 killed. Use of steel for train carriages made mandatory as a result.
- 8 February 1962: Charonne subway massacre, a case of police brutality committed by the French police, 9 killed.
- July – October 1995: Paris Metro bombings (terror attack), committed by Algerian extremists – 8 killed and more than 100 injured.
- 30 August 2000: an MF 67 train derailed due to excessive speed and unavailable automatic cruising through the Notre-Dame-de-Lorette hairpin, 24 slightly injured.
- 6 August 2005: fire broke out on a train at Simplon, injuring at least 19 people. Early reports blamed an electrical short-circuit as the cause.
- 29 July 2007: a fire started on a train between Varenne and Invalides. Fifteen people were injured.
- 2 December 2016: an MF01 train derailed outside of Barbès-Rochechouart station on line 2. No casualties were reported.
- 17 September 2019: an MP 05 train skipped three stations from Concorde to Franklin D. Roosevelt. It finally came to a stop at George V station. Even though nobody was hurt, several passengers were terrified. A bang was also reported to be heard at Palais Royal-Musée du Louvre station.
- 14 June 2023: five trains on Line 4 were shut down. An operational incident on one train is believed to be the cause. Passengers opened the doors and walked along the rails to the nearest station. The evacuation of the blocked trains ended at 9:30 p.m. This incident sparked numerous reactions on social networks, particularly Twitter, where several stranded users expressed their dissatisfaction due to the lack of rapid intervention by the RATP agents and the temperature approaching 35 °C. Traffic resumed around 10:15 p.m. with heavy disruptance. The RATP announced the opening of an internal investigation.

== Network ==
Since the Metro was built to comprehensively serve the city inside its walls, the stations are very close: 548 metres (1,798 ft) apart on average, from 424 metres (1,391 ft) on historical Line 4 to 1,158 metres (3,799 ft) on the modern line 14, meaning Paris is densely networked with stations. The surrounding suburbs are served by later line extensions, forcing all Metro traffic from one suburb to another to pass through the city (the circular line 15, now under construction, will enable non-radial journeys through Paris). The slow average speed effectively prohibits service to the greater Paris area.

The Metro is mostly underground (225.2 km or 139.9 mi of 245.6 km or 152.6 mi). Above-ground sections consist of elevated railway viaducts within Paris (on Lines 1, 2, 5 and 6) and the at-level suburban ends of Lines 5, 8, and 13. The tunnels are relatively close to the surface due to the variable nature of the terrain, which complicates deep digging; exceptions include parts of Line 12 under the hill of Montmartre and line 2 under Ménilmontant. The tunnels mostly follow the twists and turns of the streets above. During construction in 1900, a minimum curvature radius of 75 metres (246 ft) was imposed, but even this low standard was not adhered to at Bastille and Notre-Dame-de-Lorette.

Like the New York City Subway, and in contrast with the London Underground, the Paris Metro mostly uses two-way tunnels. As in most French metro and tramway systems, trains drive on the right, while SNCF trains run on the left. The tracks are 1,435 mm (4 ft 8 1/2 in) standard gauge. Electric power is supplied by a third rail which carries 750 volts DC.

The width of the carriages, 2.4 metres (7 ft 10 in), is narrower than that of newer French systems (such as the 2.9-metre or 9-foot-6-inch carriages in Lyon). Trains on Lines 1, 4 and 14 have capacities of 600–700 passengers, compared with the 2,600 riders capacity on the Altéo MI 2N trains of RER A. The City of Paris deliberately chose to build narrow Metro tunnels to prevent the running of mainline trains, as the city of Paris and the French state had historically poor relations. In contrast to many other historical metro systems (such as New York, Madrid, London, and Boston), all lines have tunnels and operate trains with the same dimensions. Five Paris Metro Lines (1, 4, 6, 11 and 14) run on a rubber tire system developed by the RATP in the 1950s, and since exported to the Montreal, Santiago, Mexico City and Lausanne metro networks.

The number of cars of each train varies line by line. The shortest are lines 3bis and 7bis with three-car trains. Line 11 ran with four until the summer 2024 when four-car MP 59 trains, the oldest type in service at the time, were gradually replaced by new five-car MP 14 trains. Lines 1 and 4 run six-car trains. Line 14 runs 8-car trains. All other lines run with five. Two lines, 7 and 13, have branches at the end, and Line 10 has a one-way loop. Trains serve every station on each line except when these are closed for renovations.

=== Map ===
Paris Metro map (July 2024)

=== Opening hours ===
The first train leaves each terminus at 5:30 a.m. On some lines additional trains start from an intermediate station. The last train, often called the "balai" (broom) because it sweeps up remaining passengers, arrives at the terminus at 1:15 a.m., except on Fridays (since 7 December 2007), Saturdays and on nights before a holiday, when the service ends at 2:15 a.m.

On New Year's Eve, Fête de la Musique, Nuit Blanche and other events, some stations on Lines 1, 4, 6, 9 and 14 remain open all night.

=== Fares ===
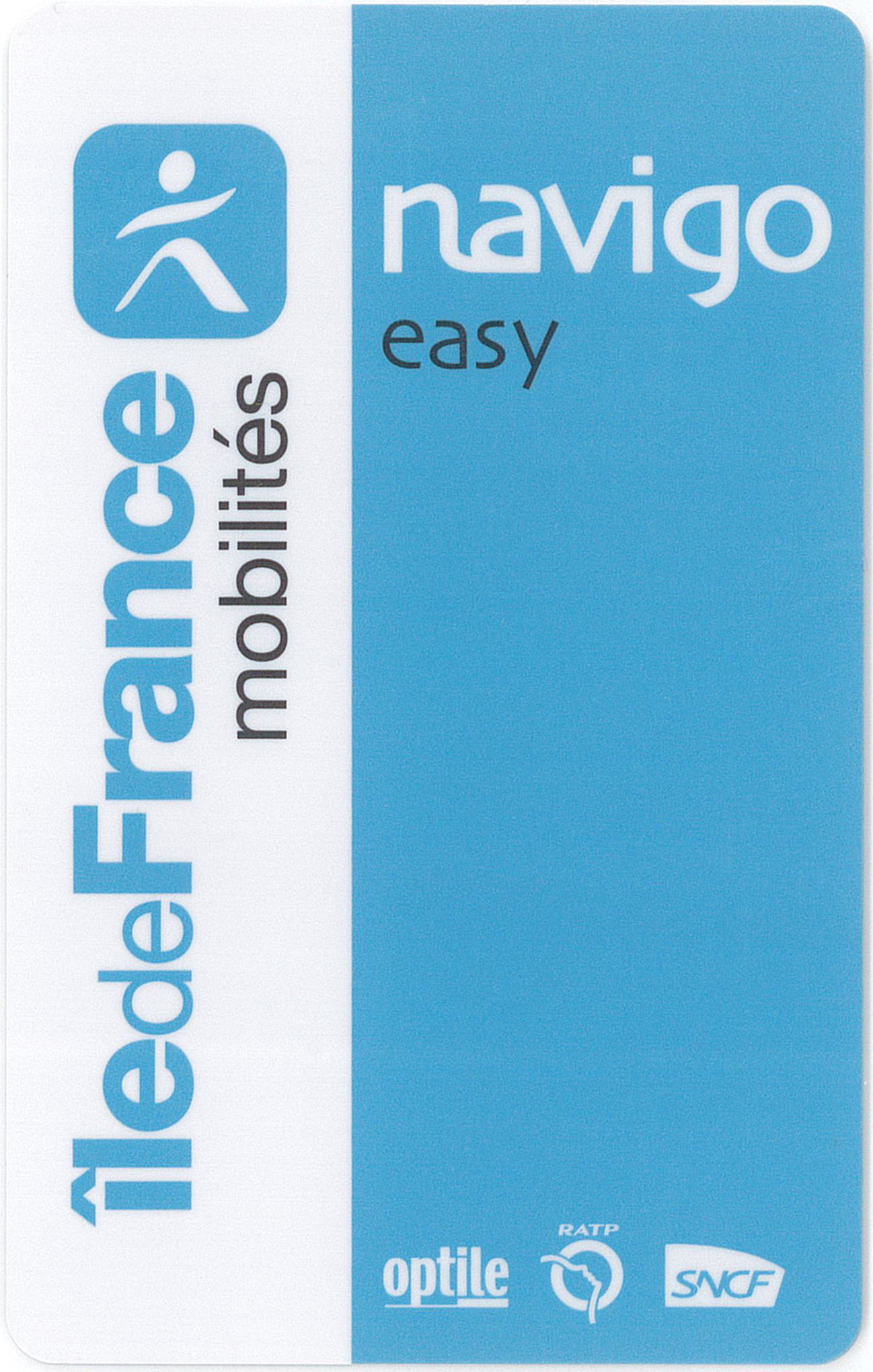
Navigo Easy

Fares are sold on smartphones, at automated machines, and at staffed counters. Single use tickets and multiple use passes are available. A fare sold on a smartphone can be validated by holding it directly over an automated gate reader.

=== Facilities ===
On 26 June 2012, it was announced that the Metro would get Wi-Fi in most stations. Access provided would be free, with a premium paid alternative offer proposed for a faster internet connection. As of 2020, the entire RATP network was connected with 4G service, including within tunnels. The automated Line 1, Line 4 and Line 14 – as well as some congested stations on Line 13 – have platform edge doors (portes palières) separating the tracks from the platform.

==== Accessibility ====
Largely because most of its stations were built well before accessibility became a consideration, less than 10 per cent of Paris's metro system is wheelchair accessible ranking it as worst metro system in the world for accessibility. The 20 stations of Line 14 (which first opened in 1998) are fully accessible, and all line extensions since 1992 have included lifts at the new stations. From 2022 to 2025, 23 new stations on the Metro will be accessible, following extensions to existing lines. The four new lines of the Grand Paris Express, which are expected to start opening in 2026, will also be fully accessible.

The Law on Equal Rights and Opportunities, Participation and Citizenship of Persons with Disabilities of 2005 does not require the Metro to be made accessible. RATP estimates that retrofitting the network would cost between 4 and 6 billion euros, and considers several stations impossible to retrofit, leaving them as-is. As of 2022, there were no plans to retrofit existing stations with lifts. RATP notes that buses and trams in Paris are fully accessible, and many RER & Transilien stations are accessible.

== Technical specifications ==
The Metro has 245.6 kilometres (152.6 mi) of track and 321 stations, 61 connecting between lines. These figures do not include the RER network. The average distance between stations is 562 m (1,844 ft), a number bound to rise as the lines 15 to 18 are set to open. Trains stop at all open stations on their way, without jumps. Lines do not share tracks, including at transfer stations, where different platforms are used for each line.

As of 2018, trains had a maximum permitted speed of 70 km/h (43 mph) and their commercial speed averaged 25.1 km/h (15.6 mph) at peak times. The fastest lines were the automated ones: Line 14, which averaged 38.9 km/h (24.2 mph), and Line 1, which averaged 30 km/h (19 mph). Trains travel on the right. The track is standard gauge but the loading gauge is smaller than the mainline SNCF network. Power is from a lateral third rail, 750 V DC, except on the rubber-tyred lines where the current comes from guide bars.

The loading gauge is small compared to those of newer metro systems (but comparable to that of early European metros), with capacities of between about 560 and 720 passengers per train on Lines 1–14. Many other metro systems (such as those of New York and London) adopted expanded tunnel dimensions for their newer lines (or used tunnels of multiple sizes almost from the outset, in the case of Boston), at the cost of operating incompatible fleets of rolling stock. Paris built all lines to the same dimensions as its original lines. Before the introduction of rubber-tire lines in the 1950s, this common shared size theoretically allowed any Metro rolling stock to operate on any line, but in practice each line was assigned a regular roster of trains.

A feature is the use of rubber-tired trains on five lines: this technique was developed by RATP and entered service in 1951. The technology was exported to many networks around the world (including Montreal, Mexico City and Santiago). Lines 1, 4, 6, 11 and 14 have special adaptations to accommodate rubber-tyred trains. Trains are composed of 3 to 8 cars depending on the line, the most common being 5 cars, but all trains on the same line have the same number of cars.

The Metro is designed to provide local, point-to-point service in Paris proper, as well as service to Paris from its close suburbs. Stations within Paris are very close together to form a grid structure, ensuring that every point in the city is close to a Metro station (less than 500 metres or 1,640 feet), at the cost of speed, except on Line 14 where the stations are farther apart and the trains travel faster. The system is complemented by the RER, which extends farther out into the suburbs and functions as an express network for the city and its surroundings.

The Paris Metro runs mostly underground; surface sections include sections on viaducts in Paris (Lines 1, 2, 5, and 6) and at the surface in the suburbs (Lines 1, 5, 8, and 13). In most cases, both tracks are laid in a single tunnel. Almost all lines follow roads, having been built by the cut-and-cover method near the surface (the earliest by hand). Line 1 follows the straight course of the Champs-Elysées Avenue, while some stations (Liège, Commerce) have platforms that do not align: the street above is too narrow to fit both platforms opposite each other. Many lines have very sharp curves. The specifications established in 1900 required a very low minimum curve radius by railway standards, but even this was often not fully respected, for example near Bastille on line 1, the Porte Dauphine turnaround track on line 2 and Notre Dame de Lorette's hairpin on line 12. Parts of the network are built at depth, in particular a section of Line 12 under Montmartre, the sections under the Seine, and all of Line 14.

Lines 7 and 13 have forks serving two terminal branches on one side, while line 7bis — itself born from a fork split on the other side of line 7 — runs in a unidirectional loop at its eastern end. One end of lines 2 and 5 each, as well as both ends of line 6, have their terminus station on a balloon loop. One end of lines 3bis and 7bis each have their trains reverse in the station itself. One end of lines 2, 3bis, and 4 have trains run out of service at one side of a balloon loop before reentering service on the other. All other RATP termini have trains continue a certain distance beyond the terminal, before reversing back to the station on a different platform headed the other way.

== Rolling stock ==
The rolling stock has steel wheels (MF for matériel fer) and rubber-tyred trains (MP for matériel pneu). The different versions of each kind are specified by year of design. Some trains have suffixes to differentiate between them – CC (Conduite Conducteur) for trains driven by a driver and CA (Conduite Automatique) for trains that are automatically driven.

Steel-wheeled rolling stock

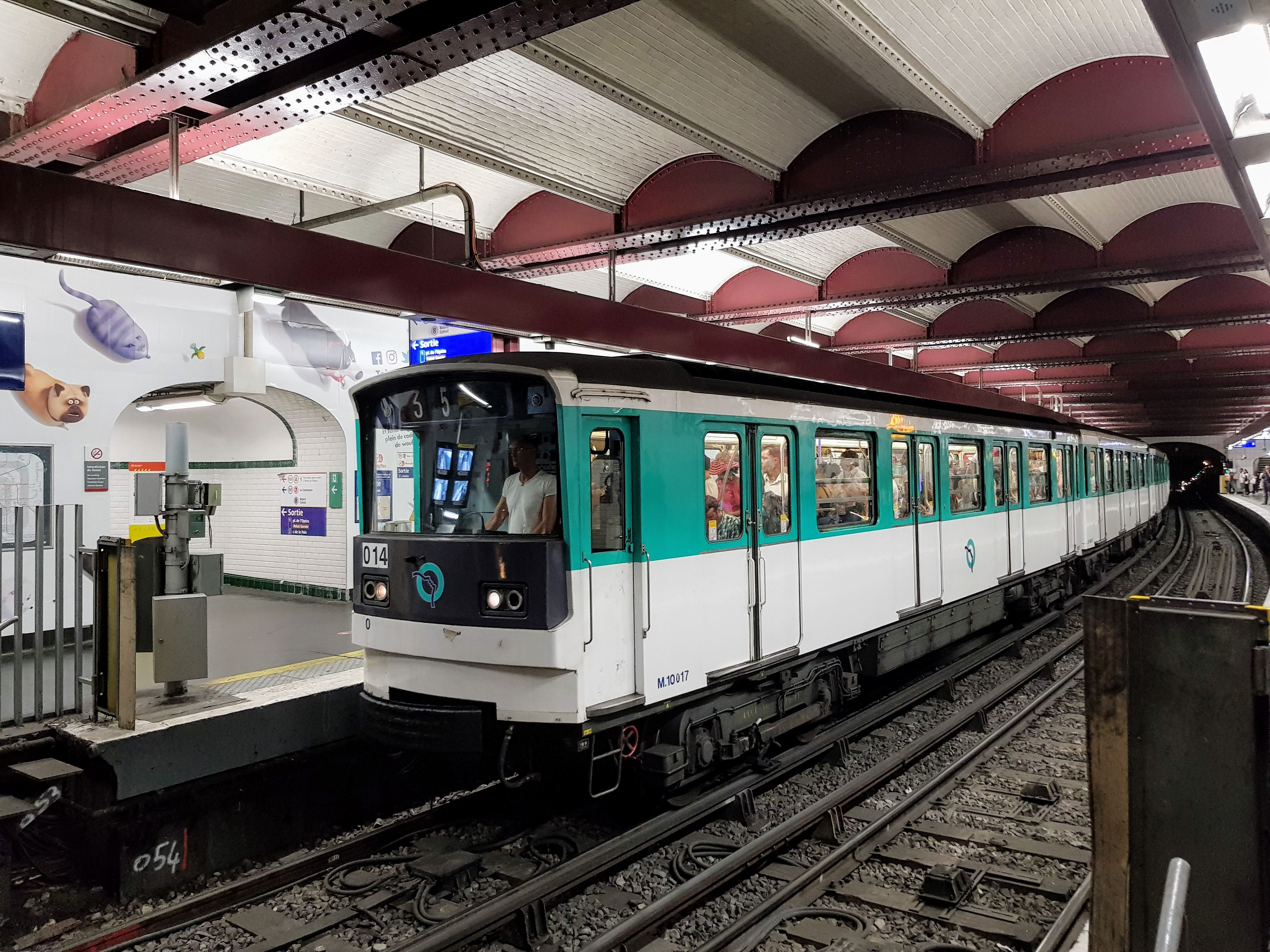
MF 67

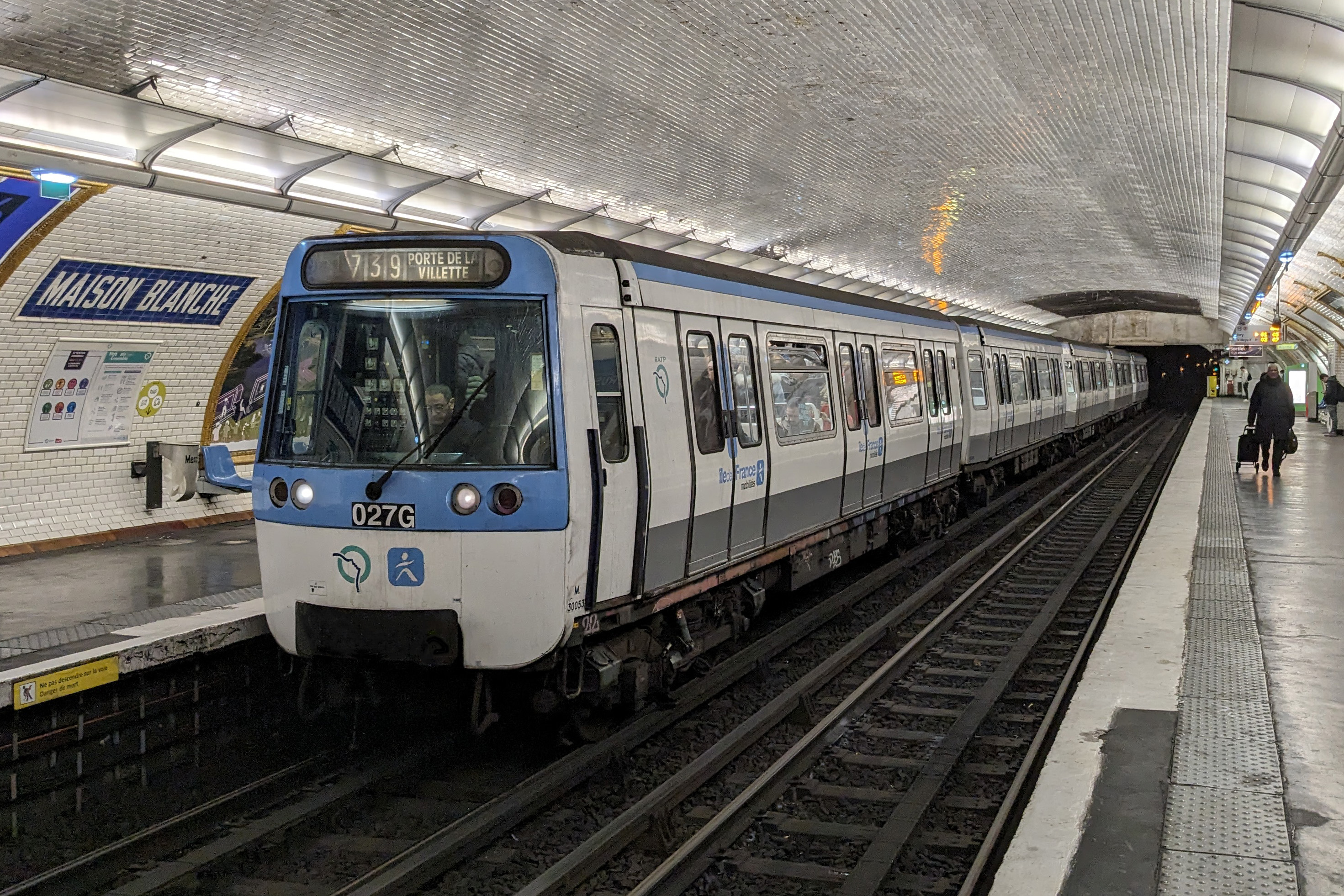
MF 77

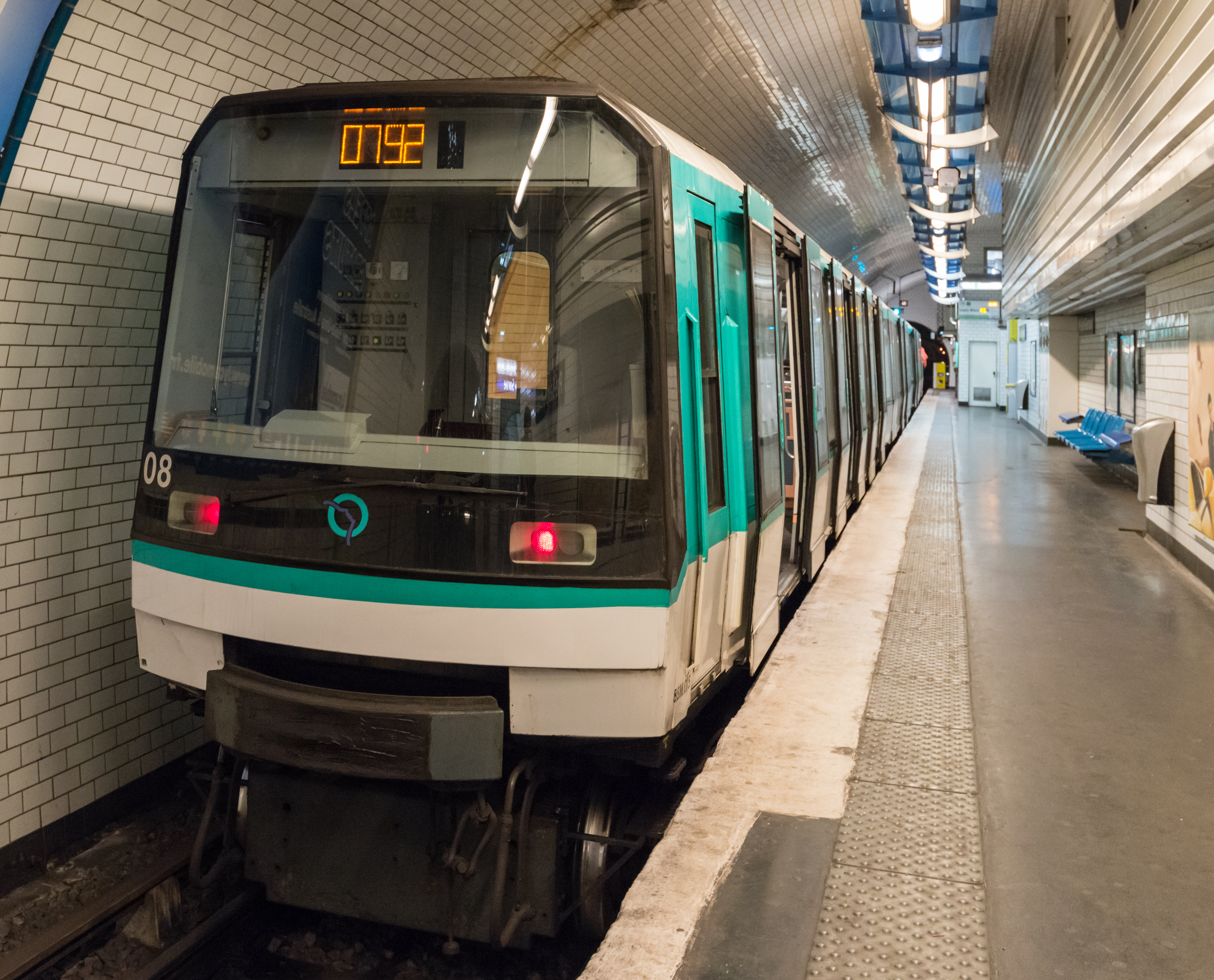
MF 88

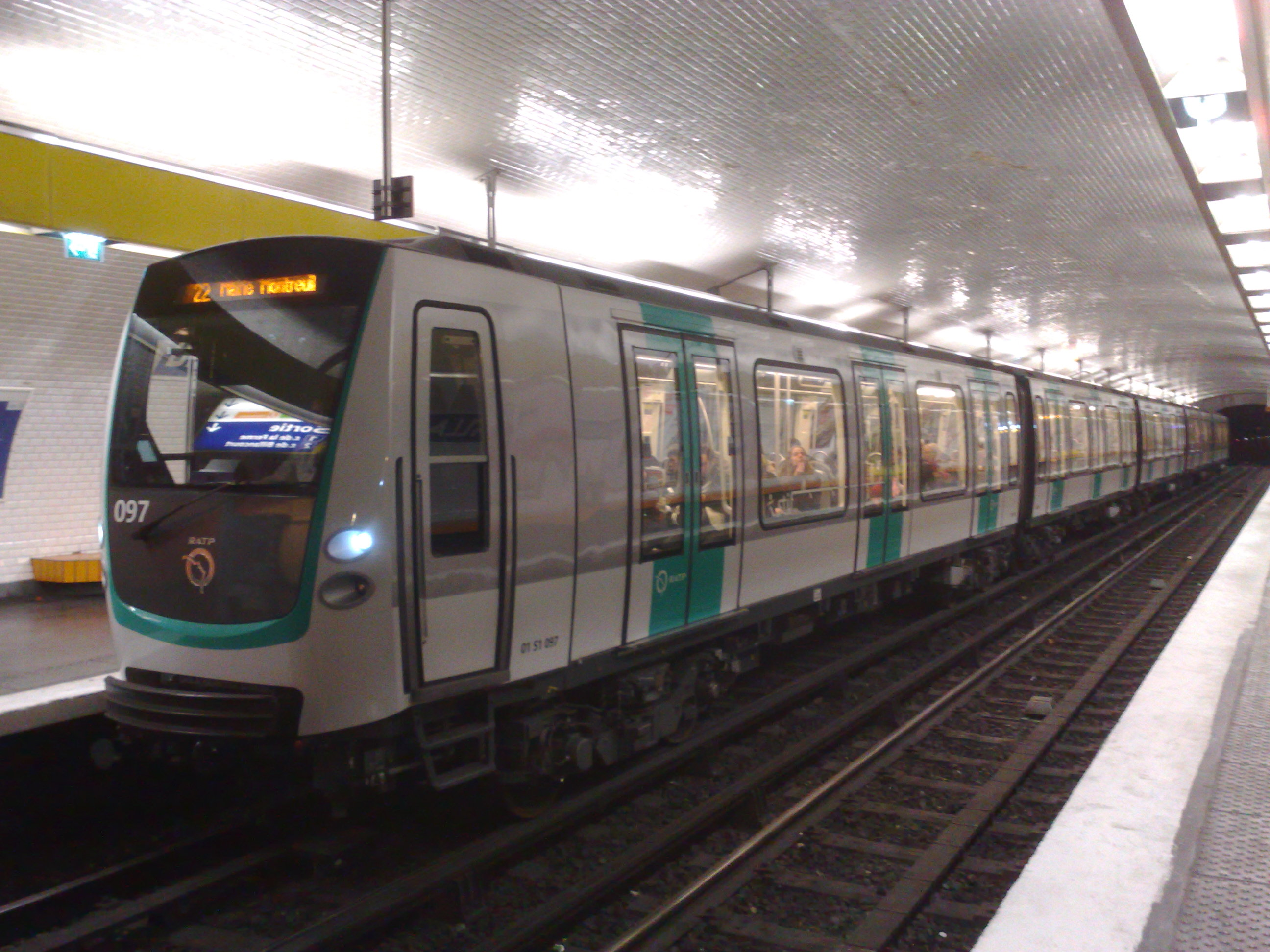
MF 2000/MF 01

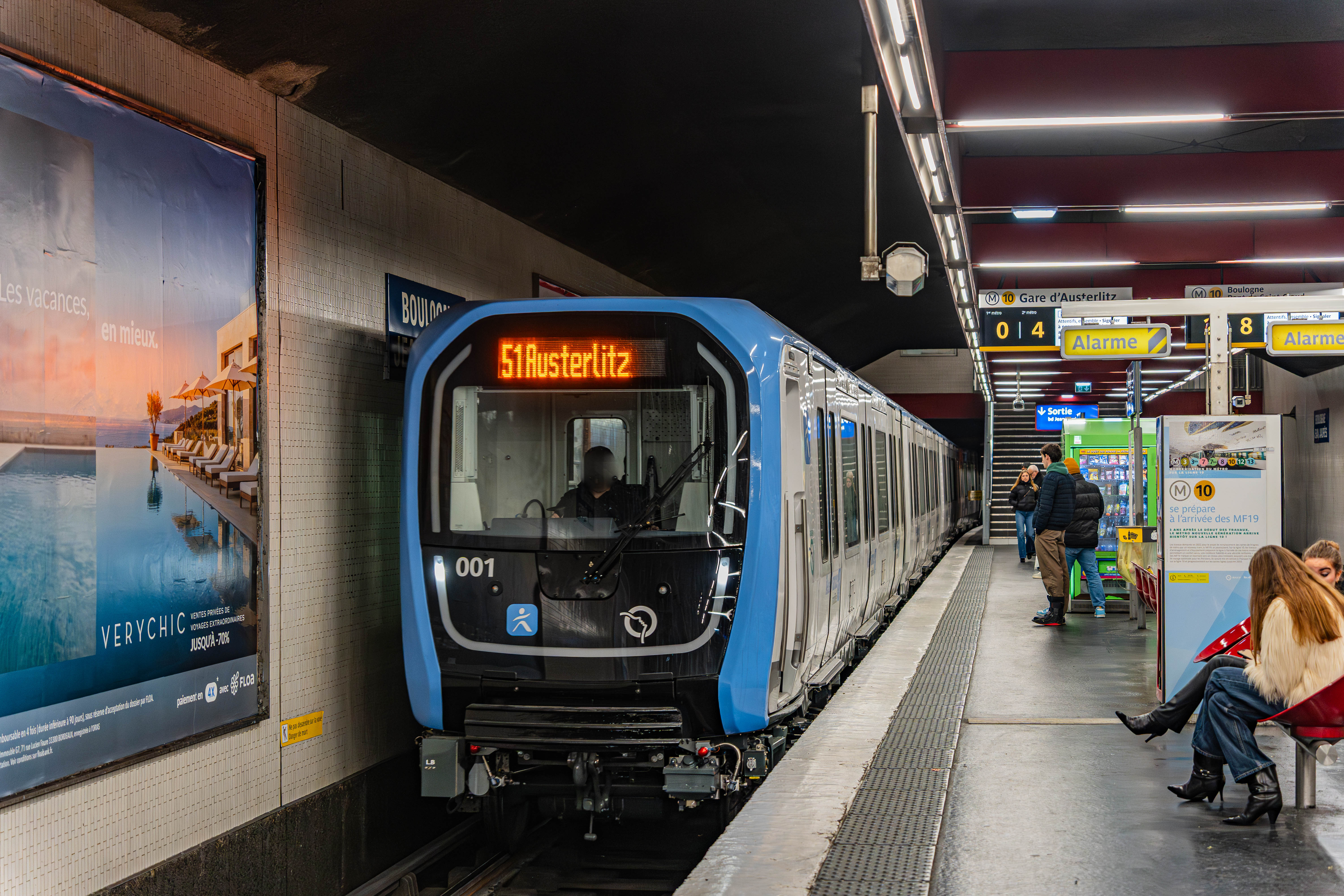
MF 19
Rubber-tyred rolling stock

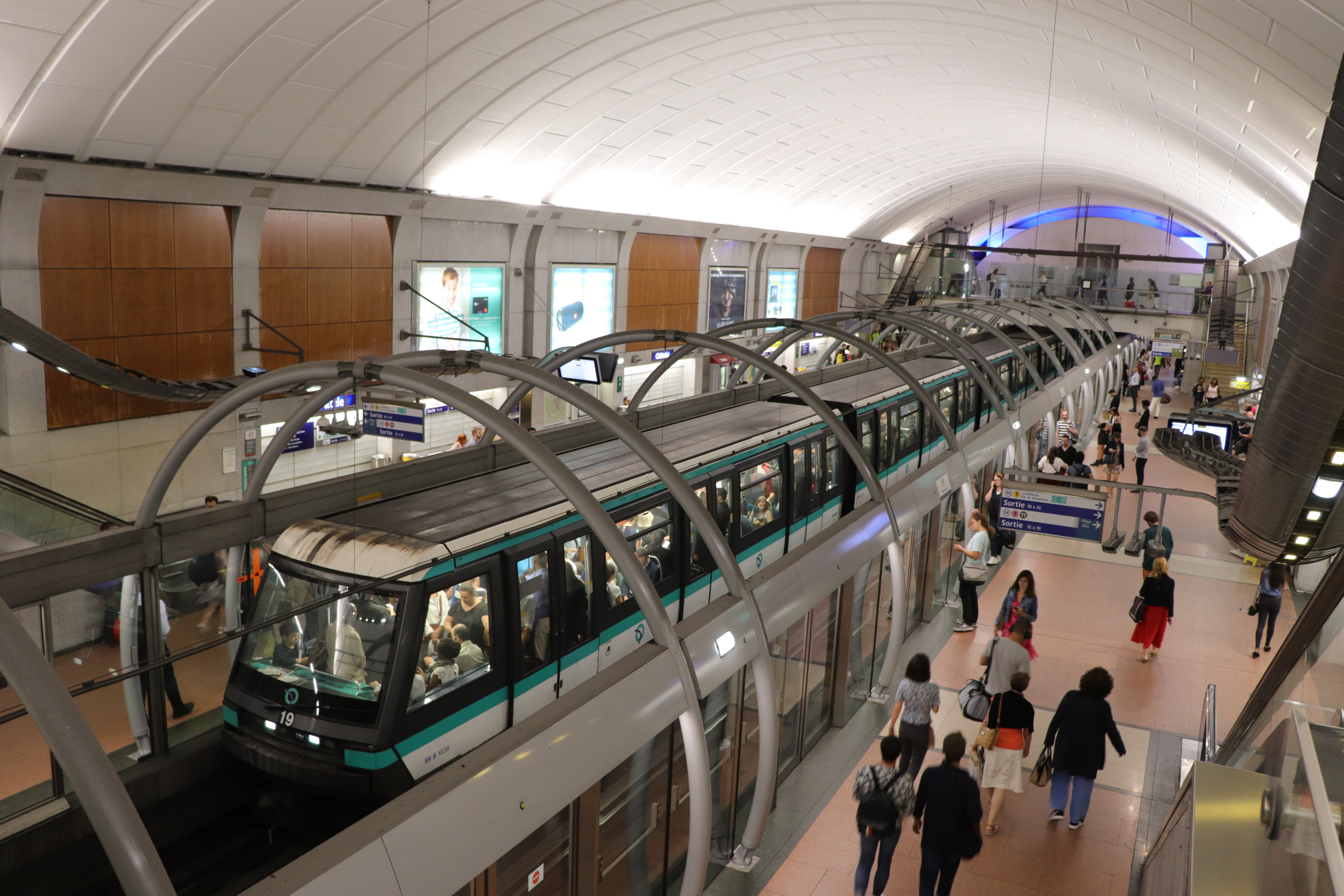
MP 89 CA

MP 89 CC

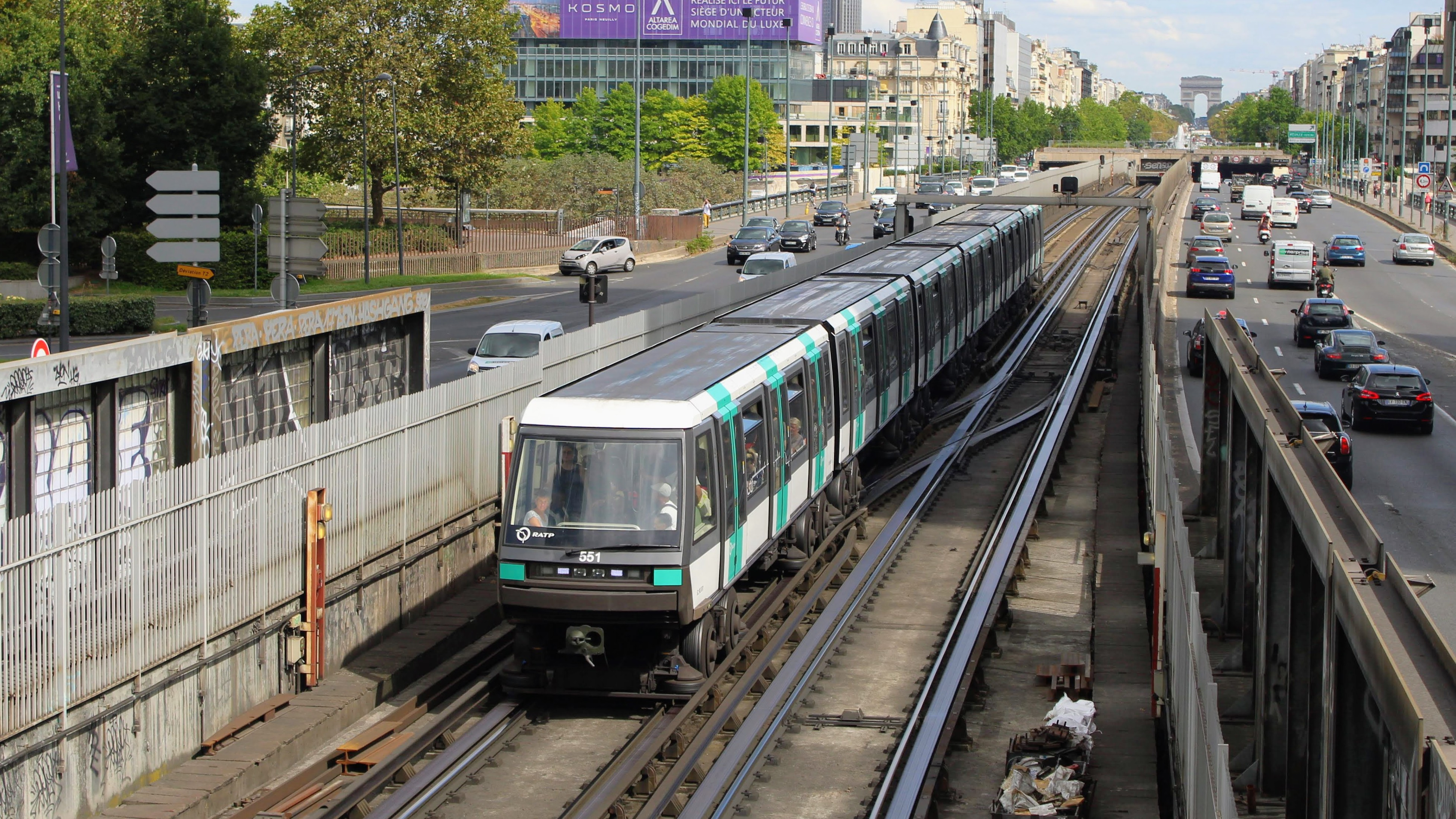
MP 05

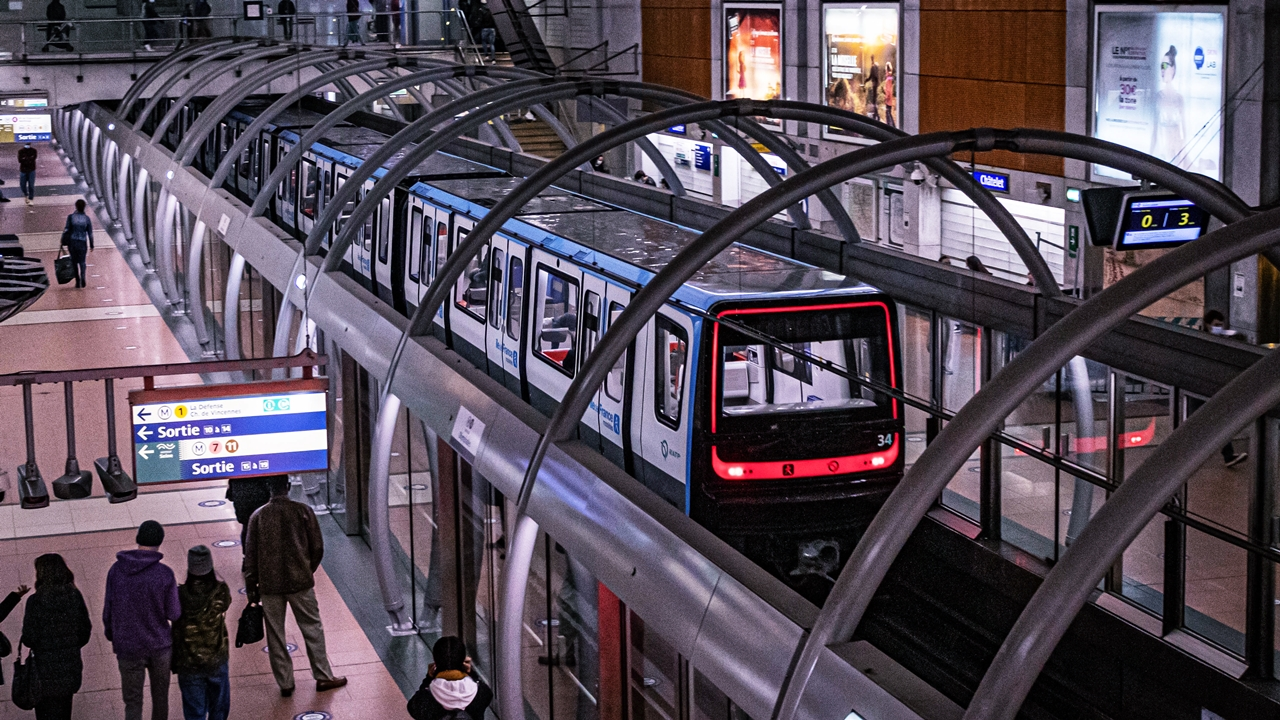
MP 14 CA

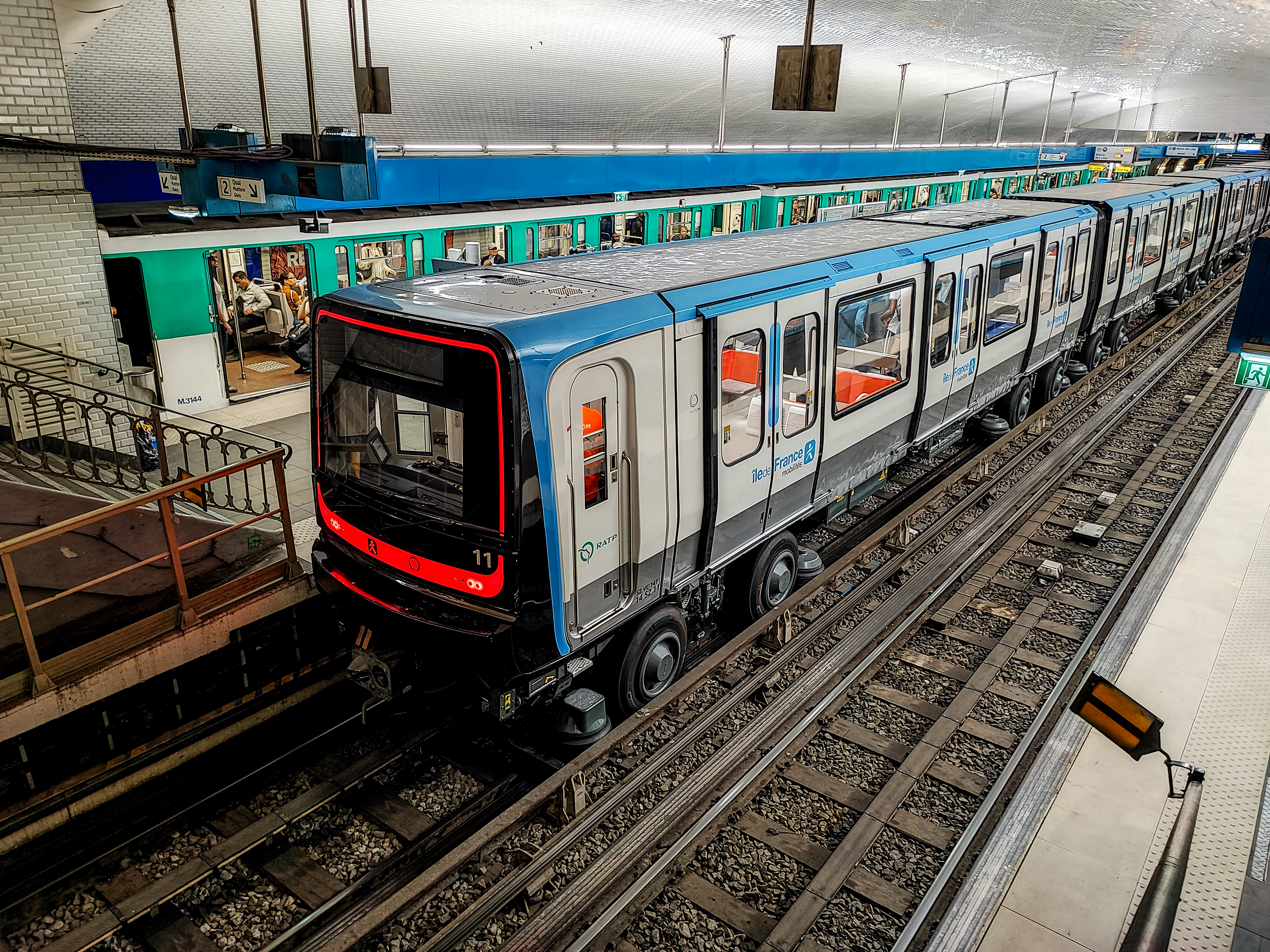
MP 14 CC

All of these are arranged in order of inauguration, from left to right.

- No longer in service
  - M1: in service from 1900 until 1931.
  - Sprague-Thomson: in service from 1908 until 1983.
  - MA 51: in service on lines 10 and 13 until 1994.
  - MP 55: in service on Line 11 from 1956 until 1999, replaced by the MP 59.
  - MP 59: in service from 1963 until 2024, replaced by the MP 14.
  - MP 73: in service from 1974 to 2026, replaced by the MP 89 CC.
  - Zébulon: a prototype MF 67 used for training operators between 1968 and 2010. It never saw passenger service.
- Not yet in service
  - MR3V/MR6V: intended to serve on lines 15 (MR6V), 16 and 17 (MR3V).
  - MRV: intended to serve on line 18.

== Lines ==
Paris Metro lines in operation
Line		Opened	Last extension	Stations served	Length	Average interstation	Journeys made (2025)	Termini	Rolling stock	Wheel Type	Conduction system
Paris Metro Line 1	Line 1	1900	1992	25	16.6 km (10.3 mi)	692 metres (2,270 ft)	169 million	La Défense; Château de Vincennes	MP 05	Rubber	Automatic (SAET)
Paris Metro Line 2	Line 2	1900	1903	25	12.4 km (7.7 mi)	517 metres (1,696 ft)	92 million	Porte Dauphine; Nation	MF 01	Steel	Conductor (PA)
Paris Metro Line 3	Line 3	1904	1971	25	11.7 km (7.3 mi)	488 metres (1,601 ft)	82 million	Pont de Levallois–Bécon; Gallieni	MF 67	Steel	Conductor (OCTYS)
Paris Metro Line 3bis	Line 3bis	1971	—N/a	4	1.3 km (0.81 mi)	433 metres (1,421 ft)	82 million	Porte des Lilas; Gambetta	MF 67	Steel	Conductor
Paris Metro Line 4	Line 4	1908	2022	29	14.0 km (8.7 mi)	500 metres (1,600 ft)	167 million	Porte de Clignancourt; Bagneux–Lucie Aubrac	MP 89 CA; MP 05; MP 14 CA	Rubber	Automatic (SAET)
Paris Metro Line 5	Line 5	1906	1985	22	14.6 km (9.1 mi)	695 metres (2,280 ft)	105 million	Bobigny–Pablo Picasso; Place d'Italie	MF 01	Steel	Conductor
Paris Metro Line 6	Line 6	1909	1942	28	13.6 km (8.5 mi)	504 metres (1,654 ft)	100 million	Charles de Gaulle–Étoile; Nation	MP 89 CC	Rubber	Conductor
Paris Metro Line 7	Line 7	1910	1987	38	22.5 km (14.0 mi)	608 metres (1,995 ft)	122 million	La Courneuve–8 mai 1945; Villejuif–Louis Aragon; Mairie d'Ivry	MF 77	Steel	Conductor
Paris Metro Line 7bis	Line 7bis	1967	—N/a	8	3.1 km (1.9 mi)	443 metres (1,453 ft)	122 million	Louis Blanc; Pré-Saint-Gervais	MF 88	Steel	Conductor
Paris Metro Line 8	Line 8	1913	2011	38	23.4 km (14.5 mi)	632 metres (2,073 ft)	106 million	Balard; Pointe du Lac	MF 77	Steel	Conductor
Paris Metro Line 9	Line 9	1922	1937	37	19.6 km (12.2 mi)	544 metres (1,785 ft)	129 million	Pont de Sèvres; Mairie de Montreuil	MF 01	Steel	Conductor
Paris Metro Line 10	Line 10	1923	1981	23	11.7 km (7.3 mi)	532 metres (1,745 ft)	44 million	Boulogne–Pont de Saint-Cloud; Gare d'Austerlitz	MF 67; MF 19	Steel	Conductor
Paris Metro Line 11	Line 11	1935	2024	19	11.7 km (7.3 mi)	650 metres (2,130 ft)	52 million	Châtelet; Rosny–Bois-Perrier	MP 14 CC	Rubber	Conductor
Paris Metro Line 12	Line 12	1910	2022	31	17.2 km (10.7 mi)	573 metres (1,880 ft)	84 million	Mairie d'Aubervilliers; Mairie d'Issy	MF 67	Steel	Conductor (PA)
Paris Metro Line 13	Line 13	1911	2008	32	24.4 km (15.2 mi)	787 metres (2,582 ft)	118 million	Châtillon–Montrouge; Saint-Denis-Université; Les Courtilles	MF 77	Steel	Conductor (OURAGAN)
Paris Metro Line 14	Line 14	1998	2025	21	27.8 km (17.3 mi)	1,388 metres (4,554 ft)	152 million	Saint-Denis–Pleyel; Aéroport d'Orly	MP 14 CA	Rubber	Automatic (SAET)

=== Lines under construction ===
Paris Metro lines under construction
Line		Planned opening	Planned completion	Stations served	Length	Average interstation	Termini	Rolling stock	Wheel Type	Conduction system
Paris Metro Line 15	Line 15	2027 (south)	2031	36	75 km / 47 miles	2,083 metres (6,834 ft)	Noisy–Champs; Champigny Centre	MR6V	Steel	Automatic
Paris Metro Line 16	Line 16	2028	2029	10	25 km / 16 miles	2,778 metres (9,114 ft)	Noisy–Champs; Saint-Denis–Pleyel	MR3V	Steel	Automatic
Paris Metro Line 17	Line 17	2028	2030	9	25 km / 16 miles	3,125 metres (10,253 ft)	Le Mesnil–Amelot; Saint-Denis–Pleyel	MR3V	Steel	Automatic
Paris Metro Line 18	Line 18	2026	2030	13	50 km / 31 miles	4,167 metres (13,671 ft)	Aéroport d'Orly; Versailles Chantiers	MRV	Steel	Automatic

=== Planned lines ===
Planned Paris Metro lines
Line		Planned opening	Planned completion	Stations served	Length	Average interstation	Termini	Rolling stock	Conduction system
Paris Metro Line 19	Line 19	2040	—N/a	9 to 11	25–30 km / 16–19 miles	2,083 metres (6,834 ft)	Nanterre–La Folie; Aéroport Charles de Gaulle 2 TGV	—N/a	Automatic

== Stations ==
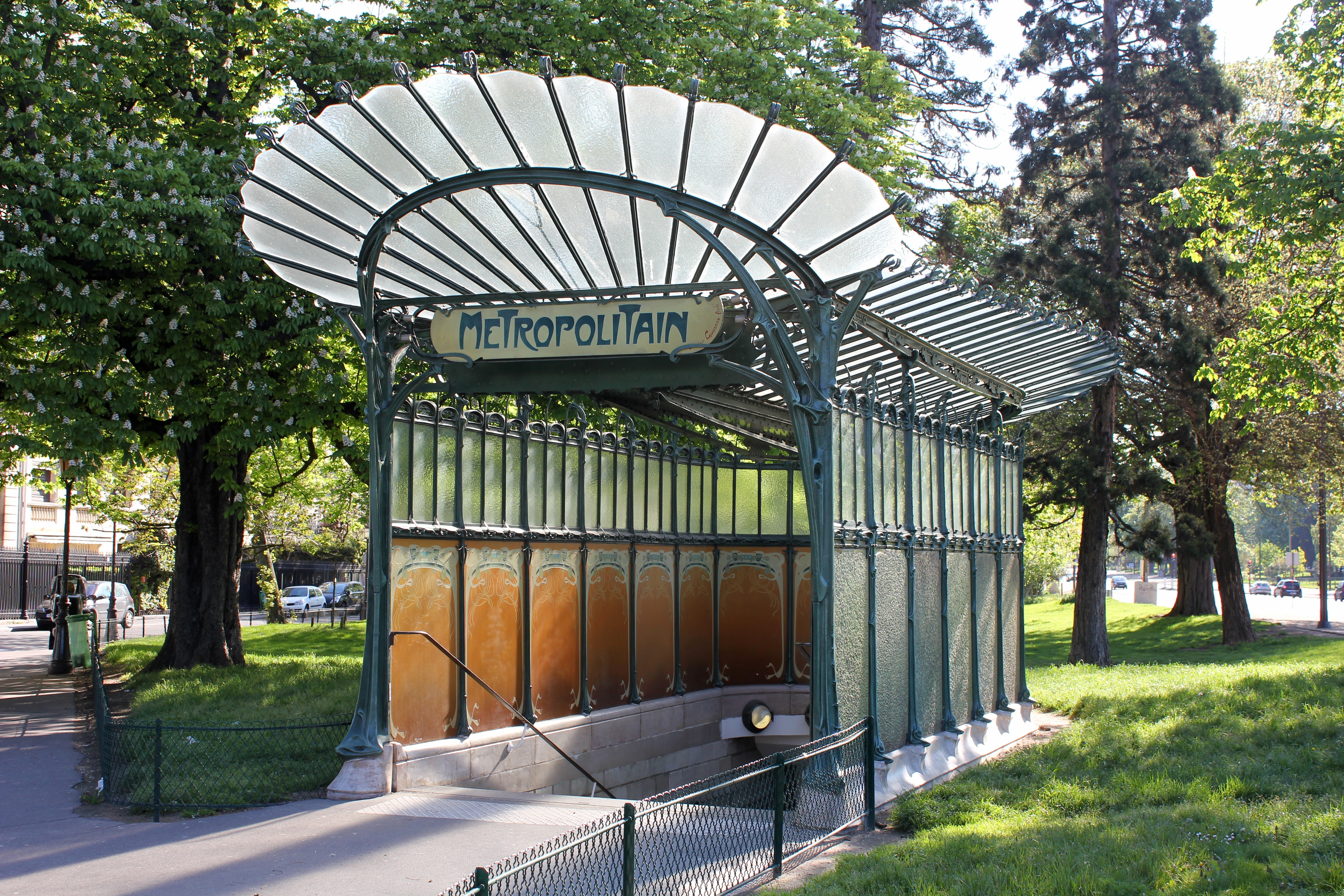
Hector Guimard's original Art Nouveau entrance of the Paris Metro at Porte Dauphine station

The typical station comprises two central tracks flanked by two four-metre wide platforms. About 50 stations, generally current or former termini, are exceptions; most have three tracks and two platforms (Porte d'Orléans), or two tracks and a central platform (Porte Dauphine). Some stations are single-track, either due to difficult terrain (Saint-Georges), a narrow street above (Liège) or track loops (Église d'Auteuil).

Station length was originally 75 m (246 ft), enough to accommodate the 5-car trains used on most lines. This was extended to 90 m (295 ft) on high-traffic lines (Line 1 and Line 4) which operate six-car trains, with some stations at 105 m (344 ft) for accommodating seven-car trains (the difference as yet unused).

In general, stations were built near the surface by the cut-and-cover method, and are vaulted. Stations of the former Nord-Sud network (Line 12 and Line 13) have higher ceilings, due to the former presence of a ceiling catenary. There are exceptions to the rule of near-surface vaulting:

- Stations particularly close to the surface, generally on Line 1 (Champs-Elysées–Clémenceau), have flat metal ceilings.
- Elevated (above street) stations, in particular on Line 2 and Line 6, are built in brick and covered by platform awnings (Line 2) or glass canopies (Line 6).
- Stations on the newest sections (Line 14), built at depth, comprise 120 m (394 ft) platforms for eight-car trains, high ceilings and double-width platforms. Since the trains on this line are driverless, the stations have platform screen doors. Platform screen doors have been introduced on Line 1 and Line 4 as well since the MP 05 trains have been functioning.

Several ghost stations are no longer served by trains. One of the three platforms at Porte des Lilas station is on a currently unused section of track, often used as a backdrop in films.

In 2018, the busiest stations were Saint-Lazare (46.7 million passengers), Gare du Nord (45.8), Gare de Lyon (36.9), Montparnasse – Bienvenüe (30.6), Gare de l'Est (21.4), Bibliothèque François Mitterrand (18.8), République (18.3), Les Halles (17.5), La Défense (16.0) and Bastille (13.2).

=== Interior decoration ===
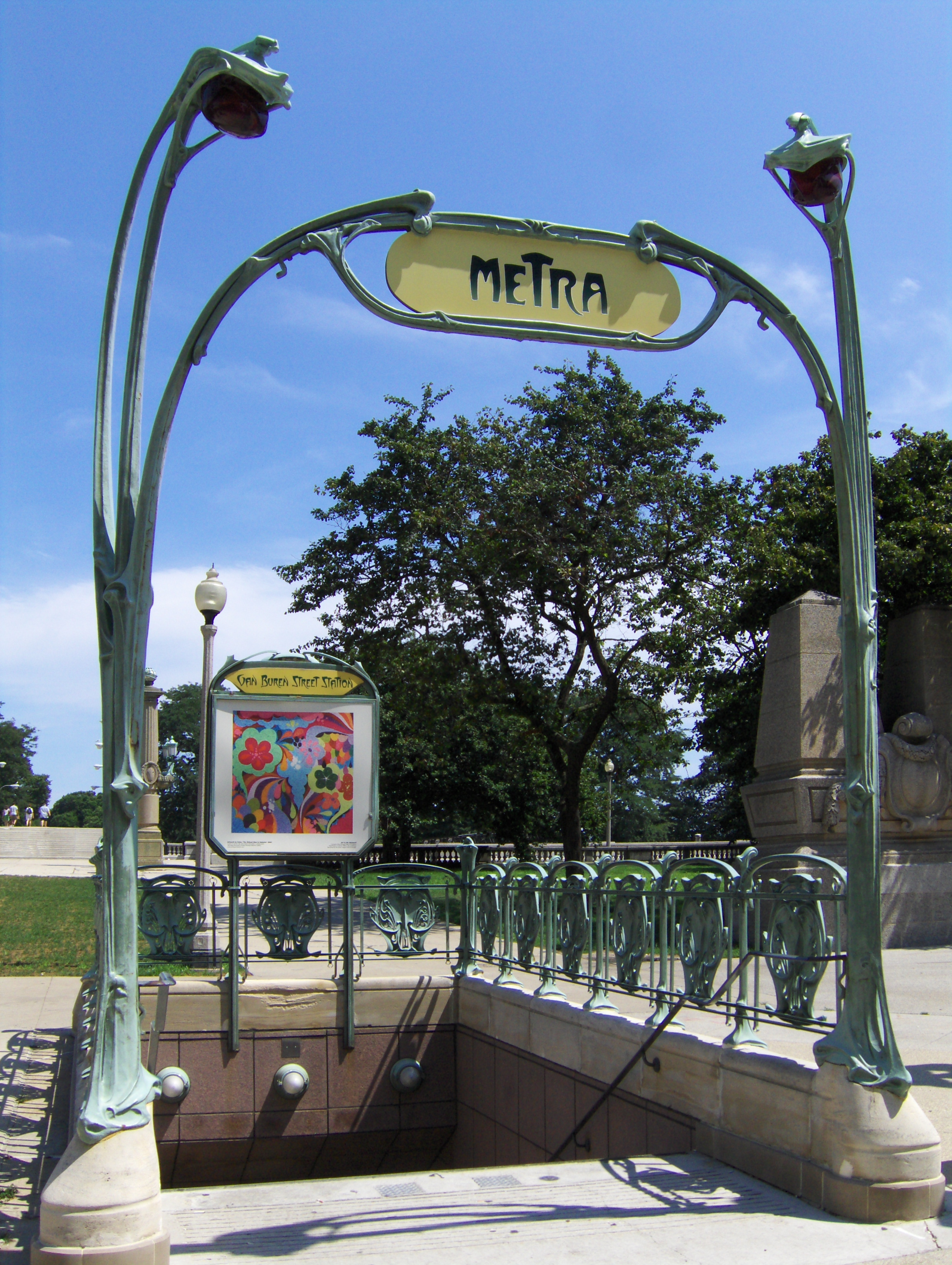
Entrance to a Metra commuter rail station in Chicago, designed in Art Nouveau style as a replica of a Paris Metro station

Concourses are decorated in Art Nouveau style defined at the Metro's opening in 1900. The spirit of this aesthetic has generally been respected in renovations.

Standard vaulted stations are lined by small white earthenware tiles, chosen because of the poor efficiency of early twentieth century electric lighting. From the outset walls have been used for advertising; posters in early stations are framed by coloured tiles with the name of the original operator (CMP or Nord Sud). Stations of the former Nord Sud (most of line 12 and parts of line 13) generally have more meticulous decoration. Station names are usually inscribed on metallic plaques in white letters on a blue background or in white tiles on a background of blue tiles.

The first renovations took place after the Second World War, when the installation of fluorescent lighting revealed the poor state of the original tiling. Three main styles of redecoration followed in succession.

- Between 1948 and 1967 the RATP installed standardised coloured metallic wall casings in 73 stations.
- From the end of the 1960s a new style was rolled out in around 20 stations, known as Mouton-Duvernet after the first station concerned. The white tiles were replaced to a height of 2 m (6 ft 7 in) with non-bevelled tiles in various shades of orange. Intended to be warm and dynamic, the renovations proved unpopular. The decoration has been removed as part of the "Renouveau du métro" programme.
- From 1975 some stations were redecorated in the Motte style, which emphasised the original white tiling but brought touches of colour to light fixtures, seating and the walls of connecting tunnels. The subsequent Ouï Dire style features audaciously shaped seats and light housings with complementary multicoloured uplighting.

A number of stations have original decorations to reflect the cultural significance of their locations. The first to receive this treatment was Louvre – Rivoli on line 1, which contains copies of the masterpieces on display at the museum. Other notable examples include Bastille (line 1), Saint-Germain-des-Prés (line 4), Cluny – La Sorbonne (line 10) and Arts et Métiers (line 11).

=== Exterior decoration ===
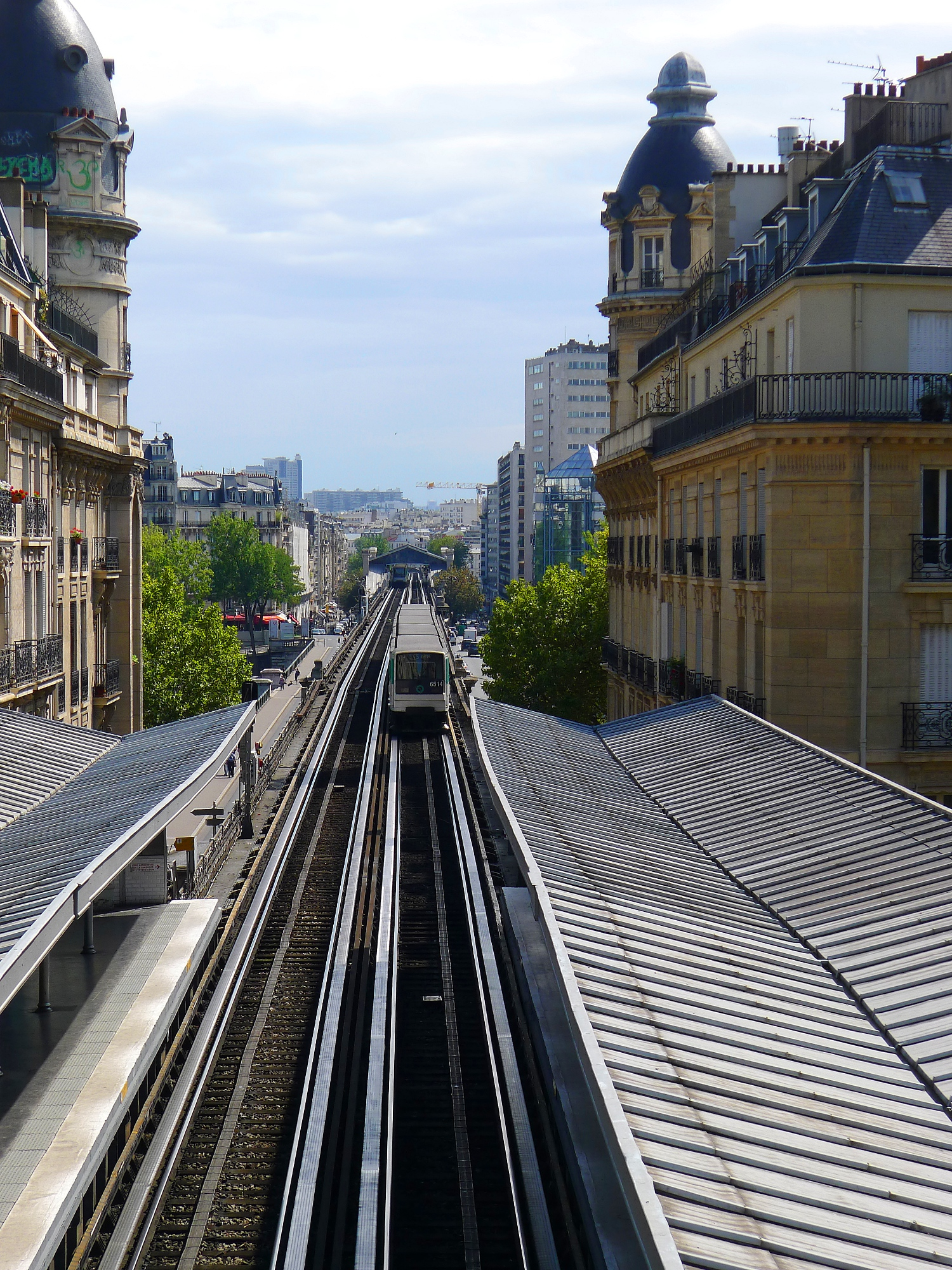
Overview of Passy station

The original Art Nouveau entrances are iconic symbols of Paris. There are 83 of them. Designed by Hector Guimard in a style that caused some surprise and controversy in 1900, there are two main variants:

- The most elaborate feature glass canopies. Two original canopies still exist, at Porte Dauphine and Abbesses (originally located at Hôtel de Ville until moved in the 1970s). A replica of the canopy at Abbesses was installed at Châtelet station at the intersection of Rue des Halles and Rue Sainte-Opportune.
- A cast-iron balustrade decorated in plant-like motifs, accompanied by a "Métropolitain" sign supported by two orange globes atop ornate cast-iron supports in the form of plant stems.
  - Several of the iconic Guimard entrances have been given to other cities. The only original one on a metro station outside Paris is at Square-Victoria-OACI station in Montreal, as a monument to the collaboration of RATP engineers. Replicas cast from the original moulds have been given to the Lisbon Metro (Picoas station); the Mexico City Metro (Metro Bellas Artes, with a "Metro" sign), offered as a gift in return for a Huichol mural displayed at Palais Royal – Musée du Louvre; and Chicago Metra (Van Buren Street, at South Michigan Avenue and East Van Buren Street, with a "Metra" sign), given in 2001. The Moscow Metro has a Guimard entrance at Kievskaya station, donated by the RATP in 2006. There is an entrance on display at the Sculpture Garden in Downtown Washington, D.C. This does not lead to a metro station, it is just for pleasure. Similarly, The Museum of Modern Art has an original, restored Guimard entrance outdoors in the Abby Aldrich Rockefeller Sculpture Garden.

Later stations and redecorations have brought increasingly simple styles to entrances.

- Classical stone balustrades were chosen for some early stations in prestigious locations (Franklin D. Roosevelt, République).
- Simpler metal balustrades accompany a "Métro" sign crowned by a spherical lamp in other early stations (Saint-Placide).
- Minimalist stainless-steel balustrades (Havre-Caumartin) appeared from the 1970s and signposts with just an "M" have been the norm since the war (Olympiades, opened 2007).

A handful of entrances have original architecture (Saint-Lazare); a number are integrated into residential or standalone buildings (Pelleport).

== Future ==
=== Under construction ===
- As part of the Grand Paris Express project:
  - The first (southern) section of future Line 15 between Pont de Sèvres and Noisy–Champs. This section is 33 km (21 mi) long and will have sixteen stations. Opening is currently planned for 2026.
  - The first (northern) section of future Line 16 between Saint-Denis–Pleyel and Clichy–Montfermeil with seven new stations. Opening is currently planned for 2026.
  - The first (southern) section of future Line 17 between Saint-Denis–Pleyel and Le Bourget–Aéroport with four new stations. Opening is currently planned for 2026.
  - The first (central) section of future Line 18 between Christ de Saclay and Massy–Palaiseau, with four new stations. Opening is currently planned for 2026.
  - The second (eastern) section of Line 18 between Massy–Palaiseau and Aéroport d'Orly with three new stations. Opening is currently planned for 2027.

=== Planned ===
The original Grand Paris Express plans had a total span of 200 kilometres (124 mi) and counted 68 stations, the completion of which forms the major part of the currently planned lines.

- Line 15, the longest of the new Grand Paris Express lines, will be a circular line around Paris when completed in 2031.
- The second (southern) section of Line 16 between Clichy–Montfermeil and Noisy–Champs will open in 2028.
- Line 17 will be additionally extended in two phases in 2028 & 2030 to Le Mesnil-Amelot, running through Charles de Gaulle Airport.
- Line 18 will be extended to the north, to Versailles Chantiers, by 2030.

=== Proposed ===
In addition to the projects already under construction or currently being actively studied, there have also been proposals for:

- An extension of Line 1 from Château de Vincennes to Val de Fontenay, connecting to RER and future Line 15 in 2035.
- An extension of Line 3 to Bécon-les-Bruyères connecting to Transilien and future Line 15.
- An extension of Line 5 to Place de Rungis (south) and Drancy (north, connecting to RER), as well as a new infill station (Bobigny–La Folie) and the possibility to take over the line 7 ranch to Villejuif-Louis Aragon.
- An extension of Line 7 to Mairie de Drancy.
- An extension of Line 9 to Montreuil–Hôpital connecting to Line 11.
- An extension of Line 10 from Boulogne–Pont de Saint-Cloud to Saint-Cloud, connecting to Transilien and future Line 15.
- An extension of Line 10 from Gare d'Austerlitz to Ivry–Place Gambetta or even Les Ardoines, the latter connecting to RER and future Line 15 (around 2030 to 2035).
- An extension of Line 11 to Noisy–Champs as part of the Grand Paris Express, connecting to RER and future Lines 15 and 16.
- An extension of Line 12 to Meudon-sur-Seine (south) and La Courneuve–6 Routes (north), the latter connecting to RER and future Lines 16 and 17.
- An extension of Line 13's Saint-Denis-Université branch to Stains la Cerisaie and Les Courtilles branch to Port de Gennevilliers.
- An extension of Line 17 south to Nanterre–La Folie, under study for completion after 2030 as part of the Grand Paris Express.
- An extension of Line 18 north to Nanterre–La Folie, under study for completion after 2030 as part of the Grand Paris Express.
- In 2023, the Grand Paris Express plans were extended with the addition of Line 19, serving Val-d'Oise on a route from Nanterre–La Folie to Aéroport Charles de Gaulle 2 TGV, under study for a completion around 2040.
- A merger of Line 3bis and Line 7bis to form a new line.

== Cultural significance ==
The Metro has a cultural significance in the arts that goes well beyond Paris. The term "metro" has become a generic name for subways and urban underground railways.

The station entrance kiosks, designed by Hector Guimard, fostered Art Nouveau building style (once widely known as "le style Métro"); however, some French commentators criticised the Guimard station kiosks, including their green colour and sign lettering, as difficult to read.

The success of rubber-tired lines led to their export to metro systems around the world, starting with the Montreal Metro. The success of Montreal "did much to accelerate the international subway boom" of the 1960s/1970s and "assure the preeminence of the French in the process". Rubber-tired systems were adopted in Mexico City, Santiago, Lausanne, Turin, Singapore and other cities. The Japanese adopted rubber-tired metros (with their own technology and manufacturing firms) to systems in Kobe, Sapporo, as well as parts of Tokyo.

The "Rabbit of the Paris Metro" is an anthropomorphic rabbit visible on stickers on the doors of the trains since 1977 to advise passengers (especially children) of the risk of getting one's hands trapped when the doors are opening, as well as the risk of injury on escalators or becoming trapped in the closing doors. This rabbit is now a popular icon in Paris similar to the "mind the gap" phrase in London.

== See also ==
- Architecture of the Paris Metro
- List of metro systems
- List of Paris Metro stations
- Paris in the Belle Époque
- Rail transport in France
- Rubber-tyred metro
- Transport in Paris
- Transport in France

== Bibliography ==
- Bindi, A.; Lefeuvre, D. (1990). Le Métro de Paris : Histoire d'hier à demain (in French). Rennes, France: Ouest-France. ISBN 2-7373-0204-8.
- Bobrick, Benson (1981). Labyrinths of iron: A history of the world's subways. New York, US: Newsweek Books. ISBN 0-88225-299-2.
- Demade, Julien (2015). Les embarras de Paris, ou l'illusion techniciste de la politique parisienne des déplacements (in French). L'Harmattan. ISBN 978-2-343-06517-5.
- Descouturelle, Frédéric (2003). Le métropolitain d'Hector Guimard (in French). Somogy. ISBN 2-85056-815-5.
- Gaillard, M. (1991). Du Madeleine-Bastille à Météor : Histoire des transports Parisiens (in French). Amiens, France: Martelle. ISBN 2-87890-013-8.
- Hovey, Tamara (1991). Paris Underground. New York, US: Orchard Books. ISBN 0-531-05931-6.
- Lamming, C. (2001). Métro insolite (in French). Paris, France: Parigramme. ISBN 2-84096-190-3.
- Ovenden, Mark (2008). Paris Metro Style in map and station design. London, UK: Capital Transport. ISBN 978-1-85414-322-8.
- Tricoire, Jean (1999). Un siècle de métro en 14 lignes: De Bienvenüe à Météor (in French). Paris: Vie du rail. ISBN 978-2902808878.
