= Rabbit of the Paris Metro =

Safety mascot used in the Paris Metro

"Serge" depicted on the inside of a Paris metro carriage door (2026)

The Rabbit of the Paris Metro (French: Lapin du métro parisien), also known as Serge the Rabbit (Serge le lapin), is a fictional character that has been used as a mascot by the RATP Group since the 1970s to promote passenger safety in the Paris Metro. The rabbit has become a symbol of the Metro.

== Safety signage ==
Serge the Rabbit is depicted on stickers inside the train doors warning passengers against placing their fingers on the doors when they are opening.

Attention ! Ne mets pas tes mains sur les portes, tu risques de te faire pincer très fort.
(Warning! Do not put your hands on the doors, you risk pinching your fingers very hard.)

== Design ==
The rabbit design has changed over time, with the first version of it drawn in 1977 by Anne Le Lagadec. The rabbit has had an official Twitter account since 2014.
