= Paris Metro Line 19 =

French metro line project

Line 19
- Paris Metro Line 19

Overview
- Termini: Nanterre–La Folie; Aéroport Charles de Gaulle 2 TGV
- Connecting lines: Paris Metro Paris Metro Line 15 Paris Metro Line 17 Paris Metro Line 18 RER RER B RER C RER D RER E Transilien Transilien Line J (Paris-Saint-Lazare) Transilien Line H (Paris-Nord) Tramways in Île-de-France Île-de-France tramway Line 2 Île-de-France tramway Line 5 Île-de-France tramway Line 11
- Stations: 7 to 15 (under study)

Service
- System: Paris Metro

History
- Planned opening: 2040

Technical
- Line length: 25 to 30 km (16 to 19 mi)
- Conduction system: Automated

Paris Metro Line 19 is a planned line of the Paris Metro conceived as an expansion of the Grand Paris Express. Announced on 22 November 2023 by Valérie Pécresse, president of the Île-de-France region, and Marie-Christine Cavecchi, president of the Val-d'Oise department, it would connect Nanterre–La Folie, west of the La Défense business district, to the Triangle de Gonesse and Charles de Gaulle Airport. The line is intended to serve residential towns in Val-d'Oise, among them Argenteuil and Garges-lès-Gonesse; the department was largely left out of the Grand Paris Express. According to initial studies, it could open around 2040.

== Background ==
During the planning of the Grand Paris Express, Val-d'Oise officials criticised how little of the new network reached their department: its only planned station, Gonesse on Line 17, itself faced strong opposition. In 2021 the department commissioned an exploratory study for a metro line linking Charles de Gaulle Airport to the La Défense area through Val-d'Oise.

On 3 April 2023, Pécresse announced that a Line 19, requested by the Val-d'Oise department, would be written into the region's development master plan (SDRIF-E). The plan was approved in July 2023 and formally adopted in September 2024. A support committee launched by the department in June 2025 gathered more than 1,500 political, business and civil-society backers. Between May and September 2025 the department funded a first study of the line's potential and route. The state, the region and Île-de-France Mobilités have also launched studies of fifteen new metro lines and extensions across the region, funded 70 per cent by the region and 30 per cent by the state and running until the end of 2027.

== Route ==
The route initially floated in April 2023 ran from Nanterre to Saint-Denis via Argenteuil, with a possible later branch from Argenteuil to Cergy. At the formal launch on 22 November 2023, Pécresse and Cavecchi presented a different alignment ending at the Triangle de Gonesse rather than Saint-Denis, where the line would meet Line 17 towards Charles de Gaulle Airport; north of Gonesse the two lines could share tracks, allowing through services from Nanterre to the airport. The Cergy branch was dropped in favour of a planned bus rapid transit line. As presented, the line would be 25 to 30 kilometres long with 9 to 11 stations depending on the alignment, mostly underground and fully automated, with trains of the same type as Line 17.

The results of the first studies were published on 5 February 2026. Three broad route options are being studied, two ending at Gonesse and one continuing to Charles de Gaulle Airport; the variants ending at Gonesse would connect there to Line 17. Costs range from €4.8 billion to €6.7 billion depending on the option, with 7 to 15 stations.

Route options examined in the first studies
Option	Route	Estimated cost
1 (express variant)	Nanterre–La Folie – Gonesse via Ermont–Eaubonne	€4.8–5.8 billion
1 (local variant)	Nanterre–La Folie – Gonesse via Ermont–Eaubonne	€4.8–5.8 billion
2A	Nanterre–La Folie – Charles de Gaulle Airport via Saint-Gratien	€5.6–6.7 billion
2B	Nanterre–La Folie – Gonesse via Saint-Gratien	€5.6–6.7 billion
3	Nanterre–La Folie – Gonesse via Sartrouville	€6 billion

Construction is expected during the 2030s, with the line opening around 2040.

== Funding ==
Some €6.5 million of preliminary studies were announced in November 2023, with the region agreeing to contribute alongside the department. Construction was initially estimated at around €6.5 billion in November 2023, revised to between €4.8 billion and €6.7 billion by the 2026 studies. Financial support from the French state is under consideration; according to the two presidents, the state is not opposed to taking part. The line is not legally part of the Grand Paris Express, and integrating it would require a new law.

The project has drawn scepticism. The national transport users' federation FNAUT said the scheme had come "out of nowhere" and was quickly granted study funding, and some Val-d'Oise residents worry that it could crowd out funding for the planned extension of tramway Line 11.
