= List of public transport routes numbered 19 =

In public transport, Route 19 may refer to:

- Melbourne tram route 19
- Route 19 (MTA Maryland), a bus route in Baltimore, Maryland and its suburbs
- London Buses route 19
- 19 Polk, a bus route in San Francisco

== See also ==
- Line 19 (disambiguation)
