= Mairie de Vitry-sur-Seine station =

Paris Metro station in Vitry-sur-Seine

Mairie de Vitry-sur-Seine
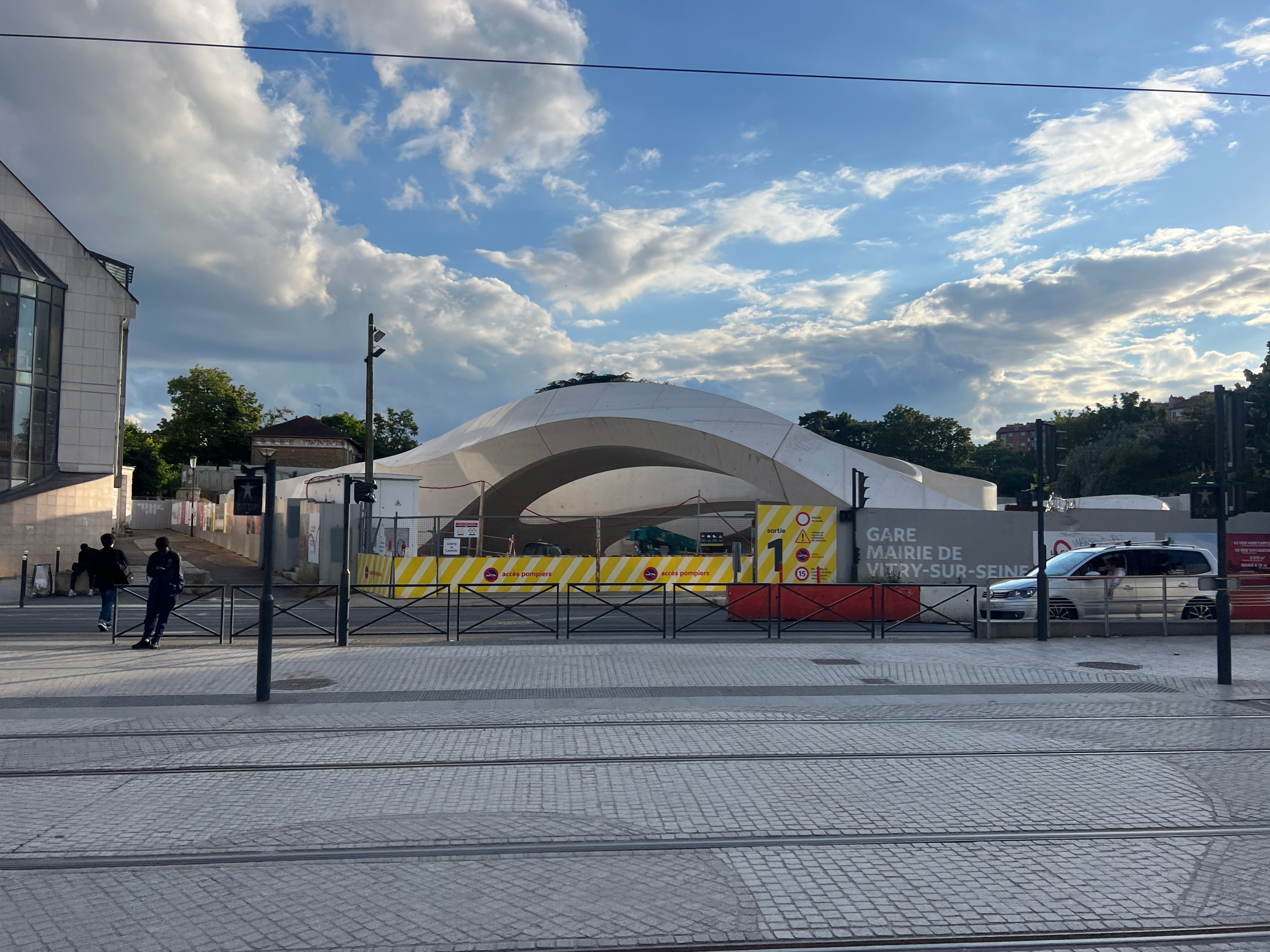
- Mairie de Vitry-sur-Seine station construction in June 2024

General information
- Location: Vitry-sur-Seine; France
- Coordinates: 48°47′24″N 2°23′14″E
- Owner: Société du Grand Paris
- Operator: ORA (RATP Dev, Alstom and ComfortDelGro)
- Platforms: 2 side platforms
- Tracks: 2
- Connections: Tramways in Île-de-France Île-de-France tramway Line 9

Construction
- Structure type: Underground
- Depth: 27 m (89 ft)
- Accessible: Yes
- Architect: Abdelkader Benchamma

Other information
- Station code: GA15 / 15VIC
- Fare zone: 3

History
- Opening: Autumn 2027

Services
Preceding station	Paris Metro	Following station
Villejuif–Louis Aragon towards Pont de Sèvres	Line 15	Les Ardoines towards Noisy–Champs
Location

Mairie de Vitry-sur-Seine (French pronunciation: [mɛʁi də vitʁi syʁ sɛn]) is an upcoming underground station on Line 15 of the Paris Metro. It is part of the Grand Paris Express project. The station is located in the town of Vitry-sur-Seine at the intersection of Rue Édouard-Tremblay and Avenue Maximilien-Robespierre.

The station will serve as an interchange point between Line 15 and Île-de-France tramway Line 9, and will be located close to the Vitry-sur-Seine Town Hall (Mairie de Vitry-sur-Seine), Val-de-Marne Museum of Contemporary Art and Coteau-Marcel Rosette Park.

The station will first open in autumn 2027 when service starts on Line 15.
