= Champigny Centre station =

Provisional name of a future station on Paris Metro Line 15

Champigny Centre
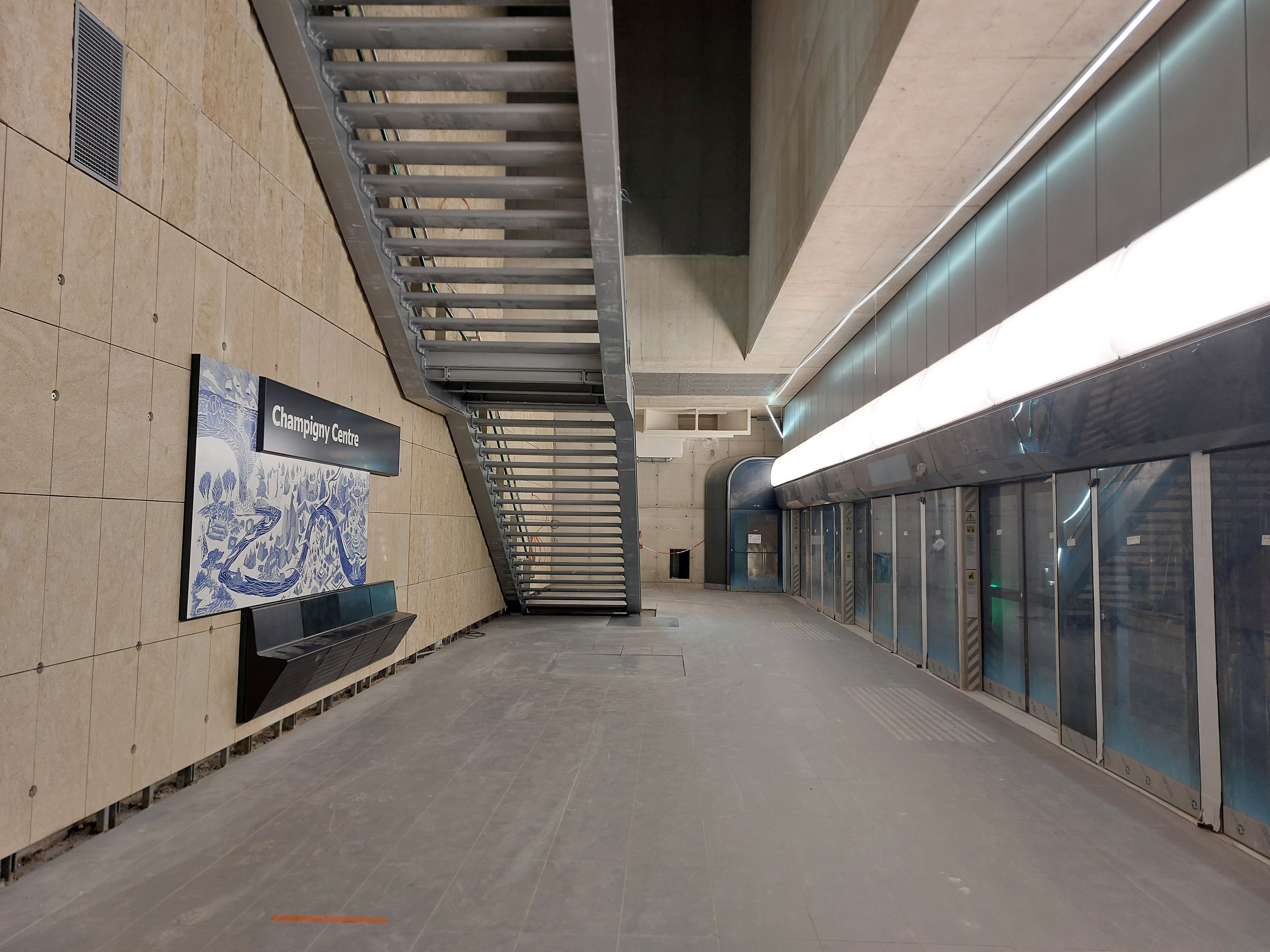
- Champigny Centre station's platforms in 2025.

General information
- Location: Avenue Roger Salengro; Champigny-sur-Marne; France
- Coordinates: 48°48′58″N 2°30′08″E

Construction
- Structure type: Underground
- Depth: 21 m (69 ft)
- Accessible: Yes

Other information
- Fare zone: 3

History
- Opening: Autumn 2027

Services
Preceding station	Paris Metro	Following station
Saint-Maur–Créteil towards Pont de Sèvres	Line 15 South (autumn 2027)	Villiers–Champigny–Bry towards Noisy–Champs
Location

Champigny Centre station (French pronunciation: [ʃɑ̃piɲi sɑ̃tʁ]) is the provisional name of a future station on Line 15 of the Paris Metro, which is part of the Grand Paris Express project. The station will serve the city of Champigny-sur-Marne.

The design of the station is complex with three underground zones: one platform area for Line 15 East (used by trains heading north towards Saint-Denis–Pleyel or west towards Pont de Sèvres), one platform area for Line 15 South (used by trains heading west towards Pont de Sèvres or east towards Noisy–Champs), and a mezzanine between the platforms. The platforms are located parallel to each other. The station will open in autumn 2027 along with the rest of Line 15 South, but service via Line 15 East will not begin until 2031.

The station walls extend as far down as 60 metres (200 ft) and the station platforms will be located 21 metres (69 ft) below street level.

== History ==
The station site was once a technical center for the city of Champigny-sur-Marne. The land was acquired by the Société du Grand Paris at the end of 2012 for €4 million. Preparatory work for station construction took place from April 2015 to the end of 2016.

The company Systra and the architectural firm Richez Associés were chosen for the engineering and architecture of this station.

Construction of the station box began in March 2018 and excavation of the interior space started in May 2018. Construction of the station's entrance plaza began in April 2020. Line 15 South's section of the station will open in autumn 2027 and while the station box for Line 15 East will be complete, it will not open for revenue service until 2031.

The station is currently being referred to by its project name Champigny Centre. However, the official name of the station will be chosen through a consultation process, in which the public has been asked to choose among two proposals: Champigny Centre and Champigny–La Plage.

== Architecture and artwork ==
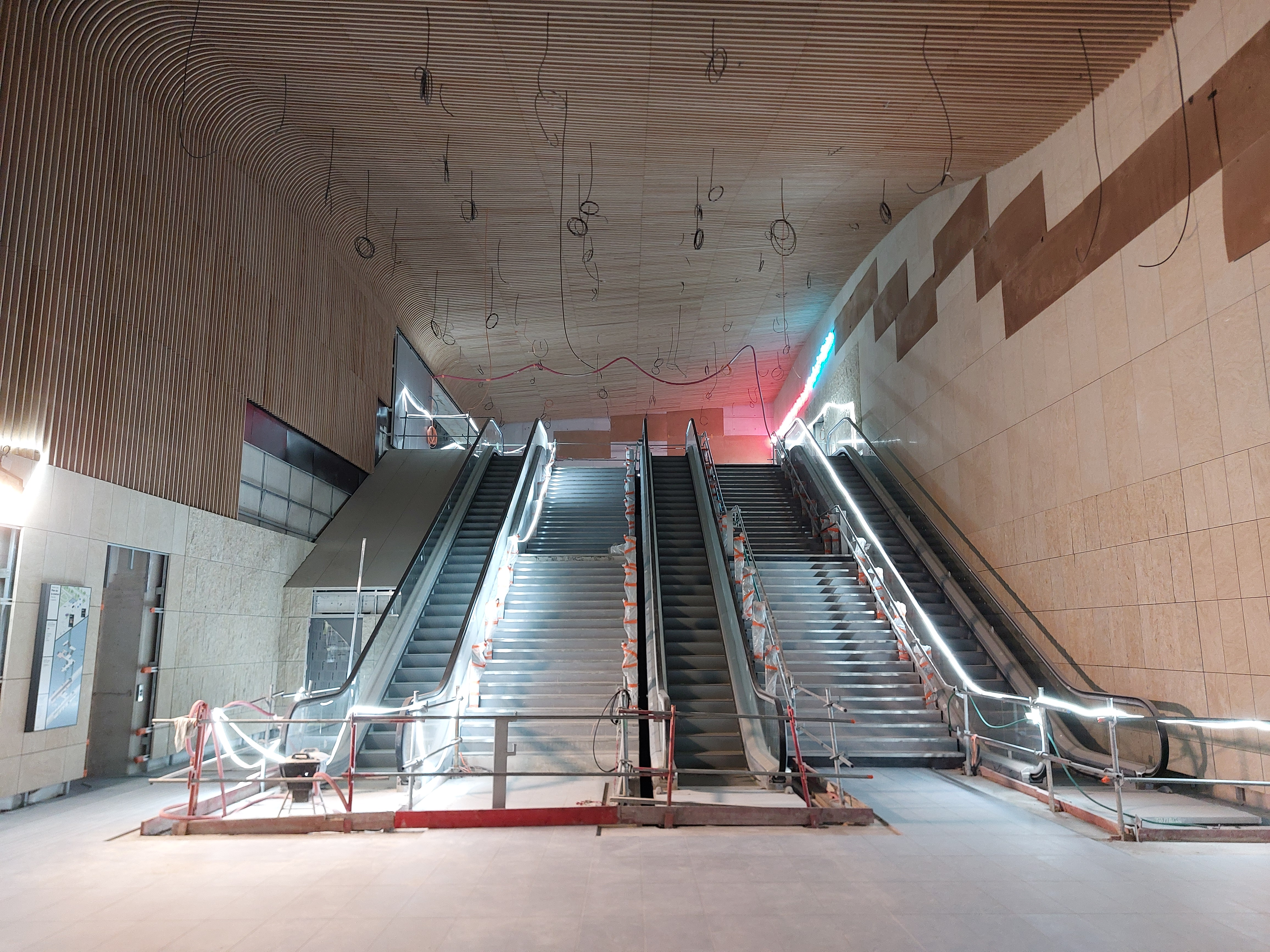
A hall under construction, September 2025

The primary architect for the station is Thomas Richez and his firm Richez Associés. Inside, on all the walls, the station will feature the millstone characteristic of the houses on the banks of the Marne and a railway bridge near the station. A large ceiling in the form of a metal sheet which seems to flow will also evoke the Marne.

The station will also feature a colorful neon light installation with letters which form the phrase “love differences” in 16 languages created by Michelangelo Pistoletto, and a fresco by Kevin Lucbert.
