= Villiers–Champigny–Bry station =

Future Paris metro station

Villiers–Champigny–Bry
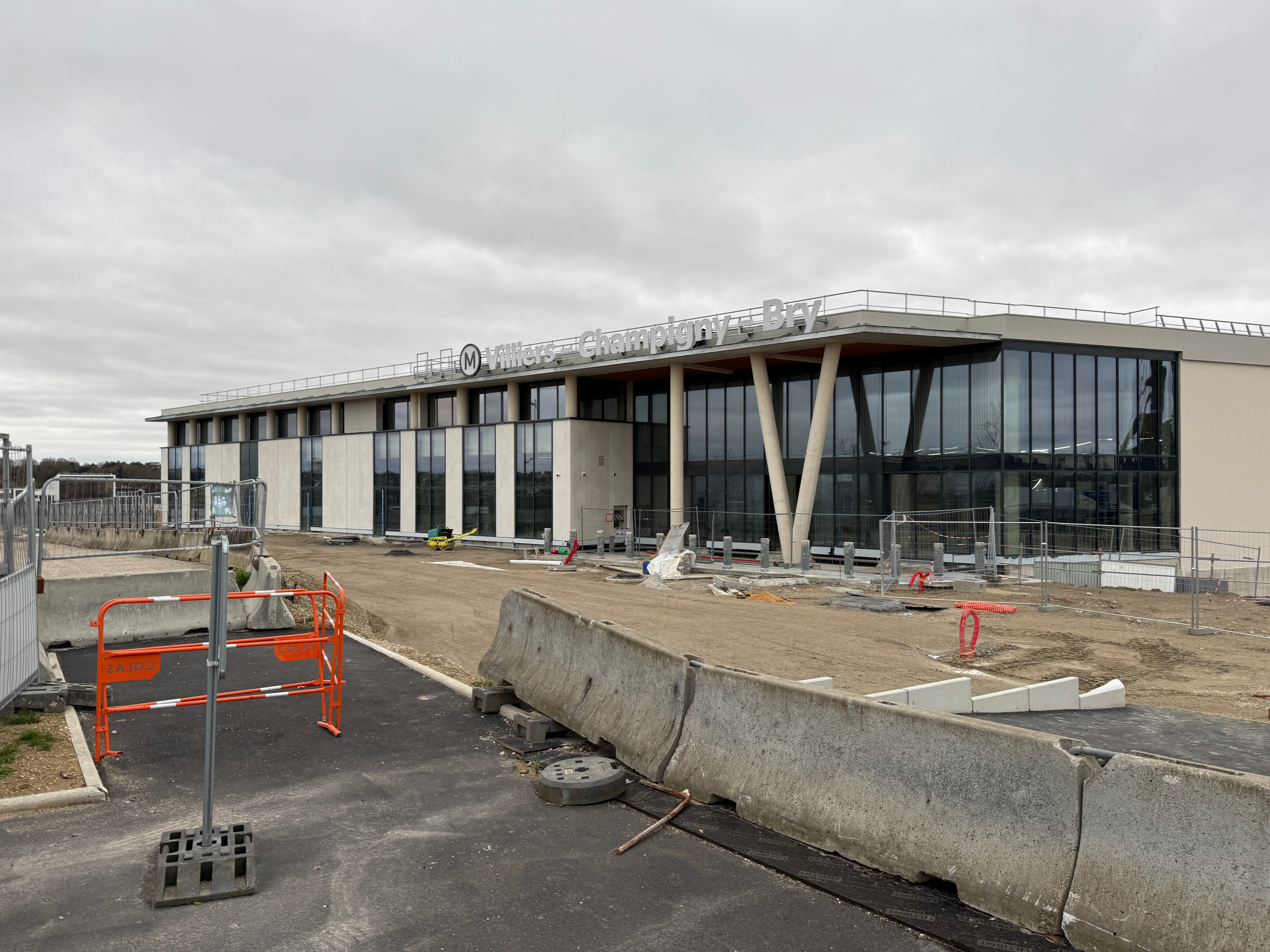
- Villiers–Champigny–Bry station construction, February 2026

General information
- Location: France
- Coordinates: 48°49′26″N 2°31′34″E
- Owner: Société du Grand Paris
- Operator: ORA (RATP Dev, Alstom and ComfortDelGro)
- Platforms: 2 side platforms
- Tracks: 2

Construction
- Structure type: Underground
- Depth: 23 m (75 ft)
- Accessible: Yes
- Architect: Thomas Richez

Other information
- Station code: GA09 / 09BVC
- Fare zone: 4

History
- Opening: Autumn 2027

Services
Preceding station	Paris Metro	Following station
Champigny Centre towards Pont de Sèvres	Line 15	Noisy–Champs Terminus
Preceding station	RER	Following station
Les Boullereaux-Champigny towards Nanterre–La Folie	RER E	Villiers-sur-Marne–Le Plessis-Trévise towards Tournan
Preceding station	Transilien	Following station
Paris-Est Terminus	Line P	Tournan towards Coulommiers
Paris-Est Terminus	Line P	Verneuil-l'Étang towards Provins
Location

Villiers–Champigny–Bry (French pronunciation: [vilje ʃɑ̃piɲi bʁi]) is an upcoming underground station on Line 15 of the Paris Metro. It is part of the Grand Paris Express project. The station will serve the neighboring towns of Villiers-sur-Marne, Champigny-sur-Marne and Bry-sur-Marne. In the future, additional platforms are expected to be built to serve the RER E and Transilien Line P. The station will open in autumn 2027 along with the rest of Line 15 South.
