= Saint-Maur–Créteil station =

Railway station in France

Saint-Maur–Créteil
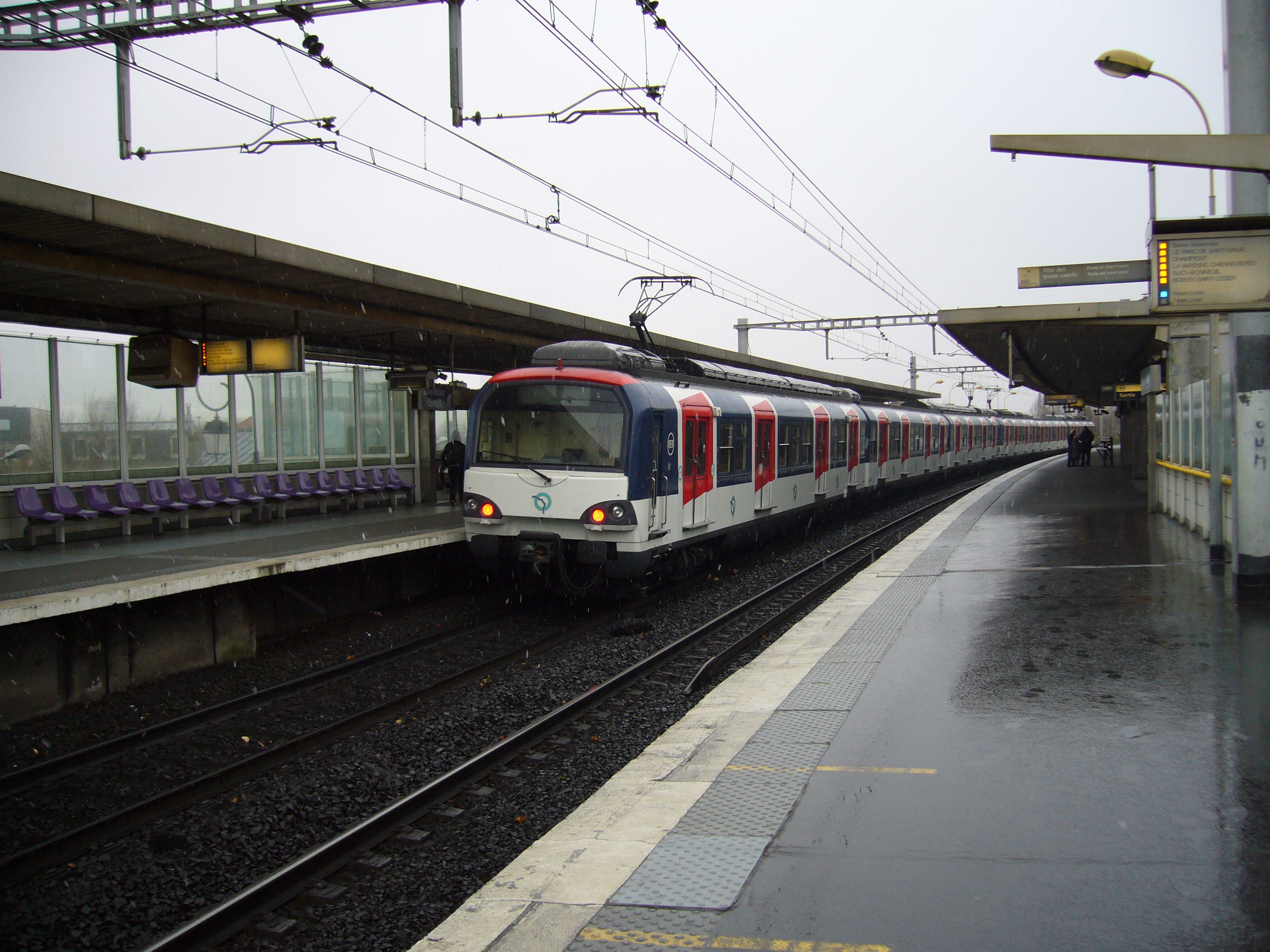
- Saint-Maur–Créteil station platforms

General information
- Location: Saint-Maur-des-Fossés; France
- Coordinates: 48°48′23″N 2°28′20″E
- Operator: RATP Group
- Platforms: 2 side platforms
- Tracks: 2
- Connections: RATP Bus: Tvm 107 111 112 306; Noctilien: N35 N71

Construction
- Structure type: Elevated
- Cycle facilities: Racks
- Accessible: Yes, by request to staff

Other information
- Station code: 87758151
- Fare zone: 4

History
- Opened: 22 September 1859
- Rebuilt: 1969

Services
Preceding station	RER	Following station
Joinville-le-Pont towards Saint-Germain-en-Laye	RER A	Le Parc de Saint-Maur towards Boissy-Saint-Léger

Future services
Preceding station	Paris Metro	Following station
Créteil–L'Échat towards Pont de Sèvres	Line 15 (autumn 2027)	Champigny Centre towards Noisy–Champs
Location

Saint-Maur–Créteil station (French pronunciation: [sɛ̃moʁ kʁetɛi]) is a railway station in the commune of Saint-Maur-des-Fossés, Val-de-Marne. It is served by RER A and will be served by Paris Metro Line 15 starting in autumn 2027 as part of the Grand Paris Express project.

== History ==
Saint-Maur–Créteil opened in its current form as an RER station on 14 December 1969 as part of the initial segment of the RER network with trains to Nation in central Paris and Boissy-Saint-Léger.

== Service ==
=== RER A ===
Saint-Maur–Créteil is on the A2 branch of the RER A with eastbound trains to Boissy-Saint-Léger and westbound trains to Saint-Germain-en-Laye. During peak times, there are up to twelve trains per hour (every five minutes). At off-peak times trains arrive every ten minutes and every fifteen minutes early mornings and late nights.

=== Line 15 ===
Paris Metro Line 15 will serve this station starting in autumn 2027 when Line 15 South opens. The station is being constructed as part of the Grand Paris Express project.

=== Bus connections ===
The station is served by several buses:

- RATP Bus: Tvm , 107 , 111 , 112 , 306
- Noctilien: N35, N71
