= Paris Metro Line 15 =

Planned metro line in Île-de-France

Line 15
- Paris Metro Line 15
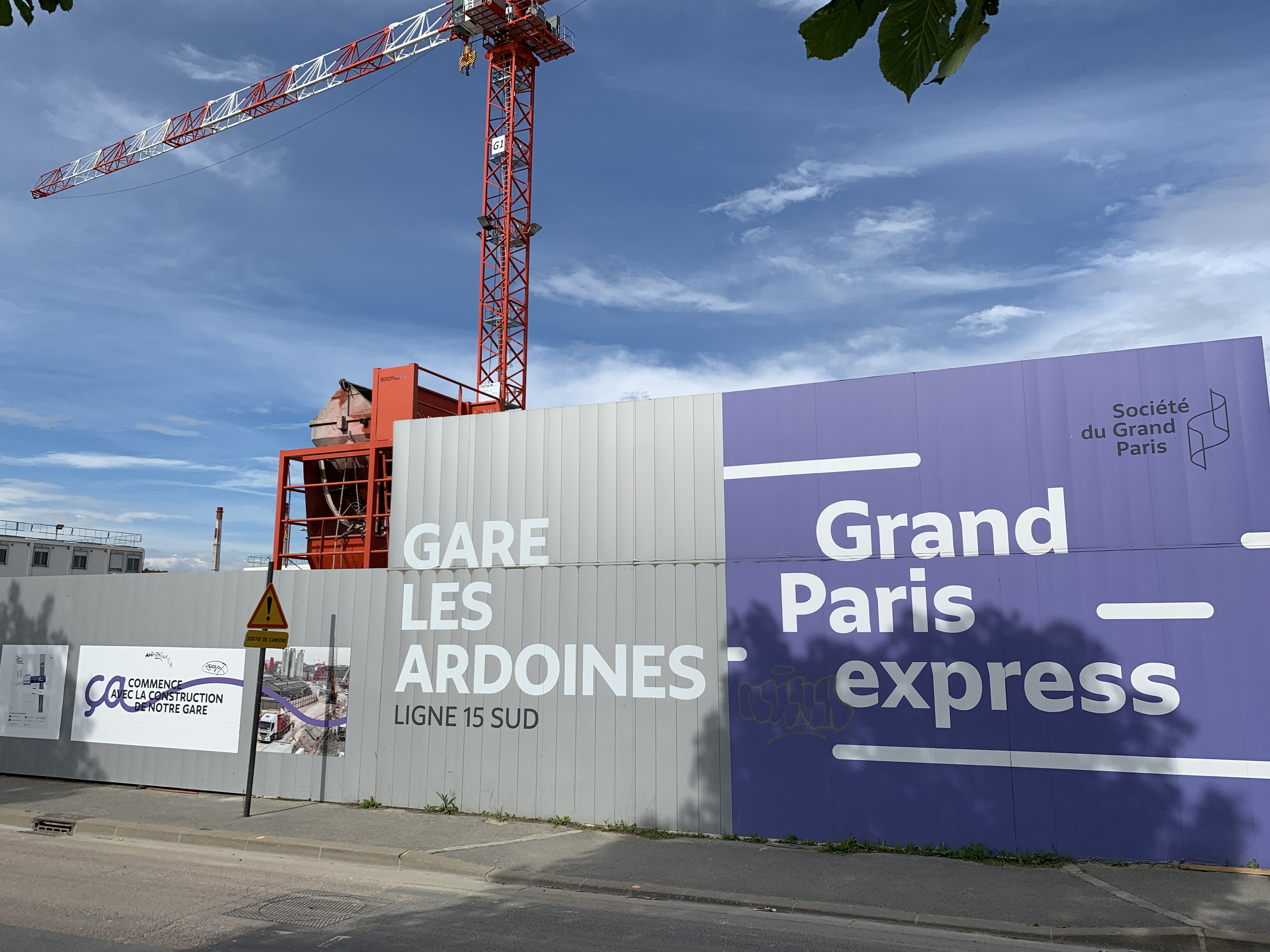
- Construction at Les Ardoines

Overview
- Locale: Seine-et-Marne; Val-de-Marne; Hauts-de-Seine; Seine-Saint-Denis
- Termini: Noisy–Champs; Pont de Sèvres (2027); Champigny Centre (2031)
- Connecting lines: Paris Metro Paris Metro Line 1 Paris Metro Line 4 Paris Metro Line 5 Paris Metro Line 7 Paris Metro Line 8 Paris Metro Line 9 Paris Metro Line 11 Paris Metro Line 12 Paris Metro Line 13 Paris Metro Line 14 Paris Metro Line 16 Paris Metro Line 17 Paris Metro Line 18 RER RER A RER B RER C RER D RER E Transilien Transilien Line J (Paris-Saint-Lazare) Transilien Line L (Paris-Saint-Lazare) Transilien Line N (Paris-Montparnasse) Transilien Line U Tramways in Île-de-France Île-de-France tramway Line 1 Île-de-France tramway Line 2 Île-de-France tramway Line 4 Île-de-France tramway Line 6 Île-de-France tramway Line 7 Île-de-France tramway Line 8 Île-de-France tramway Line 9 Île-de-France tramway Line 11
- Stations: 36 (entire line)

Service
- System: Paris Metro
- Operator(s): ORA (Alstom, ComfortDelGro, RATP Dev)
- Rolling stock: 27 Alstom Metropolis MR6V

History
- Planned opening: Autumn 2027 (Noisy–Champs – Pont de Sèvres); 2031 (rest of the line)

Technical
- Line length: 75 km (47 mi)
- Track gauge: 1,435 mm (4 ft 8 1/2 in) standard gauge
- Electrification: Overhead line, 1,500 V DC
Route map

Paris Metro Line 15 is one of the four new lines of Grand Paris Express, a major expansion project of the Paris Metro throughout Ile-de-France region. Currently under construction, the line will provide a new orbital route through the suburbs of Paris, servicing the departments of Hauts-de-Seine, Val-de-Marne and Seine-Saint-Denis and allowing people to commute from suburbs to suburbs without necessarily entering Paris. The southern section of the line is planned to open in autumn 2027, with the completed line currently planned to open in 2031.

In line with all Grand Paris Express lines, Line 15 will be fully automated from day one. Upon completion, Line 15 will be one of the world's longest underground rapid transit train tunnels fully dedicated to passenger service, and also become the longest driverless metro line in the world.

Line 15 is built by the Société des Grands Projets (SGP), a public agency formerly known as the Société du Grand Paris, until its rebranding in late 2023 to reflect an expanded scope in national infrastructure projects.

== History ==
Line 15's route bears a strong resemblance to the Arc Express proposal initially presented by RATP in 2006. It was subsequently incorporated as the "Red Line" within the Grand Paris public transportation network project, introduced by then-President Nicolas Sarkozy in 2009. The line received its current designation in 2013 when Prime Minister Jean-Marc Ayrault announced the "New Grand Paris" project.

The initial 2013 government plan announced groundbreaking for the southern section in early 2015, groundbreaking for the western and eastern segments in 2020, opening of the southern section in 2024 (later revised to 2025, then to summer 2026, then to late 2026, then to April 2027, now to Autumn 2027) and completion of the western and eastern sections in 2030 (later revised to 2031). Delays to the opening of the southern section announced since 2024 have been attributed to problems during testing the line's day-to-day operation. These delays affect the opening of lines 16 and 17 despite both being physically disconnected from the southern section of Line 15.

Following mid-2026 adjustments, the SGP rescheduled Line 15 South's opening to autumn 2027, preceded by the first phase of Line 18 (connecting Massy–Palaiseau to CEA Saint-Aubin) in December 2026. This sequencing establishes Line 18 as the first brand new line of the Grand Paris Express network to enter public service, despite having the highest number.

=== Construction ===
Line 15 is constructed in two phases :

1. The line's southern section, connecting Pont de Sèvres and Noisy–Champs, is scheduled to open in Autumn 2027.
2. The complete line, encompassing western (Pont de Sèvres to Saint-Denis–Pleyel) and eastern sections (Saint-Denis–Pleyel to Champigny Centre), is projected for completion and inauguration in 2031.

==== Line 15 South ====
The southern section (Pont de Sèvres to Noisy–Champs) encompasses 16 stations, two maintenance depots and stretches 33 kilometres (21 mi). The construction of this section has encountered delays, missing the targeted opening before the 2024 Summer Olympics. This section of the line is estimated to have cost around €3.7 billion.

A significant engineering milestone was the completion of the Villejuif–Gustave Roussy station. While the station's upper levels began serving the Line 14 extension in 2024, its Line 15 platforms are located at a depth of -48.8 meters (level -9). It is the second-deepest station on the network, surpassed only by Saint-Maur–Créteil, and was designed as a vertical 'open cylinder' to allow natural light to reach the lower mezzanine levels.

Station	Image	Commune	Opening	Interchanges	Distance (in km)	
Noisy–Champs; Champy–Nesles		Noisy-le-Grand, Champs-sur-Marne	Autumn 2027	Paris Metro Paris Metro Line 16 RER RER A	–	0.0
Villiers–Champigny–Bry		Villiers-sur-Marne, Champigny-sur-Marne	Autumn 2027		5.4	5.4
Champigny Centre		Champigny-sur-Marne	Autumn 2027		2.1	7.5
Saint-Maur–Créteil		Saint-Maur-des-Fossés	Autumn 2027	RER RER A	3.2	10.7
Créteil–L'Échat; Hôpital Henri Mondor		Créteil	Autumn 2027	Paris Metro Paris Metro Line 8	2.4	13.1
Le Vert de Maisons		Maisons-Alfort, Alfortville	Autumn 2027	RER RER D	1.5	14.6
Les Ardoines		Vitry-sur-Seine	Autumn 2027	RER RER C	1.9	16.5
Mairie de Vitry-sur-Seine		Vitry-sur-Seine	Autumn 2027	Tramways in Île-de-France Île-de-France tramway Line 9	2.0	18.5
Villejuif–Louis Aragon		Villejuif	Autumn 2027	Paris Metro Paris Metro Line 7 Tramways in Île-de-France Île-de-France tramway Line 7	1.5	20.0
Villejuif–Gustave Roussy		Villejuif	Autumn 2027	Paris Metro Paris Metro Line 14	1.6	21.6
Arcueil–Cachan		Arcueil, Cachan	Autumn 2027	RER RER B	1.7	23.3
Bagneux–Lucie Aubrac		Bagneux	Autumn 2027	Paris Metro Paris Metro Line 4	0.9	24.2
Châtillon–Montrouge		Châtillon, Montrouge	Autumn 2027	Paris Metro Paris Metro Line 13 Tramways in Île-de-France Île-de-France tramway Line 6	1.6	25.8
Clamart		Clamart, Issy-les-Moulineaux, Vanves, Malakoff	Autumn 2027	Transilien Transilien Line N (Paris-Montparnasse)	2.0	27.8
Issy		Issy-les-Moulineaux	Autumn 2027	RER RER C	1.5	29.3
Pont de Sèvres		Boulogne-Billancourt	Autumn 2027	(at Musée de Sèvres)	2.5	31.8

==== Line 15 East and West ====
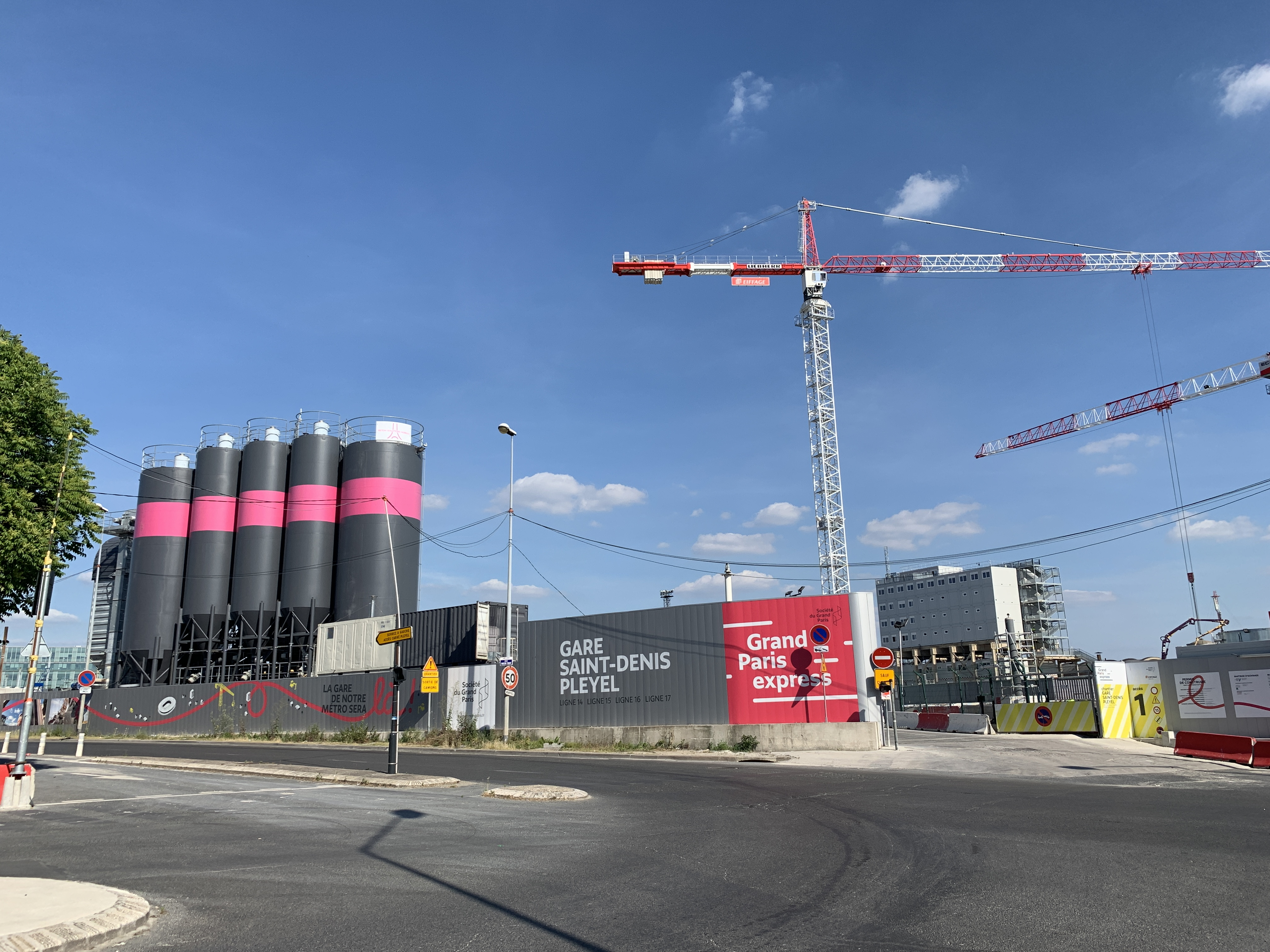
Saint-Denis–Pleyel station under construction

The northern section comprises two segments: west (Pont de Sèvres to Saint-Denis–Pleyel) and east (Saint-Denis–Pleyel to Champigny Centre). Upon completion, now scheduled for 2031, these sections will connect with the southern section to form the complete orbital route. This leg of the project will encompass 16 stations and a maintenance depot. The eastern section's initial cost estimate of €3.77 billion has been revised upwards to €5.65 billion (as of 2021).

While major construction contracts for the line itself haven't been awarded yet, preparatory work is underway at Saint-Denis–Pleyel and Champigny Centre stations, which are being built for other lines but will include platforms for Line 15.

== Rolling stock ==
In July 2018, Alstom secured a €1.3 billion contract to supply 183 Alstom Metropolis trains for the Grand Paris Express project, with the initial 162 cars (27 six-car Alstom Metropolis MR6V trains) designated for Line 15 to be delivered from 2022 onwards.

Train Specifications

- Width: Minimum of 2.8 m (9 ft 2 in)
- Length: 108 m (354 ft 4 in) — 6 cars with full-open interior gangways
- Capacity: 960 passengers (based on 4 passengers per square meter)
- Electrification: 1,500 V DC via pantograph and overhead line
- Operation: Fully automated
- Maximum operating speed: 120 km/h (75 mph)
- Frequency:
  - Theoretical maximum: 34,560 passengers per hour
  - Average headway: 3 to 4 minutes
  - Minimum headway: 2 minutes

In July 2023, the operation and maintenance contract for Line 15 South was awarded to the ORA Consortium, led by RATP Dev in partnership with Alstom and ComfortDelGro. As of April 2026, the consortium has entered the final dynamic testing phase for the automated Metropolis MR6V trains, focusing on system integration and station readiness along the 33-kilometer southern segment.
