= Issy station =

Station in Paris's express suburban rail system

Issy
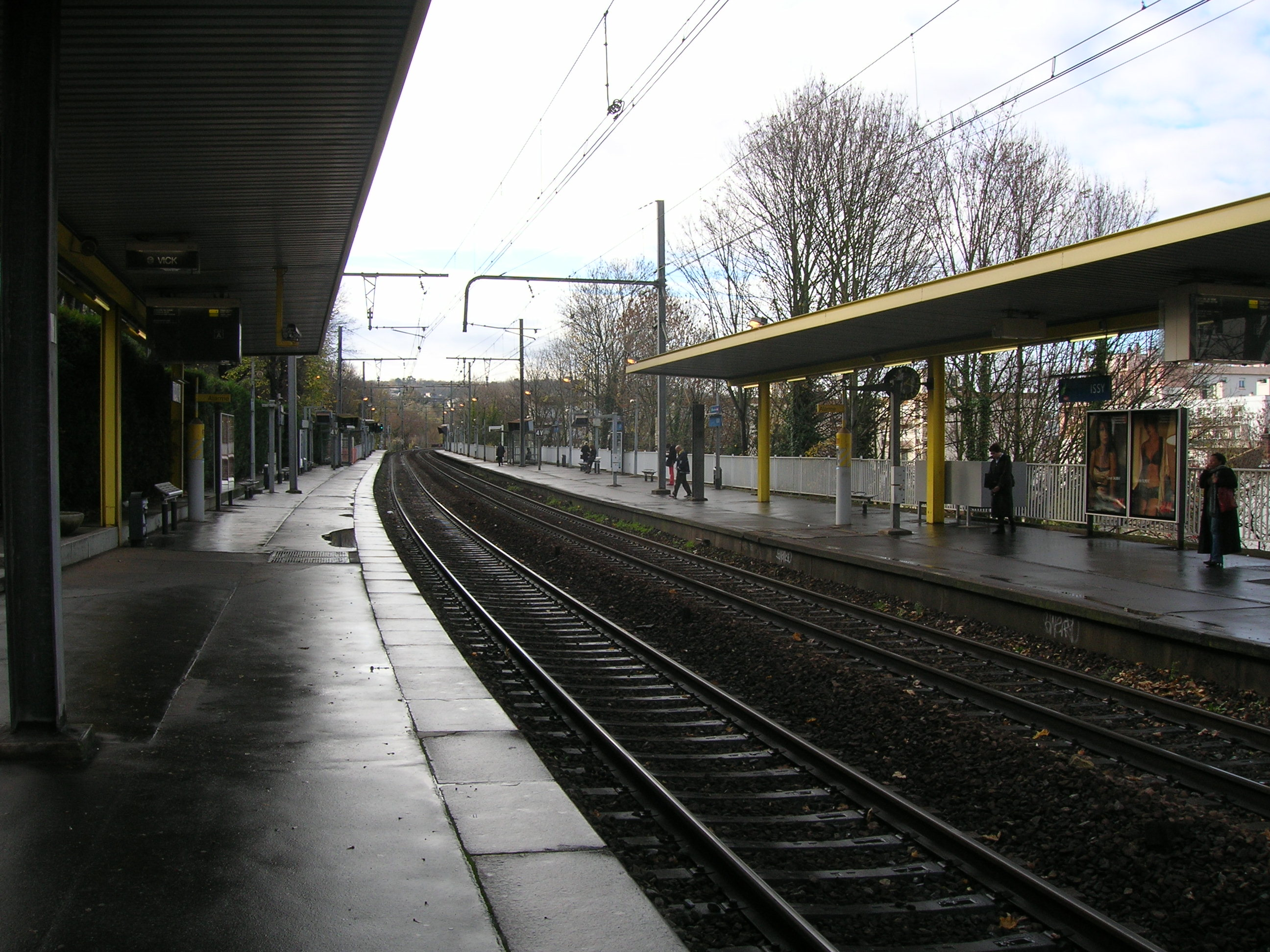
- Issy station RER C platforms

General information
- Location: 87 Avenue de Verdun; Issy-les-Moulineaux; France
- Coordinates: 48°49′11″N 2°15′33″E
- Operator: RER C: SNCF; Line 15: ORA (RATP Dev, Alstom & ComfortDelGro)
- Platforms: RER C: 2 side platforms; Line 15: 2 side platforms
- Tracks: RER C: 2; Line 15: 2

Construction
- Structure type: RER C: At-grade; Line 15: Underground
- Depth: Line 15: 20 m (66 ft)
- Accessible: RER C: No; Line 15: Yes

Other information
- Station code: 87393074
- Fare zone: 2

Passengers
- 2024: 2,373,723

Services
Preceding station	RER	Following station
Meudon-Val Fleury towards Versailles Château Rive Gauche or Saint-Quentin-en-Yvelines	RER C	Issy–Val de Seine towards Massy-Palaiseau, Dourdan-la-Forêt or Saint-Martin-d'Étampes

Future services
Preceding station	Paris Metro	Following station
Pont de Sèvres Terminus	Line 15 (autumn 2027)	Clamart towards Noisy–Champs
Location

Issy station (French: Gare d'Issy) is a station in Paris's express suburban rail system, the RER. It is situated in Issy-les-Moulineaux, in the département of Hauts-de-Seine.

In the near future, Issy will become a transfer station on Line 15 of the Paris Metro. It is part of the Grand Paris Express project, and will open in autumn 2027. A new station is being built at a depth of 20 metres (66 ft) under Avenue de Verdun. A new tramway line to La Croix de Berny and an extension of Metro Line 12 to Issy are also under consideration.

== See also ==
- List of Réseau Express Régional stations
