= Hôtel de Ville, Champigny-sur-Marne =

Town hall in Champigny-sur-Marne, France

Hôtel de Ville
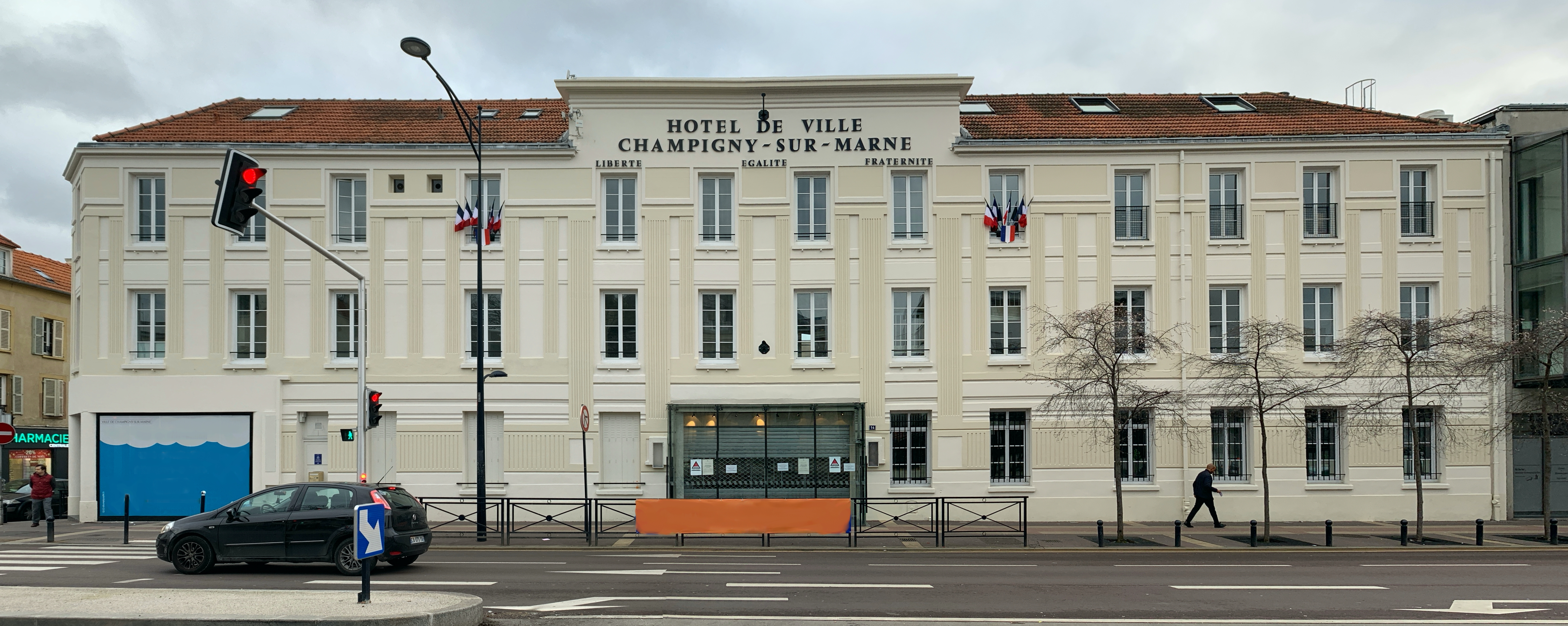
- The main frontage of the Hôtel de Ville in February 2023
- Interactive map of the Hôtel de Ville area

General information
- Type: City hall
- Architectural style: Neoclassical style
- Location: Champigny-sur-Marne, France
- Coordinates: 48.8133°N 2.5109°E
- Completed: 1931

Design and construction
- Architect: Julien Heulot

The Hôtel de Ville (French pronunciation: [otɛl də vil], City Hall) is a municipal building in Champigny-sur-Marne, Val-de-Marne, in the southeastern suburbs of Paris, France, standing on Rue Louis Talamoni.

== History ==
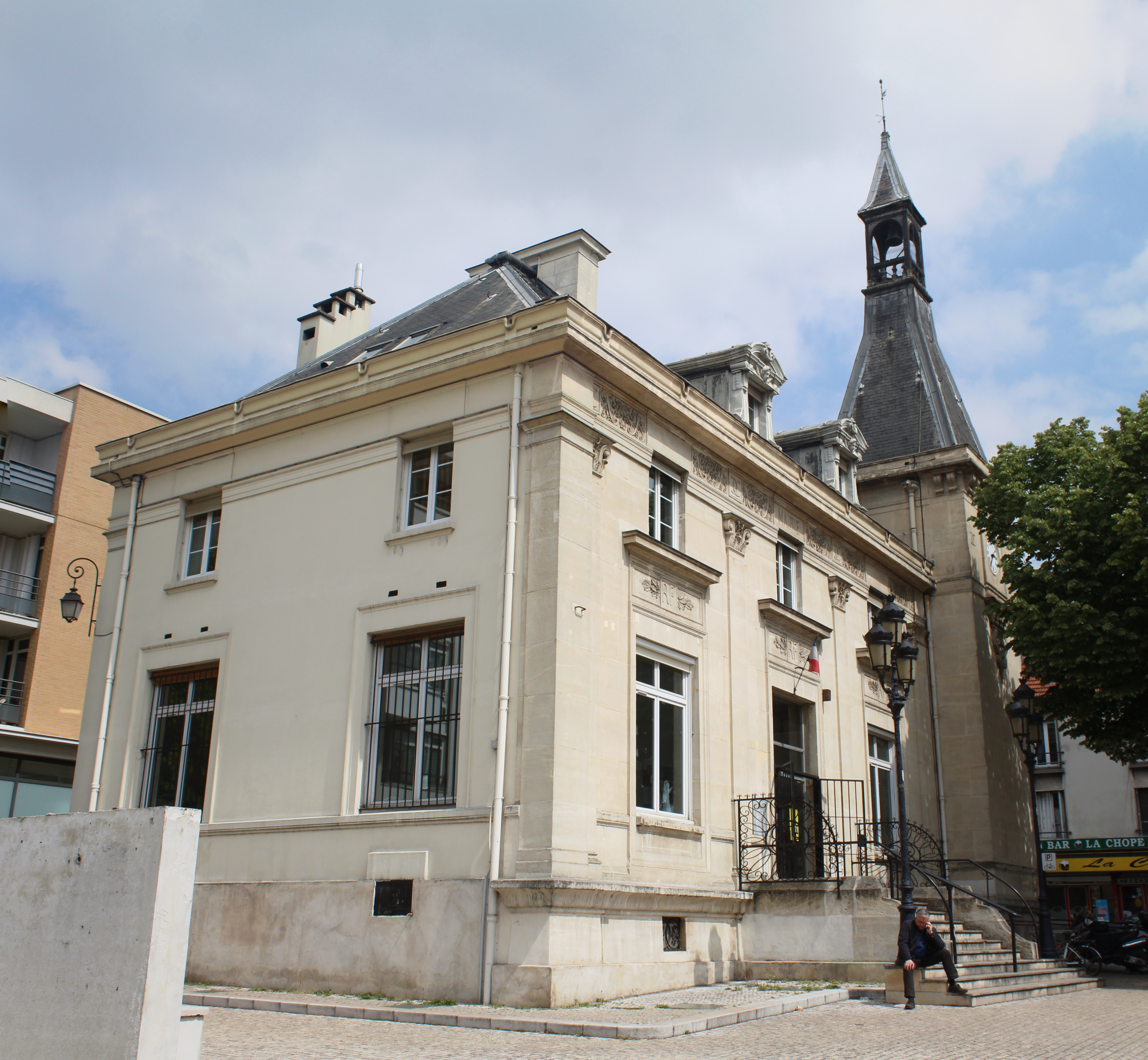
The old town hall

Following the French Revolution, the new town council met in a building known as the Maison Commune. However, in the mid-19th century, the town council decided to commission a dedicated town hall. The site they selected, on the north side of what is now Rue Louis Talamoni, was acquired in 1854. The new building was designed by the municipal architect, Louis Ducerf, in the neoclassical style, built in ashlar stone and was officially opened by the mayor, Pierre Emile Joseph Martelet, in 1857.

The design involved a main block of three bays on the left and a square tower, which was slightly projected forward, on the right. The tower was blind but displayed clock faces near the top, and it was surmounted by a pyramid-shaped roof with a small belfry. The central bay of the main block featured a short flight of steps leading up to a square headed doorway surmounted by a carved panel and a cornice. The outer bays on the ground floor were fenestrated with casement windows which were also surmounted by carved panels and cornices, while the first floor was fenestrated by small square windows. The central bay was flanked by full-height Corinthian order pilasters supporting an entablature and a cornice. There were two dormer windows at attic level.

The building was badly damaged by German shelling in December 1870 during the Battle of Villiers, part of the Franco-Prussian War, and was then restored under the supervision of the architect, Jules Simonet, between 1879 and 1880.

By the early 20th century, the old town hall was considered too small. The town council decided to acquire a former orphanage, which had been operated by the Daughters of Charity of Saint Vincent de Paul, on the opposite side of the road. It had served as an auxiliary hospital, operated by the l'Union des Femmes de France, during the First World War. The acquisition was completed in 1927. It was converted for municipal use to a design by Julien Heulot and was officially opened by the prefect of the Seine, Édouard Renard, in the presence of the former armaments minister, Albert Thomas, in 1931. The design involved a near-symmetrical main frontage of 13 bays facing onto what is now Rue Louis Talamoni. The central section of four bays featured a glass doorway on the ground floor and a raised parapet at roof level. There was a canted bay containing another doorway at the left-hand corner.

During the Paris insurrection, part of the Second World War, elements of the Francs-Tireurs et Partisans seized the town hall on 22 August 1944. German troops briefly regained control, before the town was liberated by the French 2nd Armoured Division, commanded by General Philippe Leclerc, on 25 August 1944.

After the Charonne subway massacre of February 1962, a plaque was fixed to a wall in the garden adjacent to the old town hall to commemorate the lives of the nine people who were killed by police while demonstrating against the Organisation armée secrète and the Algerian War. An extension, designed by Paul Chemetov in the modern style, was constructed to the west of the main building at a cost of €3.75 million and was completed in 1999.
