= Canton of Champigny-sur-Marne-1 =

Coordinates: 48.82°N 2.51°E

The canton of Champigny-sur-Marne-1 is an administrative division of the Val-de-Marne department, Île-de-France region, northern France. It was created at the French canton reorganisation which came into effect in March, 2015. Its seat is in Champigny-sur-Marne.

It consists of the following communes:

1. Champigny-sur-Marne (partly)
