= Trans-Val-de-Marne =

Bus Line operated in Paris, France

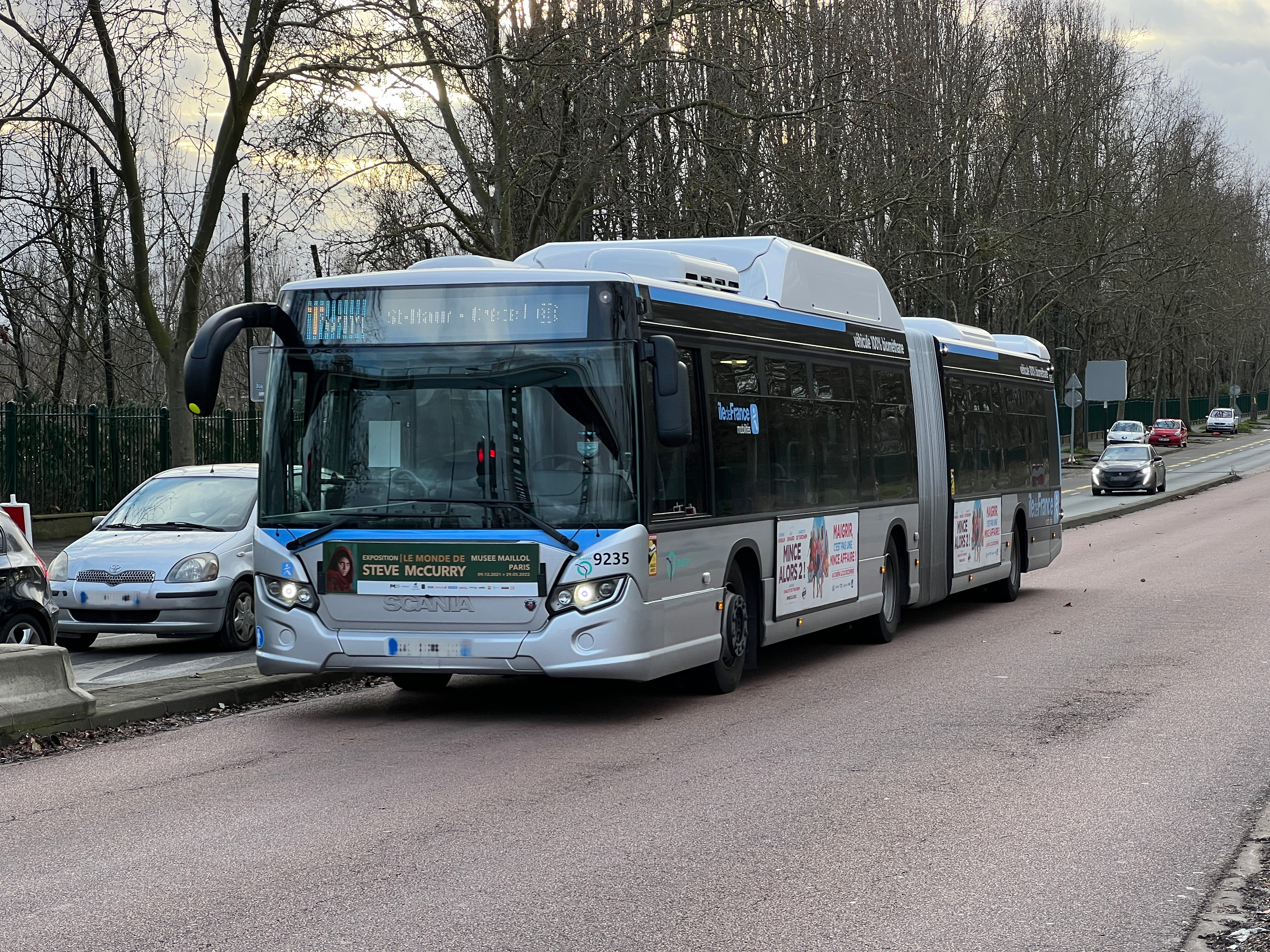
- A Tvm bus on Avenue de la Pompadour in Créteil.

Overview
- System: RATP bus network
- Operator: RATP Group
- Garage: Thiais
- Vehicles: 49 Scania Citywide (2023)
- Began service: 1 October 1993
- Predecessors: RATP line 392

Route
- Locale: Val-de-Marne
- Start: Saint-Maur–Créteil
- End: La Croix de Berny
- Length: 19.7 km (12.2 mi)
- Stops: 32

Service
- Journey time: 64 minutes
- Annual patronage: 23,000,000 (2019)
Route map
- (*) Under construction

The Trans-Val-de-Marne, often abbreviated as Tvm, is a bus rapid transit (BRT) line operated by the RATP Group as part of the RATP bus network in the Paris metropolitan area. The line entered service on 1 October 1993, running almost entirely in a dedicated lane. The line facilitates travel from suburb to suburb within the Val-de-Marne department in the Île-de-France region. It replaced the former RATP line 392, which since 1969 had linked Saint-Maur–Créteil station and Rungis.

The Tvm connects Saint-Maur–Créteil to La Croix de Berny, serving thirty-two stations over nearly twenty kilometres (12 mi). It has a special status since although it is a bus line, it is already administratively included by the RATP in the "T mode," alongside the tram lines.

It is the busiest bus line in Europe, with 23 million passengers in 2019.

== History ==
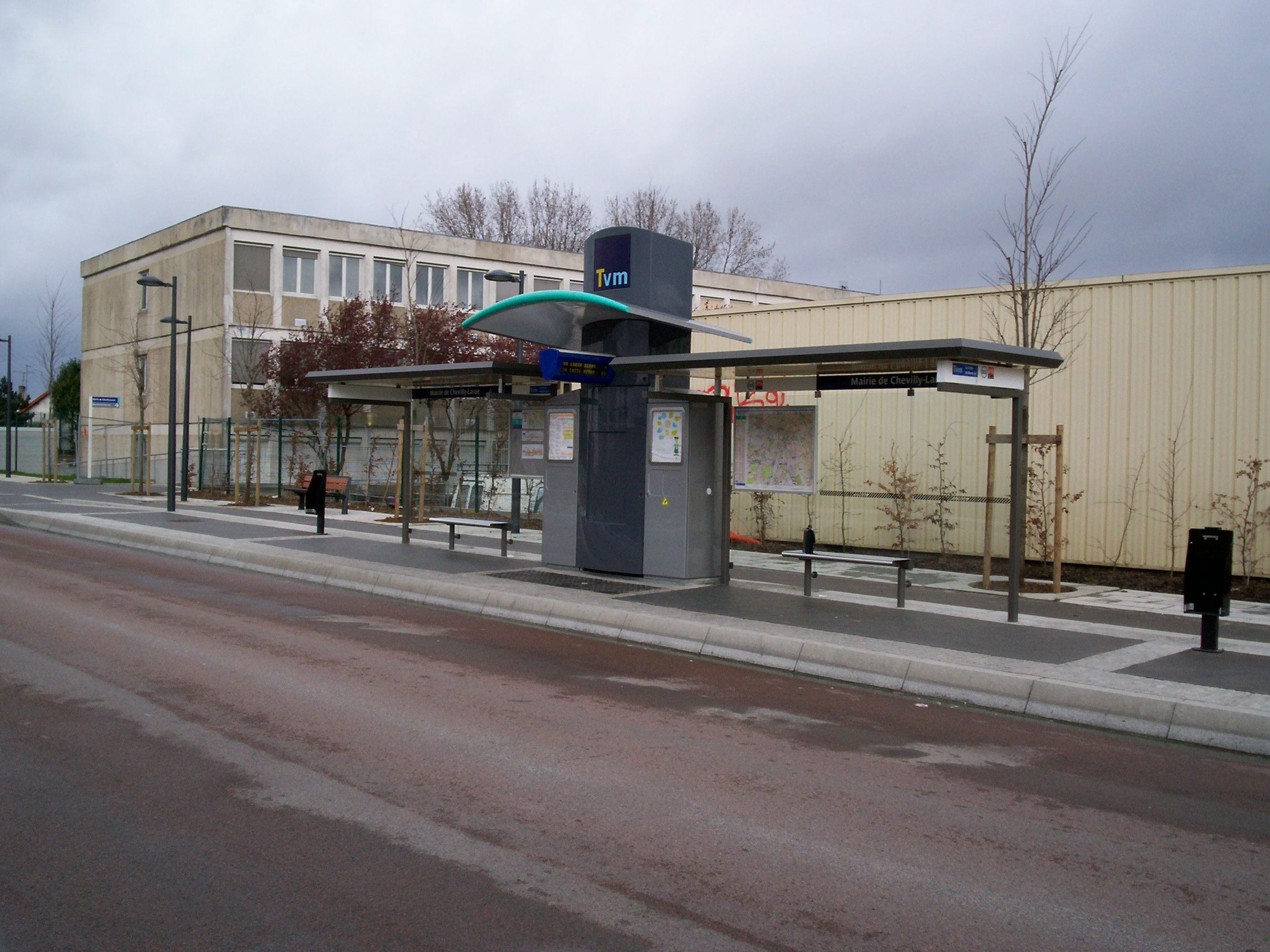
Typical Tvm station at Mairie de Chevilly-Larue, showing the red concrete dedicated bus lane

- 1976: First mentioned in planning documents
- 1980: Feasibility study conducted on the South Ring Road
- 1 October 1993: Entry into service between Marché international de Rungis and Saint-Maur–Créteil station
- 1997 to 2001: Experimentation with rubber-tyred tram models
- 21 July 2007: Extension to the west from Marché international de Rungis to La Croix de Berny station
