= Pont de Sèvres station =

Paris Metro station in Boulogne-Billancourt

Pont de Sèvres La Seine Musicale
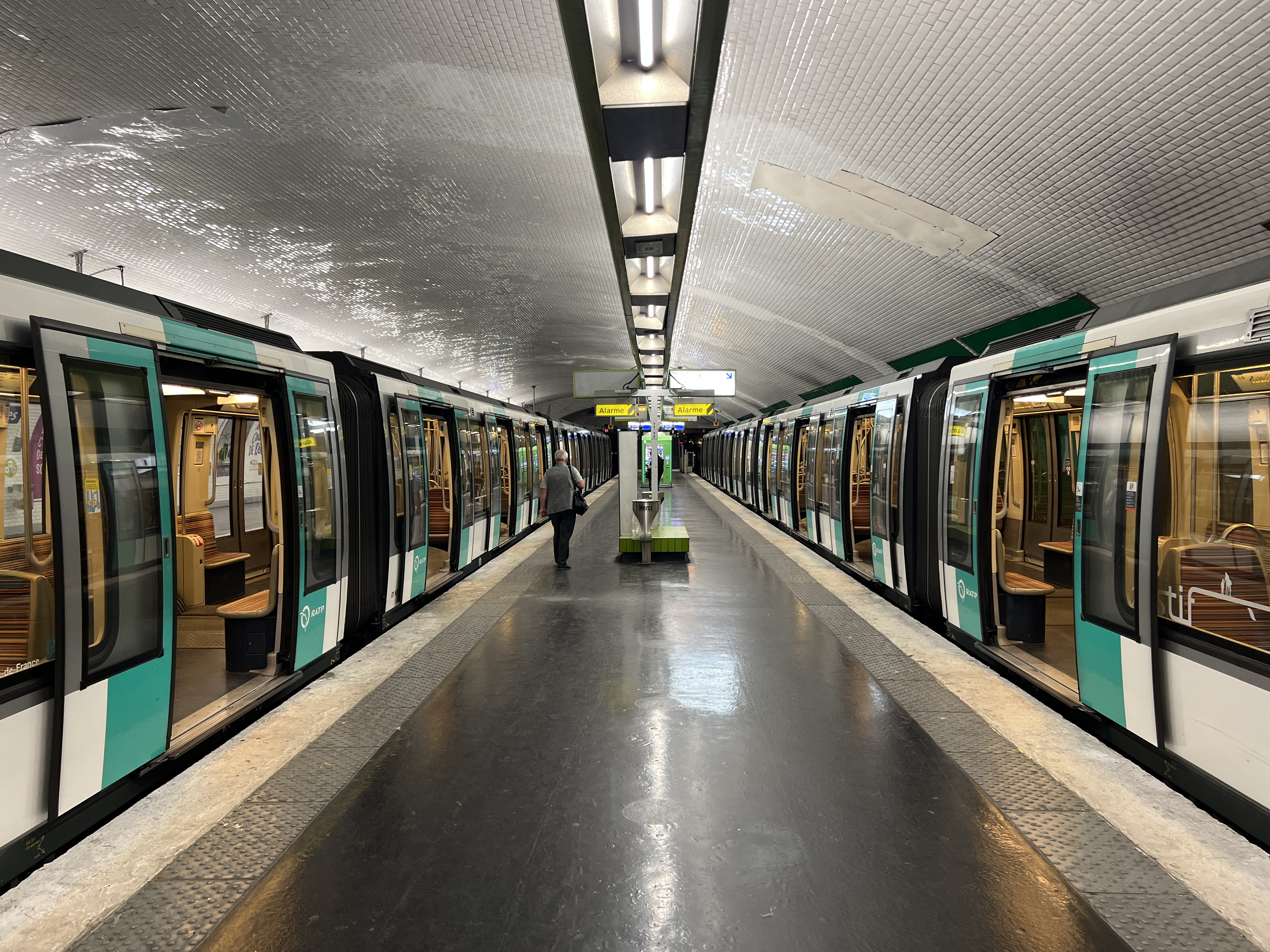
- MF 01 at Pont de Sèvres

General information
- Location: Boulogne-Billancourt; Île-de-France; France
- Coordinates: 48°49′47″N 2°13′52″E
- Operator: Line 9: RATP Group; Line 15: ORA (RATP Dev, Alstom & ComfortDelGro)
- Connections: Tramways in Île-de-France Île-de-France tramway Line 2

Construction
- Depth: Line 15: 29 m (95 ft)
- Accessible: Line 9: No; Line 15: Yes
- Architect: Line 15: Jean-Marie Duthilleul

Other information
- Station code: 28-10
- Fare zone: 1

History
- Opened: 3 February 1934

Passengers
- 3,430,203 (2021)

Services
Preceding station	Paris Metro	Following station
Terminus	Line 9	Billancourt towards Mairie de Montreuil
Preceding station	Tram	Following station
Parc de Saint-Cloud towards Pont de Bezons	T2	Brimborion towards Porte de Versailles

Future services
Preceding station	Paris Metro	Following station
Terminus	Line 15 (autumn 2027)	Issy towards Noisy–Champs
Saint-Cloud towards Champigny Centre	Line 15 (2031)	Issy towards Noisy–Champs
Location
- Location within Paris

Pont de Sèvres station (French pronunciation: [pɔ̃ d(ə) sɛvʁ]) is a station of the Paris Metro on Line 9, serving as its western terminus. It is located near the Pont de Sèvres, which is a bridge on the Seine connecting to Sèvres. By autumn 2027, it will also become the terminus of Line 15's southern section.

== History ==
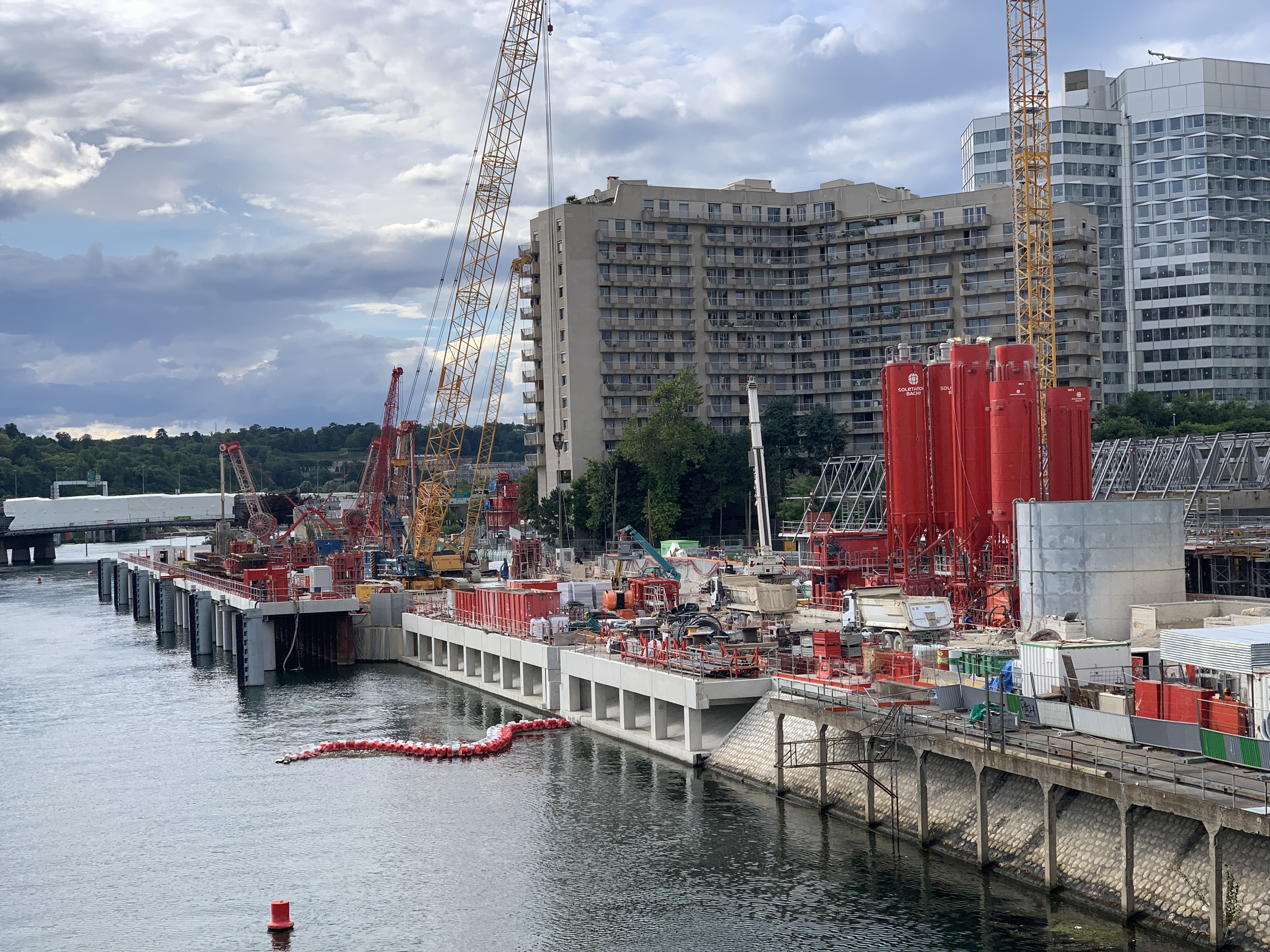
Construction of line 15's station at Pont de Sèvres in 2022

The station opened on 3 February 1934 with the extension from Porte de Saint-Cloud station. It was the first extension of the Metro network beyond the limits of Paris. Hence, it is one of the first three stations to provide service to the inner suburbs of Paris (along with Billancourt and Marcel Sembat).

In 1943, during an Allied air raid aimed at destroying the Renault factories at Boulogne-Billancourt (on Seguin Island), the bombs missed their targets and caused 300 deaths, including 80 around the station, partially destroying it.

In 2017, construction started on Line 15's station as part of the Grand Paris Express project. Line 15 will first begin service in autumn 2027 when Line 15 South opens, with the rest of the line opening in 2031. The underground station will be located on the bank of the Seine.

In 2019, the station was used by 5,048,247 passengers, making it the 79th busiest of the Metro network out of 302 stations.

In 2020, the station was used by 2,651,763 passengers amidst the COVID-19 pandemic, making it the 69th busiest of the Metro network out of 305 stations.

In 2021, the station was used by 3,430,203 passengers, making it the 83rd busiest of the Metro network out of 305 stations.

== Passenger services ==
=== Access ===
The station has 3 accesses:

- Access 1: Forum Pont de Sèvres Île Seguin
- Access 2: quai Alphonse Gallo Sous-Préfecture des Hauts-de-Seine
- Access 3: rue de Bellevue

=== Platforms ===
The station has a particular arrangement specific to the stations serving or had served as a terminus. It has three tracks and two platforms. The side platform serves as the arrival platform while the island platform serves as the departure platform. However, during off-peak hours, arriving trains may be directed to the island platform where the passengers can then get off. A luminous display on the platform indicates the side of the platform the next train will depart from.

=== Other connections ===
Since 2 July 1997, the station has been served by tramway T2 via the nearby Musée de Sèvres tram station on the Seine's left bank.

The station is also served by the following bus networks:

- RATP bus network: lines 169, 171, 179, 291, 426, and 467
- Vélizy Vallées bus network: lines 6140 and 6142
- Hourtoule bus network: line 17
- SAVAC bus network: line 39.34
- Noctilien: lines N12 and N61

== Nearby ==
Both the Manufacture nationale de Sèvres (National Ceramics Museum) and southeastern entrances to the Parc de Saint-Cloud through Allée Verte are located across the Pont de Sèvres. On the Avenue du Pavillon de Breteuil in the Parc de Saint-Cloud is the Pavillon de Breteuil, the headquarters of the International Bureau of Weights and Measures (BIPM).

In the Seine on Île Seguin is La Seine Musicale.

== Gallery ==
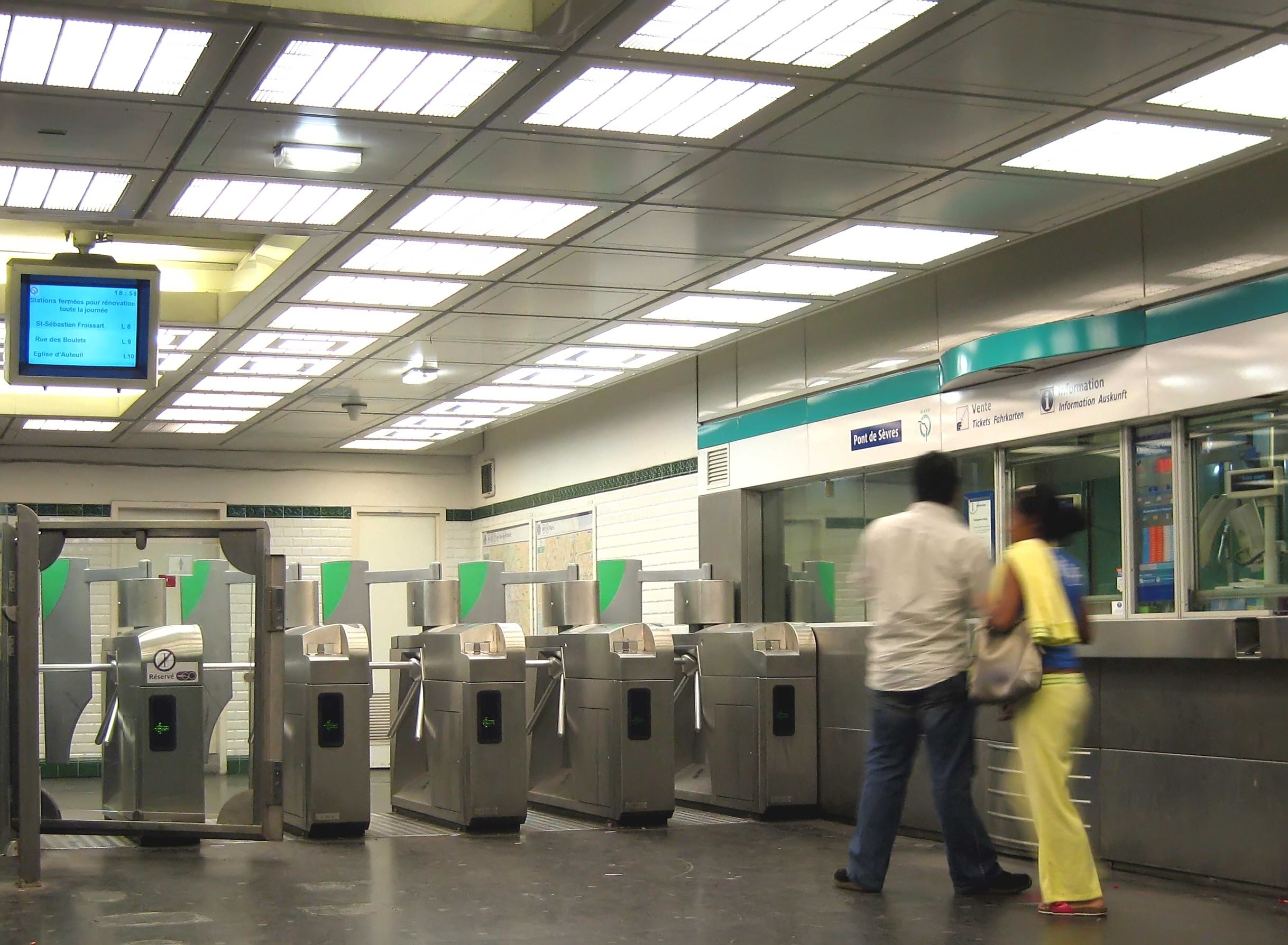
Mezzanine

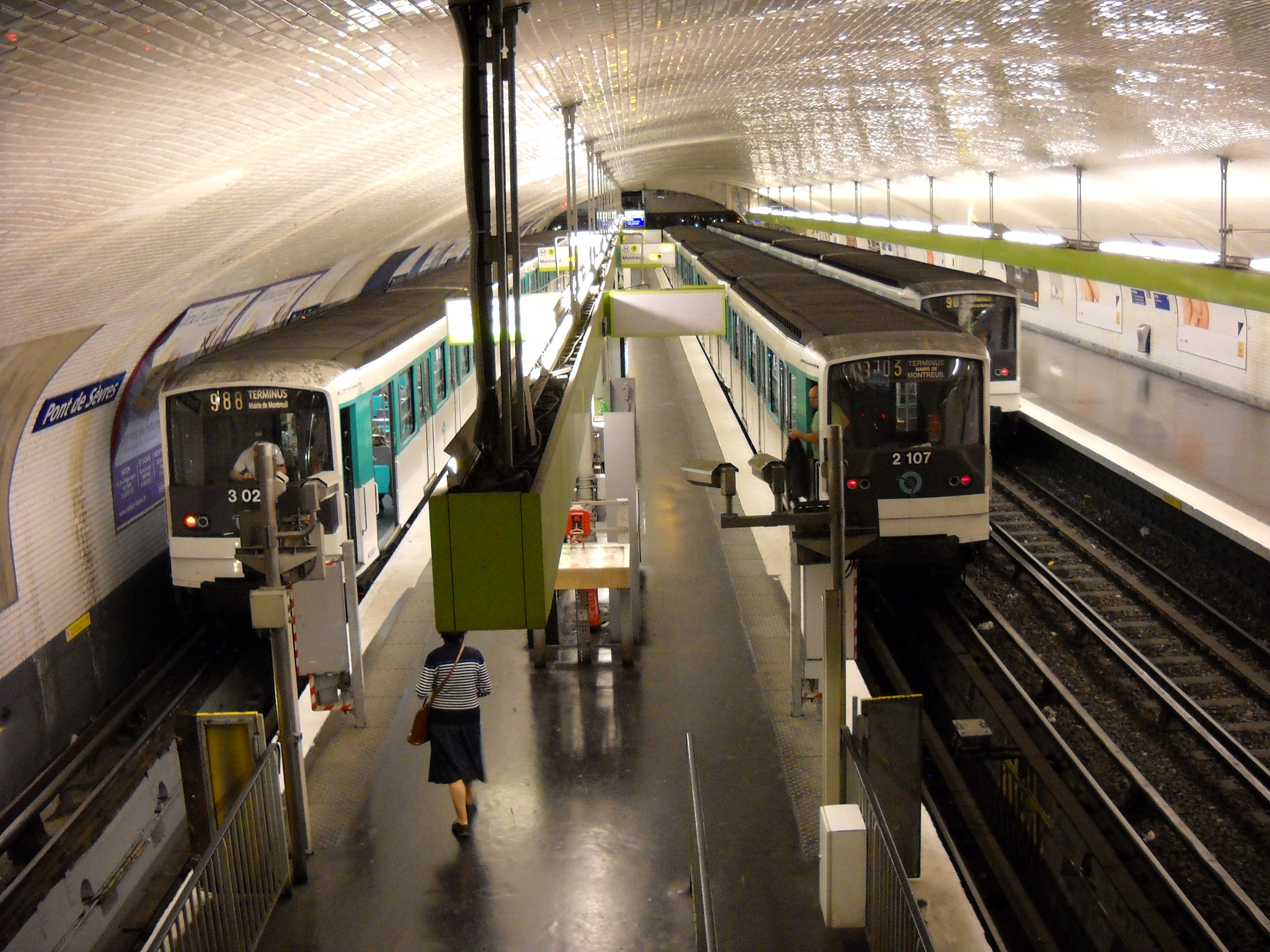
MF 67 at Pont de Sèvres prior to their replacement by MF 01.

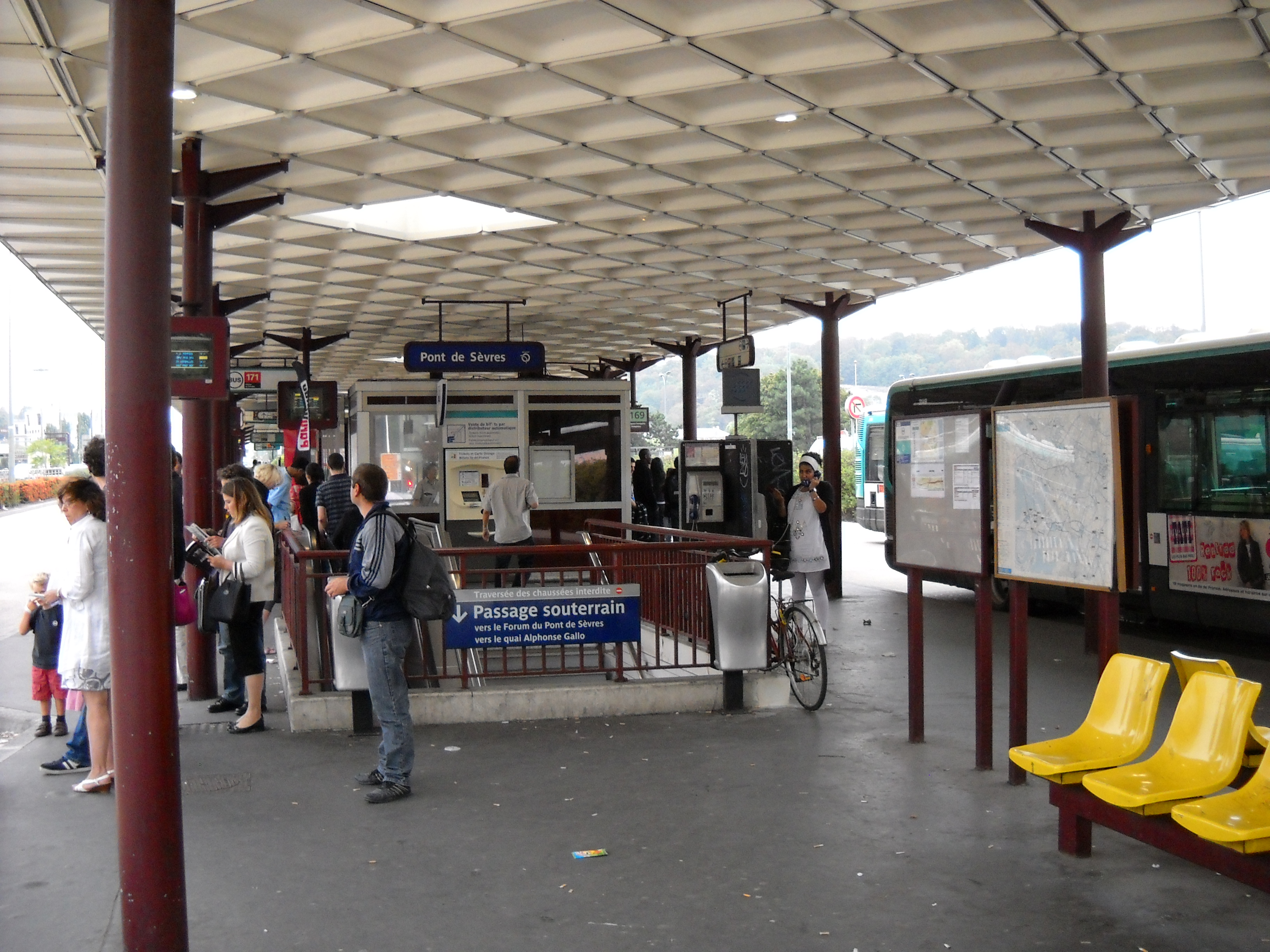
Access 1 leading to the bus station

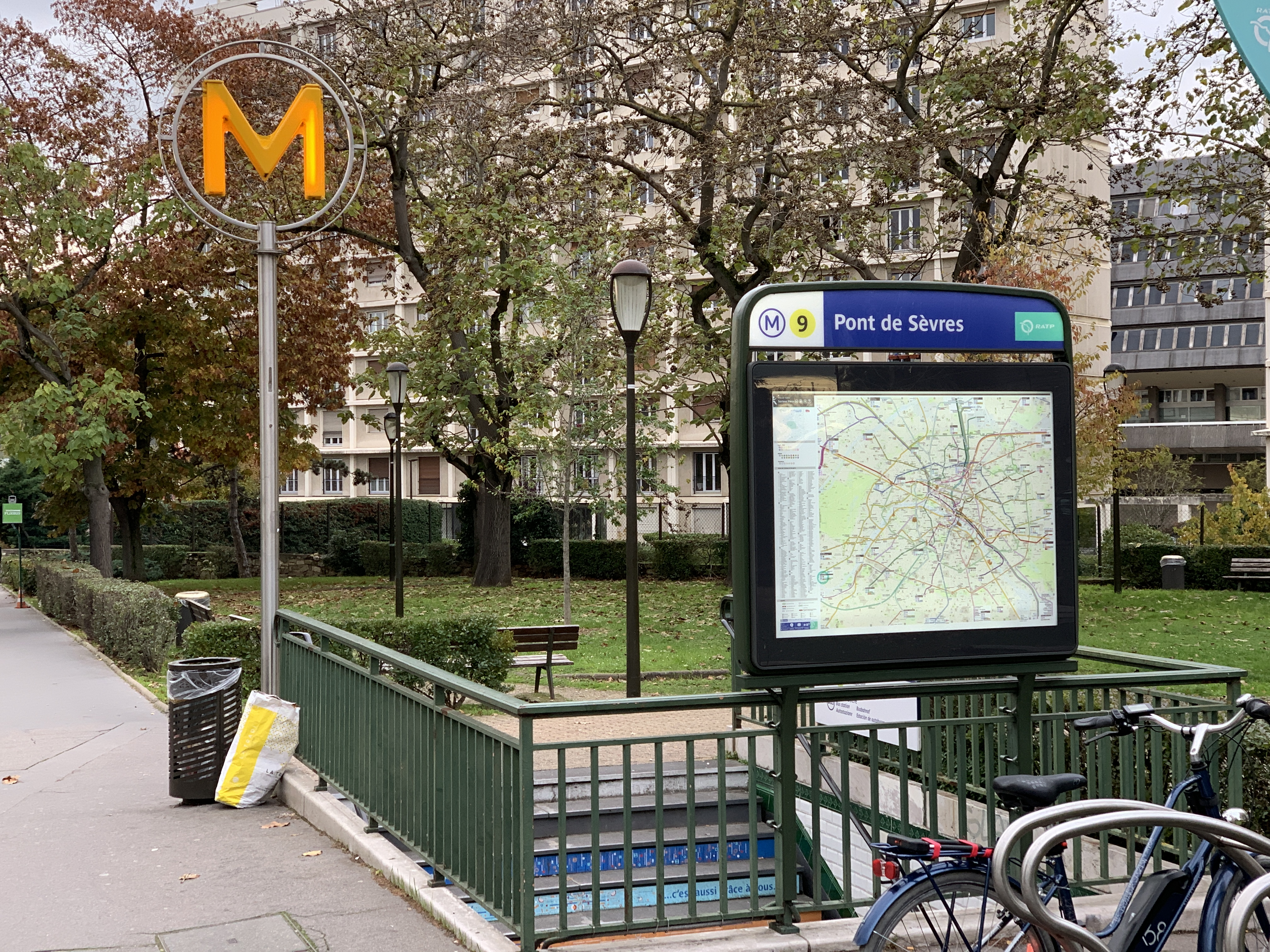
Access 2

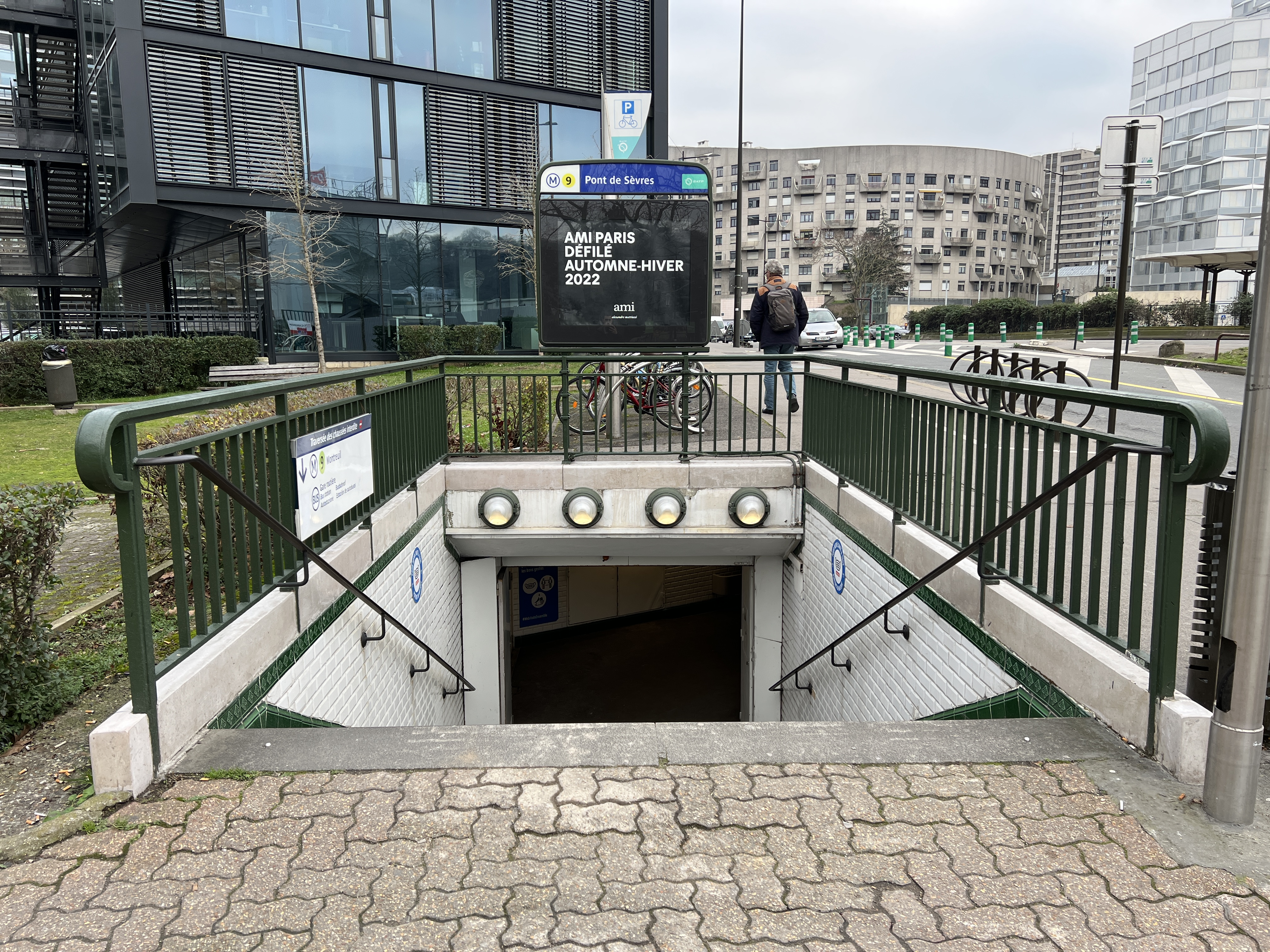
Access 3

MF 01 during his movement to depot.
