= Champigny-sur-Marne =

- Commune
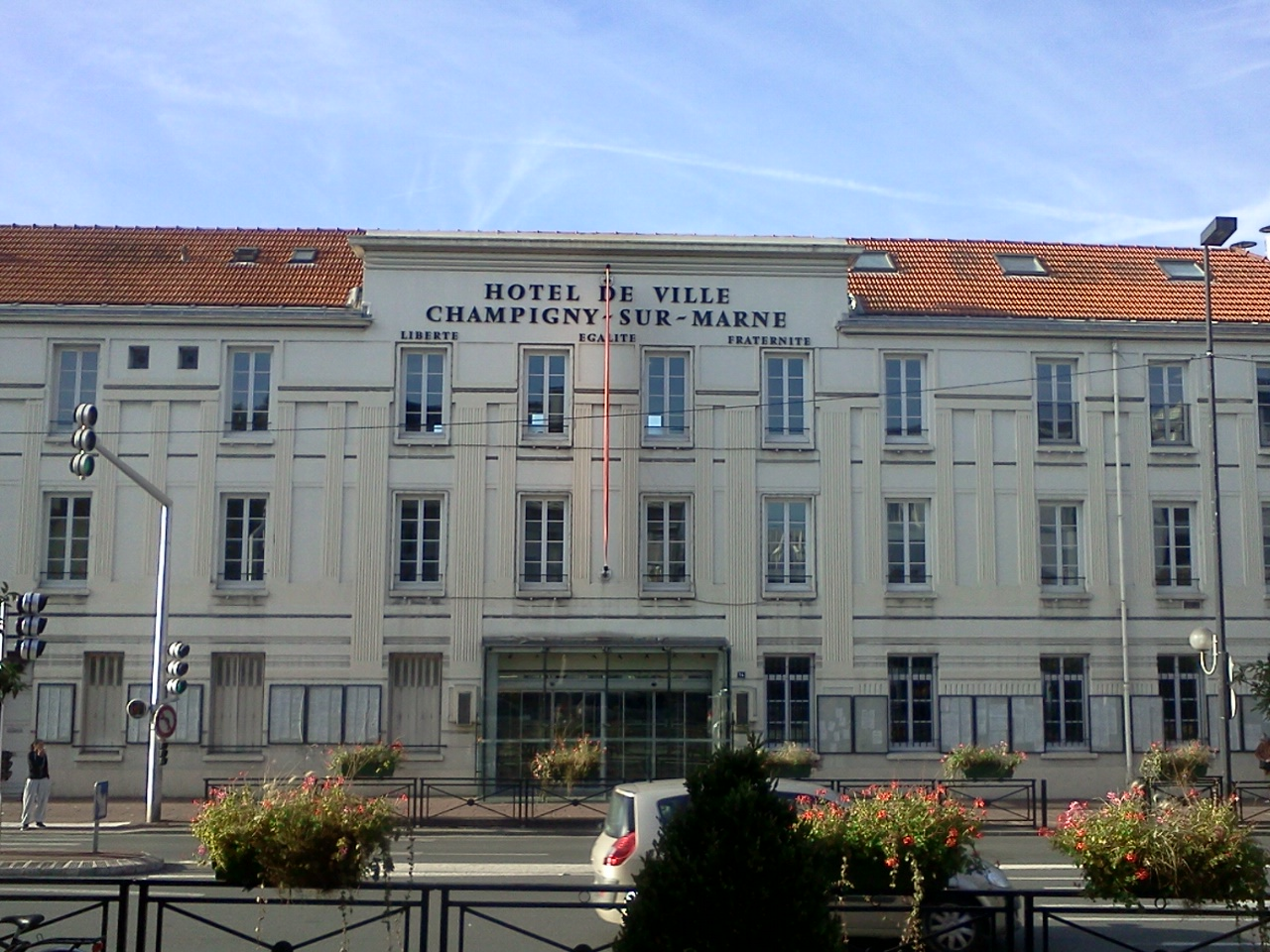
- The Hôtel de Ville

- Coat of arms

- Location (in red) within Paris inner suburbs
- Location of Champigny-sur-Marne
- Location within France Location within Île-de-France (region)
- Coordinates: 48°49′02″N 2°30′56″E
- Country: France
- Region: Île-de-France
- Department: Val-de-Marne
- Arrondissement: Nogent-sur-Marne
- Canton: Champigny-sur-Marne-1 and 2
- Intercommunality: Grand Paris

Government
  - Mayor (2026–32): Laurent Jeanne
- Area^{1}: 11.3 km^{2} (4.4 sq mi)
- Population (2023): 78,072
  - Density: 6,910/km^{2} (17,900/sq mi)
- Demonym: Campinois
- Time zone: UTC+01:00 (CET)
  - Summer (DST): UTC+02:00 (CEST)
- INSEE/Postal code: 94017 /94500
- ^{1} French Land Register data, which excludes lakes, ponds, glaciers > 1 km^{2} (0.386 sq mi or 247 acres) and river estuaries.

Champigny-sur-Marne (French pronunciation: [ʃɑ̃piɲi syʁ maʁn]; lit. 'Champigny-on-Marne') is a major city in the Île-de-France region, France. It is located 12.5 km (7.8 mi) east-southeast from the centre of Paris.

== Name ==
Champigny-sur-Marne was originally called simply Champigny. The name Champigny ultimately comes from Medieval Latin Campaniacum, meaning "estate of Campanius", a Gallo-Roman landowner.

In 1897 the name of the commune officially became Champigny-sur-Marne (meaning "Champigny upon Marne"), in order to distinguish it from other communes of France also called Champigny.

== History ==
The Hôtel de Ville was established as an orphanage operated by the Daughters of Charity of Saint Vincent de Paul and only opened for municipal use in 1931.

== Demographics ==
Historical population

Year	Pop.	±% p.a.
1793	1,434	—
1800	1,286	−1.54%
1806	1,210	−1.01%
1821	1,263	+0.29%
1831	1,434	+1.28%
1836	1,459	+0.35%
1841	1,533	+0.99%
1846	1,619	+1.10%
1851	1,610	−0.11%
1856	2,030	+4.75%
1861	1,944	−0.86%
1866	2,353	+3.89%
1872	2,190	−1.19%
1876	2,813	+6.46%
1881	3,084	+1.86%
1886	3,896	+4.79%
1891	4,624	+3.49%
1896	5,302	+2.77%
1901	6,655	+4.65%

Year	Pop.	±% p.a.
1906	8,555	+5.15%
1911	10,426	+4.04%
1921	13,571	+2.67%
1926	20,289	+8.38%
1931	27,450	+6.23%
1936	28,883	+1.02%
1946	30,239	+0.46%
1954	36,903	+2.52%
1962	57,876	+5.79%
1968	70,419	+3.32%
1975	80,291	+1.89%
1982	76,176	−0.75%
1990	79,486	+0.53%
1999	74,237	−0.76%
2007	74,909	+0.11%
2012	75,869	+0.26%
2017	77,630	+0.46%
2023	78,072	+0.09%

Source: EHESS and INSEE (1968-2023)

=== Immigration ===
Place of birth of residents of Champigny-sur-Marne in 1999
Born in metropolitan France	Born outside metropolitan France			
77.0%	23.0%			
77.0%	Born in overseas France	Born in foreign countries with French citizenship at birth^{1}	EU-15 immigrants^{2}	Non-EU-15 immigrants
77.0%	2.3%	3.0%	7.5%	10.2%
^{1} This group is made up largely of former French settlers, such as pieds-noirs in Northwest Africa, followed by former colonial citizens who had French citizenship at birth (such as was often the case for the native elite in French colonies), as well as to a lesser extent foreign-born children of French expatriates. A foreign country is understood as a country not part of France in 1999, so a person born for example in 1950 in Algeria, when Algeria was an integral part of France, is nonetheless listed as a person born in a foreign country in French statistics.^{2} An immigrant is a person born in a foreign country not having French citizenship at birth. An immigrant may have acquired French citizenship since moving to France, but is still considered an immigrant in French statistics. On the other hand, persons born in France with foreign citizenship (the children of immigrants) are not listed as immigrants.

== Transport ==
Champigny-sur-Marne is served by Les Boullereaux – Champigny station on Paris RER line E.

Champigny-sur-Marne is also served by Champigny station on Paris RER line A. This station, although administratively located on the territory of the neighboring commune of Saint-Maur-des-Fossés, lies immediately across the river Marne from the town center of Champigny-sur-Marne and is thus used by people in Champigny.

The Paris Métro is planned to eventually serve the center of Champigny; the new station will be located along RN4, near the railway bridge known as Pont de la Plage.

== Education ==
Primary schools:

- Preschools: Nine for the 9^{e} circonscription and 7 for the 18^{e} circonscription
- Elementary schools: Seven for the 9^{e} circonscription and 6 for the 18^{e} circonscription

Secondary schools:

- Junior high schools: Collège Willy-Ronis and Collège Paul-Vaillant-Couturier
- Senior high schools: Lycée Louise Michel, Lycée Marx-Dormoy, Lycée Langevin-Wallon, Lycée professionnel Gabriel-Péri

In addition Lycée professionnel et technologique Samuel-de-Champlain is in nearby Chennevières-sur-Marne

== Notable people ==
- Djamel Belmadi (born 27 March 1976) is a retired Algerian footballer and was most recently manager of the Algeria National Football Team.
- Jeff Reine-Adélaïde (born 17 January 1998) is a professional footballer, currently plays as a midfielder most recently for Italian club Salernitana.
- Yan Valery (born 22 February 1999) is a French-Tunisian professional footballer, currently plays as a right-back for Sheffield Wednesday.
- Adrien Regattin (born 22 August 1991) is a Moroccan professional footballer, currently plays as a midfielder for Turkish club Iğdır.
- Samuel Benchetrit (born 26 June 1973) is a French writer, actor, scenarist and director[1]. He is of Moroccan-Jewish descent.
- Nicolas Senzemba (born 25 March 1996) is a French footballer who currently plays for Le Touquet.
- Cyréna Samba-Mayela (born 31 October 2000) is a French athlete who competes in the 60 metres hurdles and 100 metres hurdles. She won the gold medal in the 60 m hurdles at the 2022 World Indoor Championships. French national record to 7.73 seconds. At the 2024 Summer Olympics, Samba-Mayela won a silver medal in the 100 m hurdles event.
- James Ruffier (born 20 February 1974) is a French racing driver

== International relations ==
Champigny-sur-Marne is twinned with:

- Alpiarça, Portugal
- Bernau bei Berlin, Germany
- Jalapa, Nicaragua
- Musselburgh, Scotland, United Kingdom
- Rosignano Marittimo, Italy

== See also ==
- Communes of the Val-de-Marne department
