= Noisy–Champs station =

Railway station in France

Noisy–Champs Champy–Nesles
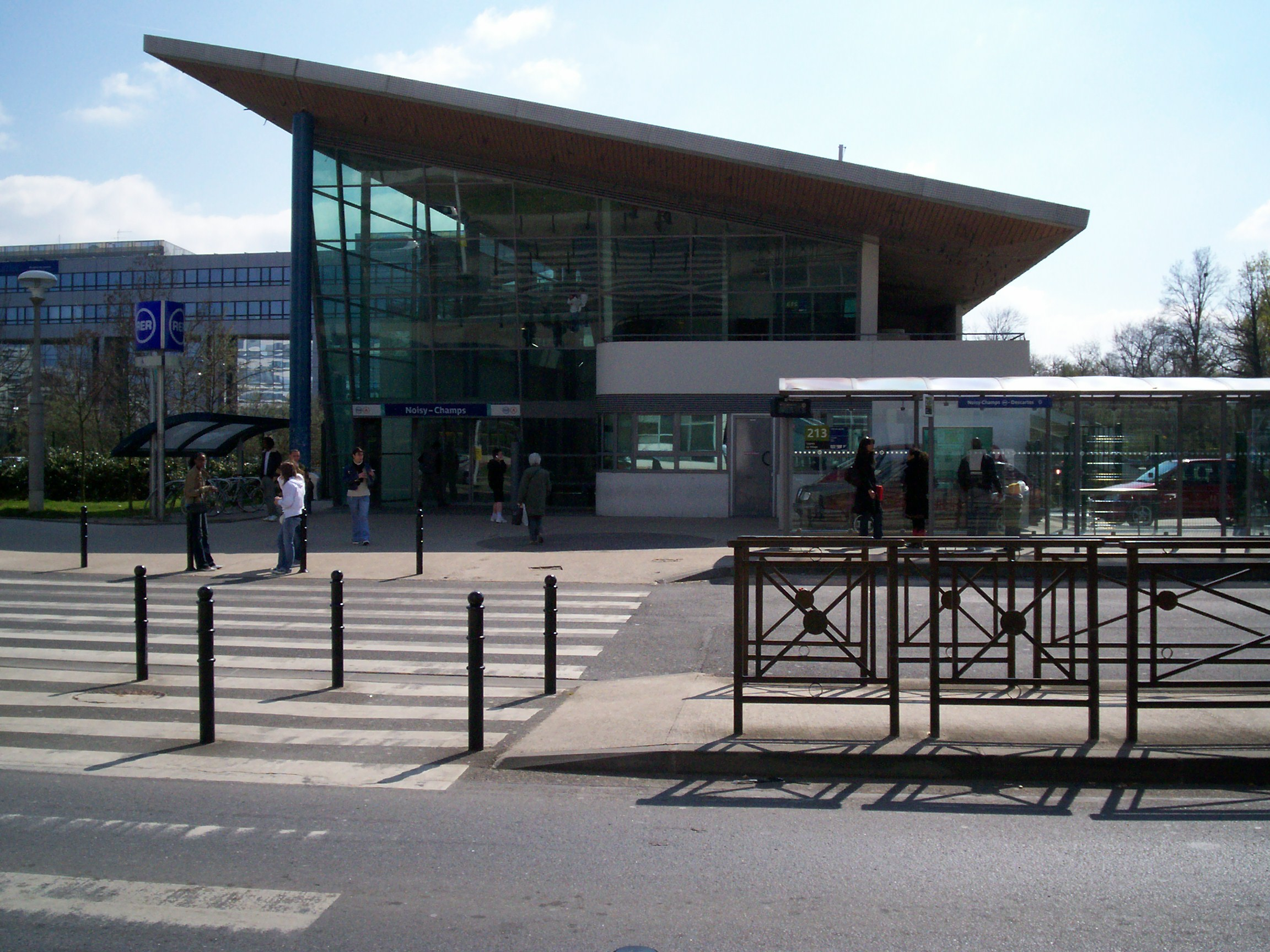
- North entrance of the station, Descartes side

General information
- Location: France
- Coordinates: 48°50′34″N 2°34′48″E
- Operator: RATP Group
- Platforms: 2 side platforms
- Tracks: 2
- Connections: RATP Bus: 212 213 310 312 320; Transdev Lys: 100; Noctilien: N130

Construction
- Structure type: Below-grade
- Parking: 318 spaces
- Accessible: Yes, by request to staff

Other information
- Station code: 87758342
- Fare zone: 4

History
- Opened: 19 December 1980

Passengers
- 2019: 5,614,935

Services
Preceding station	RER	Following station
Noisy-le-Grand – Mont d'Est towards Cergy-le-Haut	RER A	Noisiel towards Marne-la-Vallée–Chessy

Future services
Preceding station	Paris Metro	Following station
Villiers–Champigny–Bry towards Pont de Sèvres	Line 15 (late 2026)	Terminus
Chelles–Gournay towards Saint-Denis–Pleyel	Line 16 (2028)	Terminus
Location

Noisy–Champs (French pronunciation: [nwazi ʃɑ̃]) is a railway station on the RER train network at the border between Champs-sur-Marne, Seine-et-Marne and Noisy-le-Grand, Seine-Saint-Denis, France. Starting in autumn 2027, the station will also become a part of the Paris Metro network, initially serving lines 15 and 16 and perhaps Line 11 in the distant future.

== Description ==
The station opened on 19 December 1980, when RER Line A was extended to Torcy. It serves the Descartes campus of the University of Paris-Est Marne-la-Vallée. Bus stations are on both ends of platforms: Champy is on Noisy-le-Grand side, Descartes on the Champs-sur-Marne side.

As of 2019, the estimated annual attendance by the RATP Group was 5,614,935 passengers.

== Service ==
=== RER A ===
The average frequency is one train every 10 minutes to Paris and to Marne-la-Vallée–Chessy station (however, some trains terminate at Torcy station towards the east-side of the line).

=== Bus connections ===
The station is served at both ends by several buses:

- On the west side at the stop called Noisy–Champs RER – Champy:
  - RATP Bus:
    - 310 (to Les Yvris–Noisy-le-Grand)
    - 320 (circular line serving several districts in Noisy-le-Grand)
- On the east side at the stop called Noisy–Champs RER – Descartes:
  - RATP Bus:
    - 212 (to Emerainville and Pontault-Combault)
    - 213 (to Chelles and to Lognes)
    - 312 (circular line serving the campus and its vicinities)
  - Transdev Lys (by Setra):
    - 100 (at remote bus stops called Crous & Ampère) (between Créteil and Torcy)
  - Noctilien:
    - N130 (between Paris (Gare de Lyon) and Marne-la-Vallée–Chessy - Disneyland)

== Metro service ==
Noisy-Champs will soon become a station on the Paris Metro as part of the Grand Paris Express project. The station will serve as the terminus for Line 15 starting in autumn 2027 and Line 16 starting in 2028.

A project to extend Line 11 to Noisy-Champs has been proposed, although this has been postponed indefinitely.

== Gallery ==
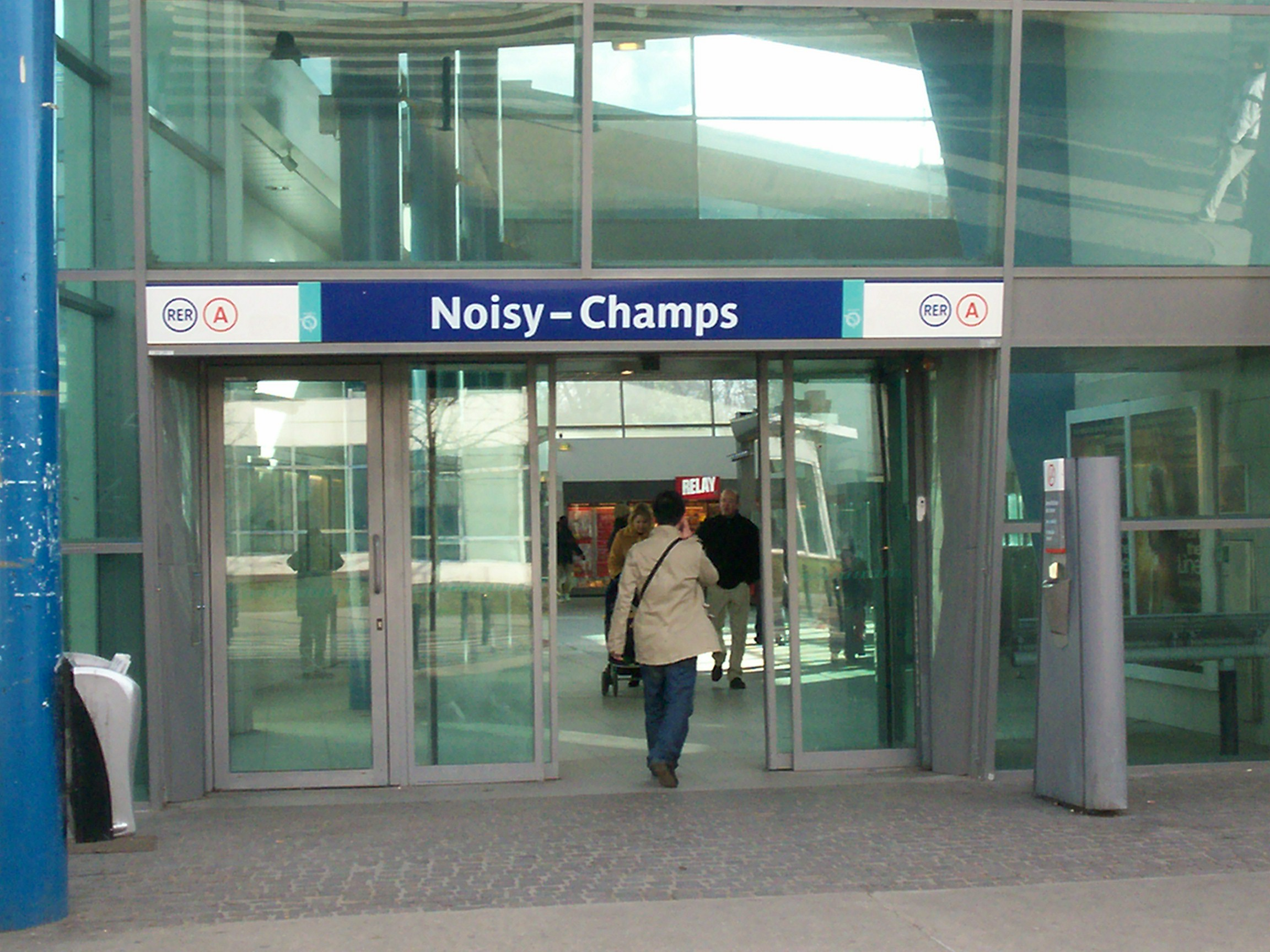
East side (Descartes) entrance

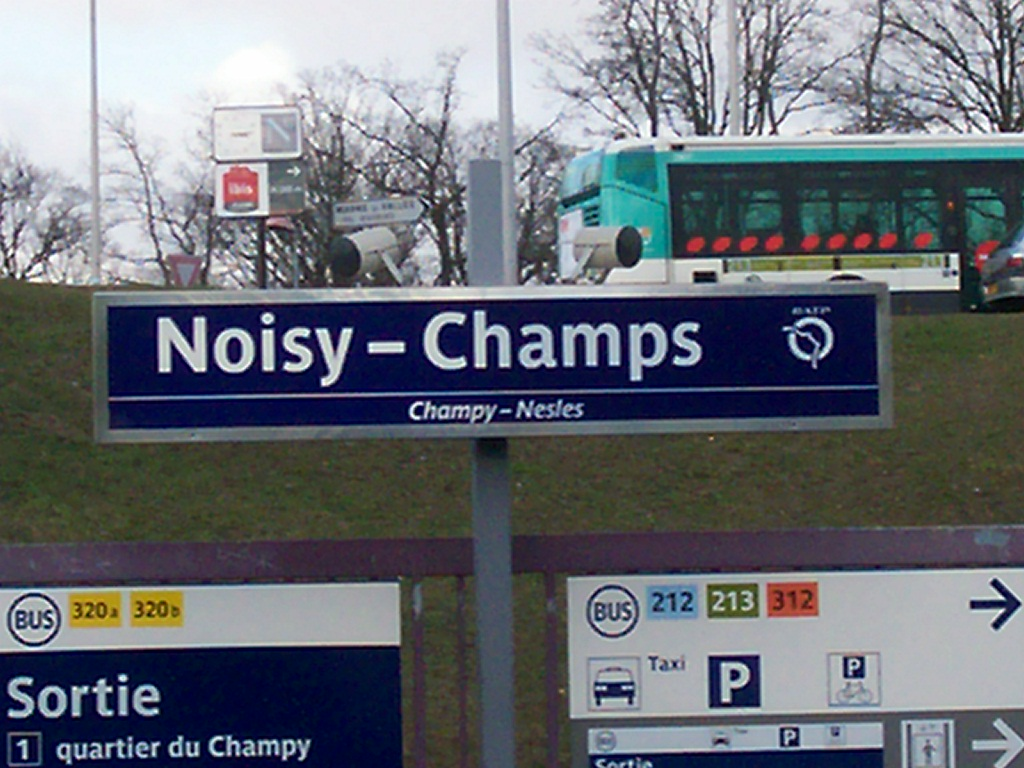
Sign indicating the name of the station
(with a bus of line 213 in the background)

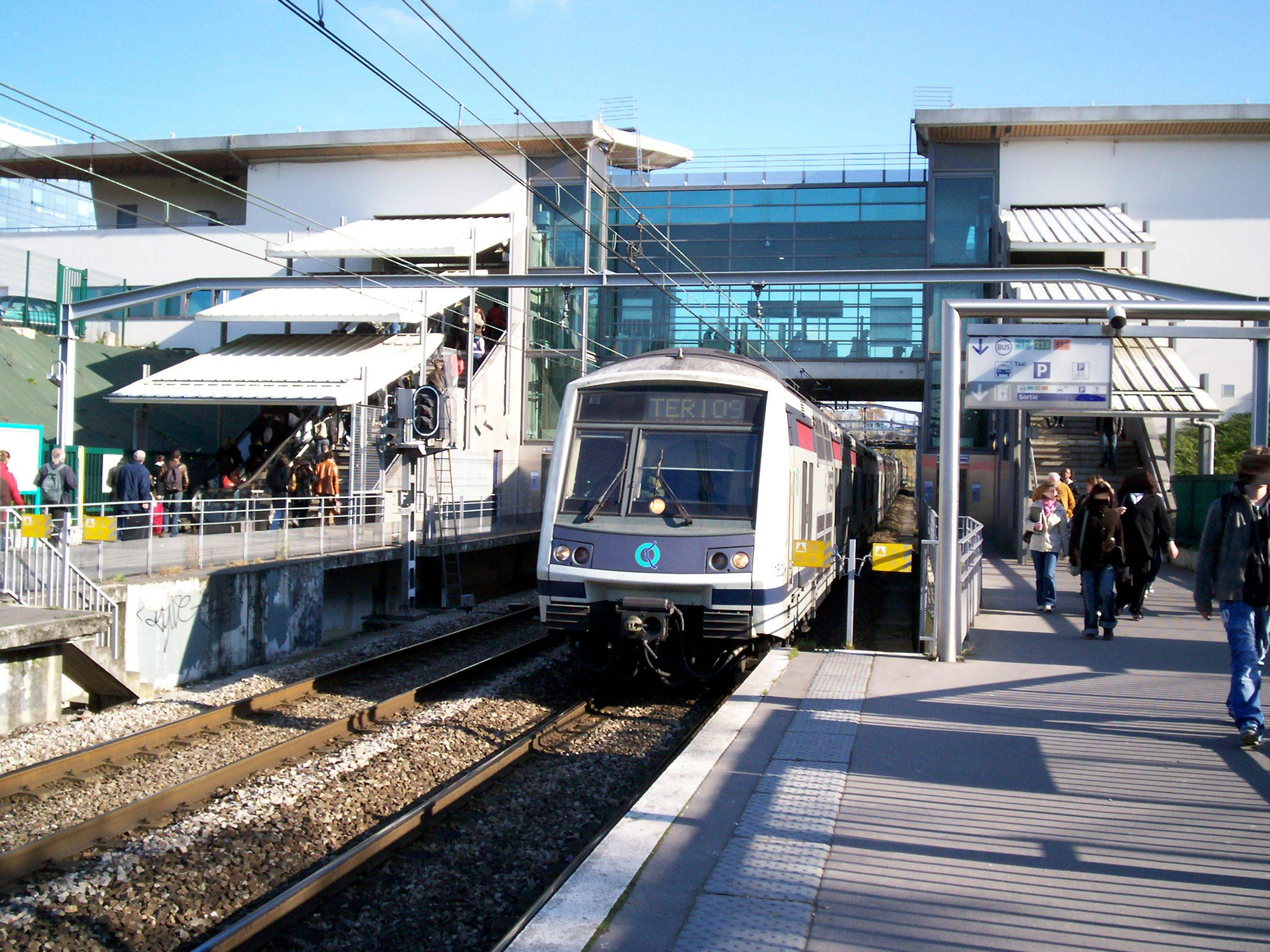
A train (MI2N) arriving at the station
(towards Paris)

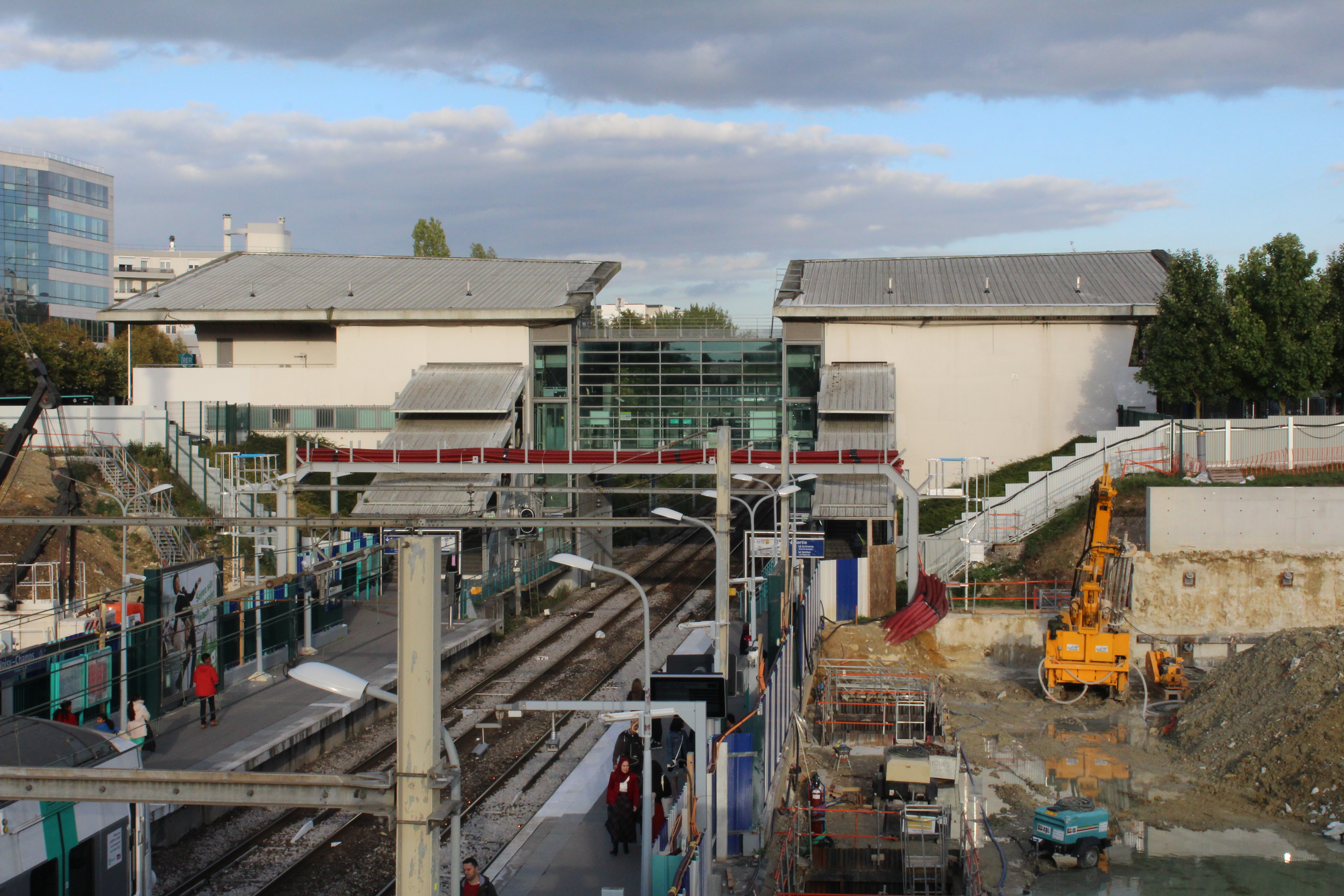
General view to the east (with the construction site of the Grand Paris Express on the right)

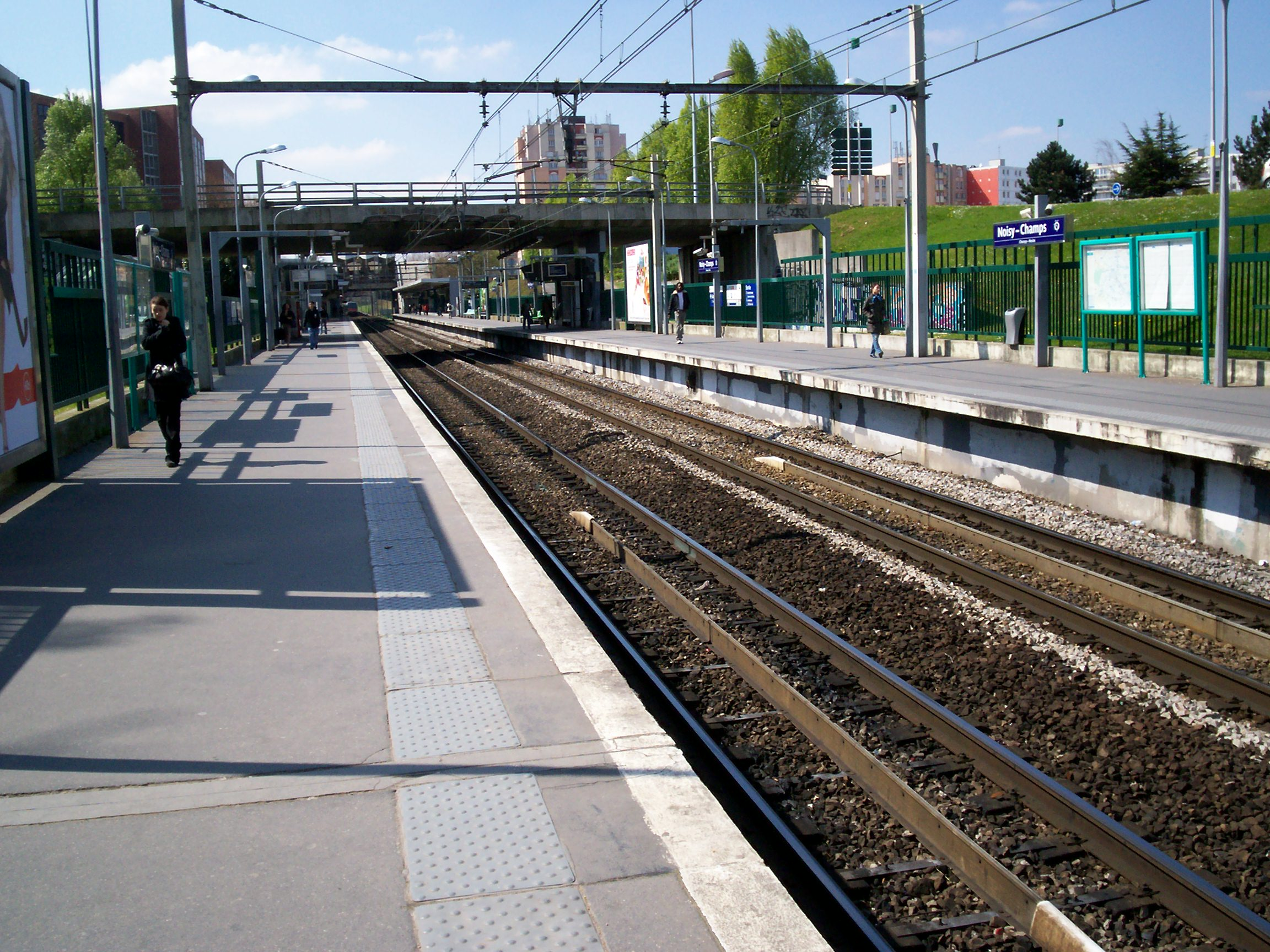
General view to the west (towards Paris)

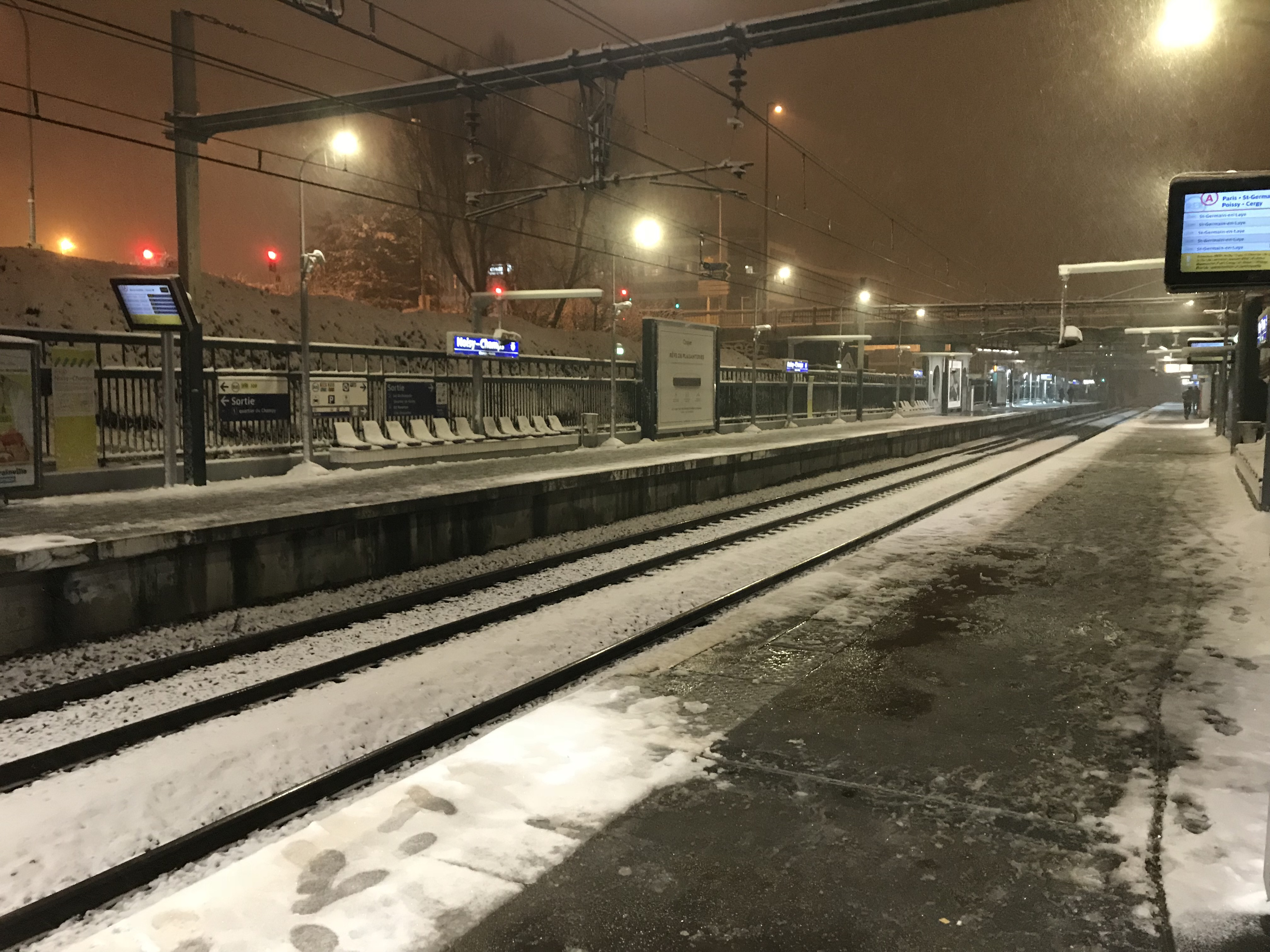
General view during a winter night

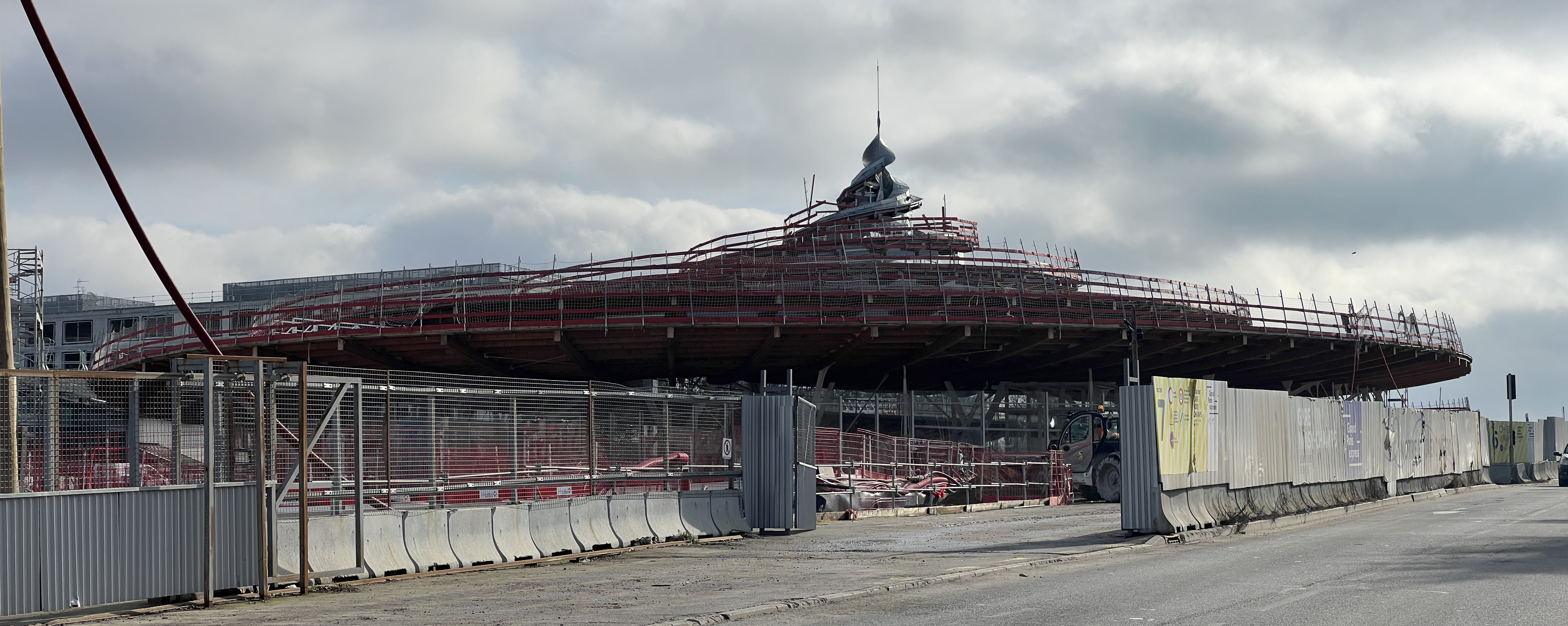
Future Paris Metro building, opening in autumn 2027.

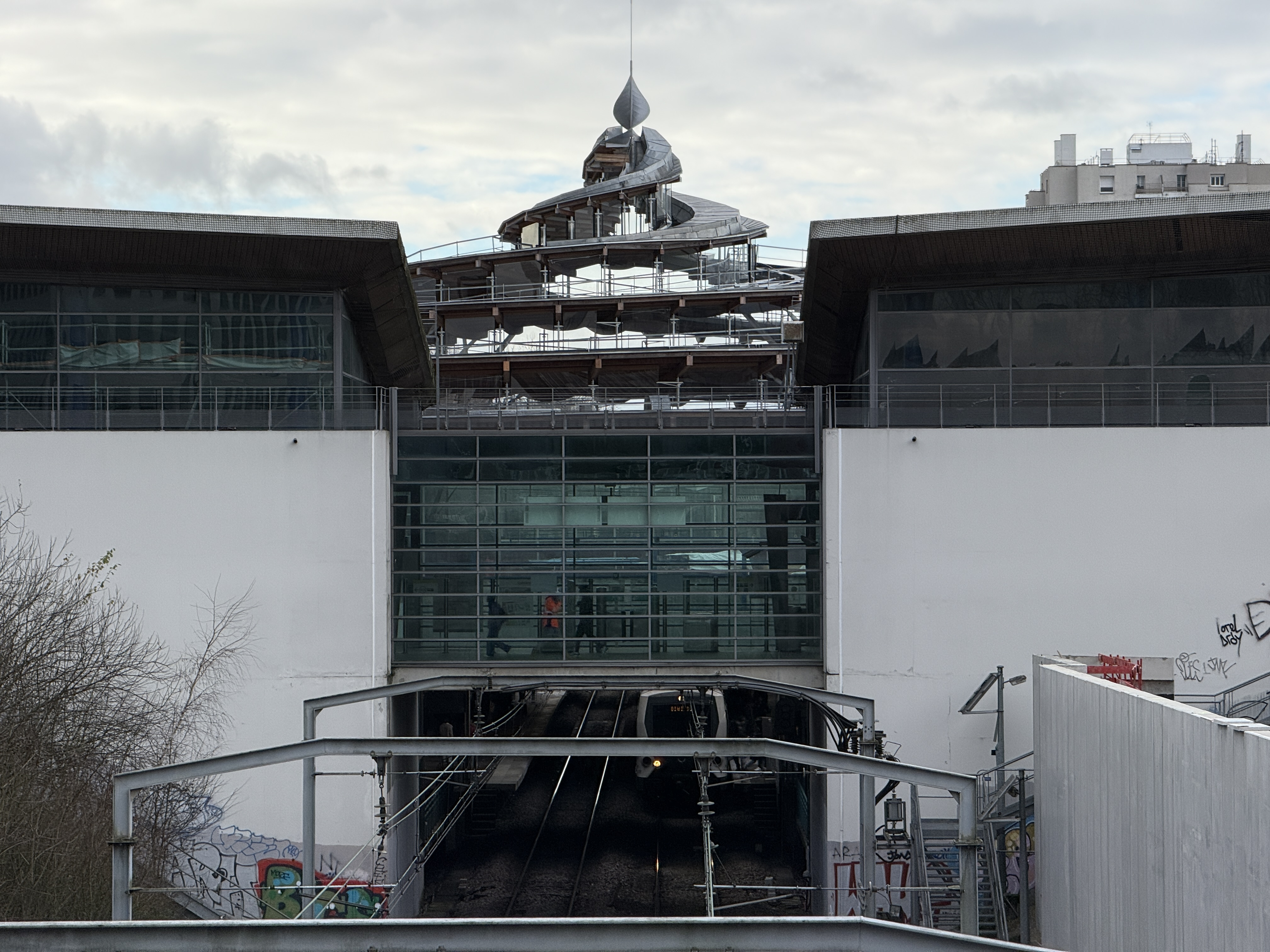
View of both buildings next to each other
