= Triangle de Gonesse =

Area in Gonesse, France

Triangle de Gonesse is an area of Gonesse commune, Val-d'Oise department, located to the north of Paris. It is notable for having been the site of protests objecting to the development of the largely rural area, particularly the ongoing construction of Gonesse station as part of the future Paris Metro Line 17, as well as the proposed EuropaCity planned development.

== Gonesse station protest ==
From 7 to 23 February 2021, activists established and occupied a Zone to Defend in the area, demanding the cancellation of plans to build the Gonesse metro station. Protestors argued that the station, which was to be constructed in the middle of a field, threatened several hectares of farmland and would lead to the development of the entire 280-hectare tract. According to the activists, the area occupied was the property of the Établissement public foncier d'Île-de-France, an établissement public à caractère industriel et commercial (a type of French quango) tasked with expropriating and developing land on behalf of the Île-de-France region. The zone was cleared by police, without incident, in order to permit the resumption of work on the site.

On 25 March 2022, the Cergy-Pontoise administrative court dismissed a challenge brought by nine environmental groups against the granting of the building permit for the station. In October 2022, the decision was upheld by the Conseil d'État.

== Territorial disputes ==
The north and west sections of Triangle de Gonesse are administratively located in the department of Val-d'Oise, while the southern section extends into Seine-Saint-Denis. While several municipalities within Seine-Saint-Denis publicly opposed the development of the site, the Departmental Council of Val-d'Oise supported the project on the grounds that it would create jobs and support businesses in the area. Opinions within the local communes are mixed, given the complex potential impacts of such an initiative. A lack of local consultations was noted by the Commission nationale du débat publique, who in a June 2018 report also criticised the piecemeal approach taken with the several projects (EuropaCity, the development zone, and the metro station) being built within the full 270 hectare area.

The area is also located within the Île-de-France region, but outside the Grand Paris municipal boundary; it was nonetheless the subject of a 2017 edition of a journal for development projects in the developing Grand Paris region, which called for submissions for the use of a 35 hectare site that would be integrated with the EuropaCity complex, the Triangle de Gonesse development zone, and the Gonesse metro station. The development of the station is taking place as part of the Grand Paris Express transit project; line 17 was reportedly planned to pass through Triangle de Gonesse, en route to Paris Charles de Gaulle Airport, specifically in order to take advantage of such a "blank slate" for development. The Paris government thus supports the project, while the Île-de-France regional authority has not taken an official stance.
