= Grand Paris Express =

Rapid transit project in Île-de-France

- The planned network of the Grand Paris Express

Overview
- Owner: Société des Grands Projets
- Locale: Île-de-France
- Transit type: Rapid transit
- Number of lines: 6 (4 new lines, 2 extended lines)
- Number of stations: 68

Operation
- Began operation: 24 June 2024 (Line 14 extension)
- Operators: RATP for lines 11 and 14; ORA (RATP Dev, Alstom, ComfortDelGro) for Line 15 south Keolis for lines 16, 17 and 18

Technical
- System length: 200 km (120 mi)
- Track gauge: 1,435 mm (4 ft 8 1/2 in) standard gauge

The Grand Paris Express (French: [ɡʁɑ̃ paʁi ɛkspʁɛs]; GPE) is a megaproject under construction that comprises new rapid transit lines and extensions of existing lines in the Île-de-France region of France. The project consists of four new lines for the Paris Metro, plus extensions of the existing lines 11 and 14. A total of 200 kilometres (120 mi) of new track and 68 new stations are to be added, serving a projected 2 million passengers a day. It is Europe's largest public transport project. The lines are being built by the Société des Grands Projets (SGP, known until 2023 as the Société du Grand Paris) and will be run by operators chosen by Île-de-France Mobilités, the region's transport authority.

The new lines were originally designated by colour (Red Line, Pink Line, Green Line, Blue Line), but this was changed in 2013 to continue the numbering convention of the Paris Metro. They are therefore now known as lines 15, 16, 17 and 18. The lines are opening in stages between June 2024, when the Line 14 extensions were completed, and 2031.

== History ==
=== Predecessors ===
Paris had orbital railways before it had a metro: the Petite Ceinture inside the city walls, built from 1852 to 1869 with 40% of underground sections for merchandise transport, then passengers service from 14 July 1862 beginning on the north and east section of Clichy-Bercy with underground parts, and the Grande Ceinture, finished in 1886 further out. Both lost their passengers as the radial metro and the car spread, and regional plans of 1965 and 1976 that proposed new orbital links in the inner suburbs were never carried out, with funding going instead to the radial RER lines. The idea returned in the 1990s with the Orbitale inner-ring proposal, and again in 2006, when the Val-de-Marne department launched its Orbival campaign and the RATP sketched a 50-kilometre orbital metro called Métrophérique. These fed into Arc Express, the orbital metro adopted by the regional council in its 2008 regional plan.

=== Planning and approval ===
In April 2009, President Nicolas Sarkozy announced a competing state project as part of the Grand Paris initiative: an automated "double loop" metro of about 130 kilometres (81 mi), designed by his secretary of state Christian Blanc. The Grand Paris law of 3 June 2010 created the Société du Grand Paris to build it.

The state scheme and the region's Arc Express went through simultaneous public debates in late 2010, and on 26 January 2011 the state and the region signed a protocol merging them under the name Grand Paris Express. The resulting master plan was adopted by the SGP board in May 2011 and approved by decree on 24 August 2011.

=== Nouveau Grand Paris and delays ===
A December 2012 report by Pascal Auzannet found the approved scheme unaffordable as planned. In March 2013 the government of Jean-Marc Ayrault recast it as the "Nouveau Grand Paris": the routes were kept, but the lines were reorganised, train sizes matched to forecast traffic, and the lines given their current numbers. Construction of the first section, Line 15 South from Pont de Sèvres to Noisy–Champs, began in 2015 after a public inquiry held in late 2013.

The timetable has been revised repeatedly. Prime Minister Édouard Philippe announced a rescheduled roadmap in February 2018 after costs escalated, and further slippages were announced in February and December 2025; Line 15 South, once expected around 2020, is now due in early 2027 at best.

== Network ==
=== Objectives ===
The network is designed for direct suburb-to-suburb journeys that bypass central Paris. It is also intended to bring high-capacity transit to isolated, economically weak districts and to relieve the most crowded existing lines: forecasts predict a 20 to 30 per cent reduction in loading in the core of the network, particularly on metro lines 6, 7 and 13 and on the RER A and RER B.

=== Stations ===
The 68 new stations are conceived as multimodal interchanges rather than simple metro stops, with passenger buildings, connections to existing metro, RER, tramway and bus services, and commercial space intended to anchor development in the surrounding districts. All platforms will be fitted with platform screen doors, as the trains run without drivers. The architect Jacques Ferrier was appointed to draw up a common architectural charter for the stations, which individual project architects must follow.

=== Associated infrastructure ===
Fibre-optic ducts are being laid along the tunnels to create a telecommunications network serving the areas along the route, expected to bring the SGP around €200 million in revenue, and about twenty data centres are planned in otherwise unused underground spaces, with studies under way on reusing their waste heat.

== Line 11 extension ==
A six-station 5.4-kilometre (3.4 mi) eastern extension of Line 11 from Mairie des Lilas to Rosny-sous-Bois, not itself part of the Grand Paris Express project, improves service to the inner northeastern suburbs. The scheme was lobbied for by the local authorities and adopted during the 2007 review of the Île-de-France transportation plan. Work on the extension to Rosny – Bois-Perrier started in 2015 and opened on 13 June 2024. It provides connections with the RER E and with Île-de-France tramway Line 1.

List of new stations and connections (with opening dates)
New stations	Towns served	Connection	Opening date
Serge Gainsbourg	Les Lilas		13 June 2024
Place Carnot	Romainville, Noisy-le-Sec	Tramways in Île-de-France Île-de-France tramway Line 1	13 June 2024
Montreuil Hôpital	Montreuil, Noisy-le-Sec	(potential)	13 June 2024
La Dhuys	Montreuil, Noisy-le-Sec, Rosny-sous-Bois		13 June 2024
Côteaux Beauclair	Noisy-le-Sec, Rosny-sous-Bois		13 June 2024
Rosny – Bois-Perrier	Rosny-sous-Bois	RER RER E	13 June 2024

A revised plan for the Grand Paris Express unveiled on 6 March 2013 calls for a second extension of Line 11 towards Noisy–Champs, which would form part of the project. Its target opening date was 2030, but the extension has been postponed indefinitely for lack of funding. Should it be built, Line 11 would eventually be fully automated; automatic operation was not implemented with the Rosny extension, although the RATP and Île-de-France Mobilités have considered adding it later.

=== Rolling stock ===
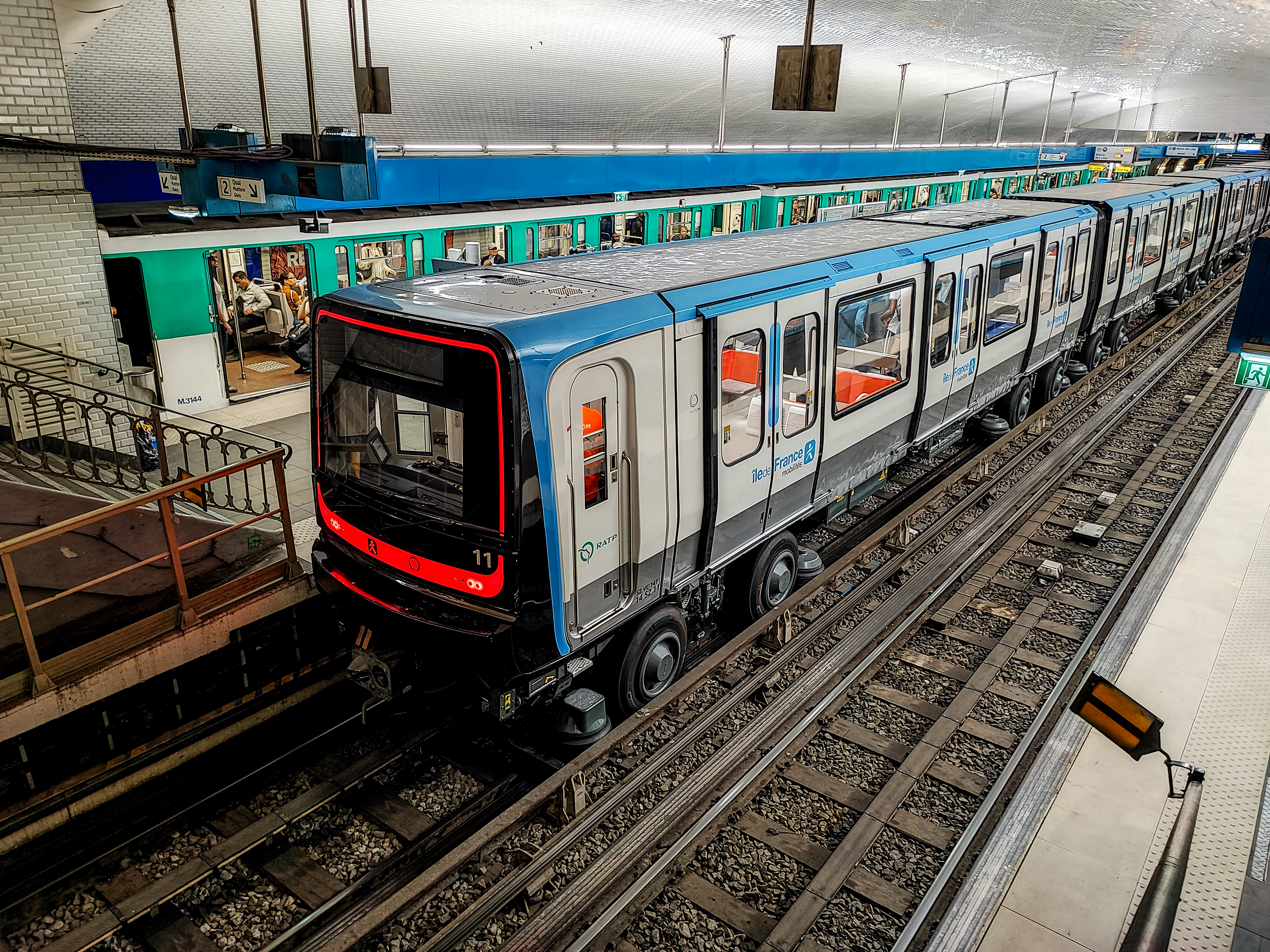
An MP 14 CC trainset, in service on Line 11 since June 2023

Île-de-France Mobilités replaced the line's ageing MP 59 fleet with MP 14 trains around the opening of the extension to Rosny-sous-Bois. The new trains are driver-operated like their predecessors, but run as five-car sets with open gangways. The first MP 14 sets entered service in June 2023, and the additional trains were deployed in spring 2024 to serve the extension; the last MP 59 sets were withdrawn in May 2024.

== Line 14 extension ==
=== Northern extension of Line 14 ===
The automated Line 14 was extended north from Saint-Lazare to Mairie de Saint-Ouen, with the primary aim of reducing overcrowding on Line 13. The adopted solution connects both branches of Line 13 to Line 14, with stations at Porte de Clichy on the Asnières – Gennevilliers branch and Mairie de Saint-Ouen on the Saint-Denis branch. An additional station connects with the Saint-Ouen RER C station, and another with the Transilien Paris-Saint-Lazare lines at Pont Cardinet. Construction began in 2014 and was originally due to finish in 2019. Completion was pushed back after flooding from the water table stopped tunnel works for a year, and the COVID-19 pandemic delayed the opening further, to December 2020. A further extension north to Saint-Denis–Pleyel, connecting with the RER D, opened on 24 June 2024, a month before the 2024 Summer Olympics.

=== Southern extension of Line 14 ===
Line 14 was also extended south from Olympiades to Orly Airport. The extension travels southeastward from Olympiades to Maison Blanche, interchanging with Line 7's Villejuif branch. It opened on 24 June 2024, together with the northern extension to Saint-Denis–Pleyel. The extended Line 14 forms the north–south spine of the Grand Paris Express network, connecting with the new lines at Saint-Denis–Pleyel, Villejuif–Gustave Roussy and Orly Airport.

=== Rolling stock ===
In February 2012 the STIF announced that, with the two extensions planned, the new MP 14 class of rolling stock would replace the MP 89 CA and MP 05 stock on Line 14 from 2020. The new stock runs in eight-car formations, longer than previously used anywhere on the Paris Metro but matching the length for which all Line 14 stations were built. The displaced MP 89 CA and MP 05 stock was reassigned to the newly automated Line 4.

== Line 15 ==
Line 15

Overview
- Termini: Noisy–Champs; Champigny Centre station
- Connecting lines: Paris Metro Paris Metro Line 1 Paris Metro Line 4 Paris Metro Line 5 Paris Metro Line 7 Paris Metro Line 8 Paris Metro Line 9 Paris Metro Line 11 Paris Metro Line 12 Paris Metro Line 13 Paris Metro Line 14 Paris Metro Line 16 Paris Metro Line 17 Paris Metro Line 18
- Stations: 36

Service
- System: Paris Metro
- Operator(s): ORA (RATP Dev, Alstom, ComfortDelGro)
- Rolling stock: Alstom Metropolis MR6V

History
- Opened: 2027–2031

Technical
- Line length: 75 km (47 mi)
- Track gauge: 1,435 mm (4 ft 8 1/2 in) standard gauge
- Conduction system: Automated
Route map

Line 15 will be a high-capacity underground ring line around Paris, serving the departments of Hauts-de-Seine, Val-de-Marne and Seine-Saint-Denis. It will enable direct journeys between the suburbs, bypassing central Paris. The configuration of the line closely follows the Métrophérique scheme proposed by the RATP in 2006 and the Arc Express project that grew out of it. It was later folded into the red line of the Grand Paris network introduced by President Nicolas Sarkozy in 2009, and received its current number in the "Nouveau Grand Paris" recast announced by Prime Minister Jean-Marc Ayrault in March 2013.

Line 15 is planned to open in phases between 2027 and 2031. It will form a loop connecting Noisy–Champs to Champigny, passing through Champigny-sur-Marne, Créteil, Villejuif, La Défense, Saint-Denis and Rosny-sous-Bois. The southern section, from Pont de Sèvres to Noisy–Champs, is the most advanced: its tunnels were completed in 2021 and, after repeated delays, it is expected to open in 2027.

=== Rolling stock ===
The rolling stock for Line 15 is a new high capacity automated design using conventional steel wheels on steel rails and overhead electrification, with a width of 2.80 metres (9 ft 2 in). Alstom is building the trains, designated Alstom Metropolis MR6V (a six-car variant; the three-car MR3V variant will serve lines 16 and 17). Alstom won the first rolling stock contract in 2018, and a further 23 three-car sets were ordered in March 2019 for lines 16 and 17.

The specifications of the trains and their operation are as follows:

- Train width: 2.80 metres (9 ft 2 in) minimum
- Train length: 108 metres (354 ft), made up of 6 cars with fully open interior gangways
- Train capacity: 960 passengers (at 4 passengers per m²)
- Bearings: steel
- Electric traction current: 1,500 volt direct current via pantograph and contact wires
- Operation: Fully automated
- Maximum speed: 120 kilometres per hour (75 mph)
- Average operating speed: 55 kilometres per hour (34 mph)
- Theoretical morning rush hour throughput: 34,560 passengers per hour
- Average interval: 3 to 4 minutes
- Minimum interval: 2 minutes

== Lines 16 and 17 ==
Line 16

Overview
- Termini: Noisy–Champs; Saint-Denis–Pleyel
- Connecting lines: Paris Metro Paris Metro Line 11 Paris Metro Line 14 Paris Metro Line 15 Paris Metro Line 17
- Stations: 10

Service
- System: Paris Metro
- Operator: Keolis
- Rolling stock: Alstom Metropolis MR3V

History
- Opened: 2027–2028

Technical
- Line length: 25 km (16 mi)
- Track gauge: 1,435 mm (4 ft 8 1/2 in) standard gauge
- Conduction system: Automated

Line 17

Overview
- Termini: Le Mesnil–Amelot; Saint-Denis–Pleyel
- Connecting lines: Paris Metro Paris Metro Line 14 Paris Metro Line 15 Paris Metro Line 16
- Stations: 9

Service
- System: Paris Metro
- Operator: Keolis
- Rolling stock: Alstom Metropolis MR3V

History
- Opened: 2027–2030

Technical
- Line length: 25 km (16 mi)
- Track gauge: 1,435 mm (4 ft 8 1/2 in) standard gauge
- Conduction system: Automated

Lines 16 and 17 will share a trunk section between Saint-Denis–Pleyel and Le Bourget. Line 16 will run east from there to Noisy–Champs, serving Seine-Saint-Denis; Line 17 will run north to Le Bourget Airport, Charles de Gaulle Airport and Le Mesnil-Amelot. Line 16 is planned to open between 2027 and 2028, and Line 17 in phases between 2027 and 2030.

The case for Line 17 has been contested. In 2019, Le Monde reported that many experts, including within the transport ministry, considered its traffic forecasts weak, with the line's fortunes tied to EuropaCity, the contested shopping and leisure complex then planned at Gonesse and abandoned later that year.

=== Rolling stock ===
Lines 16 and 17 will use the same automated design as Line 15, 2.80 metres (9 ft 2 in) wide with steel wheels and overhead electrification, but in the three-car Alstom Metropolis MR3V variant, sized for the lower forecast demand.

== Line 18 ==
Line 18

Overview
- Termini: Versailles Chantiers; Aéroport d'Orly
- Connecting lines: Paris Metro Paris Metro Line 14 Paris Metro Line 15
- Stations: 10

Service
- System: Paris Metro
- Operator: Keolis
- Rolling stock: MRV

History
- Opened: 2026–2030

Technical
- Line length: 50 km (31 mi)
- Track gauge: 1,435 mm (4 ft 8 1/2 in) standard gauge
- Conduction system: Automated

Line 18 will link Orly Airport with Versailles-Chantiers across the Saclay plateau, serving the research and university cluster of Paris-Saclay. It is planned to open in phases between 2026 and 2030, starting with the section from Massy–Palaiseau to the plateau. In May 2020, a consortium led by Vinci won a €799 million contract for the first civil engineering package, covering 11.8 kilometres (7.3 mi) of tunnel and three stations between Orly and Massy–Palaiseau.

=== Rolling stock ===
Line 18 will use the MRV (Matériel Roulant Voyageurs), a smaller automated design 2.45 metres (8 ft 0 in) wide, with steel wheels and third rail electrification. Alstom was chosen to build the trains in 2021.

== Proposed Line 19 ==
In November 2023, the Île-de-France region and the Val-d'Oise department launched studies for a Line 19, a proposed line from Nanterre–La Folie to the Triangle de Gonesse, where it would meet Line 17 towards Charles de Gaulle Airport. The line is meant to serve Val-d'Oise, largely left out of the Grand Paris Express, and could open around 2040. It is not legally part of the project, and integrating it would require a new law.

== Construction ==
Preparatory works began in 2015 and tunnelling followed from 2016. The works were among the largest in Europe, with dozens of tunnel boring machines in service at the peak of construction. The scale of the works strained the regional construction market: from 2019, contractors reported price inflation for cranes, site equipment and concrete.

Spoil from the tunnel boring machines is removed by road, and by rail in the Val-de-Marne. The SGP set a target of reusing 70 per cent of excavated material, but by late 2019 less than 40 per cent was being put to use.

The labour inspectorate recorded five deaths on the region's major construction sites between 2020 and April 2023, and opened 141 investigations into workplace accidents from late 2019.

== Cost and financing ==
The network proposed in 2009 was costed at around €20 billion, and the 2013 recast at about €27 billion. In January 2018 the Cour des comptes put the cost at €38.5 billion, criticised the optimism of the initial estimates and warned that borrowing without new revenue would push full repayment from 2059 to 2084. A French Senate report of 2020 estimated the total at €35.6 billion in 2012 prices, around €42 billion in then-current terms, of which €19.3 billion had been committed.

Construction is financed by the Société des Grands Projets, mainly through taxes levied in Île-de-France, including levies on office space, and long-term borrowing repaid over decades. The 2019 budget added a 15 per cent surcharge on the tourist tax in the region's municipalities and tightened the office tax to raise roughly €140 million a year more for the project.

Operating the completed lines will fall to Île-de-France Mobilités, which pays the chosen operators and owes the SGP a usage fee on the infrastructure. A financing protocol signed by the state and Île-de-France Mobilités in September 2023 set aside €474 million for running the new lines opening up to 2031.

== Operations ==
The lines will not run around the clock: overnight closures are kept for maintenance of the track, equipment and control systems, though Île-de-France Mobilités may extend service on particular evenings or nights. All services will call at every station; express runs were studied and rejected, since the high running speeds and frequencies made them unnecessary and skipping stops would have required costly passing tracks. The average commercial speed will be about 65 kilometres per hour (40 mph), roughly three times that of the existing metro, with headways as short as 85 seconds at peak times. Trains will run on the right, like the metro and unlike the RER and the French train network.

Under the 2010 Grand Paris law, the RATP is the infrastructure manager of the new lines through its subsidiary RATP Infrastructures, while the operators of each line are chosen by competitive tender. This split was contested by Keolis, which argued in 2016 that dividing an automated metro between an operator and a separate infrastructure manager was untested and could bias competition in the incumbent's favour. The first contracts were nonetheless awarded across the market: lines 16 and 17 to Keolis in May 2023, Line 15 to the ORA consortium of RATP Dev, Alstom and ComfortDelGro in July 2023, and Line 18 to Keolis in June 2024.

Maintenance will be handled from dedicated sites along the network: train maintenance and stabling depots, rapid-repair centres at line ends far from the main depots, and infrastructure maintenance sites for track and systems.

== Design and art ==
For each of the new stations, the SGP has commissioned a permanent artwork under its "Illustrer le Grand Paris" programme. Thirty artists from graphic design, illustration, animation and comics, among them François Schuiten, Edmond Baudoin and Enki Bilal, were chosen to work with the station architects. The network also has its own typeface, Grand Paris Express, designed for the passenger signage of the 68 stations.

== Reception ==
The Grand Paris Express received the Veronica Rudge Green Prize in Urban Design from Harvard University's Graduate School of Design in 2023.

The new stations have been credited with cutting journey times and widening access to jobs in the suburbs. The project has also drawn criticism over its effects on residents: in a 2024 book, Les Naufragés du Grand Paris Express, the researchers Anne Clerval and Laura Wojcik describe a "planned gentrification" around the new stations, pointing among other things to demolitions for worksites. Planners at the Atelier parisien d'urbanisme, the city's urban planning agency, counter that public housing programmes are rebalancing the station districts, citing a 50 per cent rise in social housing around Pont de Sèvres between 2010 and 2024.
