= Alstom Metropolis =

Family of rapid transit electric multiple units

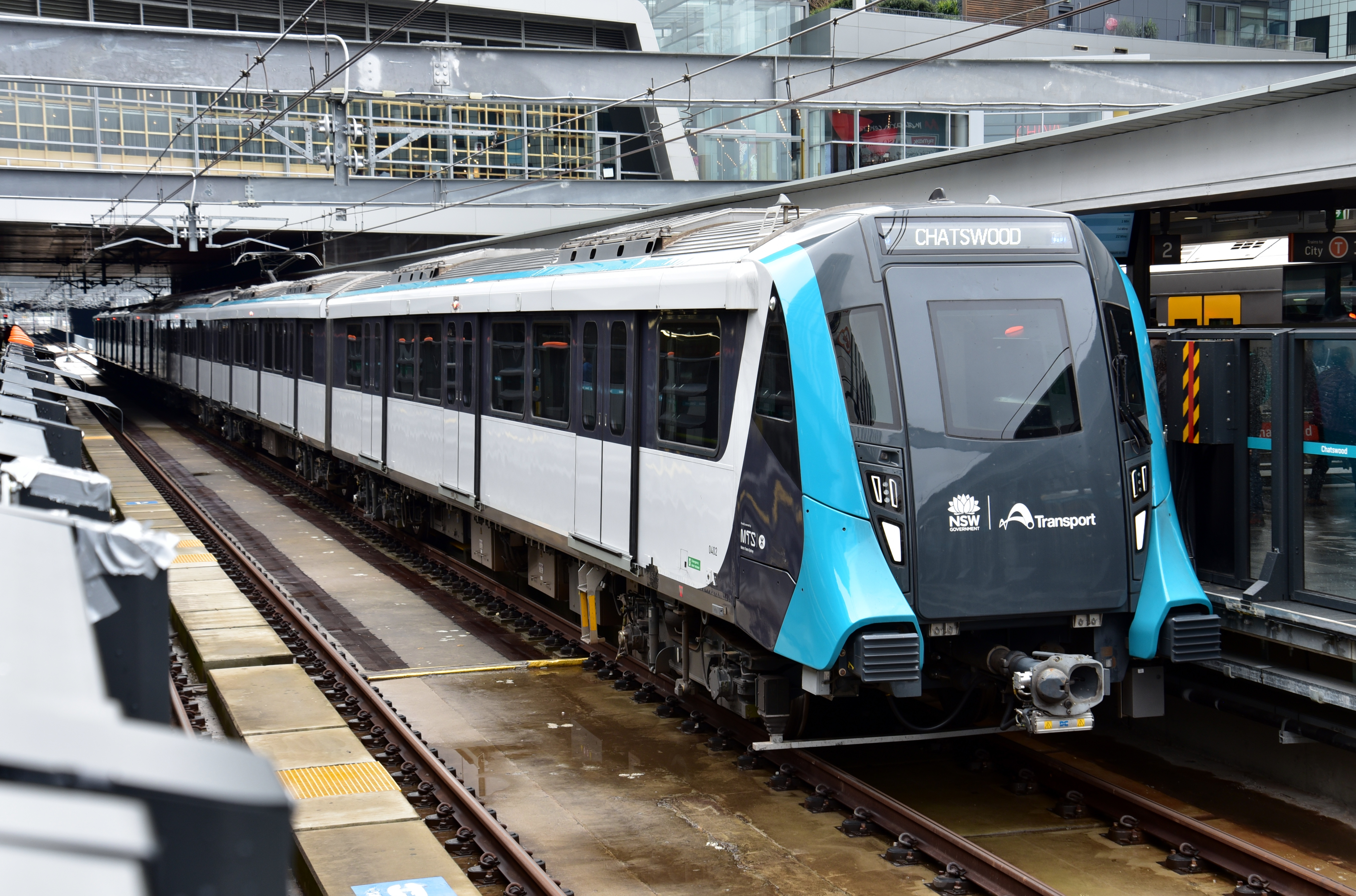
- A Metropolis stock train on Sydney Metro
- Stock type: Electric multiple unit
- Manufacturer: Alstom
- Constructed: 1993–present (rubber-tyred); 1998–present (conventional steel wheel)

Specifications
- Traction system: Alstom ONIX or OPTONIX IGBT–VVVF
- Electric systems: Overhead line, 1,200 V DC, 25 kV 50 Hz AC, 1,500 V DC; Third rail, 750, 1,500 V DC
- Current collection: Pantograph (overhead lines); Contact shoe (third rail)
- Track gauge: 1,432 mm (4 ft 8 3/8 in) (Bucharest); 1,435 mm (4 ft 8 1/2 in) (most trains); 1,600 mm (5 ft 3 in) (Brazil)

The Alstom Metropolis is a family of electric multiple units designed and produced by the French rolling stock manufacturer Alstom. It is designed for high capacity rapid transit or metro rail infrastructure systems. Trains can be run in various configurations, the length alone varying between two and ten cars; it is also suitable for both staffed or unstaffed operations.

More than 4,000 Metropolis cars have been manufactured, the type is reportedly in service with 50 operators distributed around the world. Cities operating the Metropolis include Singapore, Shanghai, Budapest, Warsaw, Nanjing, Montreal, Buenos Aires, São Paulo, Lima, Santiago, Barcelona, Guadalajara, Istanbul, Santo Domingo, Chennai, Dubai, Kochi, Lucknow, Sydney, Amsterdam, Hanoi, Paris, Riyadh, and Mumbai.

== Design features ==
Alstom's Metropolis family of electric multiple units is highly adaptable; the basic body can significantly vary in size between small, medium and wide configurations to meet a variety of client's needs. A typical trainset is deployed in a two- to six-car arrangement. The Metropolis has been designed to be both flexible and reliable, incorporating a high level of technology to do so. It has been designed for a maximum speed of up to 120 km/h (75 mph), which has been deemed to be sufficient for its use on mass transit systems. The propulsion system incorporates the ONIX (ONduleur à Intégration eXceptionnelle) or OPTONIX VVVF drive with IGBT transistors that control asynchronous three-phase alternating current (AC) traction motors. Amongst other abilities, this arrangement enables regenerative braking, reducing the train's energy consumption.

It can be configured to operate as part of an entirely automated driverless system, enabling the train to have unattended train operation (UTO) functionality. To achieve this, Alstom typically offers the Metropolis as one element of a complete turnkey system, including the trainset itself along with the signalling system, track works and services. Several operators have procured the train in such a configuration, including the Sydney Metro (Australia's first fully-automated rail network) and the Budapest Metro (the first automated metro line in Central-Eastern Europe).

The car body is highly adjustable, being composed either of aluminium or stainless steel, while the width can range from 2.30–3.2 m (7 ft 6 1/2 in – 10 ft 6 in) and the length from 13–25 m (42 ft 7 3/4 in – 82 ft 1/4 in). It can be fitted with either steel wheels or rubber tyres, depending upon the customer's requirement. As standard, each Metropolis features a trainborne Ethernet backbone, providing resilient broadband communications for subsystems, including security apparatus, an optional public address system, and passenger information equipment; these are organised into integrated modules within the onboard security and communications subsystems. For ease of maintenance, the Metropolis is compatible with an internet-delivered TrainTracer tool, which monitors major components of each train and can display condition information in real-time to depots and operational control centres alike.

The interior can also be customised as per customer requirements. Optional features include closed-circuit television (CCTV), wider seats, additional grabpoles, more space around the doors, wheelchair space and equipped with electronic displays – the latter is typically used to depict journey information, safety messages and advertisements. The size of the doors can be customised along with the width of the gangways, while a modular seating arrangement is typically installed. A specialised glass named Climavit is used for the windows, it is supplied by the French manufacturer Sekurit Saint-Gobain; amongst its claimed benefits is a reduction in the typical internal noise level by five decibels.

== Major deployments ==
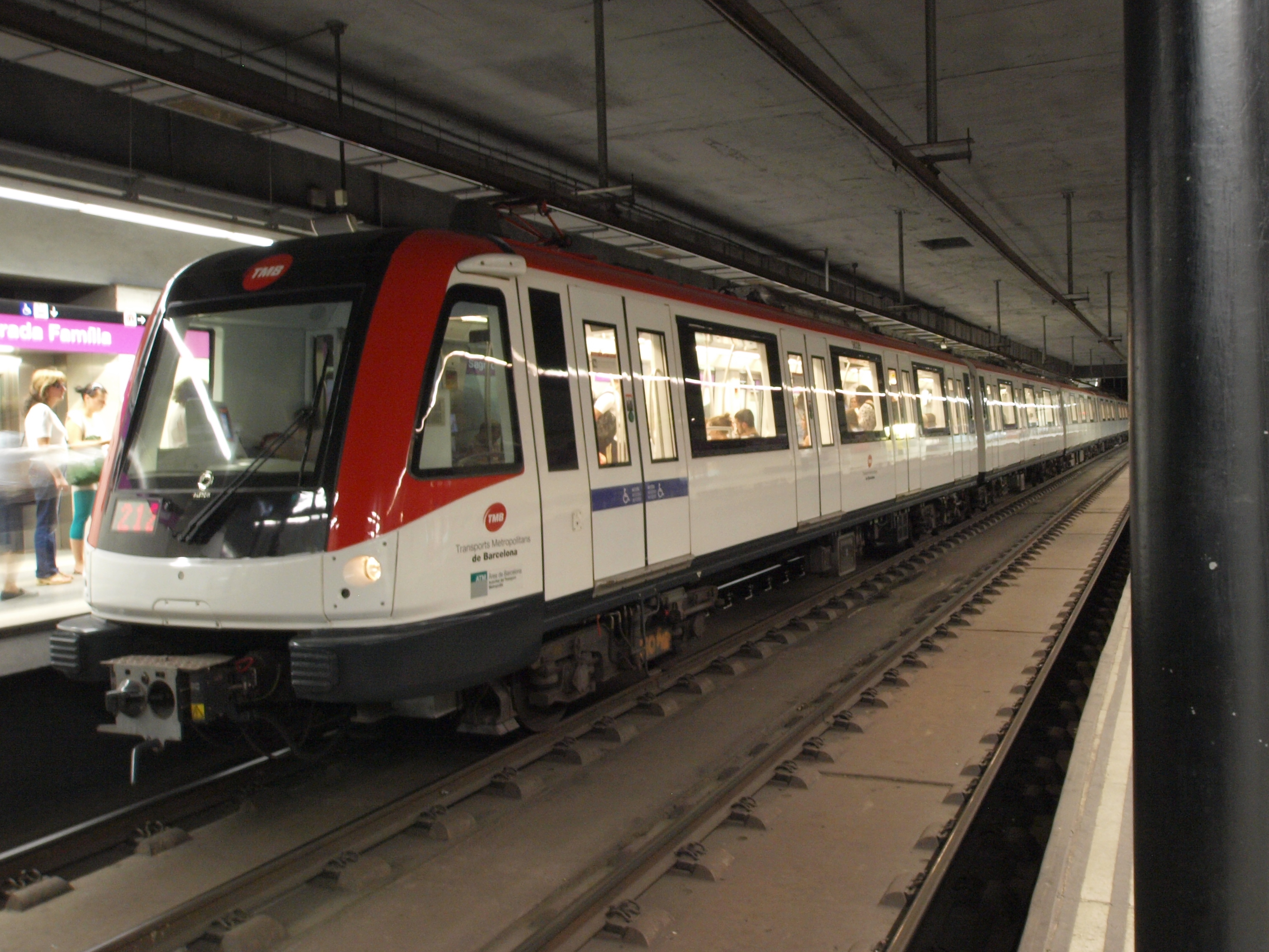
An Alstom Metropolis 9000 of Barcelona Metro

During July 2006, OPRET signed an initial contract for the supply of 19 Metropolis trainsets to equip the first line of the Santo Domingo Metro with Alstom; these were configured to be nearly identical to the 9000 series on the Barcelona Metro save for the livery applied. In January 2011, an order was announced for a further 15 Alstom trainsets for Line 2. During March 2012, the first trainsets for the second line were delivered to the operator.

Alstom secured a $253m (€200m) order in February 2010 from GVB for 23 six-car Type M5 Metropolis trainsets for the Amsterdam Metro. Three years later, this was followed by a supplemental order, valued at €42m ($53m), for five more trains. Each being configured to carry up to 1,000 passengers, they have replaced all of the legacy M1-M3 sets on the East Line as well as increased overall capacity, being used on all routes except Route 51.

During March 2012, Singapore's Land Transport Authority placed an order valued at $303m for the supply of 34 Metropolis trains, 18 of which were for the North East Line (NEL) while the remaining 16 were allocated to Circle Line (CCL). Furthermore, accompanying signalling upgrades for both of these lines was also included in the arrangement.

A total of 15 Metropolis trainsets were ordered for Hungary's Budapest Metro. During March 2014, operations of the type on the Metro's underground line four commenced, thus becoming the first automated metro line in Central-Eastern Europe.

In 2010, Alstom secured a large order, valued at approximately $307m (€243m), to supply 42 train sets for Phase I of the Chennai Metro. The first nine trains were imported from Brazil and the remaining were manufactured at a new facility established at Sri City, Tada about 75 kilometres (47 mi) from Chennai. The trains are air-conditioned with electrically operated automatic sliding doors and a regenerative braking system. The cars operate on 25 KV AC through an overhead catenary system with a maximum speed of 80 kilometres per hour (50 mph). During July 2014, Alstom delivered the first pair of Metropolis trainsets, which were the first trains to be manufactured at Alstom's new Indian production site.

During September 2014, Alstom was awarded a substantial contract to equip the Sydney Metro Northwest, Australia's first fully-automated rail network. The deal involved the production and supply of 22 six-car Metropolis train sets, along with the communications-based train control (CBTC) signalling infrastructure to facilitate its automated operations.

In November 2020, Alstom secured a contract to provide 20 driverless Metropolis trainsets for the Athens Metro Line 4, due to open in 2028. During this time, Alstom also secured an order of 13 six-car Metropolis BM4 trains for use on Bucharest Metro line M5, for 100 million euros, which can be expanded up to 240 million euros for an extra 17 trains. These will also be equipped with Alstom's URBALIS 400 CBTC system on board for STO operation.

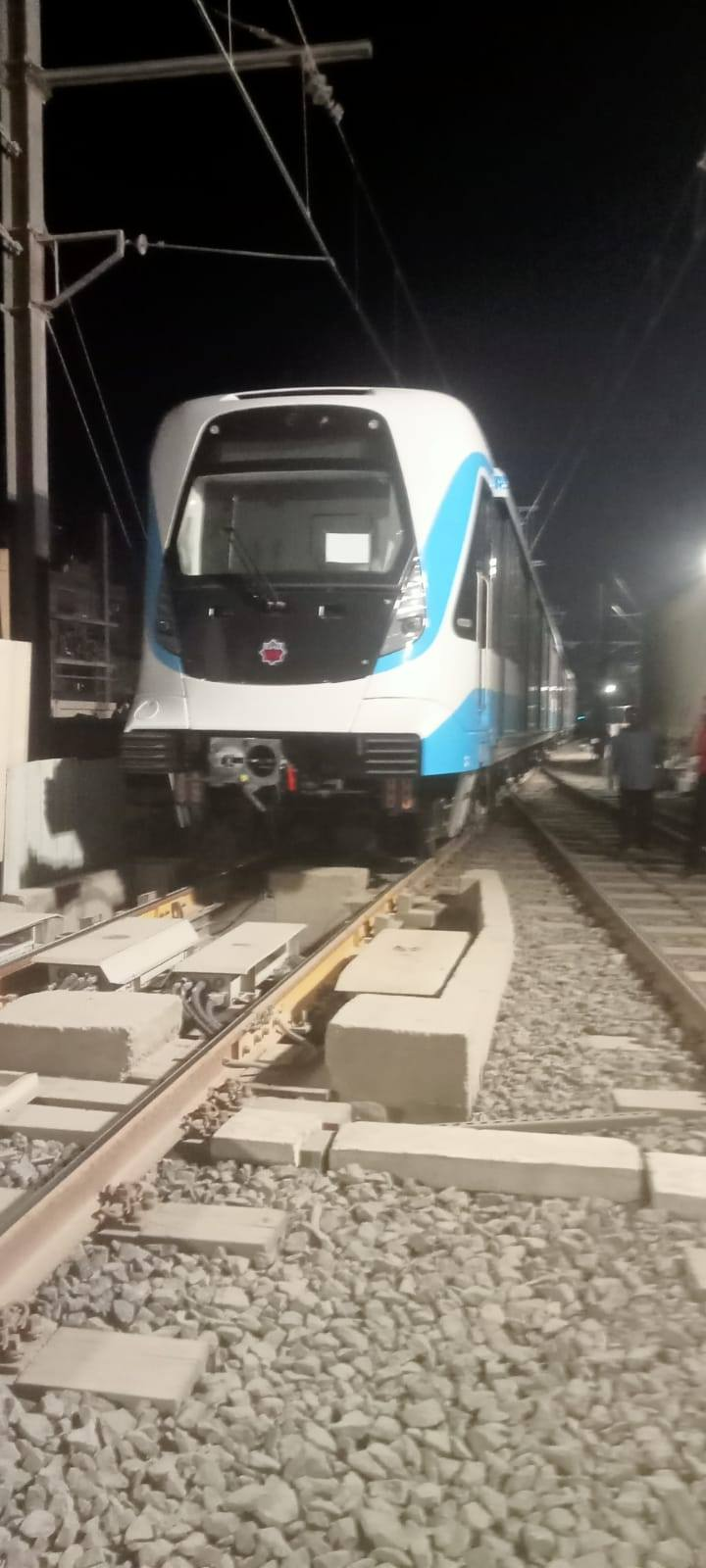
The first Metropolis train operating on Line 1 of the Greater Cairo Metro (taken during the trial run, May 2025)

In November 2021, the Egyptian National Authority for Tunnels signed a contract with Alstom to supply 55 air-conditioned Metropolis trains for Cairo Metro Line 1. Each train will consist of nine cars, with delivery scheduled to begin in 2025. The contract, valued at approximately €876 million, also includes long-term maintenance and technical support services, as well as localizing manufacturing at Alstom's new industrial complex in Borg El Arab, Alexandria. The first two trainsets entered service on 15 November 2026.

== Rolling stock variants ==
- For Singapore
  - Alstom Metropolis C751A
  - Alstom Metropolis C830
  - Alstom Metropolis C830C
  - Alstom Metropolis C751C
  - Alstom Metropolis C851E (North East and Circle Lines)
- For Warsaw
  - Alstom Metropolis 98B
- For Barcelona
  - Barcelona Metro 7000 Series
  - Barcelona Metro 8000 Series
  - Barcelona Metro 9000 Series
- For Buenos Aires
  - Buenos Aires Underground 100 Series
  - Buenos Aires Underground 300 Series
- For Bucharest
  - Alstom Metropolis BM4
- For Paris
  - MP 89
  - MF 01 (MF 2000)
  - MP 05
  - MP 14
  - MR3V/MR6V
  - MRV
  - MF 19
- For Santiago
  - NS 93
  - AS 2002
  - NS 2004
- For Budapest
  - AM5-M2
  - AM4-M4
- For Istanbul
  - AM4 (Overhead) for M3
- For Amsterdam
  - M5 series
- For Sydney
  - Metropolis Stock
- For Montreal
  - Alstom Metropolis Saint-Laurent
- For Caracas
  - Alstom Metropolis S90000

== Gallery ==
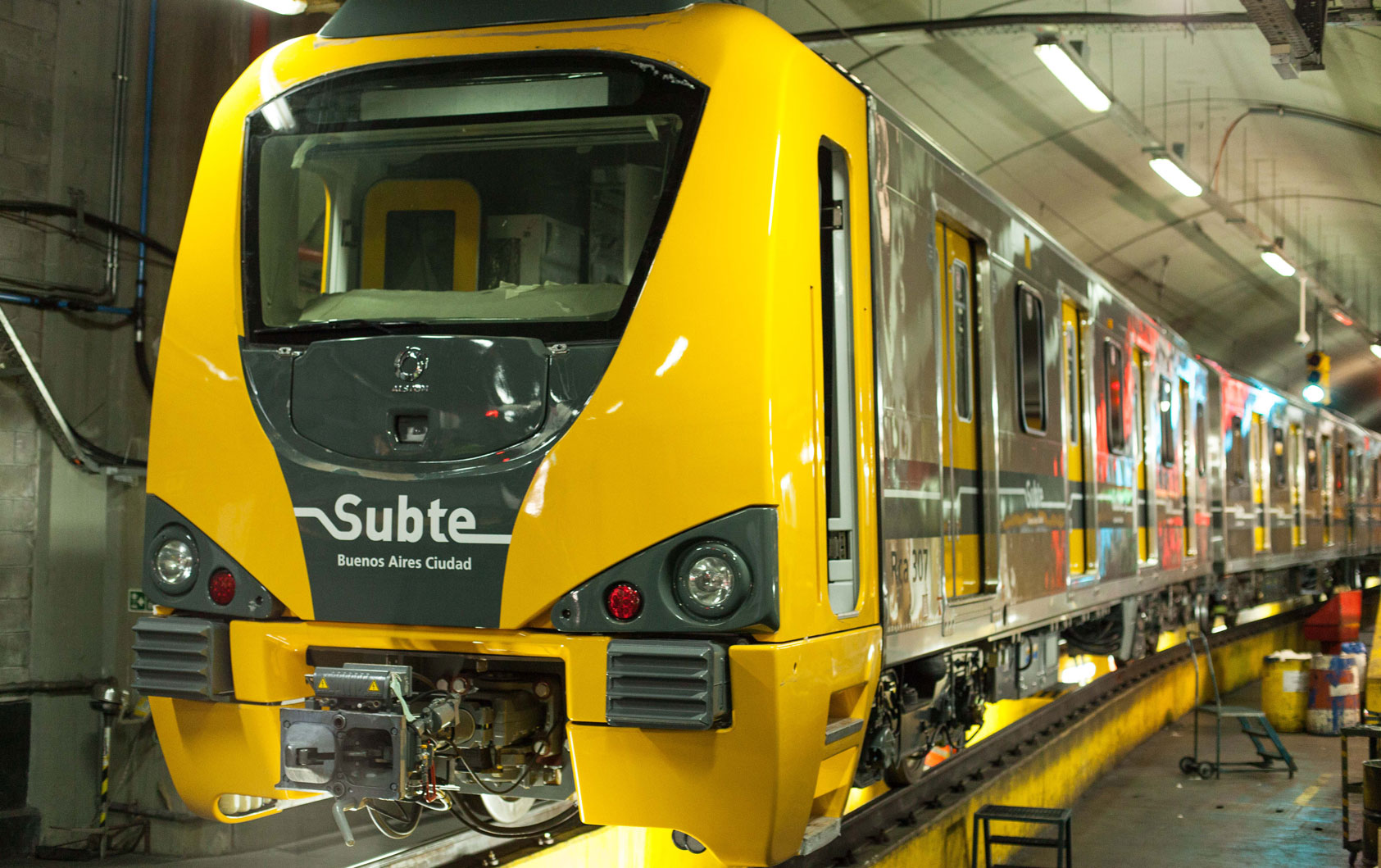
Buenos Aires Underground 300 Series

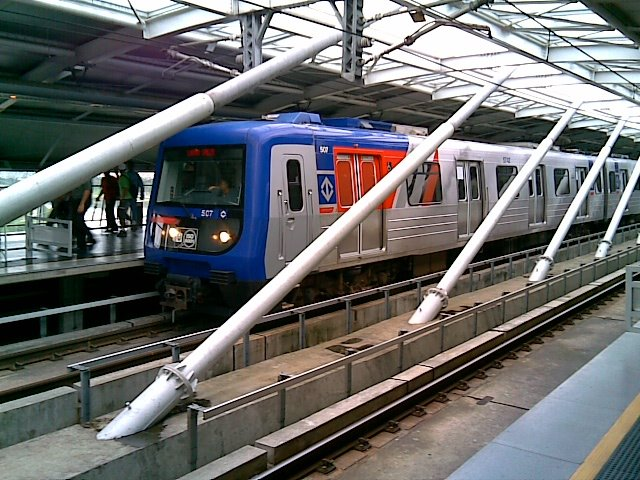
Metropolis on São Paulo Metro

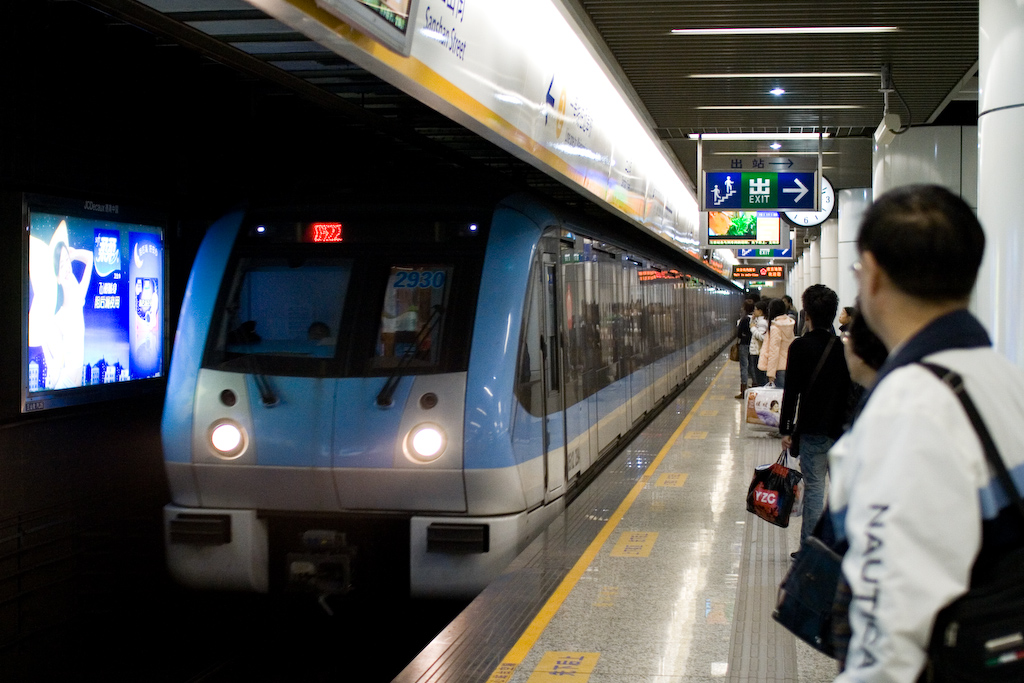
Metropolis in Nanjing, China

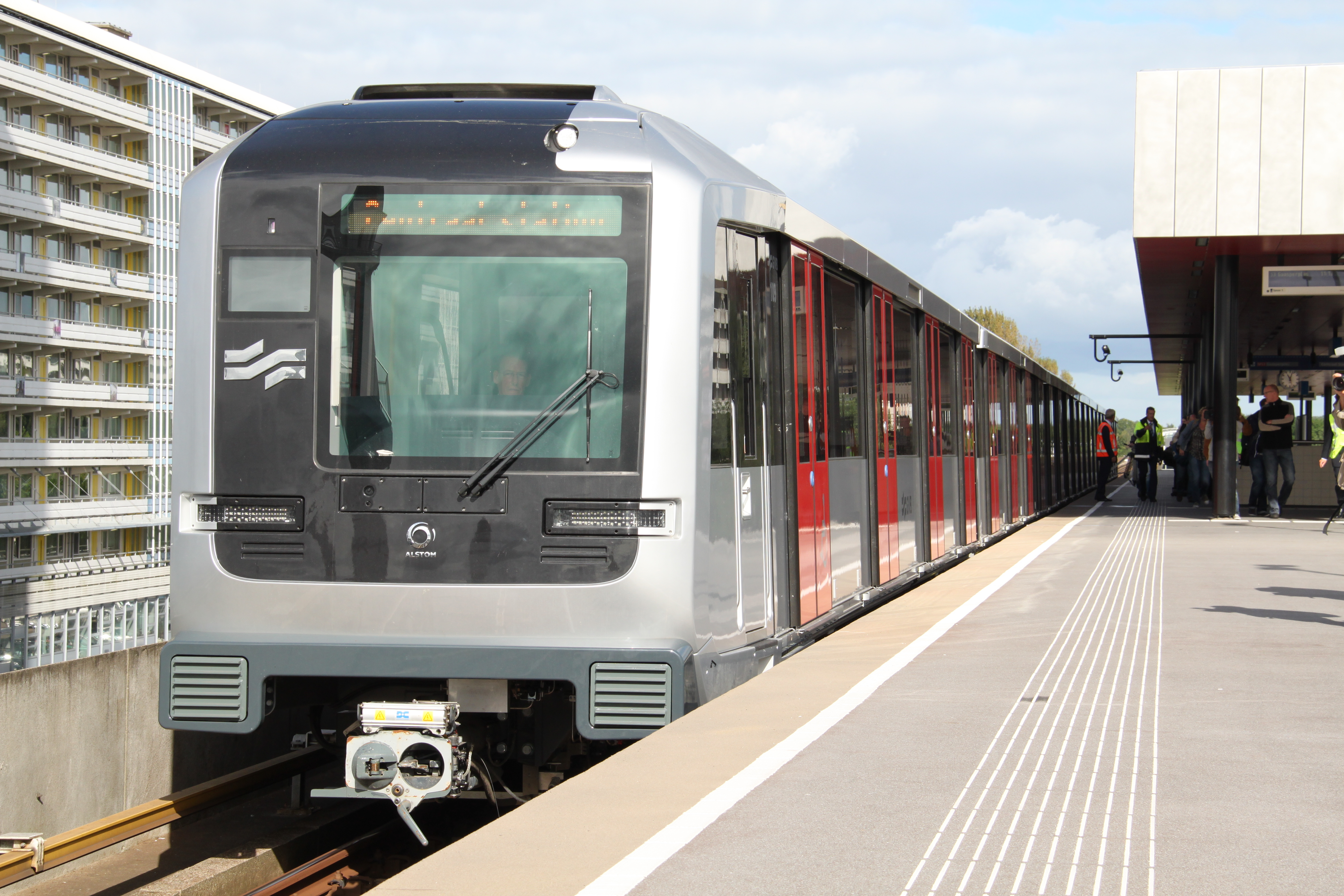
Amsterdam M5 Series

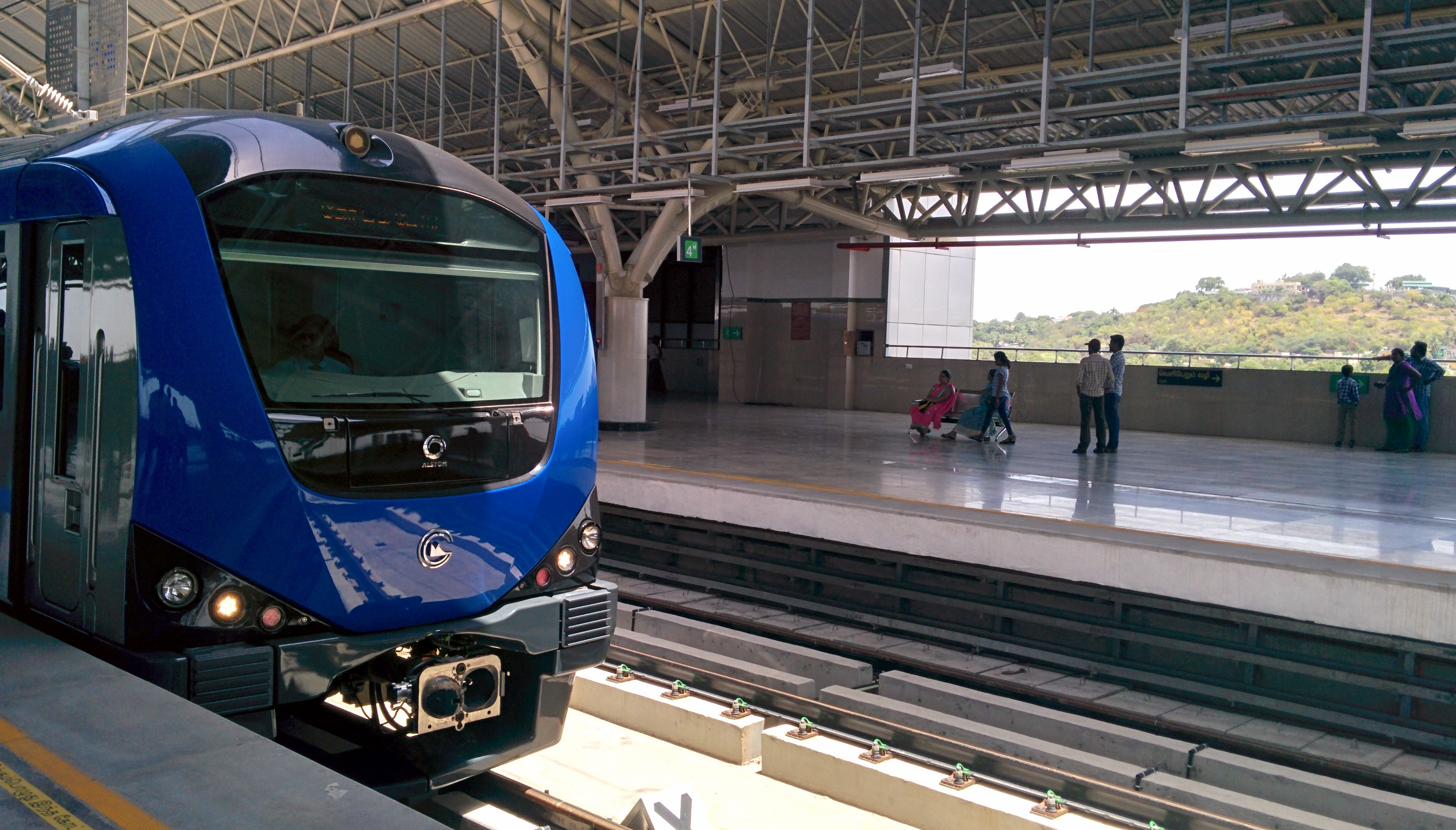
Metropolis on Chennai Metro

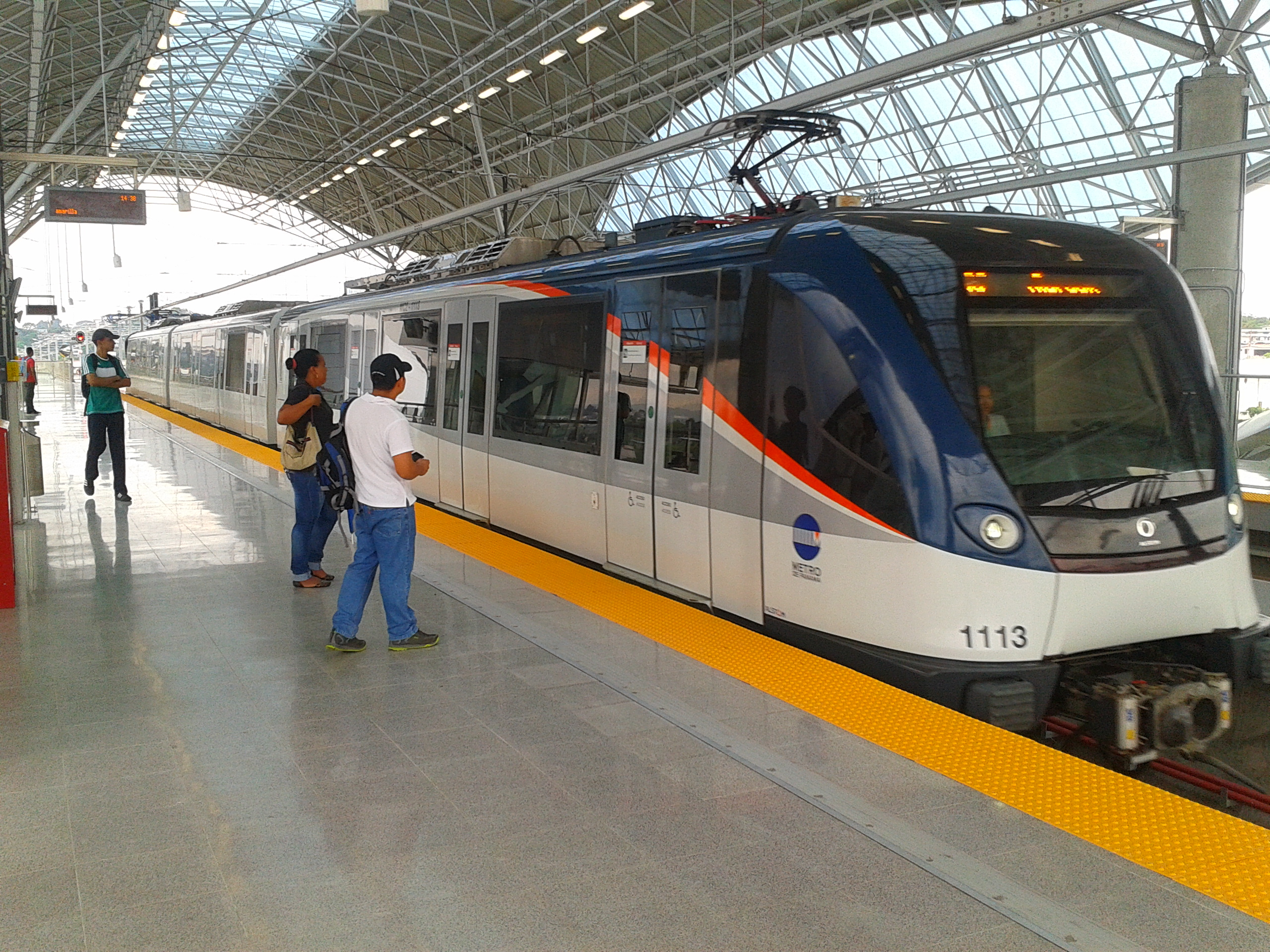
Metropolis on Panama Metro

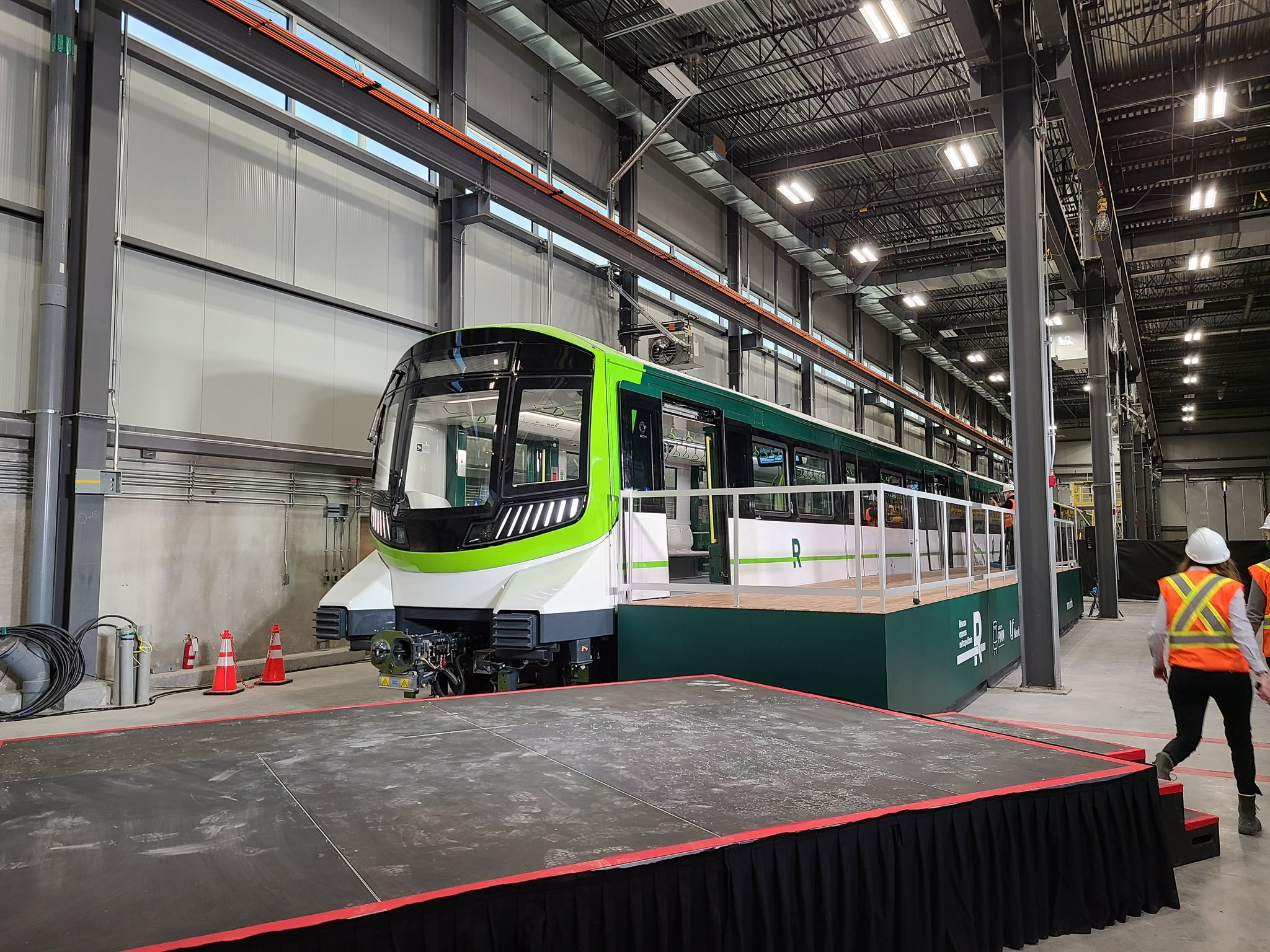
Montreal REM

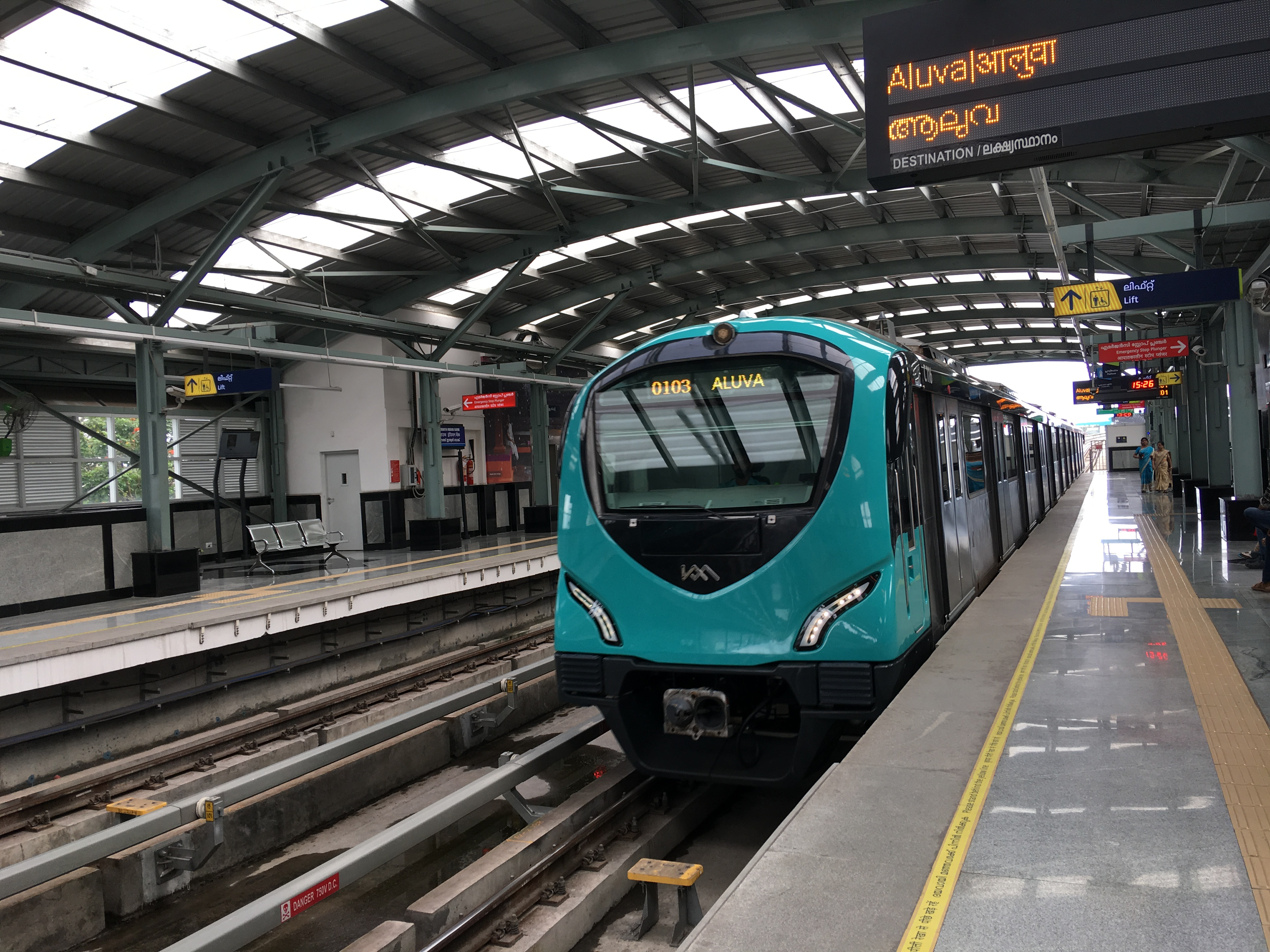
Kochi Metro

Metropolis on Mumbai Metro

== Systems which use Metropolis cars ==
- Abidjan Metro (starting from 2028)
- Amsterdam Metro
- Athens Metro (starting from 2030)
- Baghdad Metro (starting from 2027)
- Barcelona Metro
- Bucharest Metro (starting from Q4 2023, built in Taubaté)
- Budapest Metro
- Buenos Aires Underground
- Cairo Metro Line 1
- Caracas Metro
- Chennai Metro
- Dubai Metro
- Delhi Metro (starting 2026, received first trainset)
- Federal District Metro (Brazil)
- Guadalajara SITEUR Line 3
- Line 3 (Hanoi Metro)
- M6 (Istanbul Metro)
- M2 (Istanbul Metro)
- Kochi Metro
- Lille Metro (starting from 2026)
- Lima Metro
- Los Teques Metro
- Lucknow Metro
- Melbourne Suburban Rail Loop (starting from 2035)
- Montreal REM
- Mumbai Metro Aqua Line
- Nanjing Metro
- Panama Metro
- Paris Metro
- Pune Metro Pink Line
- Riyadh Metro
- Santiago Metro
- Santo Domingo Metro
- São Paulo Metro
- São Paulo Metropolitan Trains
- Shanghai Metro
- Singapore MRT
- Sydney Metro
- Taipei Metro
- Toronto Subway (Line 2) (Start date in the future.)
- Warsaw Metro

== Production ==
- France: Valenciennes
- Poland: Alstom Konstal in Chorzów
- Serbia: Belgrade
- Spain: Santa Perpetua de Mogoda
- Brazil: Lapa
- China: CRRC Nanjing Puzhen in Nanjing and Shanghai Alstom (joint venture between Alstom and Shanghai Electric) in Shanghai
- India: Sri City, Andhra Pradesh
- Egypt: Borg El Arab, Alexandria (production starts in 2026)
- Canada: Kingston and Thunder Bay (future sites).
- Australia: Dandenong, Melbourne (commencement TBD).

== See also ==
- Alstom Movia
- Siemens Inspiro
