= Paris Metro Line 16 =

Planned métro line in Île-de-France

Line 16
- Paris Metro Line 16
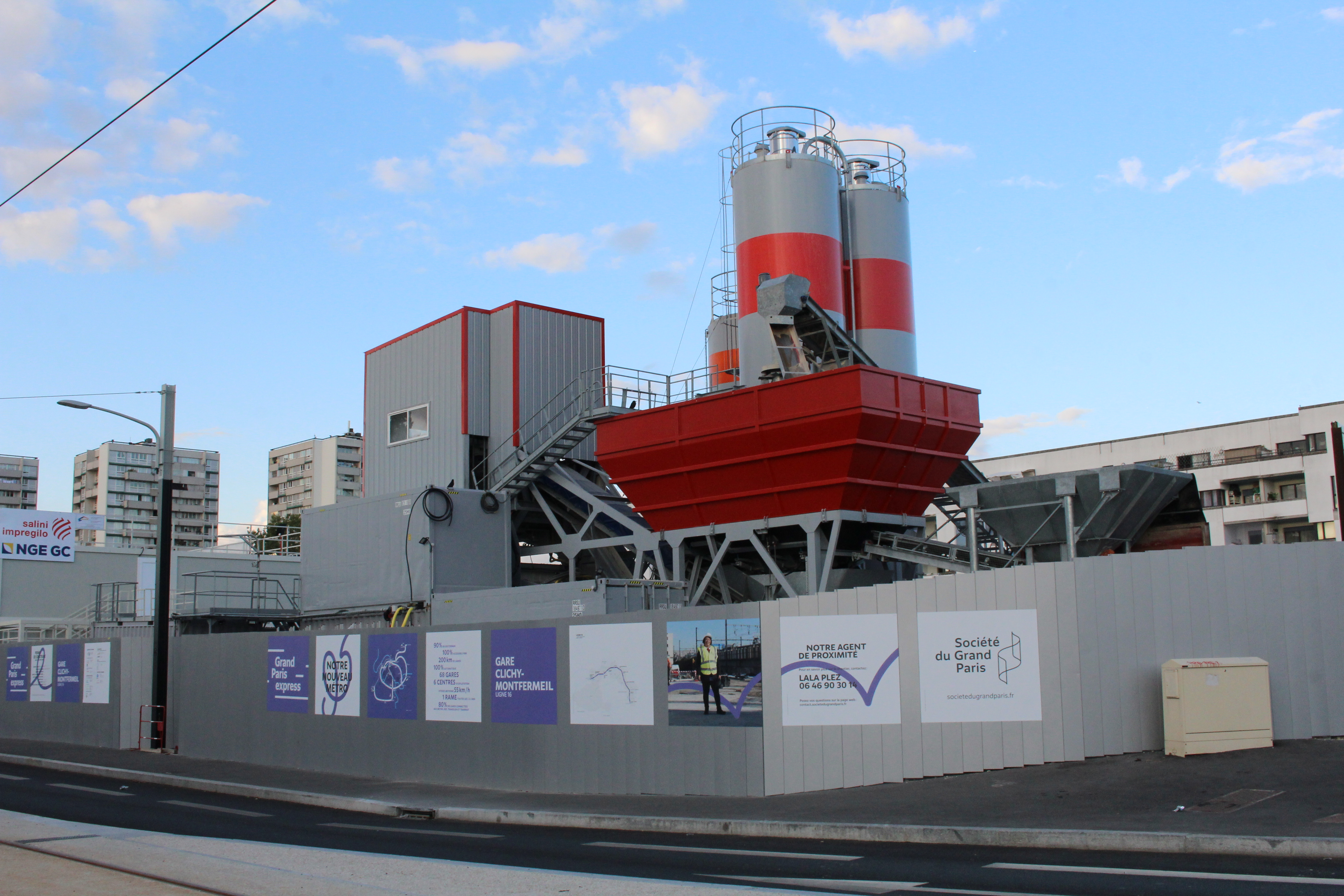
- Construction in Clichy–Montfermeil

Overview
- Termini: Noisy–Champs; Saint-Denis–Pleyel
- Connecting lines: Paris Metro Paris Metro Line 11 Paris Metro Line 14 Paris Metro Line 15 Paris Metro Line 17 RER RER A RER B RER E Transilien Transilien Line P (Paris-Est) Tramways in Île-de-France Île-de-France tramway Line 1 Île-de-France tramway Line 4 Île-de-France tramway Line 11
- Stations: 10

Service
- System: Paris Metro
- Operator: Keolis
- Rolling stock: Alstom Metropolis MR3V

History
- Planned opening: Autumn 2028 (Saint-Denis–Pleyel to Parc du Blanc–Mesnil); Autumn 2029 (full line)

Technical
- Line length: 27.5 km (17.1 mi)
- Track gauge: 1,435 mm (4 ft 8 1/2 in) standard gauge
- Electrification: Overhead line, 1,500 V DC
Route map

Paris Metro Line 16 is one of four new lines of Grand Paris Express, a major expansion project of the Paris Metro. Currently under construction, the line will connect the suburbs north and east of Paris in the Seine-Saint-Denis department, and is planned to open in two phases in autumn 2028 and autumn 2029. Line 16 will be fully automated (along with all Grand Paris Express lines) and fully underground.

The line is being built by Société du Grand Paris, a public agency set up by the French Government to deliver the Grand Paris Express project. The trains will be operated by Keolis, while the infrastructure is managed by RATP.

== History ==
Line 16 was first proposed as the eastern segment of the Grand Paris Express red line, a project launched by Nicolas Sarkozy in 2009 consisting of new automated Metro lines in the suburbs of Paris. In March 2013, the "New Grand Paris" project was announced by the Prime Minister at the time, Jean-Marc Ayrault. At this time, the line acquired its current line 16 naming.

The line between Saint-Denis–Pleyel and Noisy–Champs is 27.5km in length, with 10 stations and a maintenance depot shared with Line 17. This section of the line is estimated to cost around €2.85bn. 3 stations will be shared with Line 17, including the western terminus at Saint-Denis–Pleyel. 8 of the 10 stations will connect to other lines on the Paris transport network, including 4 metro lines, 4 RER lines and 2 Tramway lines.

The construction of the line was originally planned to start in 2017, and the line be completed by 2023. In February 2018, this was revised to complete the line by 2024, in time for the 2024 Olympic and Paralympic Games. A further delay to the project was announced in 2021, with the opening of the line split into 2 phases to open in autumn 2026 and in 2028. In February 2025, a further delay was announced, with the first phase now due to open in mid-2027, due to delays in the construction of line 15 which shares its automated driving system with lines 16 and 17. On 24 September 2026, it was announced that the opening of the first phase was postponed to autumn 2028 and it will only include the section between Saint-Denis Pleyel and Parc du Blanc-Mesnil, with the rest of the line postponed to autumn 2029.

=== Construction ===
The declaration of public utility was in December 2015, and preparatory construction work on the line began in February 2016. Major civil engineering began in February 2018. In February 2021, the last major construction contract was awarded, and all stations are now under construction, with 5 tunnel boring machines digging tunnels along the line.

The Saint-Denis–Pleyel station was opened on 24 June 2024 by French President Emmanuel Macron in time to serve the main stadium for the 2024 Summer Olympics and Summer Paralympics. The section of line between Saint-Denis–Pleyel and Parc du Blanc-Mesnil will open in autumn 2028, with an extension south to Noisy–Champs to open in autumn 2029, completing the line.

== Rolling stock ==
In July 2018, Alstom was selected to supply the rolling stock for the Grand Paris Express project at a cost of €1.3bn for 183 trains. In March 2019, an order of 23 3-car trains was confirmed, albeit that the trains will be shared between lines 16 and 17. Shorter 3-car trains were ordered to reduce construction and operational costs, and that the lines are forecast to have a lower level of ridership than Line 15.

The specifications of the trains travelling line 16 and their operation are as follows :

- Train width : 2.80 metres (9 ft 2 in) minimum
- Train length : 54 metres (177 ft), made up of 3 cars with full-open interior gangways
- Train capacity : around 500 passengers
- Rails : iron
- Electric traction current : 1500 volt direct current via pantograph and contact wires
- Operation : Fully automated
- Maximum speed : 120 kilometres per hour (75 mph)
- Operating speed: 55 kilometres per hour (34 mph)
- Average interval : 3 to 4 minutes
- Minimum interval : 2 minutes
