= Arc Express =

Project to build new transit lines in France

Arc Express was a project to build new rapid transit lines in île-de-France, France. It was designed to satisfy the need for increased travel among the suburbs of Paris and to relieve the saturation of a number of radial lines, such as Métro Line 13 and RER Line A. Previous proposals for an orbital metro line, dating back to the early 1980s, never came to fruition.

Official studies of the Arc Express were launched by the president of Île-de-France region in December 2007. The project was superseded by the Grand Paris Express project.

== Projected Schedule ==
The projected schedule included the following steps over approximately ten years:

- December 2007: concept validation;
- 2008 - 2009: preliminary studies;
- Spring 2009: consultation with local officials;
- July 2009: Referral to the National Commission on Public Debate (CNDP);
- September 30, 2010 to January 31, 2011: public debate;
- Early 2011: Decision on the implementation of the project;
- Spring 2011: route plan;
- 2011: Public inquiry;
- 2012: Draft;
- 2012-2019: Construction;
- 2019: Public opening of the southern arc.

== Launch ==
In November 2006, the Île-de-France region submitted a draft master plan of the Île-de-France (SDRIF) that took into account the interests of the politicians and the population for an orbital metro ring through the inner suburbs.

From 2006 to 2008, initial studies on the project identified a zone of territory in which the Arc Express could be built. The proposed SDRIF, adopted by the Regional Council on September 25, 2008, proposed to study the construction of four arcs:

- a link between southeastern Val de Fontenay and Noisy-le-Grand and Arcueil or Bourg-la-Reine, for commissioning in 2020 (phase 2 of SDRIF);
- a north-west link between Defense and Saint-Denis, for commissioning in 2020 (phase 2 of SDRIF);
- a link between northeastern Val de Fontenay and Noisy-le-Grand and Saint-Denis, opening in the 2025-2030 timeframe (phase 3 SDRIF);
- a link between southwestern Arcueil or Bourg-la-Reine and Défense through St. Cloud and Suresnes or Rueil-Malmaison, opening in the 2025-2030 timeframe (phase 3 SDRIF).

Rainbow Express was included in the proposed 2007-2013 CPER, finalized on March 23, 2007 by the regional chair and the regional prefect.

On 5 December 2007, the project was officially launched by Jean-Paul Huchon, the president of the Île-de-France region and Pierre Mutz, the prefect of the region, through the launching of studies funded by the state and region for €4 million. These studies focused particularly focused on the two priority arcs:

- the arc south between Issy-les-Moulineaux and Noisy-le-Grand or Val de Fontenay;
- the arc between North and Pantin and Bobigny Defense.

However, Christian Blanc, Secretary of State for the Capital Region, has expressed his opposition, casting doubt on the financing to be provided by the state. On April 29, 2009, French President Nicolas Sarkozy proposed a metro network including 130 km of automated lines. An attempt to reconcile these two proposals is underway.

On 8 July 2009, the STIF council unanimously approved the "record of objectives and main features" of the Project Arc Express. This vote starts the phase of public debate and consultation, through a referral to the National Commission on Public Debate (CNDP). The traffic studies conducted by STIF predict daily traffic for the whole Arc Express of about one million passengers. The costs of the line, including rolling stock necessary for commissioning and interconnection with existing stations is estimated to be between:

- €2.8 billion and €3.1 billion (2008 costs) for the southern arc (26 to 29 km);
- €2.0 billion and €2.3 billion (2008 costs) for the northern arc (18 to 21 km).

In September 2009, the CNDP reviewed the STIF referral of 9 July 2009 to determine whether or not to organise a public debate. The CNDP will organize a "special public debate commission" in charge of the consultation. Following public consultation, the plots will be known and the project can be declared of public interest before a possible start of construction. Given the time required for each procedure, the first sections of the Arc Express could open in 2017.

== Route ==
The precise route of the project was not determined but was to depend on the results of studies as well as the public debate.

The September 2008 draft presents the general location of the route and provides the terminals for each of the four arcs. However, for a better return on infrastructure and to increase the modal shift from private cars to public transport, arcs originally envisaged (limited by the RER A and B) could be extended. Thus, for example, the arc southeast could be extended westward to Issy-les-Moulineaux and the north-west arc east to Le Bourget. In addition, the current support of a large part of the political class, the "Grenelle laws", and the deterioration of transport on certain routes metro or RER, led financiers of the project to consider completing the orbital in one phase (2020) rather than prioritizing two arcs before the other two.

In March 2010, the STIF published a document to keep the public informed of the project. This paper highlights plots that may be more or less accurate depending on the area concerned. The two gray areas are between La Defense and Issy-les-Moulineaux on the one hand, and between Pantin / Bobigny and Fontenay-sous-Bois / Noisy-le-Grand on the other hand. The operating mode of the orbital is not yet fixed, and it is not known whether it will be a full ring operated in its continuity or several overlapping arcs operated independently. In either case, the public debate took place from September 30, 2010 to January 31, 2011, work is to begin in 2013, and commissioning of the first arc is projected in 2019 and the second arc in 2025.
