= Paris Metro Line 18 =

Metro line in France

Line 18
- Paris Metro Line 18

Overview
- Locale: Paray-Vieille-Poste; Antony; Massy; Palaiseau; Orsay; Saclay; Guyancourt; Versailles
- Termini: Aéroport d'Orly; Versailles Chantiers
- Connecting lines: Paris Metro Paris Metro Line 14 RER RER B RER C Transilien Transilien Line N (Paris-Montparnasse) Transilien Line U Transilien Line V Tramways in Île-de-France Île-de-France tramway Line 7 Île-de-France tramway Line 12
- Stations: 10 (under construction)

Service
- System: Paris Metro
- Operator: Keolis
- Rolling stock: MRV

History
- Planned opening: 2026 (from Massy-Palaiseau to Christ de Saclay); 2027 (from Orly Airport to Massy-Palaiseau); 2030 (from Christ de Saclay to Versailles-Chantiers) after 2030 (from Versailles-Chantiers to Nanterre–La Folie)

Technical
- Line length: 50 km (31 mi)
- Track gauge: 1,435 mm (4 ft 8 1/2 in) standard gauge
- Electrification: 1,500 V DC
- Conduction system: Automated

Paris Metro Line 18 is one of four new lines of Grand Paris Express, a major expansion project of the Paris Metro. Currently under construction, it will link Orly Airport to Versailles via Massy-Palaiseau, the Saclay Plateau, and Saint-Quentin-en-Yvelines. The line will be 35 kilometers (22 mi) long and will be fully automated (along with all Grand Paris Express lines). Subsequently, it is planned to be extended by about 15 kilometers (9.3 mi) from Versailles to Nanterre via Rueil-Malmaison.

It is expected to be completed after 2030. Its first section, from Orly Airport to the Saclay plateau (Christ de Saclay), is scheduled to open in 2026 between the stations of Massy-Palaiseau and Christ de Saclay, in 2027 between Massy-Palaiseau and Orly Airport, and in 2030 between Christ de Saclay and Versailles Chantiers. One of the line's aims is to serve the technological and scientific development cluster of Paris-Saclay and the campus of Paris-Saclay University.

Project management for engineering and stations has been entrusted to the Icare group, led by Ingérop Consulting and Engineering, with several architectural firms for the various stations of the section while the systems are under the responsibility by Egis Rail. The viaduct and the overhead stations are entrusted to the Benthem Crouwel group.

It will be the only metro line of the Grand Paris Express that will serve the department of Yvelines with three stations in two municipalities: the station of Versailles-Chantiers and that of Satory will be located at Versailles and the Saint-Quentin Est station will be located at Guyancourt.

== History ==
Line 18 is the result of the Grand Paris public transport network project, presented by the President of the Republic Nicolas Sarkozy in 2009. This provided for a large gauge green line connecting Orly Airport to Roissy via Saclay and La Défense. The green line is then included in the Grand Paris Express project with a terminus this time fixed at Nanterre, with entry into service then envisaged between 2025 and 2030.

On 6 March 2013, the Prime Minister Jean-Marc Ayrault unveils the map of the future network of the Nouveau Grand Paris (new name of the Grand Paris Express), on which appears for the first time the denomination of "line 18". Its route is then limited to the section Aéroport d'Orly – Versailles-Chantiers, the future of the section to Nanterre becoming uncertain. A variant of the route making it possible to serve the Versailles Saint-Quentin-en-Yvelines University was being considered, but was subsequently abandoned in favor of a more direct route. It is also on this occasion that the choice of a metro with an appropriate gauge is indicated, in view of the expected ridership which does not justify trains as large as on the other lines.

In 2014, Prime Minister Manuel Valls announced that the sections CEA Saint-Aubin – Massy–Palaiseau and Massy–Palaiseau – Aéroport d'Orly would be effective from 2024, the line having to be ready in time to serve the site envisaged for the Universal Exhibition of 2025.

The reinforced consultation on the line 18 project (section Orly Airport – Versailles-Chantiers ) took place from 12 May to 12 June 2015. The public investigation file was sent to the regional prefect by the SGP in the summer of 2015, for an investigation from 21 March to 26 April 2016.

Line 18 is declared of public utility on 28 March 2017.

In January 2018, Prime Minister Édouard Philippe announced the withdrawal of the French candidacy for the organization of the Universal Exhibition of 2025. It was then envisaged that a first section from Massy-Palaiseau to CEA Saint-Aubin be put into service from 2026.

On 15 May 2020, the Société du Grand Paris awarded Vinci Construction the first civil engineering contract for the line 18, for an amount of 800 million euros: it concerns the section from Orly to the Saclay plateau.

From 15 June to 17 July 2020, an additional public inquiry is carried out, to obtain an amending declaration of public utility, allowing the declaration to be made compatible with the town planning documents of Orsay, Palaiseau and Wissous.

=== Calendar ===
Line 18 is planned to be put into service in the following stages:

- in 2027, for the section from Massy-Palaiseau to Christ de Saclay,
- at the end of 2027, for the section from Aéroport d'Orly to Massy-Palaiseau,
- by 2030, for the section from Christ de Saclay to Versailles Chantiers.

For an opening after 2030, an extension from Versailles Chantiers to Nanterre–La Folie is under study.

== Specifications ==
The State-Region memorandum of understanding having ratified the fact that the line 18, originally called the green line, would be an automatic metro line with suitable gauge. the type of rolling stock that will circulate there will be an automatic metro, running on iron. The cars will have a width of approximately 2.50 meters (8 ft 2 in) (a size similar to that of the current Paris metro) and the trains will be composed of three or four cars which can accommodate 350 travelers by train. The trains will be supplied by a third rail in 1500 V, unlike lines 15, 16 and 17.

== Construction ==
=== Preparatory work ===
Preparatory works (relocation of networks) started in January 2018 at the future station Massy Opéra .

=== Construction work ===
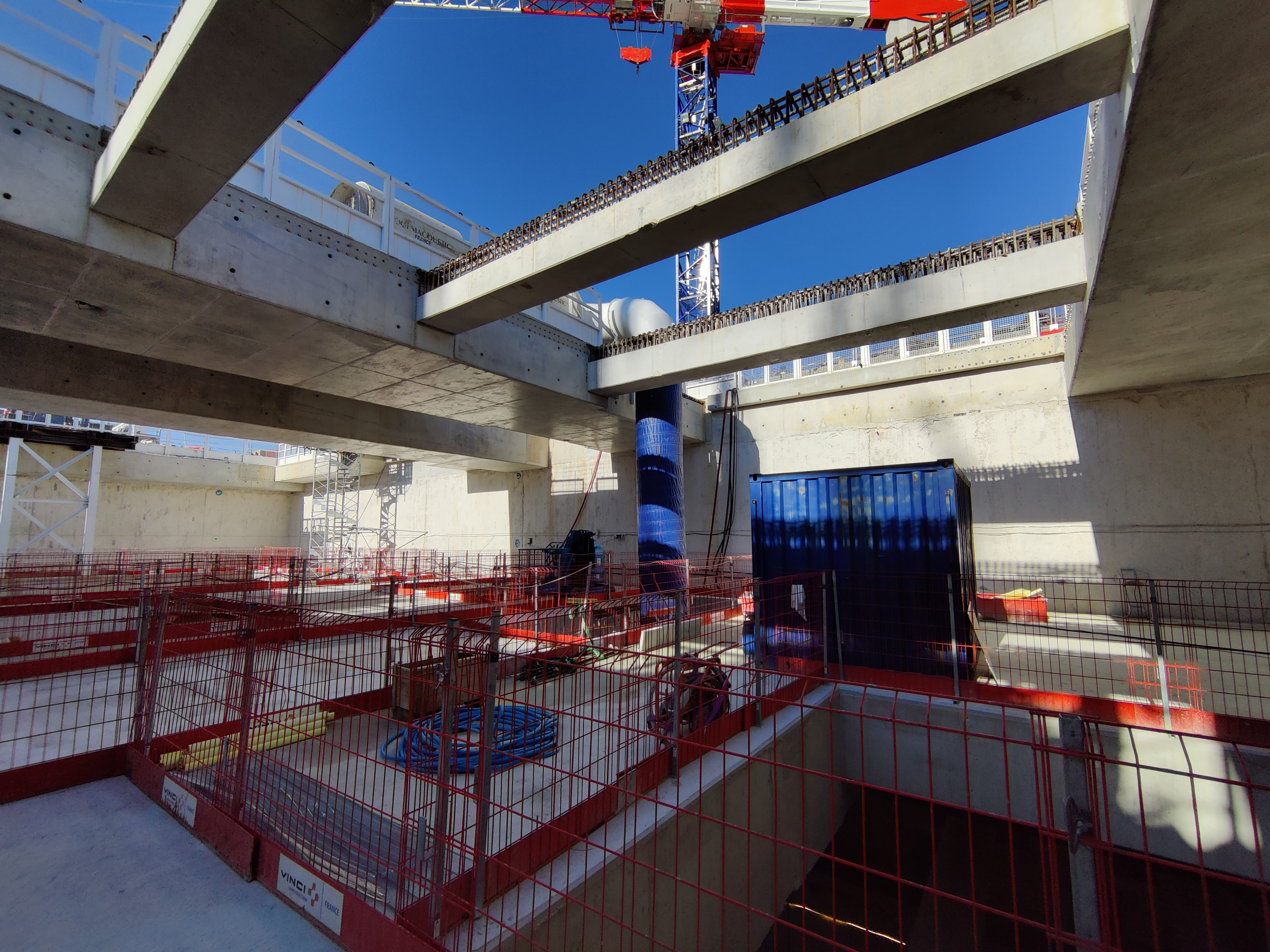
Construction of station Antonypole in Antony (October 2021).

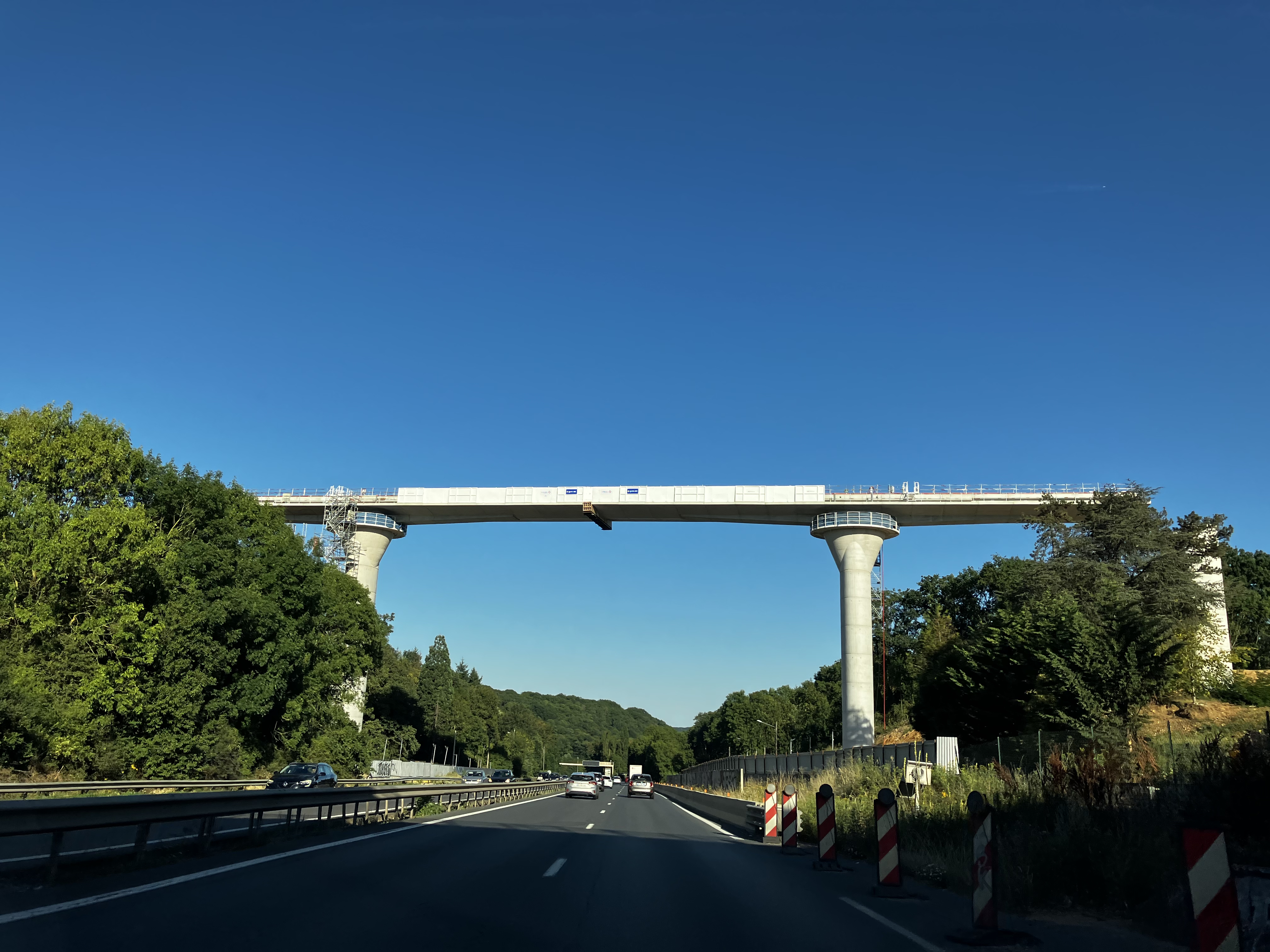
Construction of a viaduct, crossing N118 near Orsay (July 2022).

The market for the construction of the tunnel, stations and service works between the future station Aéroport d'Orly and the Saclay plateau, beyond the Massy station. Palaiseau was awarded in May 2020 to a consortium made up of Vinci Construction Grands Projets, Spie Batignolles Civil Engineering, Dodin Campenon-Bernard, Vinci Construction France, Spie Batignolles Foundations and Boots Foundations. The amount of the contract is EUR 799 million excluding taxes. This contract includes the construction of 11.8 kilometers (7.3 mi) of tunnel which will be dug by two tunnel boring machines, the construction of the Antonypôle, Massy Opéra and Massy-Palaiseau stations, as well as the crossing of the future Aéroport d'Orly, already under construction, and 13 works of service east of the line.

==== Line 18 tunnel boring machines ====
Two tunnel boring machines will be used to dig the 11.8 kilometres (7.3 mi) tunnel of the eastern section of Line 18 between Aéroport d'Orly and the Saclay plateau.

| Number | Last name | Entry point | Dated | Exit point | Dated | Distance (km) | Photo | Notes |
|---|---|---|---|---|---|---|---|---|
| 1 | | Croix de Villebois | | Massy D920 | | | | |
| 2 | | Massy D920 | | | | | | |

== Tracks and stations ==
=== Plot ===
Future route map of the line.

With a length of 35 km (22 mi), line 18 has an underground section of approximately 22 km (14 mi) (61% of the line) and an overhead section of 13 km (8.1 mi) (39% of line).

The line starts underground at Orly Airport to the south-east at the limit of the departments of Essonne and Val-de-Marne, under the car parks between the west and south terminals. The station is in correspondence with the Line 14 (which is parallel to it) and is extended by a rear station.

The route heads north and passes under the airport runways before turning west. It crosses the municipality of Wissous without stopping, passes under the A6 and A10 highways and then turns slightly south before turning to serve the station "Antonypôle" located in the town of Antony, Hauts-de-Seine. Entering the territory of the municipality of Massy, the line then serves "Massy Opéra" then passes under the LGV Atlantique before coming into line with the beam train from Massy–Palaiseau. It then serves the station of the same name where it connects with the RER B, RER C and the TGV station.

The line slants again towards the west and enters the town of Palaiseau before passing under the D36 then coming to stand parallel to the latter at the level of the district "Camille-Claudel." At this point the line becomes aerial and is inserted into a viaduct. It goes beyond the connection to the future Palaiseau maintenance workshop, bypasses the École polytechnique then serves after a curve and a counter-curve the air station of "Palaiseau". The viaduct then heads south, crosses N118 and serves the Orsay-Gif station located at the limit of Orsay, Gif-sur-Yvette and Saint-Aubin. The route then heads due north then north-west along N118 and serves the CEA Saint-Aubin station in Saclay.

The line then turns towards the west and crosses a long inter-station still in the air along the D36. It crosses the municipalities of Villiers-le-Bâcle and Châteaufort, marking the entry of the line into Yvelines. It then arrives at the National Golf of Magny-les-Hameaux and finds its course underground.

The tunnel heads north-east and serves the underground station of "Saint-Quentin Est" at Guyancourt. It crosses Guyancourt then oblique towards the east and arrives at the station "Satory" located at Versailles. Finally, the line passes under N12 and heads north-east before running alongside the railway tracks and arriving at the terminus of Versailles Chantiers where it connects to RER C and Transiliens N and U.

=== Phase 1 ===

| Station | Image | Commune | Opened | Interchanges | Distance (in km) | |
|---|---|---|---|---|---|---|
| Massy–Palaiseau | | Massy | 2027 | RER RER B RER C Tramways in Île-de-France Île-de-France tramway Line 12 Transilien Transilien Line V | – | 0.0 |
| Polytechnique; Campus de Palaiseau | | Palaiseau | 2027 | | 4.6 | 4.6 |
| Orsay–Gif-sur-Yvette; Université Paris-Saclay | | Orsay, Gif-sur-Yvette | 2027 | | 2.2 | 6.8 |
| Christ de Saclay; Commissariat à l'Énergie Atomique | | Saclay | 2027 | | 2.4 | 9.2 |

=== Complete Line ===
Line map.

=== Operations center ===
An operations center playing the role of maintenance and storage site for trains is planned at Palaiseau, along the departmental route 36, near the École polytechnique campus. Earthworks, carried out by Eiffage, begin in 3rd quarter 2020.

== Reception ==
Many local criticisms have been voiced regarding this project. Thus, residents and elected officials of the municipalities crossed by the aerial metro ask that it be buried. In addition, the inhabitants of Wissous, a town located between Antony and Orly Airport, crossed by the line but not served by it, in fact feel forgotten by the project.

The most important criticisms come from expert opinions outside the field of local democracy, pointing out in particular a gap difficult to justify between the dimensioning of this infrastructure and the flows that it would accommodate in view of the tools of territorial analysis and flow simulation. . Indeed, the justification of the line 18 project within the overall public transport network project of Greater Paris presented in 2009–2010 was that of the connection of employment centers among them, which would imply a significant flow between them. However, " connections between job centers in Île-de-France only represent 3% of transport needs ". In addition, the analysis of the socio-economic characteristics of the territories crossed shows that we have in the Orly pole " a high proportion of workers "on the spot", that is to say holding a job. in their commune of residence ", and that in the centers of Massy and Versailles," "trips are much more made internally than to an external basin" ".

Thus, from 2015, the General Investment Commission (CGI) issued an unfavorable opinion for line 18, in its Saclay-Versailles section.

The FNAUT Île-de-France transport users association considers line 18 as "a prestigious metro disconnected from real needs travel." AUT / FNAUT Île-de-France therefore wishes that an opinion be rendered unfavorable to the public utility of this line. In 2017, it renews its criticisms on the oversizing of the line 18 and considers that a tram-type service could be sufficient for the latter.

According to Pascal Auzannet, former senior official in charge of reflections on the Grand Paris metro project within RATP in the 2010s, it would be wiser to extend the 7.3 kilometers from the Orlyval to the Saclay plateau. Indeed, with a transport capacity at peak hour greater than 7500 passengers, this possibility is compatible with the traffic forecasts presented in 2016 during a public inquiry. In an interview with the Public Establishment in charge of the development of the urban project of the Saclay plateau, subsequent to the publication of the book, he generalizes this comment by indicating: “ The choice of a metro (rather than simple buses on specific sites) was therefore fully justified, but was there a need for a heavy metro, as on the other lines, with the risk of overcapacity? Personally, I have always thought that the initial option was oversized. (...) at the beginning, we envisaged capacities of 40,000 passengers in each direction of traffic, while demand by 2030 should not exceed 5–6,000”.

On 22 June 2018, during a conference of "Professional Groups of Arts and Crafts", Jean-Marc Jancovici, speaking of the carbon impact of the various infrastructures, said: “Line 18 […] will never refund its initial carbon, so if we want to do it [this project] on the grounds of carbon, we must not do it".

In July 2018, the Council of State rejected the requests of several communities and associations for the defense of the environment and validated the declaration of public utility.

In July 2020 during the last public inquiry into the project, FNAUT Île-de-France Transport Users Association pointed out in a message posted on the microblogging network Twitter that the socio-economic profitability of this line has been revised upwards in an unexplained manner.

== Development projects ==
=== The creation of a Camille-Claudel station ===
Since 2015, elected officials and residents in Palaiseau have mobilized for the construction of a new metro station next to the new eco-district of Camille-Claudel which is to house 4,000 inhabitants. This station would be located between the Massy-Palaiseau and Palaiseau stops, at the point where the line emerges from the ground to run on a viaduct.

The report of the Public Inquiry Commission of 2016 recommended that a land reserve be set up for the possible realization of this project after the opening of the line.

The amending DUP investigated from 15 June to 17 July 2020 took this recommendation into account by modifying the profile of the line in the Palaiseau sector. A 100 metres (330 ft) long landing is thus planned between the emergence of the tunnel and the viaduct to allow for the construction of a future station.

=== Extension to the north ===
The line is envisaged to be extended from Versailles to Nanterre beyond 2030. As of 2019 this extension is not funded.

=== Towards an extension to the east ===
During the meeting of the steering committee of the Orly Airport station, on 3 May 2016, the Grand Paris company announced that in order not to mortgage the future, protective measures will be taken at the station Aéroport d'Orly to create a possible extension to the east of the line beyond 2030. This measure is taken after requests from local elected officials of Val-de-Marne and Essonne to connect Villeneuve-Saint-Georges, located on RER D, to the Orly Airport area to facilitate its access. Other elected officials want the extension to go to Boissy-Saint-Léger, located on RER A, to the same reasons. Finally, the department of Val-de-Marne via the Orbival association will mobilize elected officials to reflect on this extension.

The public inquiry commission recommends during its publication of 13 July 2016 that the Aéroport d'Orly station be built in such a way as to make possible an extension to RER D.

== Tourism ==
Line 18 will serve several notable points of Île-de-France:

- the Orly Airport;
- the Saclay plateau and its universities (Paris-Saclay University and Polytechnic University of Paris);
- the new town of Saint-Quentin-en-Yvelines in the town of Guyancourt;
- the city of Versailles.

== Rolling Stock ==
The proposed rolling stock for line 18 is the MRV (Matériel Roulant Voyageurs), a new automated design with a width of 2.45 metres (8 ft 0 in), using conventional steel wheel on steel rail technology and third rail electrification. Alstom has been chosen to build these trains.

== See also ==
=== Related Articles ===
- Paris Metro
- Grand Paris Express

=== External links ===
- Line 18, presentation of the project on the site of the Société du Grand Paris
- Public survey of line 18
