= MRV (Paris Metro) =

Future Paris Metro train

4000 Séries (MRV)
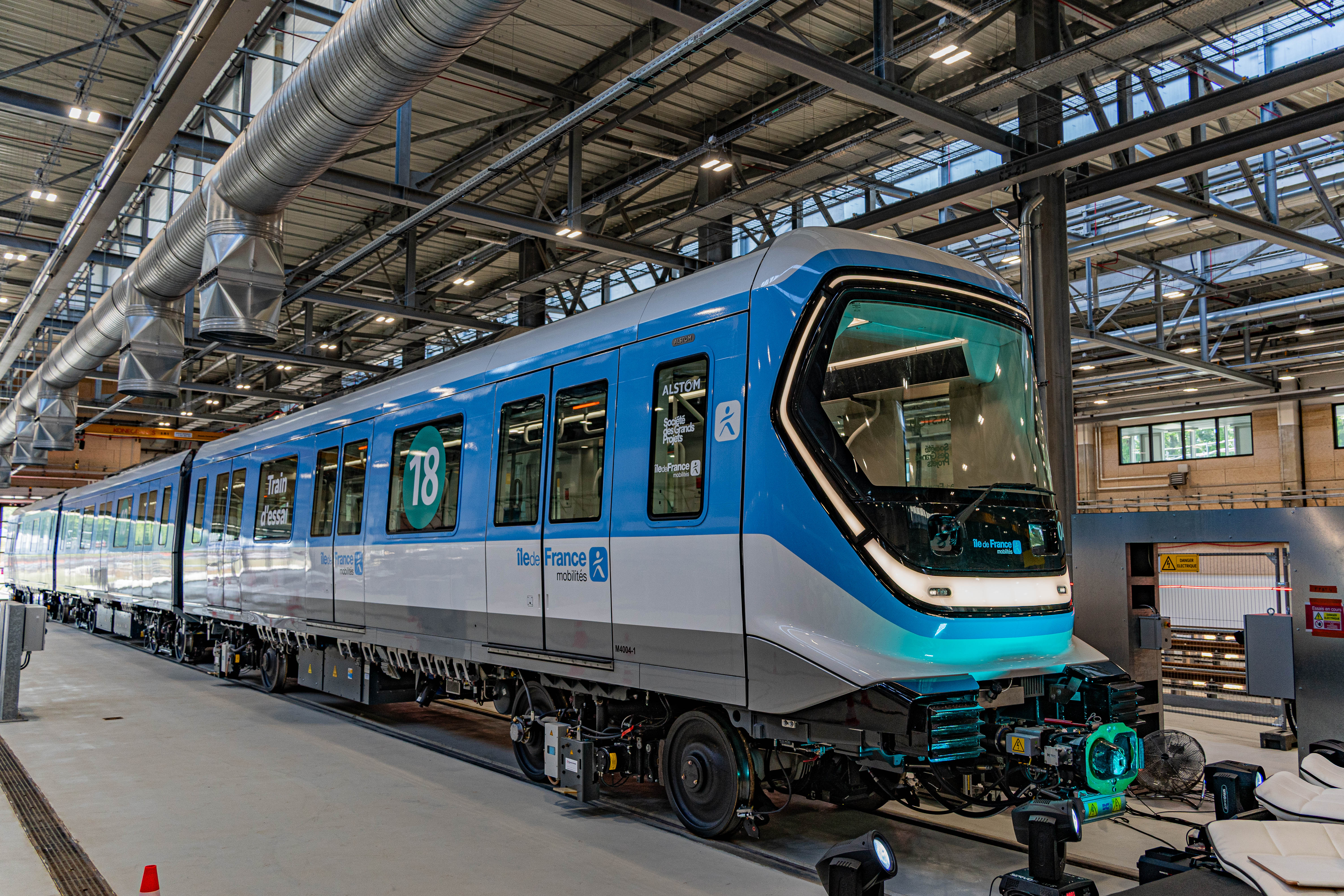
- First train presented at the inauguration of the MRV.
- In service: 2026 (planned)
- Manufacturer: Alstom
- Built at: Valenciennes
- Family name: Alstom Metropolis
- Constructed: 2025–present
- Entered service: 2026 (planned)
- Number under construction: 37 trainsets
- Number built: 10 trainsets (30 cars)
- Formation: 3-car sets
- Fleet numbers: 40xx
- Depot: Palaiseau
- Line served: Paris Metro Paris Metro Line 18

Specifications
- Train length: 45 m (148 ft)
- Car length: 15 m (49 ft)
- Width: 2.5 m (8.2 ft)
- Floor height: 1100mm
- Doors: 3 per side
- Traction system: Alstom OptONIX IGBT-VVVF
- HVAC: Fully air conditioned
- Electric systems: Third rail, 1,500 V DC
- Current collection: Contact shoe
- Braking systems: Electrodynamic, regenerative brake, disc brakes
- Safety systems: Alstom Urbalis Fluence train-centric moving block CBTC; ATC under ATO GoA 4 (UTO), with integrated onboard interlocking functions, centralised supervision (Iconis ATS) and ATP
- Coupling system: Dellner Type
- Multiple working: UM2 (In case of emergency)
- Track gauge: 1,435 mm (4 ft 8 1/2 in) standard gauge

MRV, project name, for Matériel Roulant Voyageurs (Passenger Rolling Stock) are the future rolling stock for the new Line 18 of the Paris Metro.

== Background ==
As part of the construction of Line 18 of the Paris metro, the Société du Grand Paris launched a call for tenders in the first quarter of 2019 for the acquisition of new self-driving trains and associated systems.

In October 2021, the Société du Grand Paris announced that the manufacturer Alstom had been selected to supply 37 trains from the Alstom Metropolis range with three cars, automation systems and centralized operating command stations for a total amount of 400 million euros. A first firm tranche of 15 trains for an amount of 230 million euros has been ordered for delivery from 2024 and commercial entry into service of the new trains should take place when Line 18 opens on its section from Massy - Palaiseau to CEA Saint-Aubin, scheduled for 2026.

The trains will be designed at the Alstom site in Petite-Forêt (Valenciennes).

== Description ==
The MRV are fully automated and have a length of 45 m (147 ft 7 21/32 in), with three cars with open-gangway connections. The capacity of a complete train is 498 places including 54 seats. Unlike the MR3V/MR6V, with a width of 2.8 m (9 ft 2 1/4 in), the MRV has a width of 2.5 m (8 ft 2 7/16 in), close to the 2.45 m (8 ft 15/32 in) train width of the older lines of the Paris Metro. The MRV will use third-rail power supply and its maximum commercial speed will be 100 km/h (62 mph).

Due to its unique characteristics, loading gauge, power supply and automation, the MRV will be specific to Line 18 and unique in France. The choice of a 1500V power supply by 3rd rail was motivated to avoid the installation of catenaries on the viaduct part, already widely criticized by the surrounding population (but not the university campuses), but especially by the CEA to avoid electromagnetic emissions from the catenaries. This will have an impact on the price of the trains, because they are very specific, on the interconnection with other lines, and on a risk of problems, technology previously non-existent.

=== Exterior ===
The first exterior designs of the trains were unveiled in late November 2021. Île-de-France Mobilités opened an online consultation in early December 2021 for the final choice of the front of the train out of three proposed variants. After 15 days of consultation the third proposal, named “Pure fluidity”, was selected.

== Formations ==
Line 18 will use driverless trains in a 3-car formation, (2M1T) It use a third rail under 1500V DC for its electricity supply.

As of 1 August 2026, 10 three-car sets were affected at Palaiseau workshop (4002 - 4011).

	<- Aéroport d'Orly/ Versailles Chantiers ->		
Car n°	1	2	3
Designation	M	R	M
Numbering	M40xx-1	R40xx-2	M40xx-3
equipement	VVVF	CP	VVVF

- VVVF: Inverters
- CP: Air compressor
- SIV: Static inverter
