= Paris Metro Line 17 =

Planned metro line in Île-de-France

Line 17
- Paris Metro Line 17

Overview
- Locale: Saint-Denis; La Courneuve; Le Bourget; Dugny; Le Blanc-Mesnil; Gonesse; Villepinte; Tremblay-en-France; Le Mesnil-Amelot
- Termini: Saint-Denis–Pleyel; Le Mesnil–Amelot
- Connecting lines: Paris Metro Paris Metro Line 14 Paris Metro Line 15 Paris Metro Line 16 RER RER B Tramways in Île-de-France Île-de-France tramway Line 1 Île-de-France tramway Line 11
- Stations: 8

Service
- System: Paris Metro
- Operator: Keolis
- Rolling stock: MR3V

History
- Planned opening: Autumn 2028 (Saint-Denis–Pleyel to Le Bourget–Aéroport); Autumn 2029 (Le Bourget - Aéroport to Parc des Expositions) late-2030 (full line) after 2030 (Saint-Denis–Pleyel to Nanterre-La Folie)

Technical
- Line length: 25 km (16 mi)
- Track gauge: 1,435 mm (4 ft 8 1/2 in) standard gauge
- Electrification: Overhead line, 1,500 V DC

Paris Metro Line 17 is one of four lines of the Grand Paris Express. It is planned to open in phases from 2027 through 2030. Sections will be above ground, including Parc des Expositions station.

== History ==
=== Proposed timeline ===
The line is planned to be opened in three stages:

- In autumn 2028, from Saint-Denis–Pleyel to Le Bourget–Aéroport,
- In autumn 2029, from Le Bourget–Aéroport to Parc des Expositions,
- In late-2030 from Parc des Expositions to Le Mesnil–Amelot.

For an opening after 2030, an extension from Saint-Denis–Pleyel to Nanterre–La Folie is under study.

The first opening stage was initially planned for 2024 to coincide with the 2024 Summer Olympics. Delays (partially due to the COVID-19 pandemic), the opening of the first phase was delayed in 2022, with opening planned in 2026. It is planned that the station Le Bourget–Aéroport will be opened together with the common trunk shared with Line 16. In February 2025, a further delay was announced, with the first phase now due to open in mid-2027, due to delays in the construction of line 15 which shares its automated driving system with lines 16 and 17. On 24 September 2026, it was announced that the opening of the first phase was postponed to autumn 2028, to autumn 2029 for the Le Bourget-Aéroport to Parc des Expositions section, and late-2030 for the rest of the line.

In May 2023, it was announced that the line will be operated by Keolis, while the infrastructure is managed by RATP.

Initially, a station was planned for the future Terminal 4 of Charles-de-Gaulle airport. However, the project for the new terminal was cancelled in 2021. In October 2024, it was announced that the corresponding metro station will not be built.

== Route and stations ==
=== Route ===
Map of the route of line 17 (in 2030)

Line 17 will connect the Plaine Commune employment area to Charles de Gaulle Airport. It will be possible to reach the latter from Paris by connecting with line 14 at Saint-Denis–Pleyel.

The line starts underground in Saint-Denis in Seine-Saint-Denis at the station Saint-Denis–Pleyel. It shares the same tracks as line 16. The station has connections to line 13 (via a pedestrian walkway), line 14, line 15 (same-platform interchange of the departure platform of line 17 with line 15 towards Noisy–Champs station) and the RER D. Track connections allow for the exchange of equipment with line 15.

The line, running parallel to line 15, passes under the Paris-Nord station rail line and then follows Avenue François-Mitterrand. It passes under the Landy tunnel, then runs alongside La Plaine – Stade de France station and the Stade de France station on line 15, before turning northeast. In La Courneuve, it serves the La Courneuve – Six Routes station, which is also served by line 16 and the T1 tramway, then heads east towards Le Bourget, serving the Le Bourget RER station, which connects with the RER B and the T11 Express tramway. This station has four tracks with two island platforms because lines 16 and 17 separate here (line 17 trains stop on the outer tracks).

Each track is now in a single tunnel slanting north. The northbound track passes under line 16 before the two tracks meet and run northeast parallel to the N 2 before serving Paris–Le Bourget Airport. The line runs along the RN17 and the runways of Le Bourget Airport, then enters the town of Gonesse and heads east to the station Triangle de Gonesse.

The line then comes above ground and crosses the A1 and A3 highways while running alongside the A104. It passes a track connection to a maintenance center in Aulnay-sous-Bois, which is shared with line 16, and then bends northwards along the RER B tracks before serving the station Parc des Expositions in Villepinte, which connects with the RER B.

The viaduct then heads east along the D40, before the line goes back underground and bypasses Tremblay-en-France to the north. The tunnel runs parallel to the LGV Interconnexion Est and passes under the runways of Charles-de-Gaulle airport. The line arrives at the Aéroport Charles-de-Gaulle Terminal 2 station located parallel to the SNCF station and the CDGVAL station underneath Terminal 2. It then passes over the site that was intended for the Aéroport Charles-de-Gaulle Terminal 4 station (both the planned terminal and the station have since been cancelled), and then heads northeast to arrive at the above-ground terminus station Le Mesnil-Amelot.

=== System map ===
The stations of line 17 in 2030.

== Rolling stock ==
In July 2018, Alstom was selected to supply the rolling stock for the Grand Paris Express project at a cost of €1.3bn for 183 trains. In March 2019, an order of 23 3-car trains was confirmed, albeit that the trains will be shared between lines 16 and 17. Shorter 3-car trains were ordered to reduce construction and operational costs, and because the lines are forecast to have a lower level of ridership than Line 15.

The specifications of the trains travelling lines 16 and 17 and their operation are as follows:

- Train width: 2.80 metres (9 ft 2 in) minimum
- Train name: Alstom Metropolis MR3V
- Train length: 54 metres (177 ft), made up of 3 cars with full-open interior gangways
- Train capacity: around 500 passengers
- Rails: iron
- Electric traction current: 1500 volt direct current via pantograph and contact wires
- Operation: Fully automated
- Maximum speed: 120 kilometres per hour (75 mph)
- Operating speed: 55 kilometres per hour (34 mph)
- Average interval: 3 to 4 minutes
- Minimum interval: 2 minutes
