= MR3V/MR6V =

Future Paris Metro train

3000 Series / 6000 series (MR3V / MR6V)
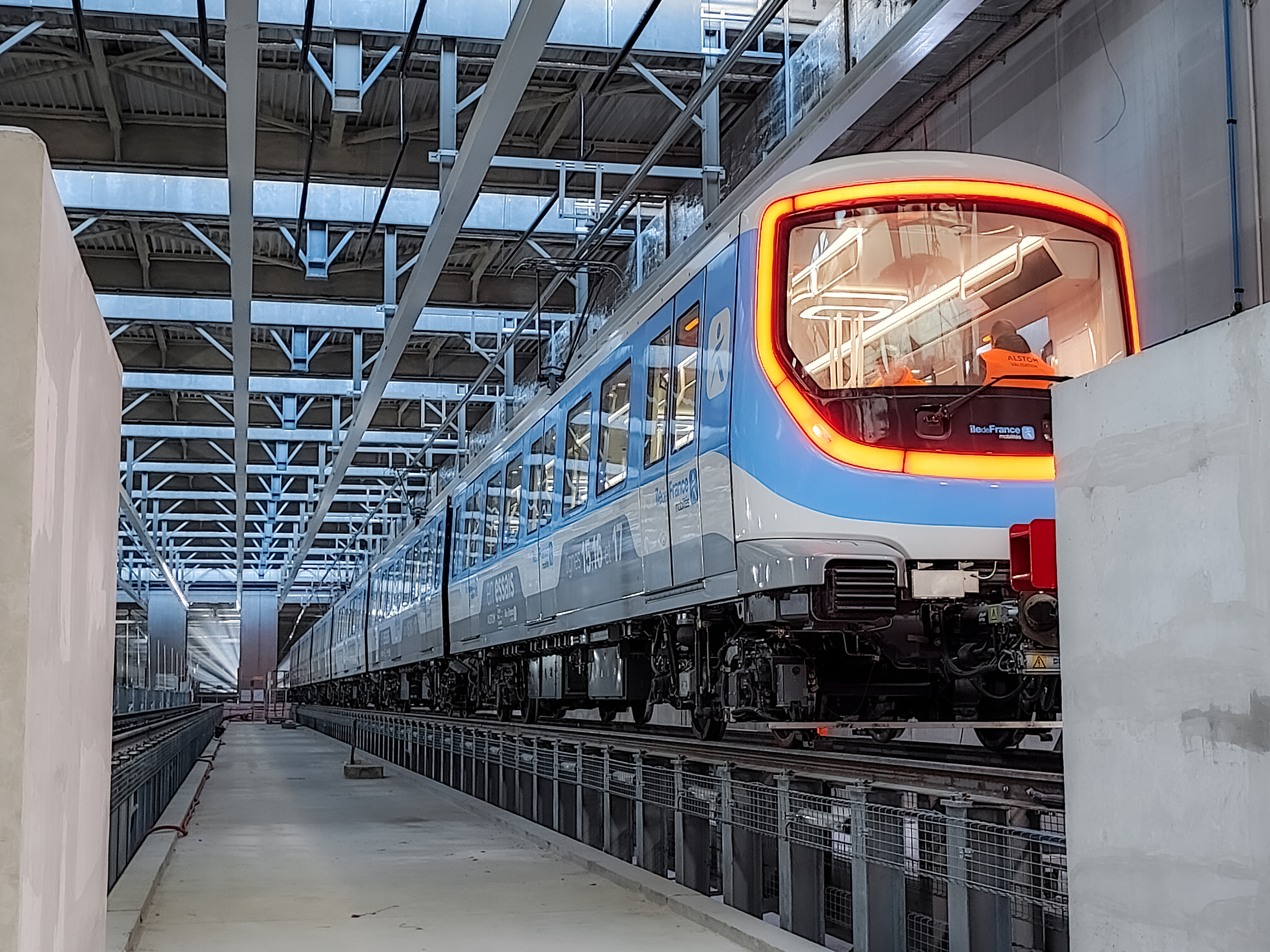
- In service: April 2027 (planned)
- Manufacturer: Alstom
- Built at: Valenciennes
- Family name: Metropolis
- Constructed: 2020–present
- Number under construction: 3000 series : 49 trainsets; 6000 series : 128 trainsets
- Number built: 3000 series : 3 trainsets (9 cars); 6000 series : 16 trainsets (96 cars)
- Number in service: all in test (dynamic and CBTC test for now)
- Formation: 3000 series : 3 cars per trainset; 6000 series : 6 cars per trainset
- Fleet numbers: 30xx and 61xxx
- Capacity: MR3V: 500 per train; MR6V: 1,000 per train
- Operators: MR3V: Keolis; MR6V: ORA (RATP Dev, Alstom and ComfortDelGro)
- Depots: 3000 series : Aulnay; 6000 series : Champigny - Bondy (under construction for the latter)
- Lines served: 3000 series : 6000 series :

Specifications
- Train length: 3000 series : 54 m (177 ft 2 in); 6000 series : 108 m (354 ft 4 in)
- Car length: 18 m (59 ft 1 in)
- Width: 2.8 m (9 ft 2 in)
- Platform height: 1100mm
- Doors: 3 per side
- Maximum speed: 110 km/h (68 mph)
- Weight: MR3V: 100 t (220,000 lb); MR6V: 200 t (440,000 lb)
- Traction system: Alstom OptONIX IGBT-VVVF
- Acceleration: 1.1m/s²
- Deceleration: 1.2m/s²
- HVAC: fully air conditioned
- Electric systems: Overhead line, 1,500 V DC
- Current collection: Pantograph
- UIC classification: MR3V: Bo′Bo′+2′2′+Bo′Bo′; MR6V: Bo′Bo′+2′2′+Bo′Bo′+Bo′Bo′+2′2′+Bo′Bo′
- Braking systems: Electrodynamic, regenerative, disc, eddy current
- Safety systems: Siemens Trainguard MT moving block CBTC ATC under ATO GoA 4 (UTO), with subsystems of ATP, Trainguard MT ATS and CBI
- Coupling system: Dellner type
- Headlight type: LeD
- Track gauge: 1,435 mm (4 ft 8 1/2 in) standard gauge

MR3V/6V project name, for "Matériel Roulant 3 Voitures / 6 Voitures" (Rolling Stock 3 Cars / 6 Cars) are a series of electric multiple units built by Alstom to equip Lines 15, 16 and 17 of the Paris Metro. The technical name derived from their registration is 3000 series for three-car trains, and 6000 series for six-car trains.

== Background ==
In May 2018, the Société du Grand Paris announced that the manufacturer Alstom was approached to win the contracts for the trains on lines 15, 16 and 17 of the Grand Paris Express. The contract provides for the delivery of a maximum of 948 cars, which are divided into 133 six-car trains for line 15 and 50 three-car trains for lines 16 and 17, all based on the Metropolis family trains.

On 20 September 2018, the contract was officially signed with Alstom for the manufacture of rolling stock for a total cost of 1.3 billion euros and, quickly, a sketch of the design of this rolling stock was unveiled. The first 3-car sets were seen at the beginning of November 2021 in dynamic tests in the Alstom rail test centre in Valenciennes.

During the year 2021 the first images of the trains were unveiled on twitter. In 2022 tests were carried out on a test track at an Alstom factory in the north of France.

On June 22, 2023, the first MR6V train arrived at the Champigny depot on line 15. The second arrived on July 3 and will allow static tests to be carried out until November 2023, when dynamic tests will begin on the now completed East section, of line 15.

== Description ==
The MR3V / MR6V are fully automated with open-gangway connections. They are planned in two versions: with six cars (MR6V), for a length of 108 m (354 ft 3 31/32 in), and with three cars (MR3V), for a length of 54 m (177 ft 1 31/32 in). Unlike the classic 2.40 m (7 ft 10 1/2 in) gauge of the Paris metro, these trains will be 2.80 m (9 ft 2 1/4 in) wide. The capacity of the trains is respectively, for the compositions of three and six cars, 500 and 1000 seats, 20% of which are seated. They will be powered by a 1,500 V DC overhead catenary, a first for the Metro, as all other rolling stock are powered by third rails.

=== Exterior ===
The exterior design of the trains was unveiled in early December 2018 with three variants. A consultation open to the public took place during December 2018 to allow the choice of the chosen design. After 20 days of consultation and 13,000 voters, it was the second design with "encompassing lines for the nose of the train" that was chosen by 40% of respondents.

Since the construction of Metropolis-type trains is modular, it is easy to see that the 6-car trainsets are actually three-car trainsets coupled together without a driver's cab, perfectly visible from the positioning of the pantographs and the organization MT.

=== Interior ===
The interior of the trains will have the new IDFM seats.

== Formations ==
=== 3000 Series (MR3V) ===
will use driverless 3-car trainsets, MR3V. (2M1T). The 3-car trainsets are organized in 2M1T As of 1 August 2026, 3 three-car sets were affected at Aulnay workshop.

	<- Pleyel (St Denis)/ Noisy-Champs ->		
Car n°	1 <>	2	3 <>
Designation	M	R	M
Numbering	M30xx-1	R30xx-2	M30xx-3
equipement	VVVF	CP	VVVF

	<- Pleyel (St Denis)/ Noisy-Champs ->		
Car n°	1 <>	2	3 <>
Designation	M	R	M
Numbering	M30xx-1	R30xx-2	M30xx-3
equipement	VVVF	CP	VVVF

- Car number 1 and 3 have 2 pantographs, two of which are a spare.
- VVVF: Inverters
- CP: Air compressor
- SIV: Static inverter

=== 6000 Series (MR6V) ===
will use driverless trains in a 6-car formation, MR6V (4M2T). The 6-car trainsets are organized in 4M2T. As of 1 August 2026, 16 six-car sets were affected at Champigny workshop.

	<- Pont de Sèvres (West side) Noisy-Champs (East Side) ->					
Car n°	1 >	2	3 <	4 >	5	< 6
Designation	M	R	M	M	R	M
Numbering	M61xx-1	R61xx-2	M61xx-3	M61xx-4	R61xx-5	M61xx-6
equipement	VVVF	CP -SIV	VVVF	VVVF	CP	VVVF

- VVVF: Inverters
- CP: Air compressor
- SIV: Static inverter
