= EuropaCity =

EuropaCity was a French planned development outside Paris, initially scheduled to open in 2027. It was a joint project by the French real estate company Immochan and the Chinese investment company Dalian Wanda. It was introduced to the public as a planned 800,000 square metre cultural, recreational, and retail development to be located in the Triangle de Gonesse in Ile-de-France north of Paris. The main purpose of the project was to combine dense urban development with open space. The international invited competition for its design was won by the architectural group Bjarke Ingels Group, announced in spring 2013. Due to controversies on the project's environmental sustainability and local opposition, the French government withdrew its support on 8 November 2019, and the project was abandoned.

== Location ==
The project location was in the northern suburbs outside of Paris, in Triangle de Gonesse. While the region is currently largely agricultural, it also falls along the route from the Charles de Gaulle Airport to Paris and is, therefore, an area that attracts a heavy amount of traffic. The creation and implementation of EuropaCity would have taken place as part of a wider development known as the Triangle de Gonesse urban project or the Triangle de Gonesse development project.

The purpose of this development was to provide a connection between urban Paris, the suburbs, and the surrounding farmland. The ideal project design is one that seeks to facilitate and foster the connections between these diverse, but interdependent areas through the creation of a dense, urban development Additionally, the development will seek to combine the efficiency of the urban setting with the healthfulness of country living.

== Design competition ==
The design of EuropaCity was awarded through an international invited competition limited to four international architectural teams: Bjarke Ingels Group (Denmark), Manuelle Gautrand (France), Snøhetta (Norway), and Valode & Pistre (France).

The decision process consisted of two phases. The first aspect considered how well each group accounted for an inclusion of EuropaCity within the greater area of Roissy-en-France and within the public development project already taking place in and around Gonesse. The second stage focused more directly on the architectural sketch itself.

Two presentations were given during the span of time that the competition endured, the first at the Maison de l’Architecture in Ile-de-France in October 2012 and the second in the cultural space in Gonesse Coulanges between December 2012-February 2013.

== Controversies ==
In March 2011, the collective for the Gonesse Triangle created itself following the EuropaCity announcement after considering it a GPI Grand Projet Inutile, translated literally Great Useless Project. It accounts fifteen NGOs, four of them department — Les Amis de la Terre Val-d'Oise, Environnement 93, MNLE 93 et Val-d'Oise Environnement — and has received the support of FNE Île-de-France

== Planned design ==
The winning design for EuropaCity is centered on the vision of "urban form that combines dense city and open landscapes". Bjarke Ingels Group's collaborators on the project include architectural firms Tess, Transsolar, Base, Transitec, and Michel Forgue. EuropaCity is set to be the "largest cultural, commercial, and leisure destination in Europe". This enormous development will cost around $2 billion to construct and will consist of somewhere around 500 shops, hotels, amusement parks, and a water and snow recreational facility. It is estimated that the development will lead to the creation of at least 17,500 permanent jobs and will attract up to 30 million visitors per year.

BIG’s design aims to have all activity surrounding the main theme of celebrating Europe's diversity through the experience of urban life and cultures. The surrounding living space will be connected to the dense, urban fabric of EuropaCity. To attract maximum numbers of visitors, the development will be serviced by the RER, the rapid transit system in France that services Paris and its surrounding suburbs. Overall, EuropaCity will serve as a means to examine the urban and natural potential of the space.

All services, recreation, and commerce will be organised along a pedestrian walkway that forms a continuous loop. The continuous, circular walkway is simplistic and will allow pedestrians to take in the full scope of the city. Additionally, all of the interwoven, curvilinear walkways are designed to mimic the intimacy of Paris streets. The development will consist entirely of dense, urban, multi-use space that encompasses a "mix of shopping, entertainment, and cultural activities". Aside from the RER services bringing people to and from the city, a public bicycle system and electric buses will provide quick and efficient transportation within the city itself.

The roof is designed to be a landscape of green park space complete with valleys and ridges, a result of abiding by the zoning codes and height restrictions that vary across the area. Not only will the green roof provide scenic views of the Parisian skyline, but it will also serve a number of functional services. It will provide insulation, treat grey water, and infiltrate rainwater for use in the city. This green roof will serve to epitomize the sustainability ideals and public leisure space that EuropaCity is all about.
