= RATP bus network =

Bus network in Paris, France

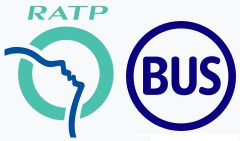

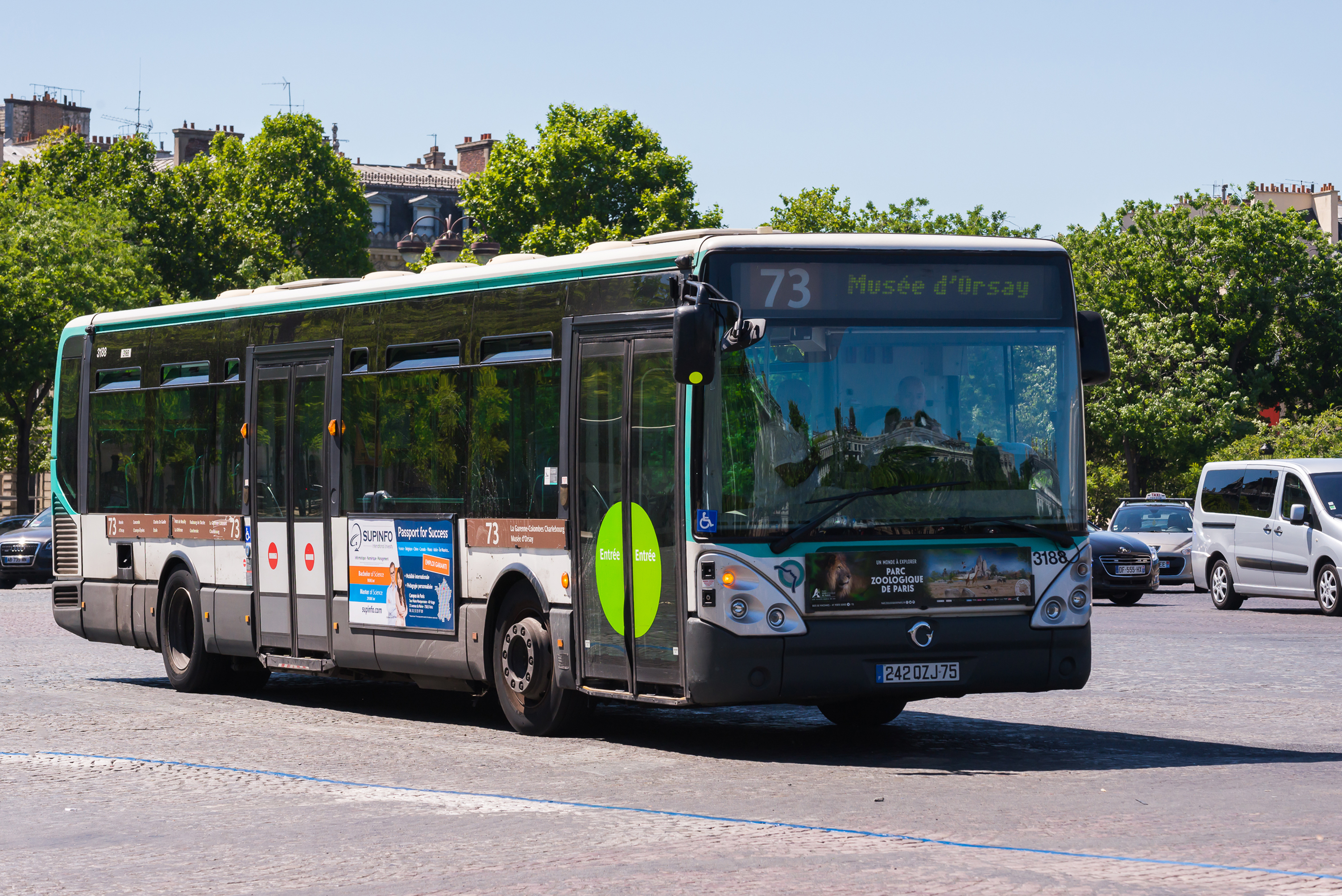
- Bus 73 heading towards the Musée d'Orsay
- Founded: 1906
- Commenced operation: 1945
- Headquarters: Paris, France
- Service area: Paris and its near suburbs
- Service type: Bus and Express Bus
- Routes: 315
- Stops: around 12,000
- Destinations: Paris; Inner suburbs; Paris Airports (Orly & CDG)
- Stations: Métro, RER and Transilien stations
- Depots: RATP Bus centers
- Fleet: City and express buses (≈ 5 000)
- Daily ridership: From 1.5 million travelers (on Sunday) and 2.4 million travelers (on Saturday) to 3.5 million travelers (on weekday) (2017)
- Annual ridership: 1.1 billion travelers (2017)
- Operator: RATP
- Chief executive: President of RATP
- Website: www.ratp.fr

The RATP bus network covers the entire territory of the city of Paris and the vast majority of its near suburbs. Operated by the Régie Autonome des Transports Parisiens (RATP), this constitutes a dense bus network complementary to other public transport networks, all organized and financed by Île-de-France Mobilités.

Other suburban bus lines are managed by private operators grouped in a consortium known as Optile (Organisation professionnelle des transports d'Île-de-France), an association of 80 private bus operators holding exclusive rights on their lines. There are approximately 9500 buses serving public transportation across the Paris region, all operators included.

== Network ==
RATP operates:

- 70 lines with a route exclusively or mainly on the territory of the city of Paris including:
  - 64 lines numbered from 20 to 96
  - the PC line completing (with) a circular transport service surrounding Paris's borders along the Boulevards des Maréchaux
  - 4 out of the 5 specially identified parisian circular bus lines designated as "Lignes Traverse": 501 , 513 , 518 and 519
- 194 lines with a route exclusively or mainly in the near suburbs of Paris including:
  - 89 lines numbered from 101 to 199
  - 57 lines numbered from 201 to 299
  - 49 lines numbered from 301 to 399
- a dozen lines (numbered in the 400 series) subcontracted by local public transport companies belonging to the Optile group
- several "urban" line services numbered in the 500 series but generally designated by a trade name, covering small suburban shuttle services and often subsidized by covered cities
- the "Tootbus" tourist lines
- the lines of the "Titus" and "Valouette" networks
- several temporary lines created to cover passenger shifts along a future subway or tram line extension (such as line 512 before northern extension of towards the town hall of Aubervilliers or now-former line 528 before northern extension of from Saint Lazare train station to the town hall of Saint Ouen
- several lines kept in service to cover passenger shifts prior to subway or tram line extensions or creations (such as line 285 before southern extension of from Orly Airport to Juvisy train station, or 183 before extension of towards said airport)
- Some routes only run during rushing hours (ex. 247 278 ) or during school days ( 355 only)
- 32 night shift lines (including two subcontracted) grouped in the Noctilien night bus network

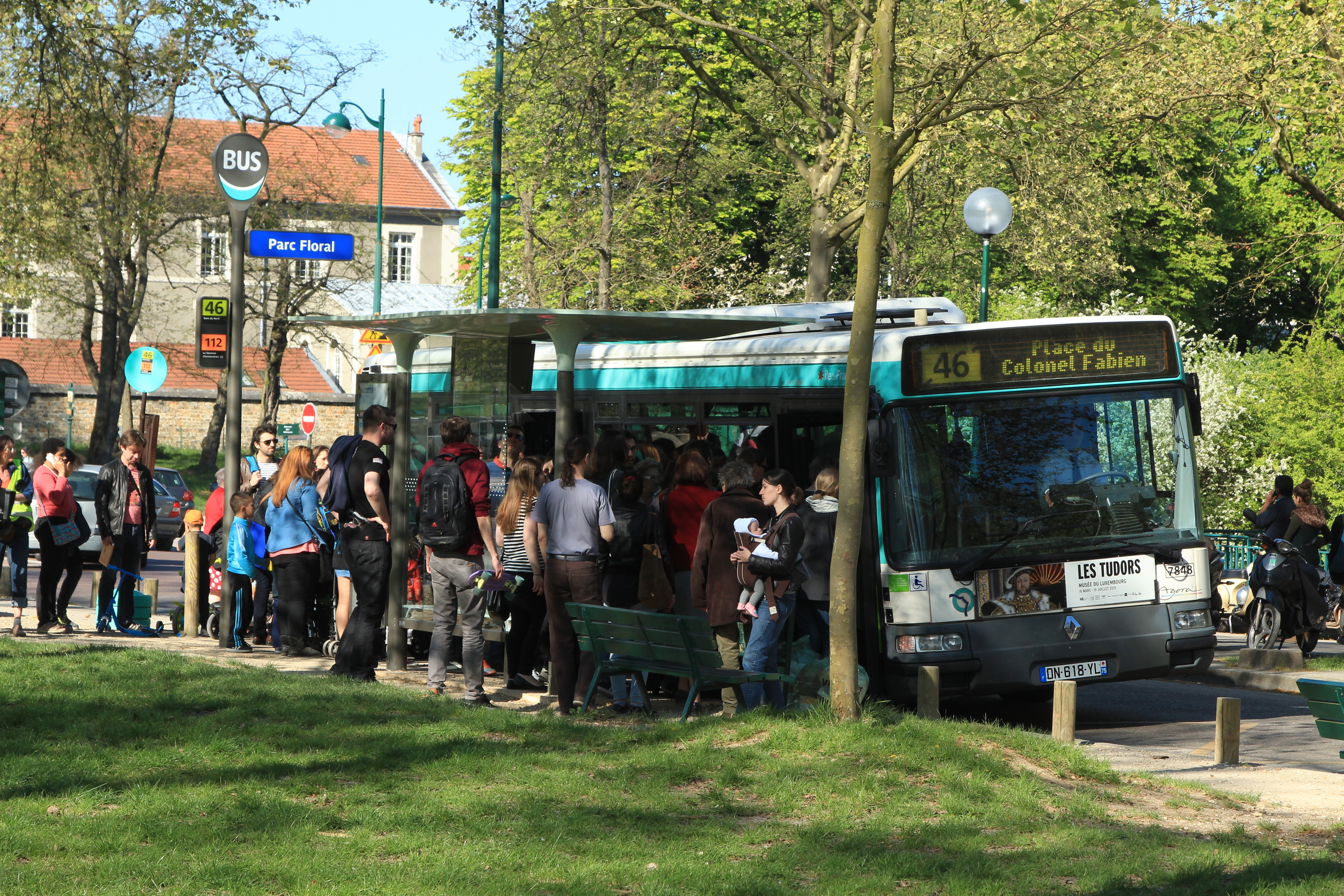
Bus 46 at Parc floral stop

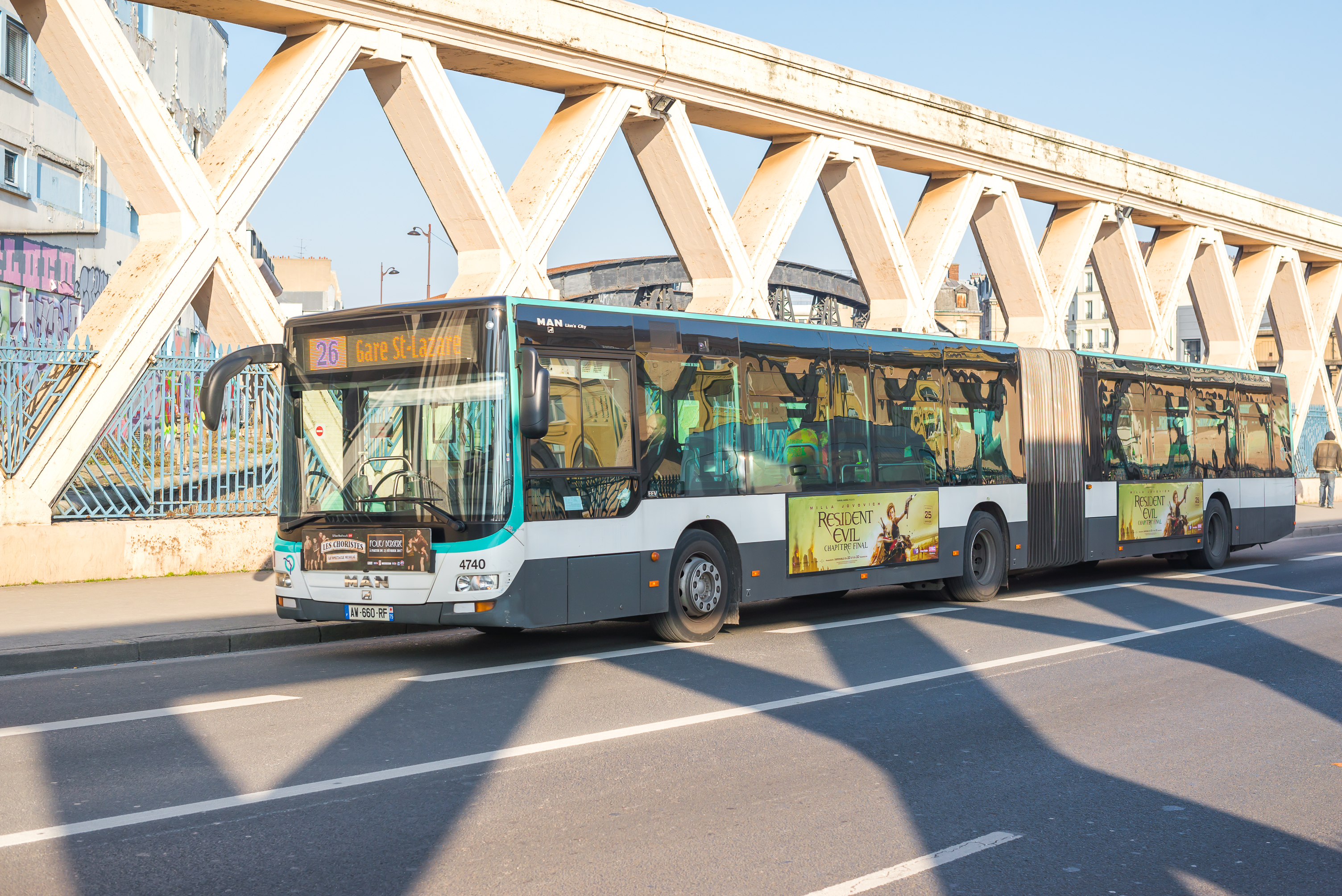
Bus 26 crossing the Gare de l'Est rail lines

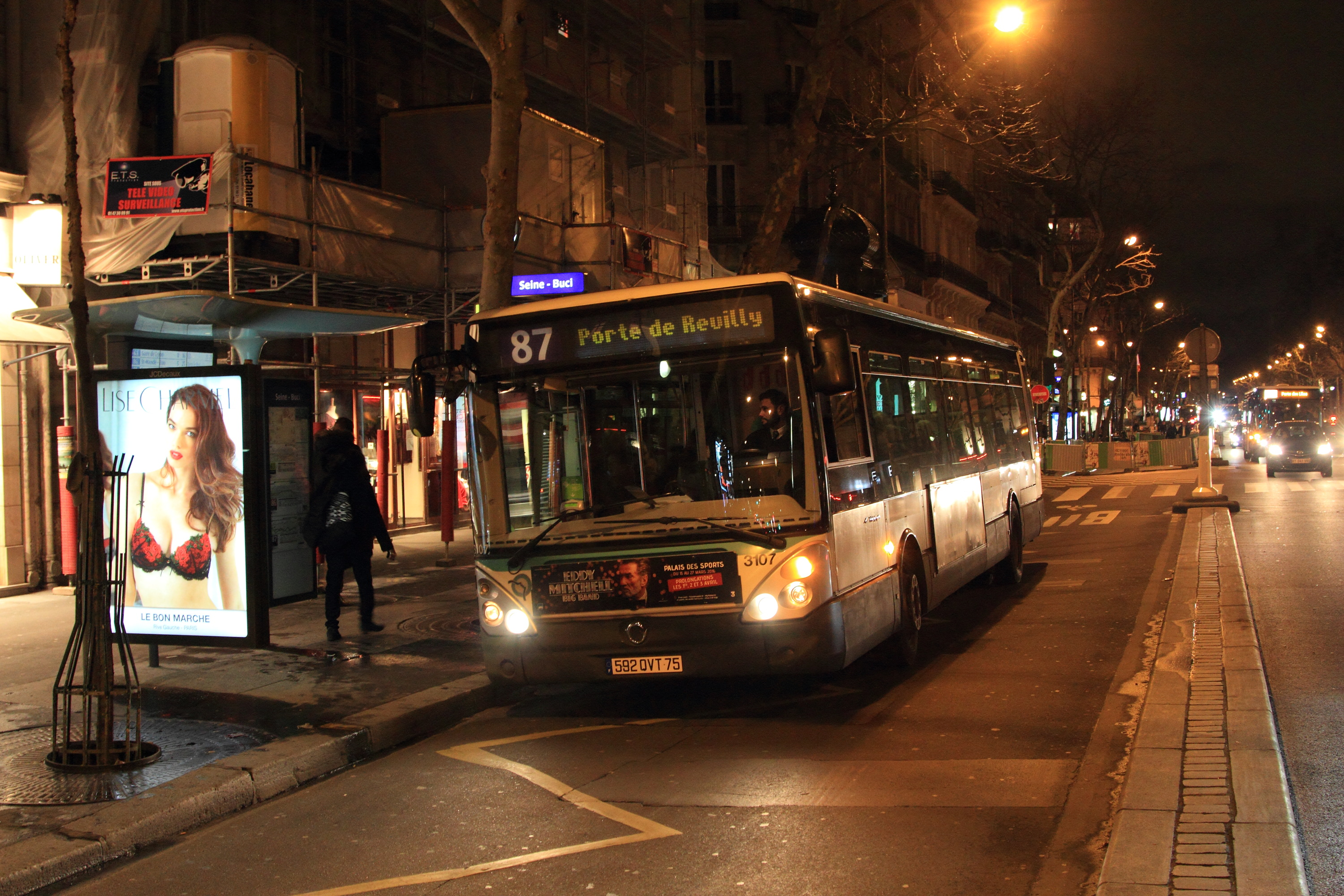
Bus 87 at Seine–Buci stop

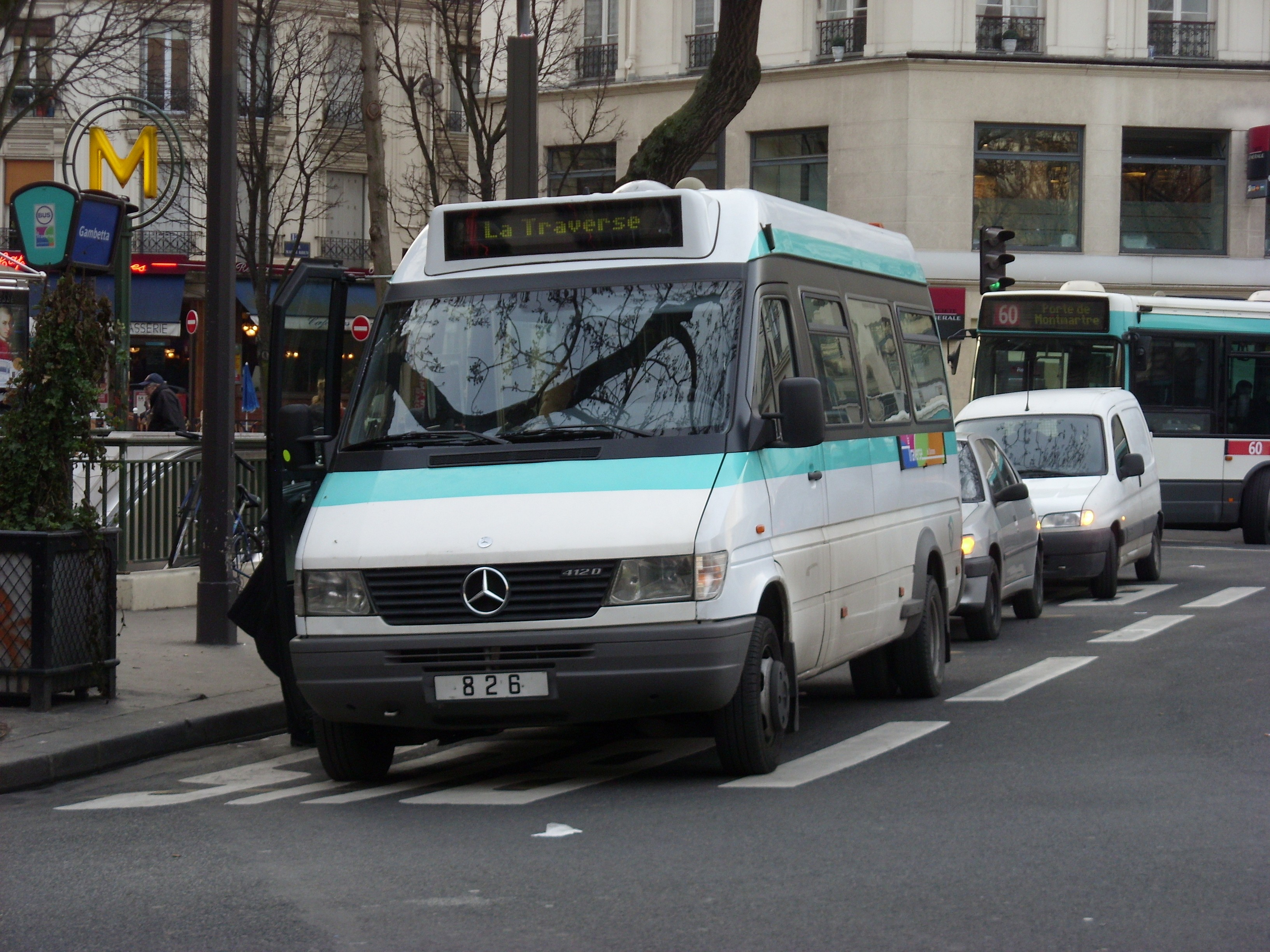
Bus 501 ( Traverse Charonne )

Different bus models running in the RATP network in Paris.

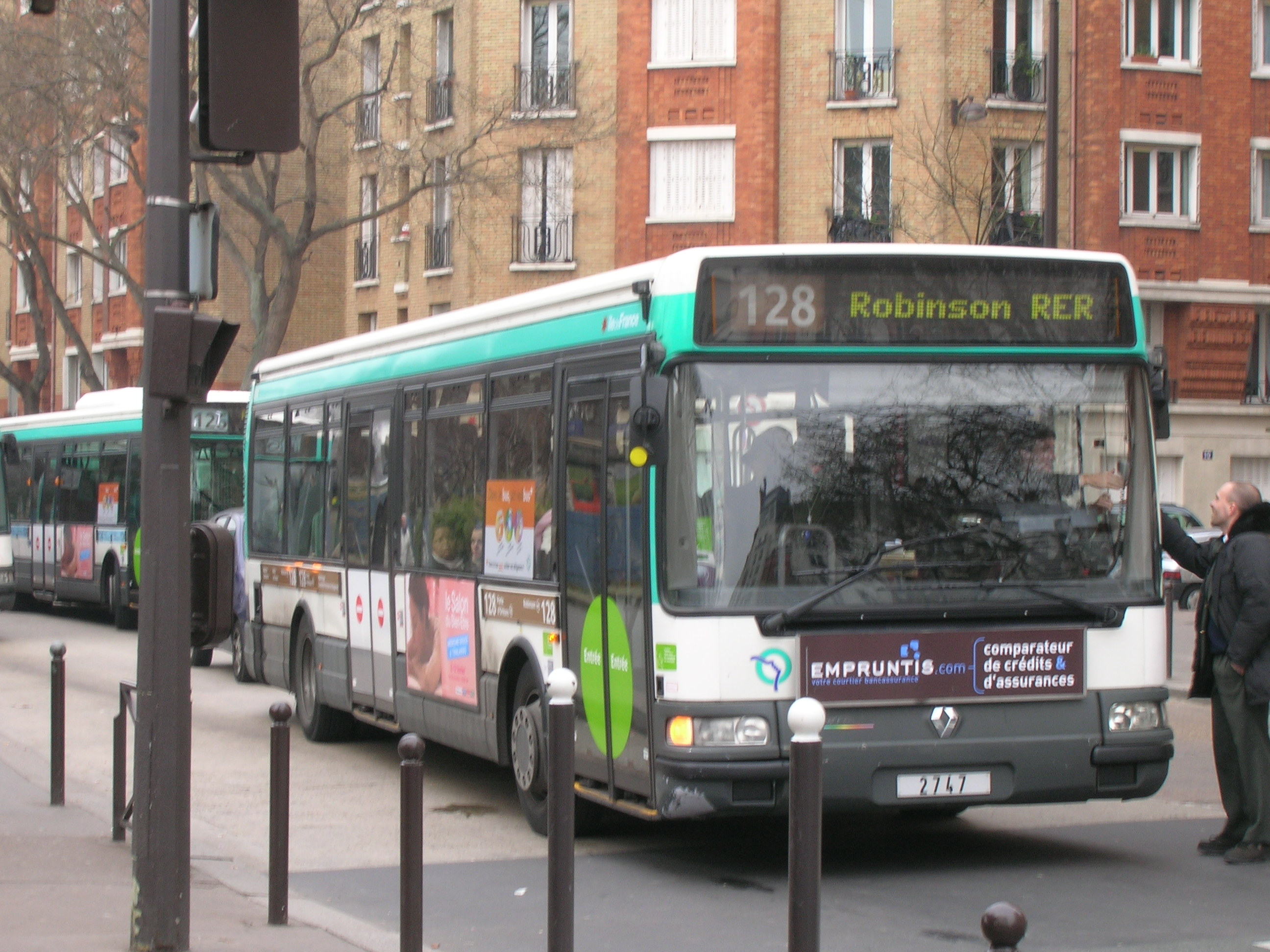
Bus 128 at its departure, Porte d'Orléans

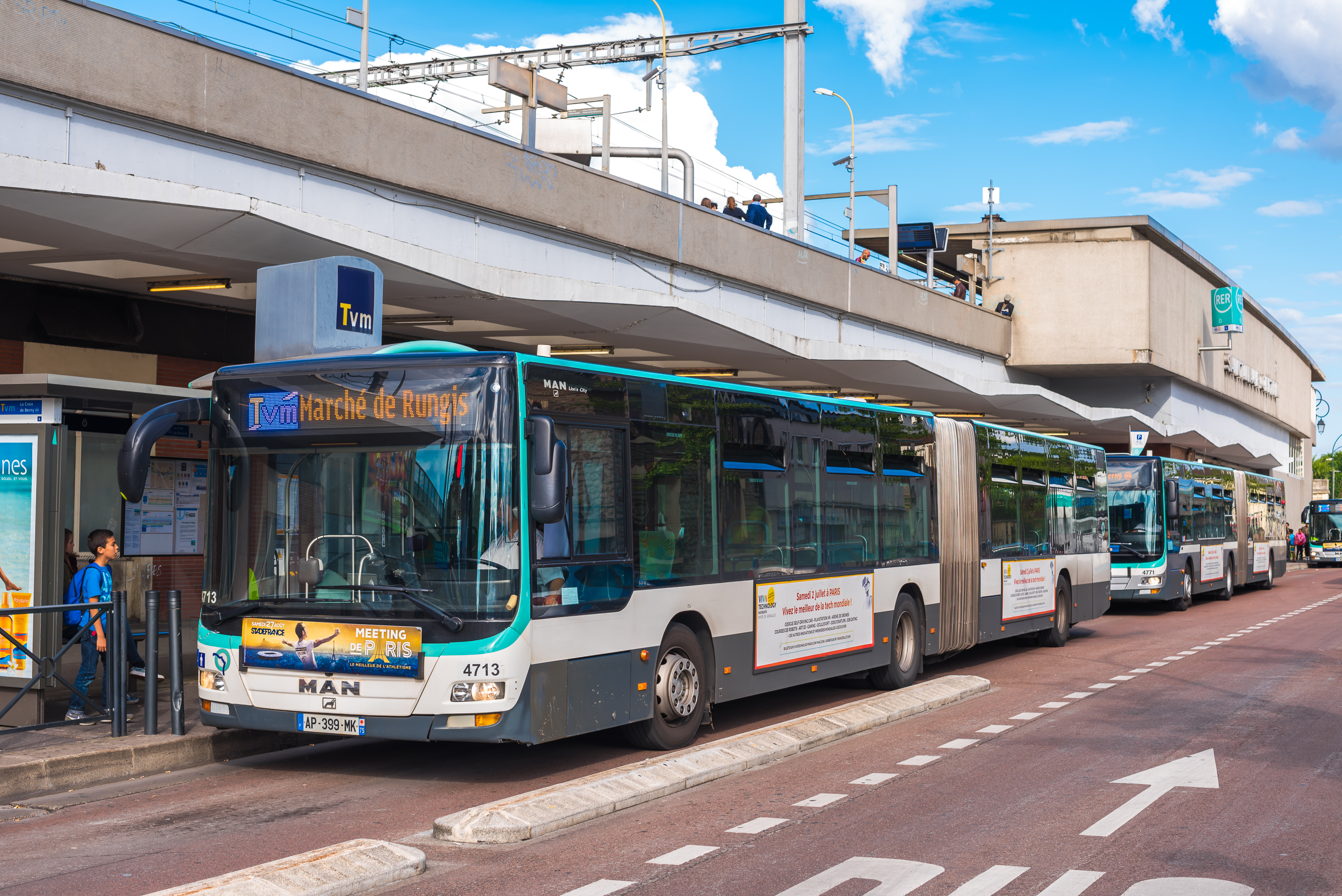
Bus TVM at its departure, Saint-Maur–Créteil

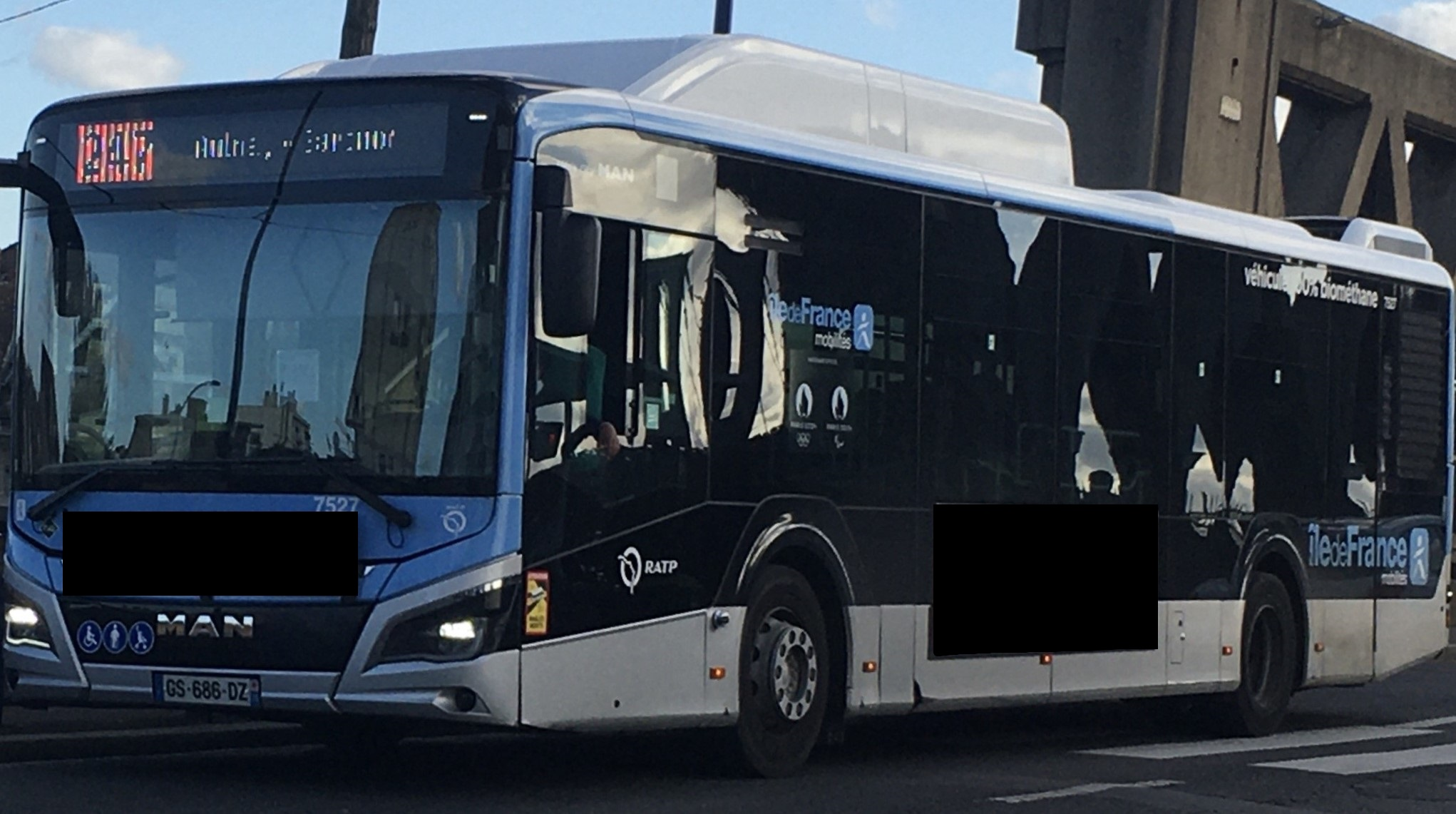
A MAN Lion's City 12 Efficient Hybrid on route 247 at Drancy; route 247 is, along with route 278 (not pictured), an RATP route that only runs during peak hours.

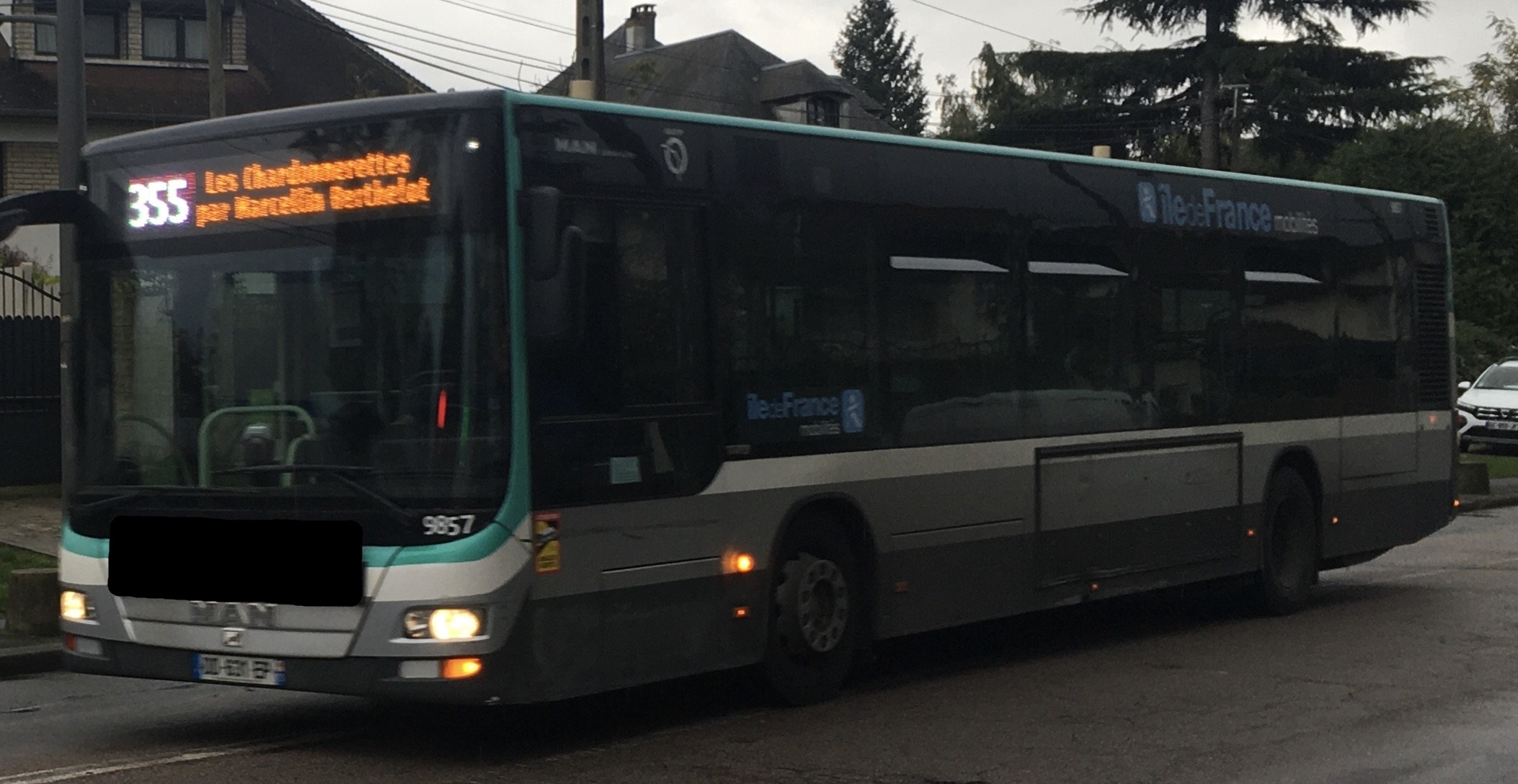
A MAN Lion's City on route 355 , the only RATP route that runs only on school days.

Different bus models running in the RATP network in the suburbs of Paris.

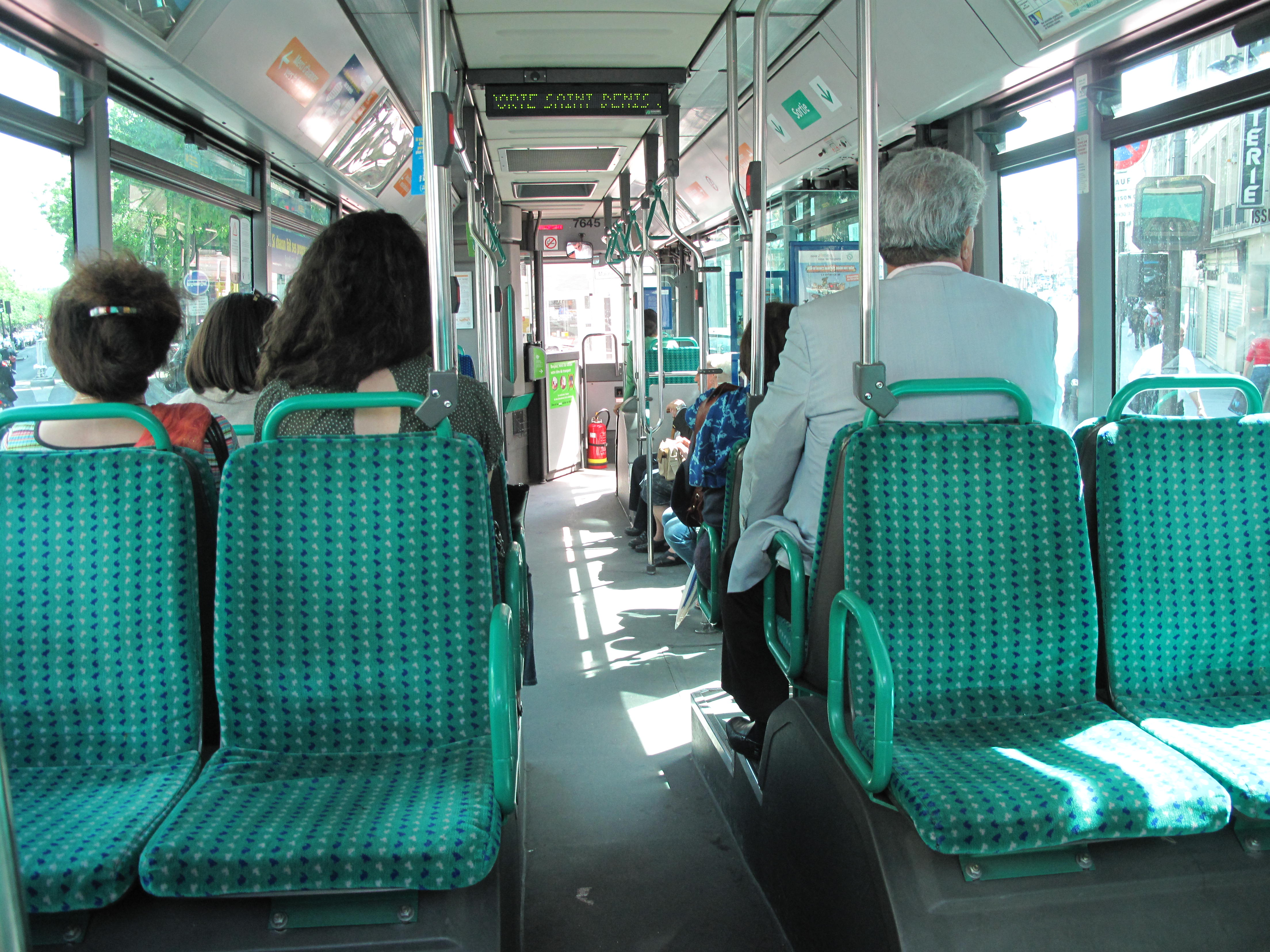
Inside an RATP bus

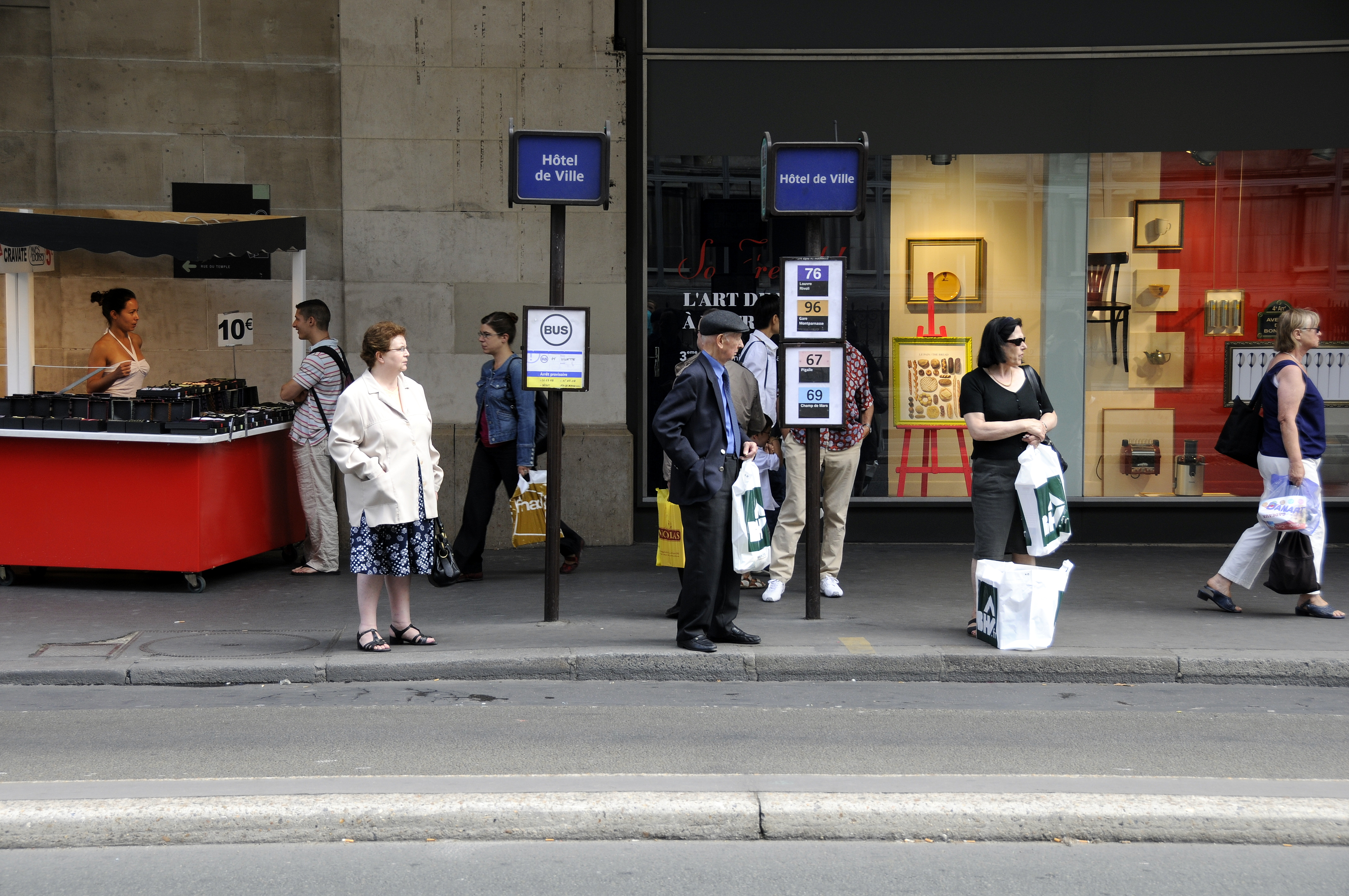
Hôtel de Ville Bus stop in Paris.

Interior and bus stop.

== Routes ==
RATP bus lines operating mainly in the city proper of Paris, are named with a two-digit code number called "indice". Bus lines operated mainly in the suburbs are named with a three-digit number code.

RATP uses the numbers 20 to 96 for lines operated mainly in the city proper (1 to 19 are unused to avoid confusion with Metro lines); along with PC bus line (line 100) which runs along the Boulevard des Maréchaux section that is not yet covered by (Tramway lines 3a & 3b) . All this according to an organized scheme used since public transportation reorganization post-WWII.

The first digit represents the sector in Paris where the line's starting point is located:

- 2x representing Gare Saint-Lazare
- 3x representing Gare de l'Est
- 4x representing Gare du Nord
- 5x representing Opéra and overall Rive Droite
- 6x representing Austerlitz or Gare de Lyon train stations
- 7x represents Châtelet and overall Center of Paris (along Rivoli Street)
- 8x represents Quartier Latin and overall Rive Gauche
- 9x represents Gare Montparnasse.

The digit number represents the outermost arrondissement the line finishes (or crosses Paris' borders) in:

- x2 represents the 16th arrondissement (from Pont du Garigliano to Porte Maillot)
- x3 and x4 represent the 17th arrondissement (from Porte Maillot to Porte d'Asnières for lines ending in 3, from Porte de Clichy to Porte des Poissonniers for lines ending in 4)
- x5 represents the 18th arrondissement and the 19th arrondissement (from Porte de la Chapelle to Porte des Lilas)
- x6 represents the 20th arrondissement and the 12th arrondissement (from Porte de Bagnolet to Porte de Charenton)
- x7 represents the 13th arrondissement (from Quai d'Ivry to Cité Universitaire)
- x8 represents the 14th arrondissement (from Montsouris to Porte de Vanves)
- x9 represents the 15th arrondissement (from Porte de Vanves to Pont du Garigliano)

0 and 1 are used as "wildcards" for lines whose rightful indice is already taken, or for lines ending inside of Paris (40 or 91 for example).

A deep reorganization of the Paris bus network took place on April the 20th 2019. Although it didn't change the overall scheme mentioned above, it brought several irregularities, such as lines 20 21 & 24 no longer starting from Saint Lazare train station while brand new line 25 doesn't even approach it, line 30 now cut long before the Gare de l'Est, line 40 that doesn't even approach the Gare du Nord, or lines 71 & 77 that do not start from the center of Paris.

== Bus services ==
RATP operates 70 bus lines within the city of Paris proper, and a little over 200 bus lines in Paris suburbs.

In 2017, 1.15 billion journeys were made on RATP bus lines, including 382 million journeys on Paris lines and 768 million journeys on suburbs lines.

=== Paris buses ===
Bus	Between	And
20	Levallois–Louison Bobet	Porte des Lilas
21	Porte de Saint-Ouen	Stade Charléty–Porte de Gentilly
22	Gare Saint-Lazare	Porte de Saint-Cloud
24	Panthéon (Gare d'Austerlitz additional shuttles at peak hours)	Ecole Vétérinaire de Maisons-Alfort
25	Bibliothèque François Mitterrand	Vitry-sur-Seine–Duras (no service on end of evenings & on weekends)
26	Gare Saint-Lazare	Nation
27	Gare Saint-Lazare	Porte d'Ivry
28	Porte de Clichy	Gare Montparnasse
29	Gare Saint-Lazare	Porte de Montempoivre
30	Pigalle	Hôpital Européen Georges-Pompidou
31	Gare de l'Est	Charles de Gaulle–Étoile
32	Gare de l'Est (Gare Saint-Lazare on evenings & on Sundays)	Porte d'Auteuil
35	Gare de l'Est	Mairie d'Aubervilliers
38	Porte de la Chapelle	Porte d'Orléans
39	Gare du Nord	Issy–Frères Voisin
40	Jules Joffrin –Mairie du 18è	Le Peletier via Sacré-Cœur
42	Gare Saint-Lazare	Boulogne–Île Seguin
43	Gare du Nord	Neuilly-sur-Seine–Bagatelle
45	Concorde	Aubervilliers–France-Asie
46	Gare du Nord	Château de Vincennes
47	Châtelet	Fort du Kremlin-Bicêtre
48	Gare du Nord	Porte des Lilas
52	Opéra (Charles de Gaulle–Étoile on evenings)	Parc de Saint-Cloud (Porte d'Auteuil on evenings)
54	Porte d'Aubervilliers	Asnières–Gennevilliers–Gabriel Péri
56	Porte de Clignancourt	Château de Vincennes
57	Porte de Bagnolet –Louis Ganne	Arcueil-Laplace
58	Châtelet	Vanves–Lycée Michelet
59	Place d'Italie	Gare de Clamart
60	Gambetta	Porte de Montmartre
61	Place d'Italie	Église de Pantin
62	Porte de France	Porte de Saint-Cloud
63	Gare de Lyon	Porte de la Muette
64	Porte des Lilas	Denfert-Rochereau
66	Opéra	Saint Ouen - Les Docks
67	Palais Royal–Musée du Louvre	Stade Charléty–Porte de Gentilly
68	Place de Clichy	Châtillon–Montrouge
69	Gambetta	Champ de Mars
70	Hôtel de Ville	Suresnes–De Gaulle
71	Porte de la Villette	Bibliothèque François Mitterrand
72	Gare de Lyon	Parc de Saint-Cloud
73	Musée d'Orsay	La Garenne-Colombes–Charlebourg (La Défense on end of evenings & on Sundays)
74	Châtelet	Clichy–Berges de Seine
75	Panthéon	Porte de Pantin
76	Châtelet	Bagnolet–Louise Michel
77	Gare de Lyon	Joinville-le-Pont
80	Jules Joffrin –Mairie du 18^{ème}	Porte de Versailles
82	Luxembourg	Neuilly-sur-Seine–Hôpital Américain
83	Porte d'Ivry	Invalides
84	Panthéon–Mairie du 5^{ème}	Levallois–Alsace
85	Châtelet	Saint-Ouen–Les Docks
86	Champ de Mars	Saint-Mandé–Demi-Lune–Parc Zoologique
87	Invalides (Jussieu –Minéraux additional shuttles at peak hours)	Porte de Reuilly
88	Porte d'Auteuil	Montsouris –Tombe Issoire
89	Porte de France	Gare de Vanves–Malakoff
91	Gare Montparnasse	Gare du Nord
92	Porte d'Orléans	Porte de Champerret
93	Invalides	Suresnes–De Gaulle
94	Gare Montparnasse	Pont de Levallois
95	Porte de Vanves	Porte de Montmartre
96	Gare Montparnasse	Porte des Lilas
PC	Porte d'Asnières –Marguerite Long	Pont du Garigliano–Hôpital Européen Georges-Pompidou

=== Suburban buses ===
Bus	Between	And
Routes 100–199
101	Joinville-le-Pont	Champigny–Camping International
102	Gambetta	Rosny–Bois-Perrier –Rosny 2
103	Ecole Vétérinaire de Maisons-Alfort	Thiais–Georges Halgoult
104	Ecole Vétérinaire de Maisons-Alfort	Sucy–Bonneuil
105	Porte des Lilas	Mairie des Pavillons-sous-Bois
106	Joinville-le-Pont	Villiers-sur-Marne–Le-Plessis-Trévise
107	Ecole Vétérinaire de Maisons-Alfort	Saint-Maur La Pie (Saint-Maur–Créteil on evenings & on Sundays)
108	Joinville-le-Pont	Champigny–Jeanne Vacher
109	Terroirs de France	Charenton–Liberté –Chanzy
110	Joinville-le-Pont	Villiers-sur-Marne–Le-Plessis-Trévise
111	Terroirs de France	Champigny–Saint-Maur (La Varenne–Chennevières on evenings & on Sundays)
112	Château de Vincennes	La Varenne–Chennevières
113	Nogent-sur-Marne	Mairie de Chelles (Chelles–Terre Ciel during the opening hours of the shopping center)
114	Château de Vincennes	Le Raincy–Villemomble–Montfermeil (Villemomble–Les Coquetiers on off-peak hours)
115	Porte des Lilas	Château de Vincennes
116	Rosny–Bois-Perrier –Rosny 2	Champigny–Saint-Maur
117	Créteil–Préfecture du Val-de-Marne	Champigny–Saint-Maur
118	Château de Vincennes	Rosny-sous-Bois–Van Der Heyden (Nanteuil–ZI Jules Ferry at peak hours)
119	Les Baconnets	Vauhallan–Abbaye–Cimetière (Massy–Palaiseau on evenings & on Sundays)
120	Nogent-sur-Marne	Noisy-le-Grand–Mont d'Est
121	Mairie de Montreuil	Château de Villemomble (Villemomble–Lycée Clémenceau at school hours)
122	Galliéni	Val de Fontenay
123	Porte d'Auteuil	Mairie d'Issy
124	Château de Vincennes	Val de Fontenay
125	Porte d'Orléans	Ecole Vétérinaire de Maisons-Alfort
126	Porte d'Orléans	Parc de Saint-Cloud
127	Croix de Chavaux	Neuilly-sur-Marne–Île-de-France (Neuilly-sur-Marne–Place de la Résistance on evenings)
128	Porte d'Orléans	Robinson
129	Romainville-Vassou	Mairie de Montreuil
131	Porte d'Italie	Rungis–La Fraternelle (Mairie de Chevilly-Larue–Théâtre on end of evenings)
132	Bibliothèque François-Mitterrand	Vitry-sur-Seine–Moulin Vert
133	Le Bourget	Gare de Sarcelles–Saint-Brice (Sarcelles–Bois d'Écouen at peak hours)
137	Porte de Clignancourt	Villeneuve-la-Garenne–Zone industrielle Nord
138	Gare de Saint-Ouen	Gare d'Ermont-Eaubonne (Les Barbanniers at peak hours & on Saturdays)
139	Porte de la Villette	Saint-Ouen–Quai de Seine (Carrefour Pleyel on Saturdays / La Plaine–Stade de France on Sundays)
140	Mairie de Saint-Ouen	Gare d'Argenteuil
141	La Défense	Lycée de Rueil-Malmaison
143	La Courneuve–Aubervilliers	Rosny-sous-Bois
144	La Défense	Rueil-Malmaison
145	Eglise de Pantin	Cimetière de Villemomble
146	Le Bourget	Montfermeil–Les Bosquets
147	Eglise de Pantin	Sevran–Avenue Ronsard
148	Bobigny–Pablo Picasso	Le Blanc-Mesnil–Musée de l'Air et de l'Espace
150	Porte de la Villette	Gare de Pierrefitte–Stains
151	Porte de Pantin	Bondy–Jouhaux-Blum
152	Porte de la Villette	Gonesse–ZAC des Tulipes Nord
153	Porte de la Chapelle	Stains–Moulin Neuf
157	Pont de Neuilly	Nanterre–Boulevard de la Seine
158	Pont de Neuilly	Rueil-Malmaison
159	La Défense	Nanterre–Cité du Vieux Pont
160	Nanterre–Préfecture	Pont de Saint-Cloud
162	Meudon–Val Fleury	Villejuif–Louis Aragon
163	Nanterre–Préfecture	Porte de Clichy
164	Porte de Champerret	Argenteuil–Collège Claude Monet
165	Porte de Champerret	Asnières–18 juin 1940
166	Porte de Clignancourt	Gennevilliers–Les Barbanniers (Gennevilliers–ZAC des Louvresses at peak hours)
167	Pont de Levallois	Colombes–Audra (Colombes–Piscine-Patinoire on week afternoons and on weekends)
168	Saint-Denis–Université	Sarcelles–Chantepie
169	Pont de Sèvres	Hôpital Européen Georges-Pompidou
170	Porte des Lilas	Gare de Saint-Denis
171	Pont de Sèvres	Château de Versailles (Gare de Chaville-Rive-Droite / Chaville-Rive-Gauche additional shuttles alternately at peak hours)
172	Bourg-la-Reine	Créteil–Hôpital Henri Mondor
173	Porte de Clichy	La Courneuve–8 Mai 1945
174	La Défense	Saint-Ouen
175	Porte de Saint-Cloud	Asnières–Gennevilliers–Gabriel Péri
176	Pont de Neuilly	Colombes–Petit Gennevilliers
177	Asnières–Gennevilliers–Gabriel Péri	Villeneuve-la-Garenne–Zone industrielle Nord
178	La Défense	Gennevilliers (Gennevilliers–Vieux Chemin de St-Denis–Centre commercial on weekends)
179	Pont de Sèvres	Robinson
180	Villejuif–Louis Aragon	Charenton–Écoles
181	Ecole Vétérinaire de Maisons-Alfort	Créteil–La Gaîté
182	Mairie d'Ivry	Villeneuve-Triage
183	Rungis–Marché International	Paris–Orly Airport (South Terminal)
184	Porte d'Italie	Fresnes–Pasteur
185	Porte d'Italie	Choisy–Sud
186	Porte d'Italie	Fresnes–Rond-Point Roosevelt
187	Porte d'Orléans	Fresnes–Les Groux
188	Porte d'Orléans	Bagneux–Rosenberg
189	Porte de Saint-Cloud	Clamart–Georges Pompidou
190	Mairie d'Issy	Église de Meudon-la-Forêt
191	Porte de Vanves	Clamart–Place du Garde
192	Robinson	Rungis–Marché International
193	Arcueil—Laplace	Mairie de l'Haÿ-les-Roses
194	Porte d'Orléans	Châtenay-Malabry–Lycée Polyvalent
195	Robinson	Châtillon-Montrouge (Clamart–Division Leclerc–Fosse Bazin on end of evenings)
196	Antony	Massy-Palaiseau
197	Porte d'Orléans	Massy–Opéra–Théâtre
199	Massy-Palaiseau	Longjumeau–La Rocade–Lycée (Saulx-les-Chartreux–Collège Pablo Picasso at school hours)
Routes 200–299
201	Porte Dorée	Champigny–Diderot–La Plage
202	Porte de Montreuil	Montreuil-Boissière-Acacia
203	Neuilly-Plaisance	Neuilly-sur-Marne–Île-de-France (Neuilly-sur-Marne–ZI Les Chanoux additional shuttles at peak hours)
206	Noisy-le-Grand–Mont d'Est	Le Plessis-Trévise–Place de Verdun
207	Noisy-le-Grand–Mont d'Est	Hôpital de La Queue-en-Brie
208a	Champigny–Saint-Maur	Champigny–Place de la Résistance
208b	Champigny–Saint-Maur	Le Plessis-Trévise–Place de Verdun (Champigny–Chennevières–Bois l'Abbé on Sundays)
208s	Champigny–Saint-Maur	Champigny–Chennevières–Bois l'Abbé (circular line replacing lines 208a & 208b during evenings)
209	Villiers-sur-Marne–Le Plessis-Trévise	Pontault-Combault — Place de Beilstein (Émerainville–Pontault-Combault)
210	Château de Vincennes	Villiers-sur-Marne–Le Plessis-Trévise
211	Torcy	Gare de Vaires–Torcy (Chelles–Terre Ciel during the opening hours of the shopping center)
212	Noisy–Champs –Descartes	Émerainville–Pontault-Combault
213	Chelles–Gournay	Lognes–Le Village (Noisy–Champs on Sundays)
214	Neuilly–Plaisance	Gagny–Roger Salengro
215	Gare d'Austerlitz	Vincennes
216	Paris–Denfert-Rochereau	Rungis–Marché International
217	Vitry-sur-Seine	Hôtel de Ville de Créteil
220	Bry-sur-Marne	Torcy
221	Bagnolet–Gallieni	Gagny–Pointe de Gournay
234	Fort d'Aubervilliers	Mairie de Livry-Gargan
235	Asnières–Gennevilliers–Gabriel Péri	Colombes–Europe
237	Porte de Saint-Ouen Hôpital Biachat	Épinay-sur-Seine
238	Pont de Levallois (Asnières–Gennevilliers–Les Courtilles at peak hours)	Gennevilliers–ZAC des Louvresses (Port de Gennevilliers–Centre de Vie on weekends) (Saint-Gratien additional shuttles at peak hours)
239	Rosa-Parks –Curial	Basilique de Saint-Denis –Médiathèque
241	Porte d'Auteuil	Rueil-Malmaison
244	Porte Maillot	Rueil-Malmaison
245	Eglise de Pantin	Gare de Rosny-Bois-Perrier
247	Aulnay-sous-Bois–Garonor	Drancy–Stade Charles Sage
248	Fort d'Aubervilliers	Drancy
249	Porte des Lilas	Dugny–Place Valérie André
250	Fort d'Aubervilliers	Gonesse–La Fontaine Cypière–ZI
251	Bobigny–Pablo Picasso (Bobigny–Benoît Frachon at peak hours)	Aulnay-sous-Bois
252	Porte de la Chapelle	Garges–Sarcelles
253	La Courneuve–Aubervilliers	Stains–Moulin Neuf
254	Gare de Saint-Denis	Gare d'Enghien-les-Bains
255	Porte de Clignancourt	Stains–Les Prévoyants (Garges–Rond-point de la Lutèce three times a day)
256	Saint-Denis–Université	Gare d'Enghien-les-Bains
258	La Défense	Rueil-Malmaison–La Jonchère
259	Nanterre–Anatole France	Saint-Germain-en-Laye
260	Suzanne Lenglen –Balard	Boulogne–Gambetta
261	Gare de Franconville	Villeneuve-la-Garenne–Bongarde
262	Pont de Bezons	Gare de Maisons-Laffitte
263	Nanterre–Place de la Boule	Suresnes–le Val d'Or
268	Saint-Denis–Université	Villiers-le-Bel–Gonesse–Arnouville
269	Garges–Sarcelles	Hôtel de Ville d'Attainville (Ézanville–Les Bourguignons–Rû de Vaux on Sundays)
270	Villiers-le-Bel–Gonesse–Arnouville	Stains–La Cerisaie
272	Sartrouville	Gare d'Argenteuil
274	Porte des Ternes	Gare de Saint-Denis
275	La Défense	Pont de Levallois
276	La Défense	Asnières–Gennevilliers–Les Courtilles
277	Nanterre – Anatole France	Asnières – Bords de Seine
278	La Défense	Bois-Colombes–Les Bruyères
281	Joinville-le-Pont	Créteil–Europarc
285	Athis-Mons–Porte de l'Essonne	Marché de Juvisy (Juvisy until recent works on station surroundings)
286	Villejuif–Louis Aragon	Antony
289	Porte de Saint-Cloud	Clamart–Georges Pompidou
290	Issy–Val de Seine	Le Plessis-Robinson–La Boursidière
291	Pont de Sèvres	Vélizy-Villacoublay–La Cheminée (Vélizy 2 on Saturdays)
292	Athis-Mons–Porte de l'Essonne	Savigny-sur-Orge–ZAC Les Gâtines–Capitaine Jean d'Hers
294	Châtillon-Montrouge	Igny (Mairie d'Igny on evenings & on Sundays)
297	Longjumeau–Place Charles Steber	Antony (Porte d'Orléans on evenings)
299	Porte d'Orléans	Morangis–Place Lucien Boileau
Routes 300–399
301	Bobigny–Pablo Picasso	Val de Fontenay
302	Paris–Gare du Nord	La Courneuve–6 Routes
303	Bobigny–Pablo Picasso	Noisy-le-Grand–Mont d'Est
304	Nanterre–Place de la Boule	Asnières–Gennevilliers–Les Courtilles
306	Saint-Maur–Créteil	Noisy-le-Grand–Mont d'Est
308	Créteil–Préfecture du Val de Marne	Villiers-sur-Marne–Le-Plessis-Trévise
310	Noisy–Champs	Les Yvris Noisy-le-Grand
311	Noisiel	Chelles - Terre Ciel via Gare de Vaires - Torcy
312	Noisy–Champs –Descartes	Mairie de Champs (inner & outer circular lines)
317	Hôtel de Ville de Créteil	Nogent-Le Perreux (Le Parc de Saint-Maur on Sundays)
318	Château de Vincennes	Bobigny–Pantin–Raymond Queneau
319	Massy-Palaiseau	Rungis–Marché International
320	Noisy-le-Grand–Mont d'Est	Noisy–Champs (inner & outer circular lines)
321	Lognes (Croissy-Beaubourg–Z.I. Pariest on weekends)	Torcy (Aérodrome de Lognes additional shuttles at peak hours)
322	Mairie de Montreuil	Bobigny–Pablo Picasso
323	Issy–Val de Seine	Ivry-sur-Seine–Gambetta
325	Quai de la Gare	Château de Vincennes
330	Fort d'Aubervilliers	Pantin–Raymond Queneau
337	Deuil-la-Barre–Zone artisanale du Moutier	Pierrefite-Stains
340	Gare d'Argenteuil (Asnières–Gennevilliers–Gabriel Péri on weekends)	Clichy–Berges de Seine (Clichy–Hôpital Beaujon on weekends)
341	Paris–Charles de Gaulle–Étoile	Porte de Clignancourt
346	Rosny–Bois-Perrier –Rosny 2 (Bondy on Sundays)	Le Blanc-Mesnil–Place de la Libération
350	Paris–Porte de la Chapelle	Paris–Charles de Gaulle (CDG) Airport (Cargo, All Terminals & Roissypole)
351	Paris–Nation	Paris–Charles de Gaulle (CDG) Airport (Cargo, All Terminals & Roissypole)
353	Saint Denis–Université	Saint-Denis–ZAC Landy-Nord
355	Sarcelles–Lycée Jean-Jacques Rousseau	Sarcelles–Les Chardonnerettes (circular line)
356	Saint-Denis–Cité Floréal	Deuil-la-Barre–Marché des Mortefontaines
360	La Défense	Hôpital de Garches
361	Pierrefitte-Stains	Gare d'Argenteuil
363	Nanterre–Préfecture RER	Bois-Colombes – Les Bruyères
366	Église de Colombes	Asnières–Bords de Seine
367	Pont de Bezons	Rueil-Malmaison
368	Garges–Sarcelles	Sarcelles–Place du Souvenir Français
370	Villiers-le-Bel–Gonesse–Arnouville	Marché de Saint-Brice
372	Maisons-Alfort-Alfortville	Maisons-Alfort–Louis Fliche
378	Nanterre-Ville	Asnières–Gennevilliers–Les Courtilles
380	Arcueil–Vache Noire–Centre Commercial	Villejuif–Louis Aragon
382	Gare de Thiais - Orly	Les Ardoines RER
385	Marché de Juvisy	Épinay-sur-Orge (Savigny-sur-Orge–Toulouse-Lautrec at peak hours and on Sundays)
388	Porte d'Orléans	Bourg-la-Reine
389	Hôtel de Ville de Boulogne-Billancourt	Clamart–Georges Pompidou
390	Bourg-la-Reine	Vélizy–Europe Sud
391	Gare de Vanves–Malakoff	Bagneux –Pont Royal
393	Thiais–Carrefour de la Résistance	Sucy-Bonneuil
394	Issy–Val de Seine	Bourg-la-Reine
395	Antony	Le Plessis-Robinson–Pavé Blanc
396	La Croix de Berny	Rungis–Marché International
399	Massy–Palaiseau	Marché de Juvisy
Routes 400–499
421	Gare de Vaires–Torcy	Émerainville–Pontault-Combault
426	Pont de Sèvres	Gare de La Celle-Saint-Cloud
459	Gare de Saint-Cloud	Rueil-Malmaison–Henri Regnault
467	Pont de Sèvres	Rueil-Malmaison
471	Saint-Cloud–Les Côteaux	Gare de Versailles–Rive Droite
485	Athis-Mons–Noyer-Renard	Athis-Mons–Delalande-Pasteur
486	Marché de Juvisy	Athis-Mons–Porte de l'Essonne
487	Marché de Juvisy	Athis-Mons–Porte de l'Essonne
488	Marché de Juvisy	Athis-Mons–Place Henri Deudon
492	Savigny-sur-Orge–Prés Saint-Martin	Chilly-Mazarin–Place de la Libération

=== Night buses (Noctilien) ===
Bus	Between	And
N01	Gare de l'Est	Gare de l'Est (Inner circle line–clockwise)
N02	Gare Montparnasse	Gare Montparnasse (Outer circle line–counterclockwise)
N11	Pont de Neuilly	Château de Vincennes
N12	Pont de Sèvres	Romainville–Carnot
N13	Mairie d'Issy	Bobigny–Pablo Picasso
N14	Mairie de Saint-Ouen	La Croix de Berny
N15	Asnières−Gennevilliers–Gabriel Péri	Villejuif–Louis Aragon
N16	Pont de Levallois	Mairie de Montreuil
N21	Châtelet	Longjumeau–Hôpital
N22	Châtelet	Juvisy
N23	Châtelet	Chelles–Gournay
N24	Châtelet	Sartrouville
N31	Gare de Lyon	Paris Orly Airport (South Terminal)
N32	Gare de Lyon	Boissy-Saint-Léger
N33	Gare de Lyon	Villiers-sur-Marne (via Vincennes & Nogent-sur-Marne)
N34	Gare de Lyon	Torcy
N35	Gare de Lyon	Villiers-sur-Marne (via Maisons-Alfort & Saint-Maur-des-Fossés)
N41	Gare de l'Est	Villeparisis–Mitry-le-Neuf
N42	Gare de l'Est	Aulnay-sous-Bois–Garonor
N43	Gare de l'Est	Gare de Sarcelles–Saint-Brice
N44	Gare de l'Est	Garges–Sarcelles
N45	Gare de l'Est	Montfermeil–Hôpital
N51	Gare Saint-Lazare	Gare d'Enghien
N52	Gare Saint-Lazare	Gare de Cormeilles-en-Parisis
N53	Gare Saint-Lazare	Nanterre–Anatole France
N61	Gare Montparnasse	Clamart–Georges Pompidou
N62	Gare Montparnasse	Rungis International Market
N63	Gare Montparnasse	Massy-Palaiseau
N66	Gare Montparnasse	Gare de Chaville-Rive-Droite
N71	Rungis International Market	Val de Fontenay
N122	Châtelet	Saint-Rémy-lès-Chevreuse
N153	Gare Saint-Lazare	Saint Germain-en-Laye

=== Special and circular bus lines ===
==== Circular bus lines in Paris ====
Bus	Between	And
501 (La Traverse de Charonne)	Gambetta	Lagny-Maraîchers
513 (La Traverse Bièvre-Montsouris)	Place de l'Abbé Georges Hénocque	Alésia –Général Leclerc
518 (La Traverse Batignolles-Bichat)	Hôpital Bichat	Pont Cardinet
519 (La Traverse Ney-Flandre)	Porte d'Aubervilliers –Oberlé	Place de la Chapelle

==== Special and circular bus lines in suburbs ====
Bus	Between	And	Notes
Tvm	Saint-Maur–Créteil	La Croix de Berny	
515 ( tillBus )	Les Lilas–Place du Vel' d'Hiv'	Mairie des Lilas	circular line
520 (la Navette de Bry-sur-Marne)	Les Boullereaux–Champigny	Villiers-sur-Marne–Les Hauts de Bry (SFP Studios)	
537 L'Audonienne	Saint-Ouen–Payret	Saint-Ouen–Debain	
538 bus du port (Port de Gennevilliers)	538r Gare du Stade; 538g Asnières–Gennevilliers–Les Courtilles; 538b Asnières–Gennevilliers–Les Courtilles	538r Logistique; 538g Port Pétrolier; 538b Logistique	
541-1 Buséolien 1	Puteaux–Cimetière Nouveau	Île de Puteaux	
541-2 Buséolien 2	Puteaux–Cimetière Nouveau	Conservatoire Pressensé	
544a 544b Autobus Suresnois	544b Suresnes–De Gaulle	544a Place de Stalingrad; 544b Suresnes–Cimetière Voltaire	circular lines
546 TUB	Bondy–La Mare à la Veuve	Bondy–Les Coquetiers	circular line
559 (Ligne Bleue)	Nanterre–Chemin de L'Île	Nanterre–Cimetière du Mont Valérien	
564	Collège La Malmaison	Église de Rueil	circular line
565	Mairie de Rueil	Hauts de Rueil–Église de Buzenval	
573 p'tit bus	Hoche	Mairie des Lilas	circular line
577 ( RiverPlaza )	Asnières–Gennevilliers–Gabriel Péri	Gennevilliers	
595	Robinson	Le Plessis-Robinson–La Boursidière	

==== Valouette routes ====
Bus	Between	And	Notes
v2	Fresnes–Pasteur	Chevilly-Larue–Domaine Chérioux	
v3	Cachan–Centre-ville	Bagneux	circular line
v4	Arcueil–Hôtel de Ville	Arcueil-Cachan	circular line
v5	Gentilly–Gabriel Péri–Soleil Levant	Gentilly	circular line
v6	Le Kremlin-Bicêtre–Leclerc–Thomas	Hôpital du Kremlin-Bicêtre	circular line
v7	Villejuif–Louis Aragon	Mairie de Villejuif	circular line
