= XLG =

XLG or Xlg may refer to:

- xlg, the ISO 639-3 code for Ligurian (ancient language)
- Lognes–Émerainville aerodrome, the IATA code XLG
