= Pont de Sèvres =

Bridge over the Seine in France

Coordinates: 48.8285°N 2.2270°E

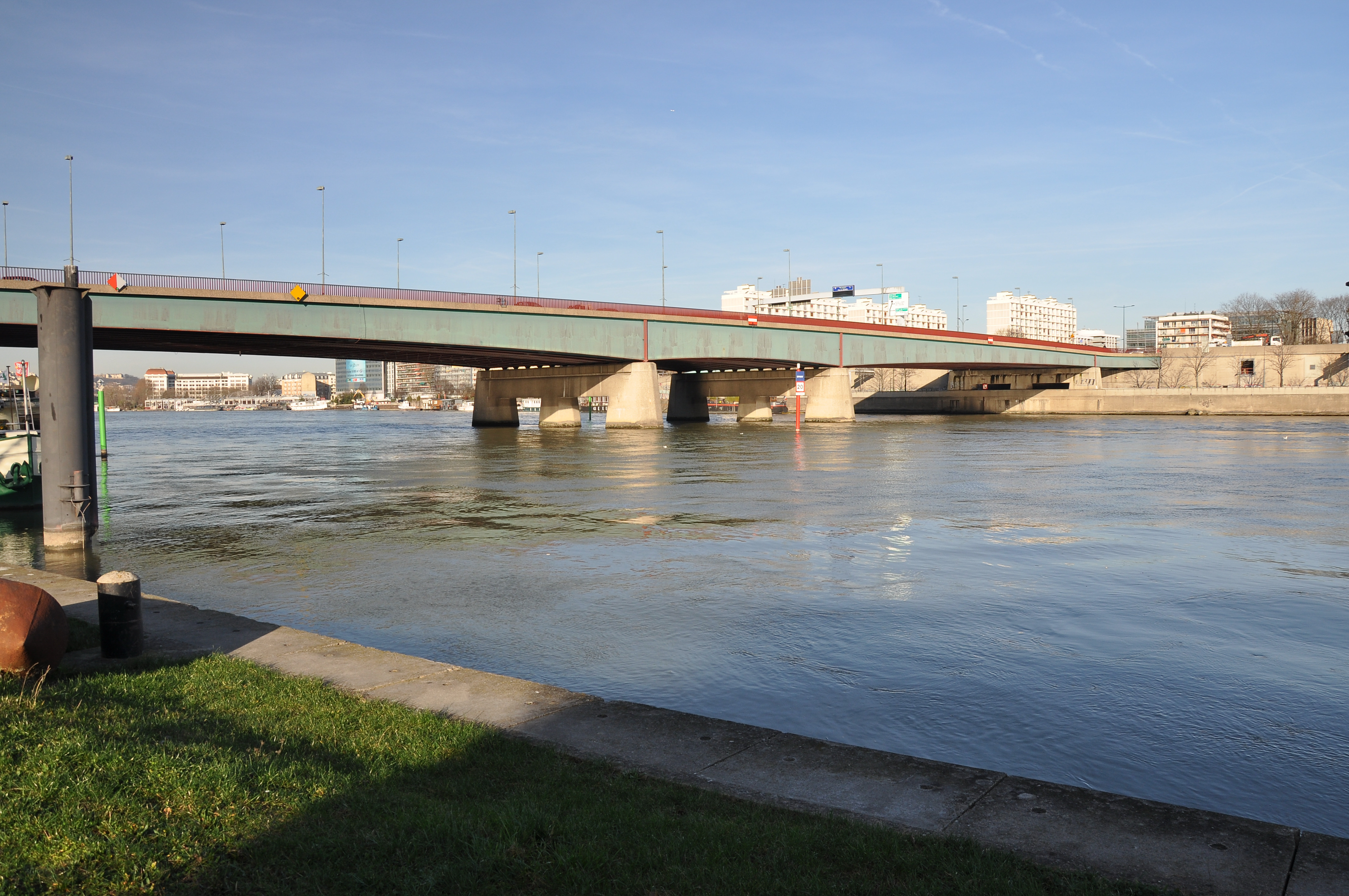
View of the Pont de Sèvres in January 2012

The Pont de Sèvres (French: [pɔ̃ d(ə) sɛvʁ]; Bridge of Sèvres) is a bridge over the Seine which links the cities of Boulogne-Billancourt and Sèvres, in the southwestern inner suburbs of Paris, France. The current bridge was put in service in 1963.

The bridge is also above the RD 1 and RD 7 roads, and Île-de-France tramway Line 2. The nearby Pont de Sèvres station, the western terminus of Paris Métro Line 9, was named after it.
