= Rungis International Market =

Food market in France

Coordinates: 48°45′35″N 2°21′13″E

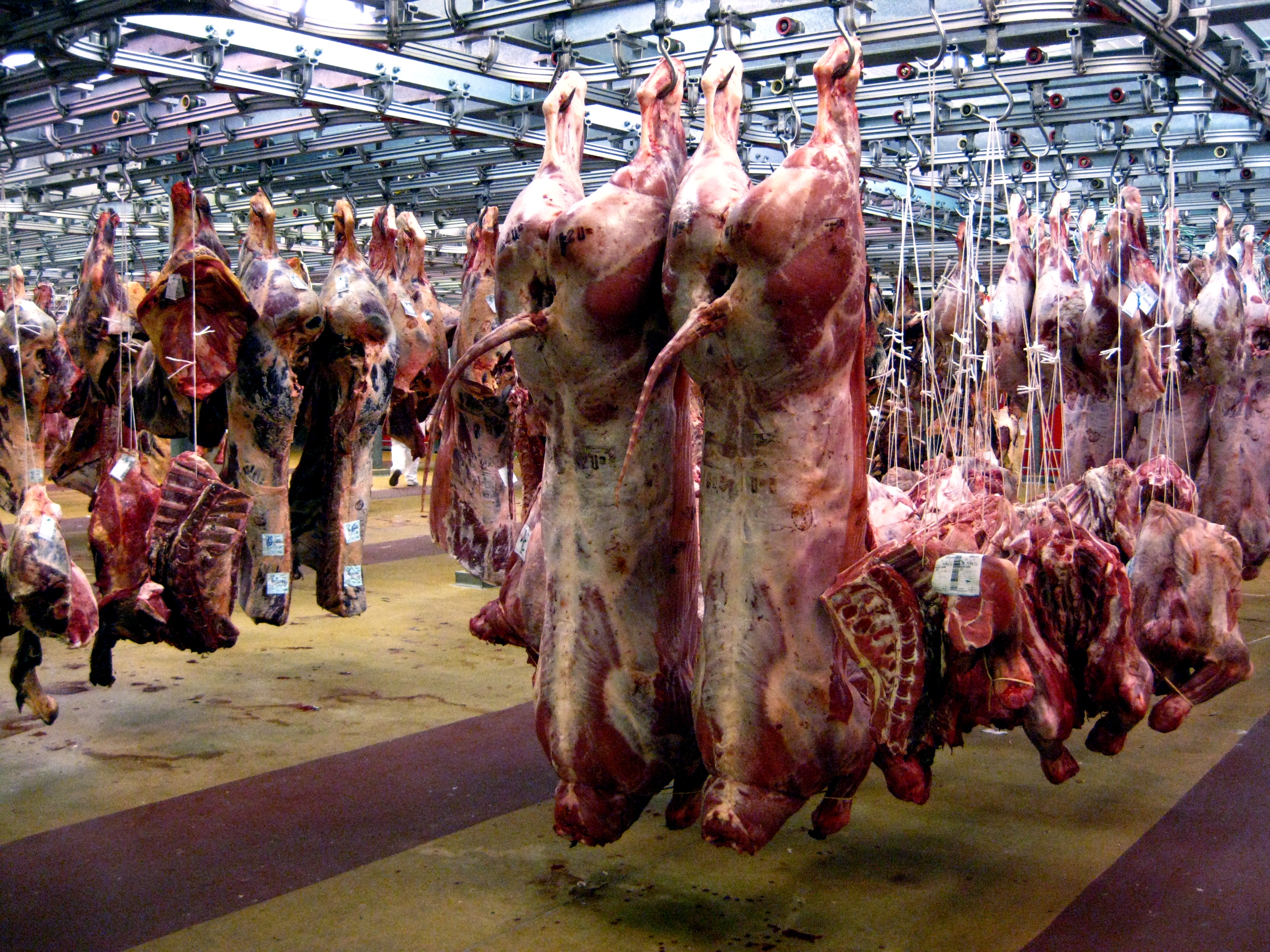
The meat sector of the Rungis wholesale market

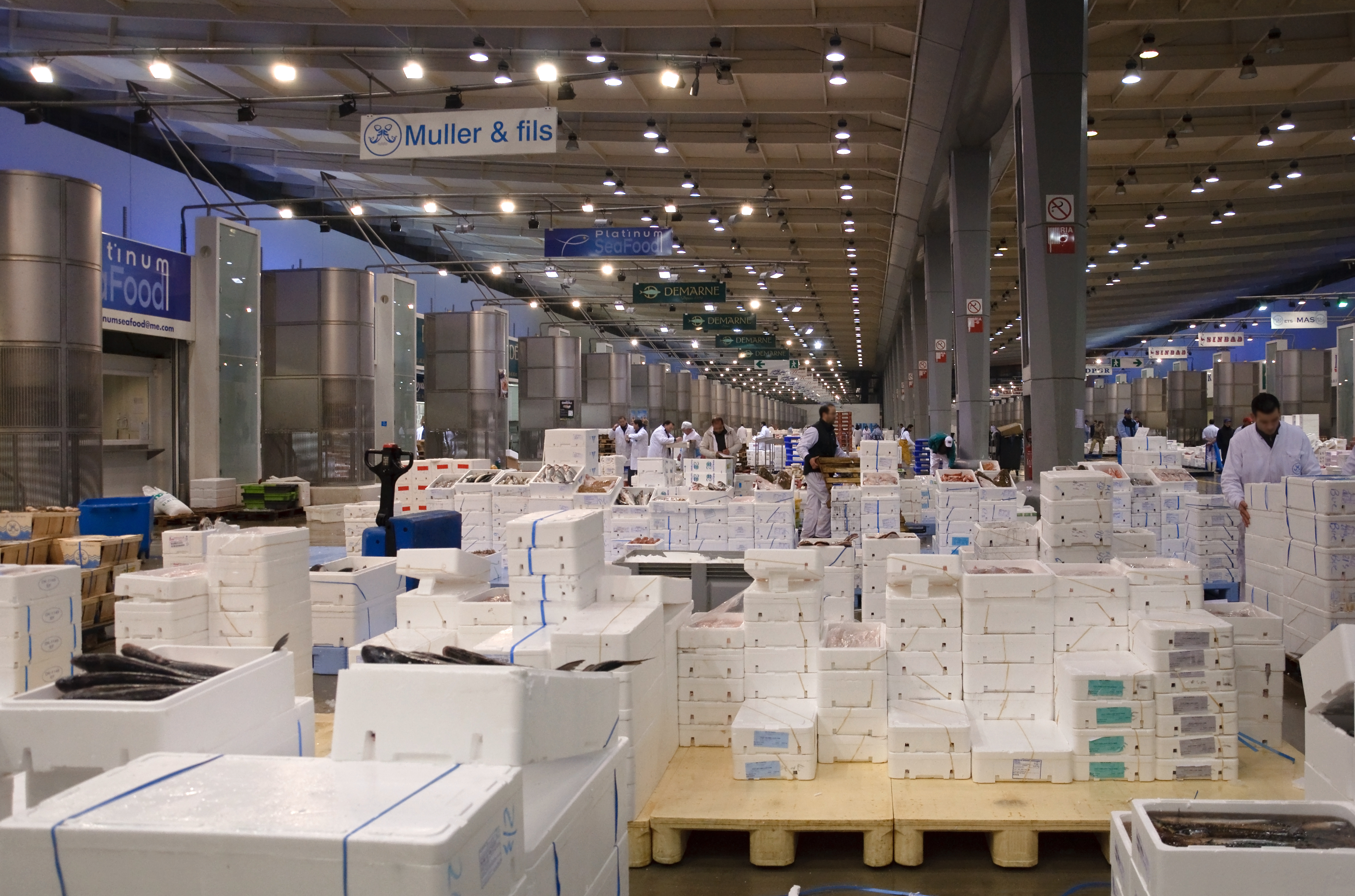
The fresh fish and seafood pavilion in Rungis

The Rungis International Market (French: Marché International de Rungis, pronounced [maʁʃe ɛ̃tɛʁnɑsjɔnal də ʁœ̃ʒis]) is the principal wholesale market of Paris and mainly deals in food and horticultural products. It is located in the commune of Rungis, in the southern suburbs. With an area of 232 hectares (570 acres), it is the second largest wholesale food market in the world (after Central de Abasto in Mexico City, which have an area of 327 hectares (810 acres)).

== History ==
From its origins in the 10th century to the mid-20th century, the central market of Paris was located in the centre of the city, in a 10-hectare (25-acre) area named Les Halles. That became too small to accommodate all of the business demand, and, in 1969, the market was transferred to the suburbs. Rungis was selected because of its easy access by rail and highway and its proximity to Orly International Airport.

On 25 September 2022, the market caught fire.

== Ownership ==
The market is the property of the French State and administered by the Semmaris (Société d'Économie Mixte d'Aménagement et de gestion du marché d'intérêt national de Rungis).

== Statistics ==
- the complex covers 232 hectares (570 acres) and is slightly larger than the Principality of Monaco;
- 13,000 people work there every day;
- 26,000 vehicles enter every day (of which 3,000 are heavy trucks);
- 1,698,000 tonnes of products are brought in annually;
- it has the largest turnover of wholesale markets in the world.
