= Lognes–Émerainville Aerodrome =

Lognes–Émerainville aerodrome Aérodrome de Lognes - Émerainville
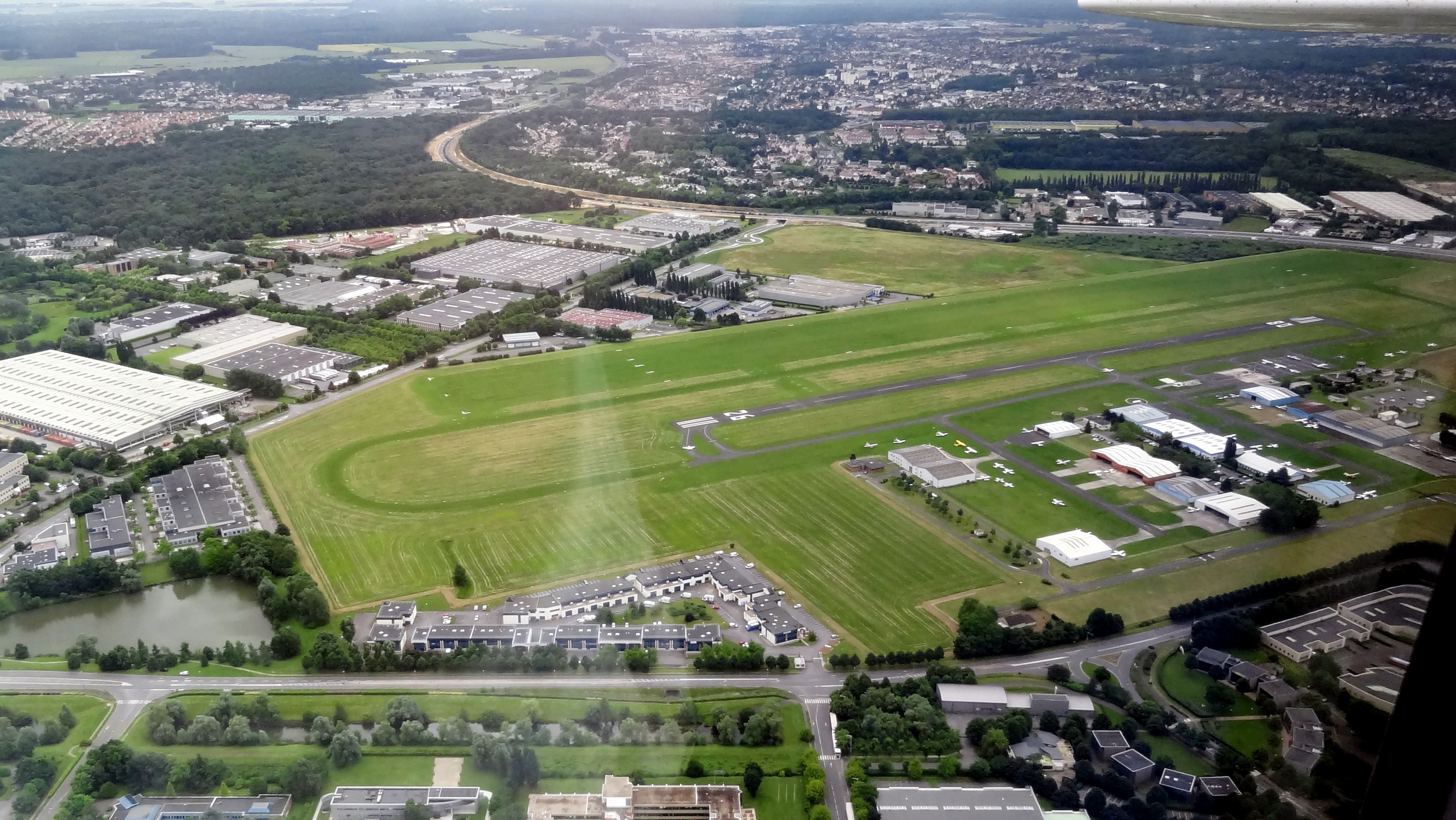
- IATA: XLG; ICAO: LFPL

Summary
- Airport type: Public
- Operator: Aéroports de Paris
- Serves: Lognes, France
- Built: 1947
- Elevation AMSL: 359 ft (109 m)
- Coordinates: 48°49′19″N 002°37′22″E

Map
- Location of Lognes–Emerainville aerodrome

Runways
Direction	Length		Surface
Direction	m	ft	Surface
26/08 paved	700	2,297	Asphalt
26/08 unpaved	1,100	3,609	Grass
- Information from the French aviation authority.

Lognes–Émerainville aerodrome (French: aérodrome de Lognes–Émerainville) (ICAO : LFPL, IATA: XLG) is an aerodrome serving Lognes, in France. It is located 28 km east of Paris and 1.5 km south of Lognes. It is located along A4 autoroute and Francilienne highways.

== Traffic ==
The airfield is open to light aviation under visual flight rules and to international traffic (upon request). In 2014, Lognes aerodrome handled 80,568 aircraft movements, and is today the second busiest airport in France in terms of movements (after Toussus le Noble airport). Traffic at Lognes mainly consists of general aviation (tourism, flight schools and helicopters).

== Facilities ==
The aerodrome is located at an elevation of 359 feet above mean sea level. It has one paved runway (26/08 paved) which measures 700 × 20 meters, and one unpaved runway (26/08 unpaved) which measures 1,100 × 100 meters.

The aerodrome hosts 10 flight clubs (aeroclubs):

- Henri Guillaumet aeroclub
- Plane Air aeroclub
- Aigle de Saint Maur aeroclub
- Les Aiglons aeroclub
- La Brie aeroclub
- Sadi Lecointe aeroclub
- Paris Est aeroclub
- Lognes aeroclub
- Fly Academy flight school
- Aeroflight flight school

== Transportation ==
Lognes aerodrome is served by RATP bus 321 which goes to Lognes train station and by Seine-et-Marne express bus service to Meaux and Melun.
