= Versailles rail accident =

1842 train wreck in France

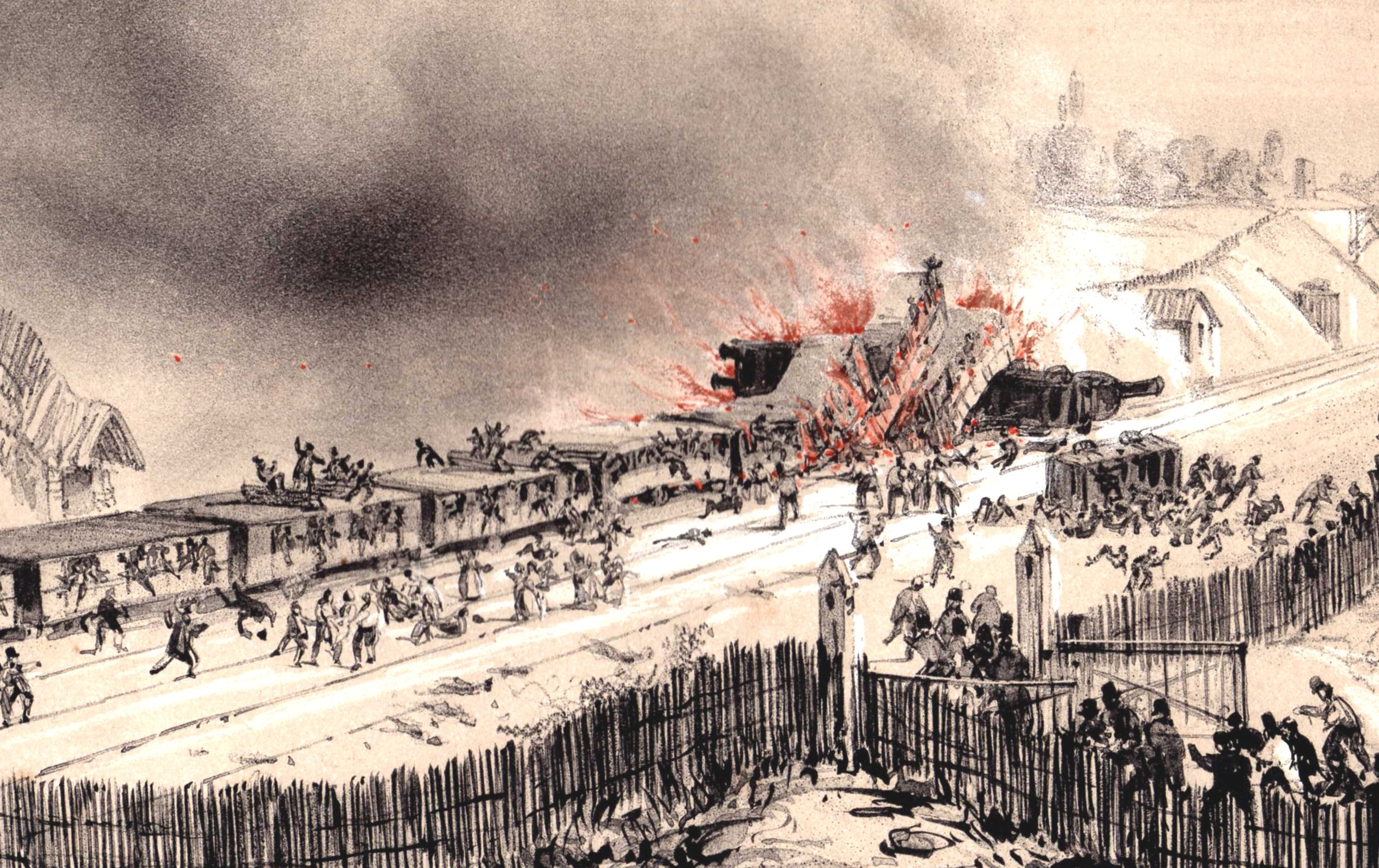
- 1842 sketch of the derailment and fire

Details
- Date: 8 May 1842
- Location: Meudon, Paris
- Coordinates: 48°49′06″N 02°13′52″E
- Country: France
- Cause: Broken axle

Statistics
- Trains: 1
- Deaths: 52–200
- Injured: Hundreds

On 8 May 1842, a train crashed in the cutting between Meudon and Bellevue stations on the railway between Versailles and Paris, France. The train was travelling to Paris when it derailed after the leading locomotive broke an axle, and the carriages behind piled into it and caught fire. It was the first French railway disaster and the deadliest in the world at the time, causing between 52 and 200 deaths, including that of explorer Jules Dumont d'Urville. The derailment led the French to abandon the practice of locking passengers in their carriages.

Metal fatigue was poorly understood at the time and the disaster led to systematic research into the problem.

== Derailment and fire ==
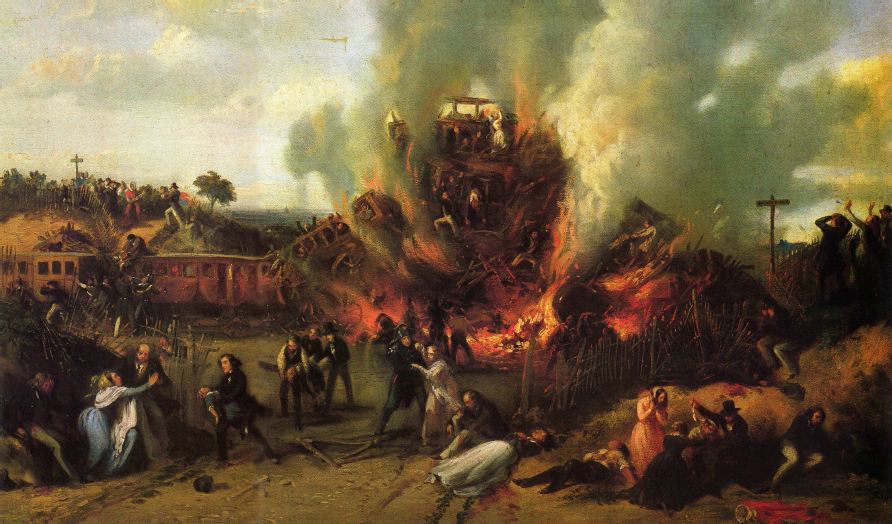
A painting of the disaster

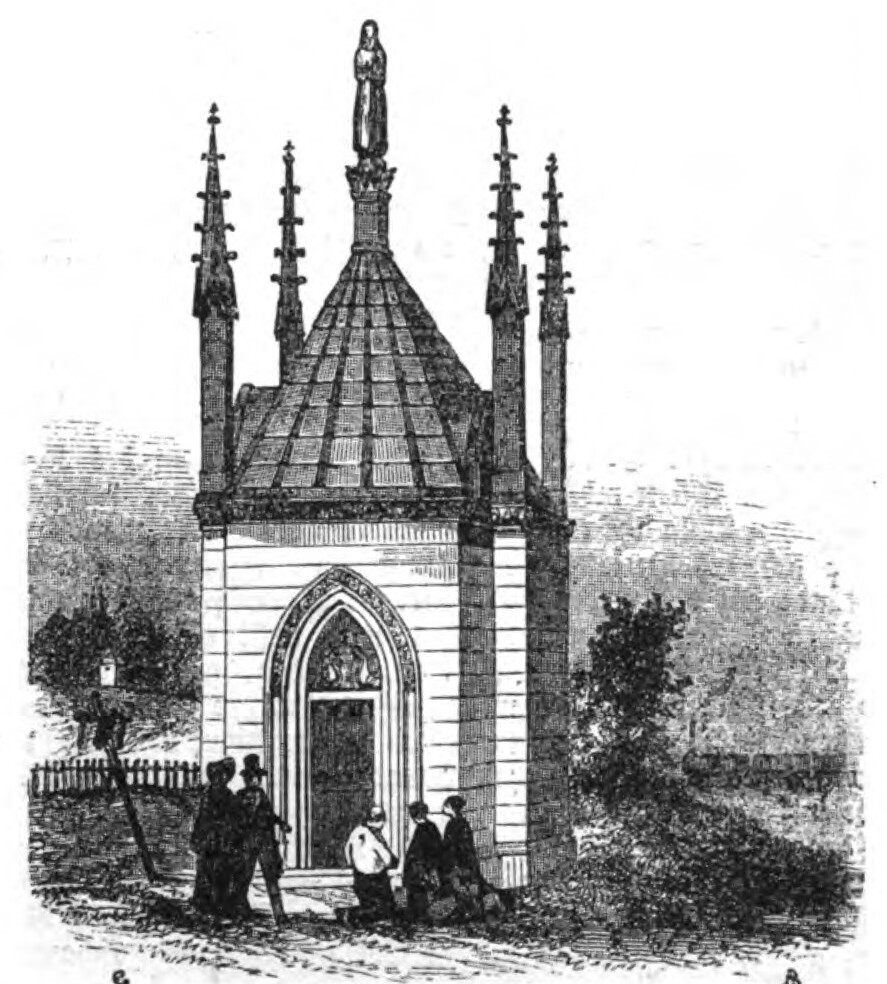
1849 illustration of the Notre-Dame-des-Flammes chapel

By the late afternoon of Sunday 8 May 1842, the public celebrations being held in honour of king Louis Philippe I's saint's day in the Gardens of Versailles had finished and many people wished to return to Paris. At 5:30 pm a train left the Rive Gauche (Note: There are railway lines along both banks of the River Seine from Versailles into Paris. The Rive Gauche station is the one on the left (south) bank line.) Versailles railway station for Paris Montparnasse. Over 120 metres (390 ft) long and composed of 16 to 18 carriages hauled by two steam locomotives, the train was crowded, carrying 770 passengers. Travelling at 40 kilometres per hour (25 mph) between Bellevue and Meudon, one of the axles of the leading locomotive snapped and the vehicle derailed, scattering the contents of its fire-box. When the second locomotive and the carriages continued over the derailed locomotive, the carriages caught fire, trapping the passengers. The passengers were locked in their compartments as was the custom in continental Europe at the time.

The fire was so intense that the number of fatalities could not be determined, with estimates varying between 52 and 200, and hundreds of people were seriously injured. Among the deaths was the explorer Jules Dumont d'Urville and his family; his remains were identified by a sculptor from a cast he had made of the skull.

Some religious groups said the passengers had been punished for travelling on a Sunday.

A chapel named "Notre-Dame-des-Flammes" (English: Our Lady of the Flames) was built in Meudon in memory of the victims by architect François-Marie Lemarié who had lost relatives himself; this was listed as a monument historique in 1938, but delisted in 1959 and demolished soon after.

== Legacy ==
The accident was the worst rail disaster in the world at the time. The derailment led to the abandonment of the practice of locking passengers in their carriages in France. The French government appointed a commission to investigate the derailment; this recommended testing axles to determine their service life and monitoring their usage so that they could be replaced after travelling a safe distance.

Metal fatigue was poorly understood at the time and the derailment is linked to the beginnings of systematic research into the problem. Work by H. H. Edwards, William Rankine, William Fairbairn and others described the fatigue process and Rankine developed a solution for railway axles. Later, during 1856 to 1870, the work of August Wöhler would help to improve testing of axles, and so increase axle life.

== See also ==
- Meudon Viaduct

== Sources ==
- George Sendeckiyj (2006). "Early Railroad Accidents and the Origins of research on fatigue of metals", Appendix A of Theodore Nicholas (2006). High Cycle Fatigue: A Mechanics of Materials Perspective. Elsevier. ISBN 978-0-08-044691-2.
