= Vanves–Malakoff station =

Railway station in Vanves, France

Vanves–Malakoff
- Exterior, in February 2026

General information
- Location: Vanves, Hauts-de-Seine, Île-de-France, France
- Coordinates: 48°49′05″N 2°17′30″E
- Line: Paris–Brest railway
- Platforms: 2
- Tracks: 4

Other information
- Station code: 87391532
- Fare zone: 2

History
- Opened: 1 October 1883

Passengers
- 2024: 1,611,090

Services
Preceding station	Transilien	Following station
Paris-Montparnasse Terminus	Line N	Clamart towards Dreux, Mantes-la-Jolie or Rambouillet
Location

Vanves–Malakoff is a railway station in Vanves, Hauts-de-Seine, Paris, France. The station was opened in 1883 and is located on the Paris–Brest railway. The train services are operated by SNCF.

Just north of the station is the start of the LGV Atlantique high-speed line to the west and south-west of France, used by TGV trains.

== Train services ==
The following services call at Vanves–Malakoff:

- Regional services (Transilien) Paris–Versailles–St-Quentin-en-Yvelines–Rambouillet
- Regional services (Transilien) Paris–Versailles–Plaisir
- Regional services (Transilien) Paris–Versailles–Plaisir–Mantes-la-Jolie
