= Clamart station =

Railway station in Clamart, Paris, France

Clamart
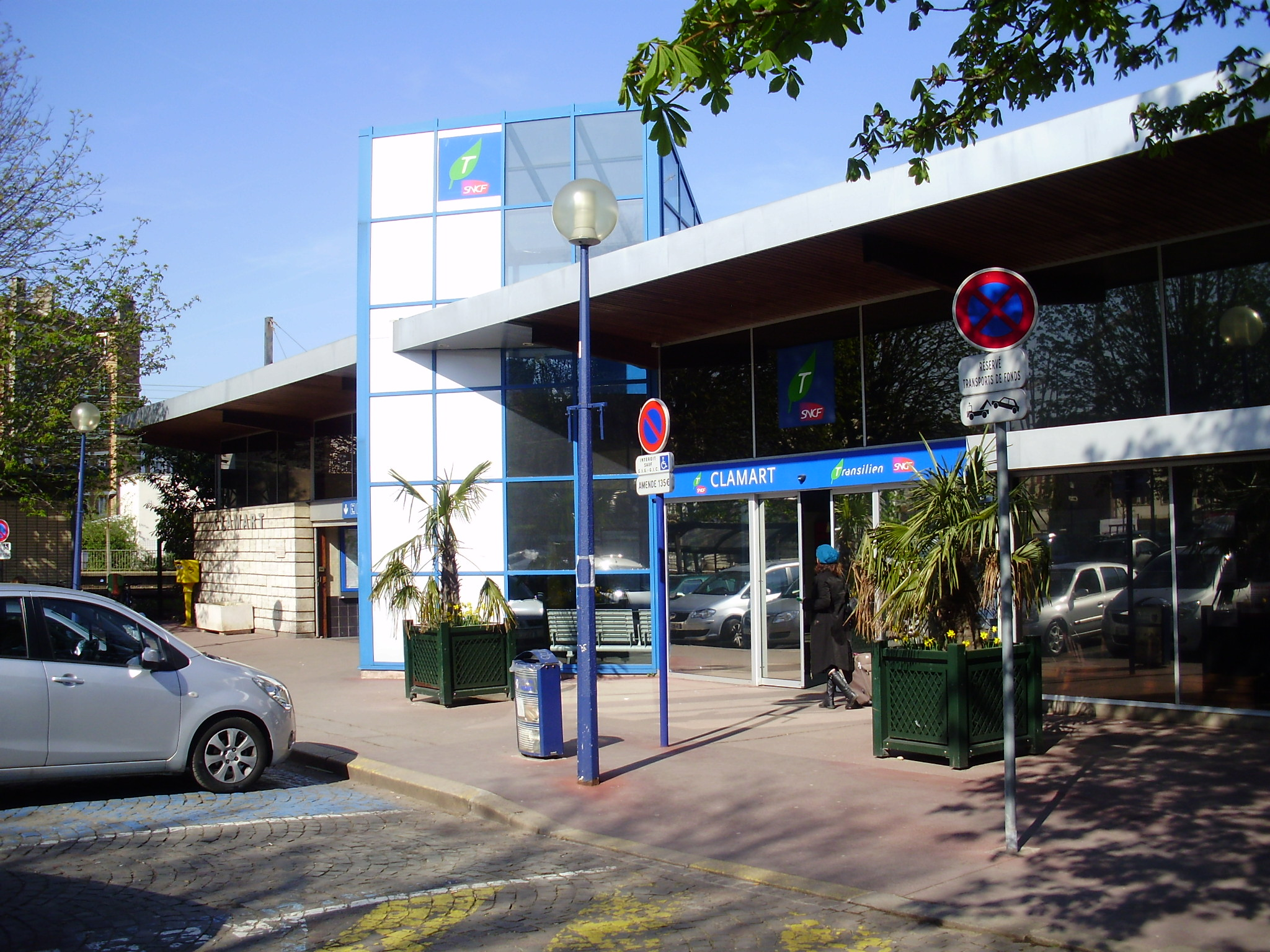
- Clamart station entrance

General information
- Location: Place de la Gare; Clamart; France
- Coordinates: 48°48′50″N 2°16′23″E
- Operator: Line N: SNCF; Line 15: ORA (RATP Dev, Alstom & ComfortDelGro)
- Platforms: Line N: 1 island platform; Line 15: 2 side platforms
- Tracks: Line N: 4; Line 15: 2

Construction
- Structure type: Line N: At-grade; Line 15: Underground
- Depth: Line 15: 26 m (85 ft)
- Accessible: Line N: No; Line 15: Yes
- Architect: Line 15: Philippe Gazeau

Other information
- Station code: Line N: 87391565; Line 15: GA21 / 21FVC
- Fare zone: 2

Passengers
- 2024: 2,464,698

Services
Preceding station	Transilien	Following station
Vanves–Malakoff towards Paris-Montparnasse	Line N	Meudon towards Dreux, Mantes-la-Jolie or Rambouillet

Future services
Preceding station	Paris Metro	Following station
Issy towards Pont de Sèvres	Line 15 (autumn 2027)	Châtillon–Montrouge towards Noisy–Champs
Location

Clamart (French pronunciation: [klamaʁ]) is a railway station in Clamart, a southwestern suburb of Paris, France. It is situated on the Paris–Brest railway. It is served by Transilien trains from Paris-Montparnasse to Rambouillet, Dreux and Mantes-la-Jolie.

In the future, Clamart will be a station on Line 15 of the Paris Metro; the station is part of the Grand Paris Express project. The station will open as part of Line 15 South in autumn 2027.
