= Bellevue funicular =

Bellevue funicular Funiculaire de Bellevue
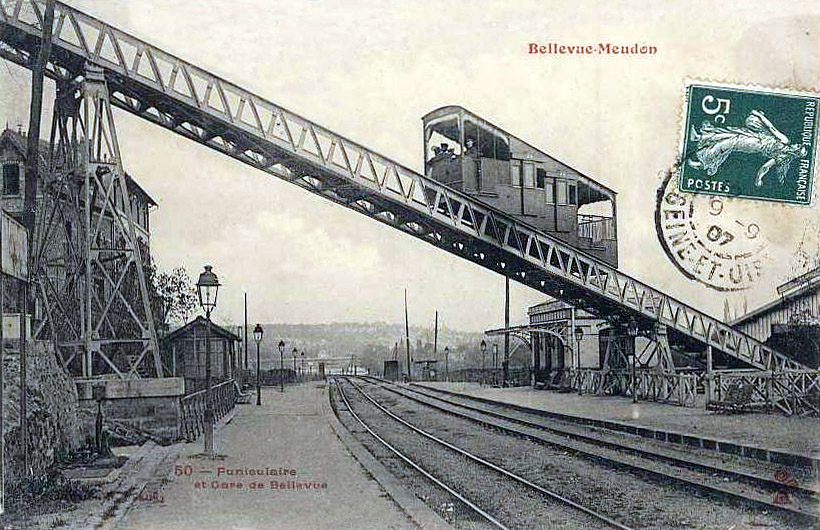
- The funicular and station around 1900. Today it is the Brimborion station on Paris Tramway Line 2

Overview
- Status: Demolished
- Locale: Meudon, Hauts-de-Seine
- Termini: Bellevue-Funiculaire; Gare de Bellevue

Service
- Type: Funicular
- Rolling stock: Two bespoke cars
- Ridership: 266,662 (1895); 171,126 (1923); 23,293 (1934)

History
- Opened: 1893
- Closed: 1934

Technical
- Line length: 183 m (600 ft)
- Number of tracks: 1, with 1 passing loop
- Rack system: bespoke
- Track gauge: 1,440 mm (4 ft 8 11/16 in)
- Operating speed: 2 m/s (7.2 km/h; 4.5 mph)

The Bellevue funicular (French: funiculaire de Bellevue), in Meudon, Hauts-de-Seine department, was from 1893 to 1934 a funicular running from the Bellevue-Funiculaire station on the Coteaux line (today, Brimborion), to the Gare de Bellevue, on the Paris–Brest railway line.

== Description ==
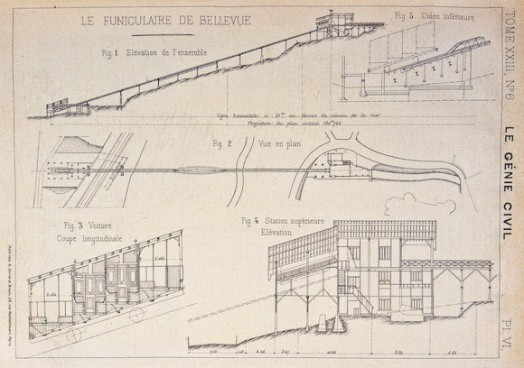
Plan of the funicular and the Bellevue station.

The line, designed by the engineers Guyenet, Madamet and Tinel, was 183 m (600 ft) of single track rising 52.44 m (172.0 ft).

After being permitted to cross the Coteaux line, the lower station was raised 3.5 m (11 ft) to connect with the route from Vaugirard (Bas Meudon), thus requiring passengers to climb a staircase, clearly seen on the left of the station.

With a constant gradient of 16° 56' (about 30%), it was entirely built on a viaduct of twelve metal sections, resting on five lattice pillars and two masonry abutments with a foundation of solid brick. A passing loop was provided in the middle of the route. The Vignole rails weighed 30 kg/m (20 lb/ft), at a track gauge of 1,440 mm (4 ft 8 11/16 in). Safety brakes were provided by a rack rail.

Traction was provided by two fixed 54 hp (40 kW) steam engines, though only one was used in normal conditions. The cabins were attached by herringbone gears to cables wound on drums of 2.8 m (9 ft 2 in) diameter, moving at a speed of 2 m/s (7.2 km/h; 4.5 mph), one drum winding and the other unwinding, to haul a cabin of 59 passengers. The weight of the ascending carriage would be partly counterbalanced by that of the other descending. The journey took between one-and-a-half and two minutes.

Operation needed at least four people: two drivers (one for each car), a mechanic and a boilerman for the steam engine.

== History ==
In 1891, two businessmen from Meudon (Gabriel Thomas and Paul Houette, a local councillor), agreed to build a funicular to connect the Seine to the heights of Meudon and so to give walkers access to the Forest of Meudon.

In 1893, a line opened connecting the two railway stations and the steamboats on the river. At the start of its operation, the line worked with a departure every five minutes from 7 am until 7:30 pm in winter, and from 6 am until 10:45 pm in summer. The fares for ascent were 20 centimes on Sundays and holidays and 10 centimes on other days; descent cost 10 centimes at all times. In the first twenty months of operation, passengers numbered 550,000.

Nevertheless, the line made a considerable loss in the winter season; the service was soon curtailed to the summer season, from 1 April until November. In 1895, the funicular transported 266,662 passengers and 3,480 bicycles. But the deficit was still 2,047 francs and a grant of 3,500 francs was requested from the Commune of Meudon, which the municipal council rejected on 5 May 1895.

From 1917 until Easter 1922 the line was inactive, following the mobilization of personnel for the First World War. In 1923, the funicular transported 171,126 passengers. But in 1932 the chronic losses of the line forced services to be cut to Sundays only. The line had only 23,293 passengers in 1934, and it was finally decided to abandon the line in 1938. After a period of rail adhesion trials with a horizontal wheel gripping a central rail, the infrastructure was totally dismantled after the Second World War.

== Future projects ==
Since 2005, a new Bellevue funicular project has been proposed. The RATP carried out a feasibility study concerned with creating public transport in reserved lanes connecting two quatiers of Meudon: Meudon-sur-Seine (on Paris Tramway Line 2) and Meudon Bellevue (Transilien station). Although the intention is to resurrect the funicular for the 21st century, its route and technology will be very different. The new permanent way will climb nearly 60 m (197 ft) in a curving path, as far as the Rue Henri-Savignac and the Pavé des Gardes. The aim is to allow the residents of the Meudon heights more easy access to:

- The industrial areas of Meudon-sur-Seine and the future industrial areas of Boulogne-Billancourt, via the future Tramway Meudon - Boulogne - Saint-Cloud;
- Paris and La Défense, via Paris Tramway Line 2.

As of the end of 2008, this project remained very uncertain and nothing definite had been said about its eventual construction or financing.

== Old postcards ==
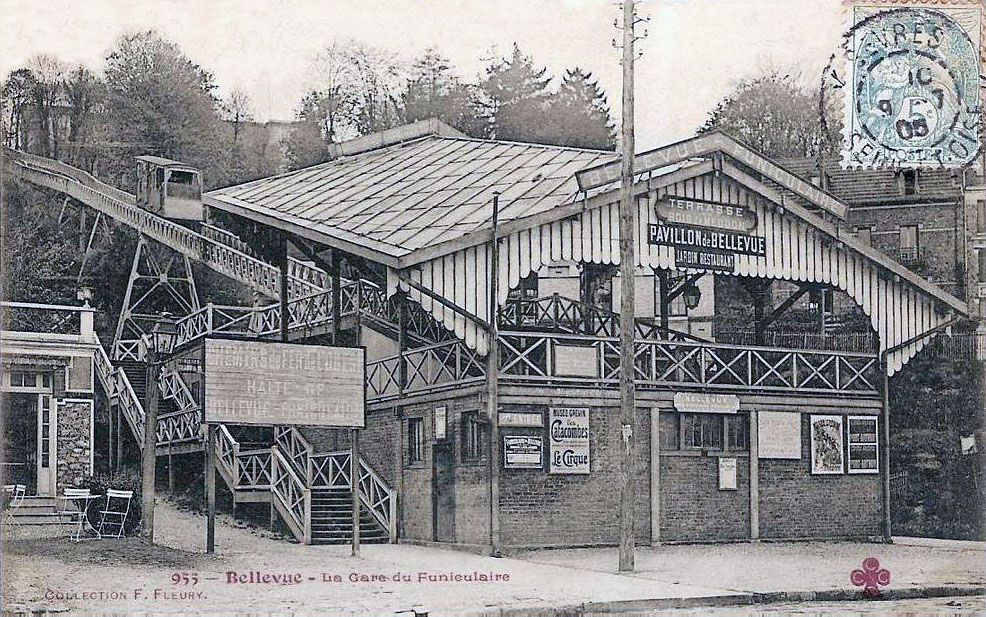
The lower station of the funicular. The departure platform is raised 3.5 m (11 ft), allowing the funicular to pass over the line from Coteaux.

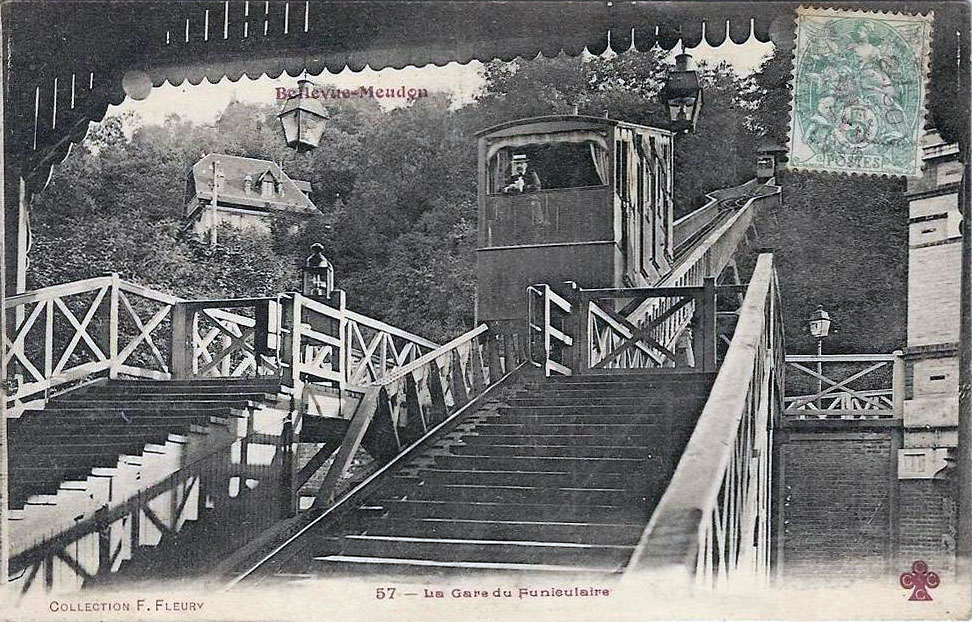
Inside the funicular station

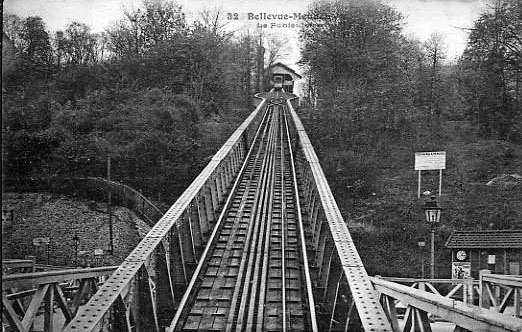
Funicular track. The rails are of Vignole type, as used on railways

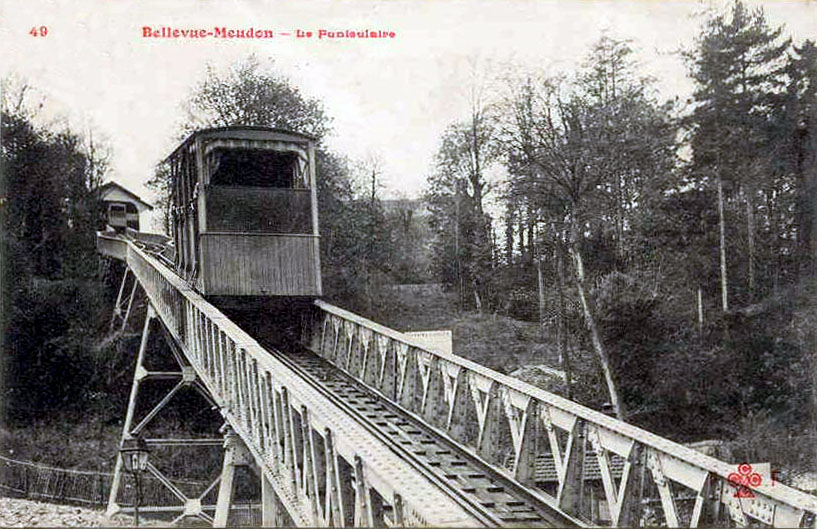
Funicular cabin. Each of the cabins could hold 52 or 59 people (sources vary).

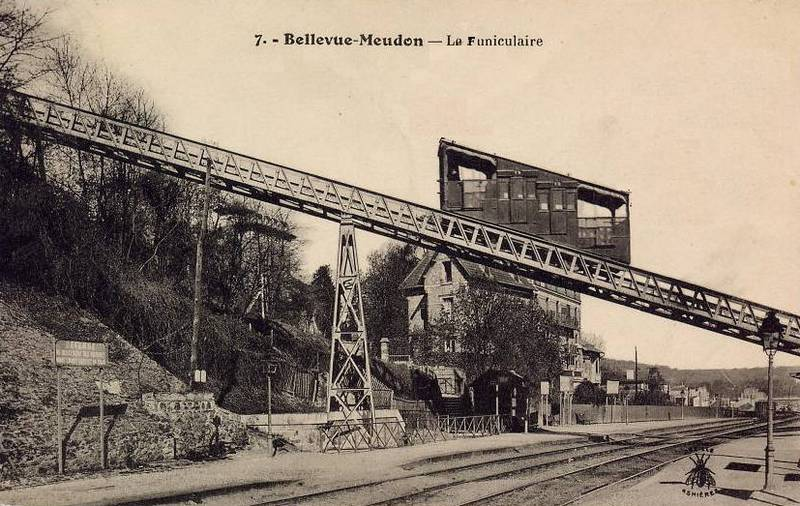
The viaduct comprising twelve sections, of which the longest, at 22 m (72 ft) crossed the tracks of the Coteaux line.

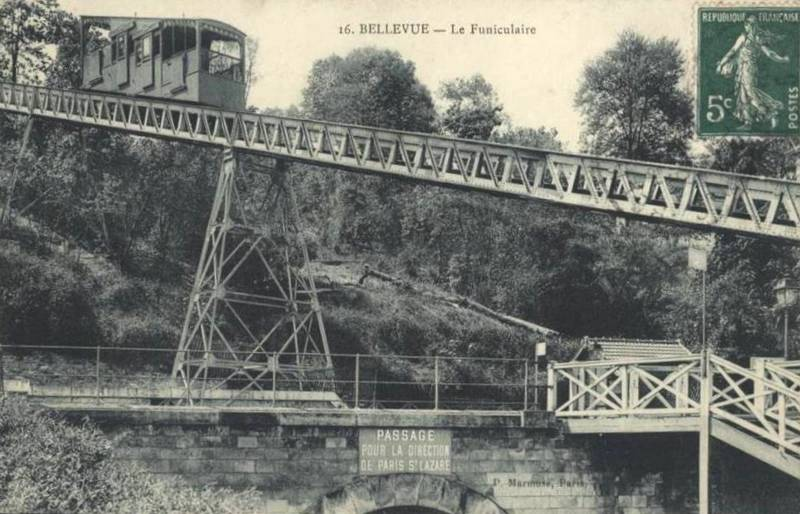

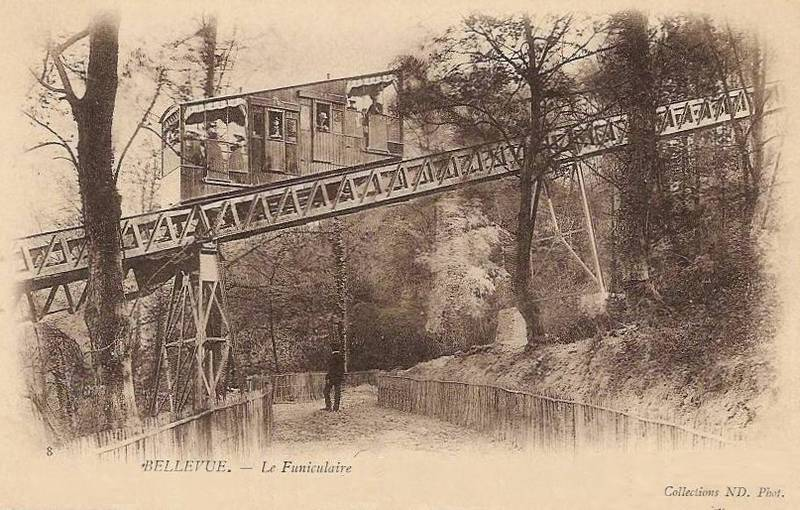
Each cabin weighed 8 t (7.9 long tons; 8.8 short tons) unladen and was made of four wooden compartmental sections, two closed in the middle and two open at the ends.

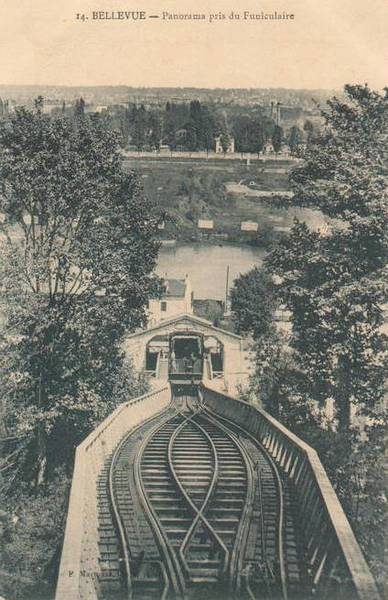
The central passing loop; between the rails one can see the steel wire rope, of 0.033 metres (1.3 in) diameter (weighing 3.75 kg/m (2.52 lb/ft)) which provided the traction for the cabins

A model of the funicular is exhibited at the Meudon Museum of Art and History.

== See also ==
- Meudon Viaduct

== Sources ==
- Gennesseaux, Jean (1992). Funiculaires et crémaillères de France [French funiculars and rack railways] (in French). La Vie du Rail. ISBN 978-2-902808-42-7.
- Angelier, Maryse (2003). La France ferroviaire en cartes postales – Île-de-France [French rail in postcards] (in French). Vol. I: Ouest et Nord-ouest ("West and northwest"). Paris: La Vie du Rail. ISBN 2-915034-10-9.
