= Meudon station =

Railroad station Meudon, France

Coordinates: 48°48′54″N 2°14′27″E

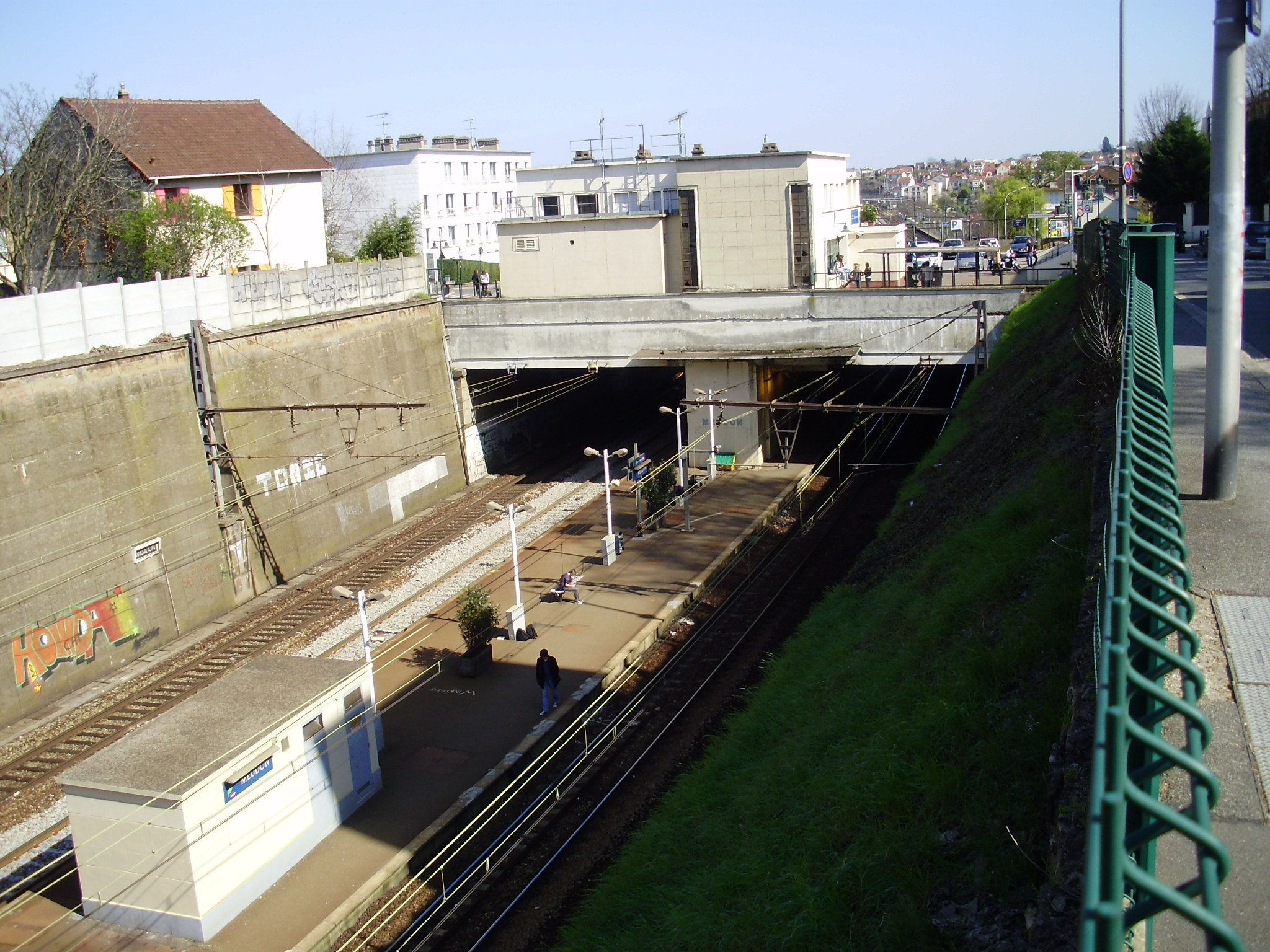
Gare de Meudon

Meudon is a railway station in Meudon, a southwestern suburb of Paris, France. It is on the Paris–Brest railway. It is served by Transilien trains from Paris-Montparnasse to Rambouillet, Dreux and Mantes-la-Jolie.

Preceding station	Transilien	Following station
Clamart towards Paris-Montparnasse	Line N	Bellevue towards Dreux, Mantes-la-Jolie or Rambouillet
