= Bellevue station (France) =

Railway station in Meudon, France

Bellevue
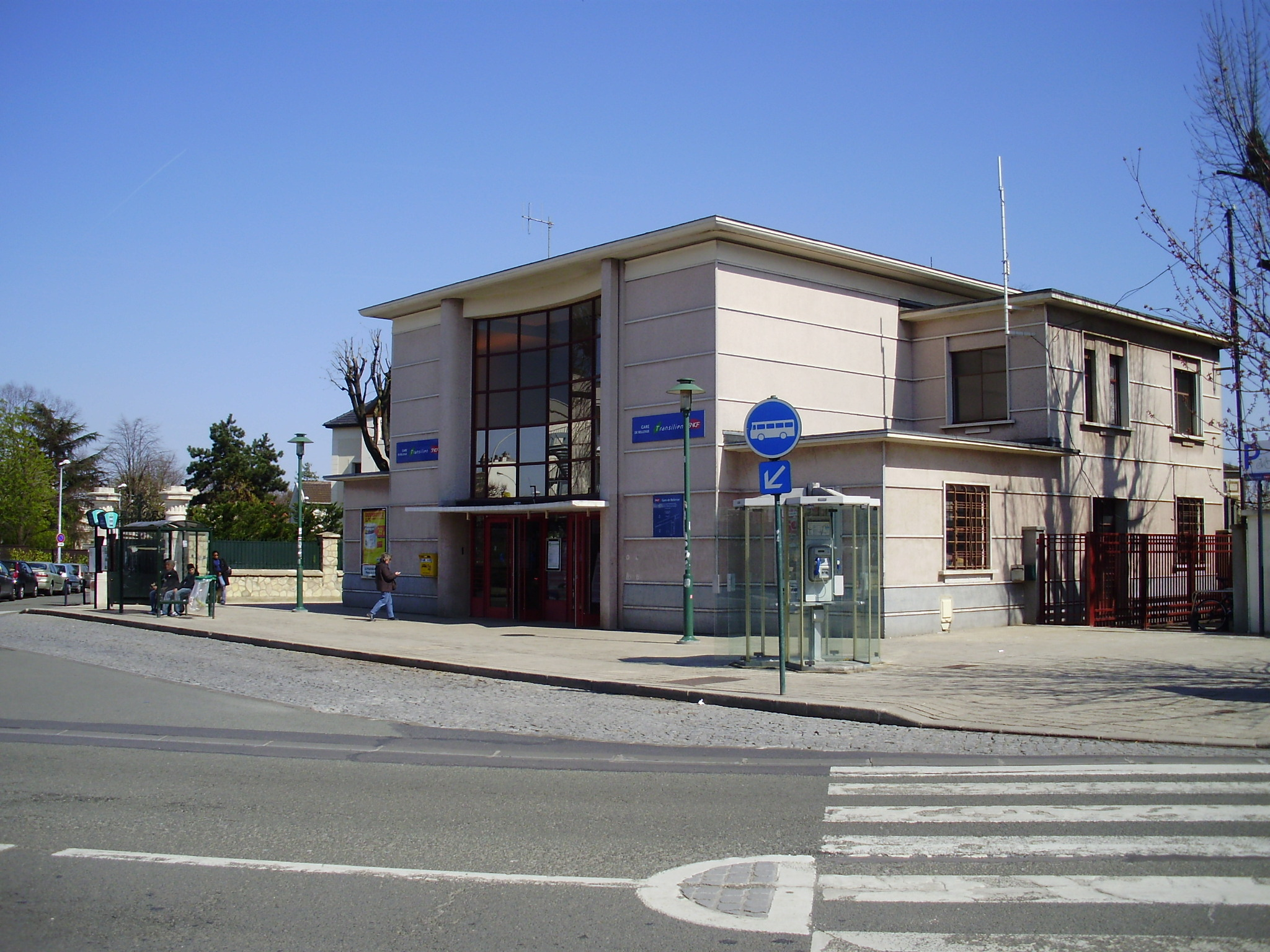
- Station entrance on the Avenue du Général Gallieni

General information
- Location: 27 Avenue du Général Gallieni, Meudon
- Coordinates: 48.8197°N 2.2282°E
- Owner: SNCF
- Line: Paris–Brest railway
- Platforms: 1 island platform 2 side platforms
- Tracks: 4

Other information
- Station code: 87393116
- Fare zone: IDF/3

History
- Opened: 10 September 1840

Passengers
- 2024: 1,455,710

Services
Preceding station	Transilien	Following station
Meudon towards Paris-Montparnasse	Line N	Sèvres-Rive-Gauche towards Dreux, Mantes-la-Jolie or Rambouillet
Location

Bellevue (French pronunciation: [bɛlvy]) is a railway station in the French commune of Meudon in the Île-de-France region. It is on the Paris–Brest railway. It is served by Transilien trains from Paris-Montparnasse to Rambouillet, Dreux and Mantes-la-Jolie.

== History ==
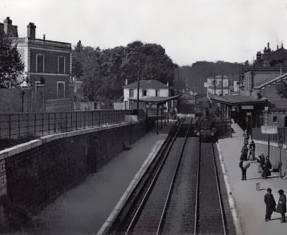
Bellevue station and the left bank of the river, late 19th or early 20th century

From 1893 to 1934, the station served as an interchange with the upper station of the Bellevue funicular.

== Station ==
The station is served by trains on the Transilien Line N.

The station had two staggered side platforms and a central island platform, serving four tracks. Access between platforms was via an underpass. The two side platforms were used in case of difficulty or track maintenance.

The current structures date from the 1930s, when the Montparnasse to Versailles line was quadrupled by Raoul Dautry.

== Interchanges ==
- Bus: 169, 389, TIM
- Night bus: N61

== In modern times ==
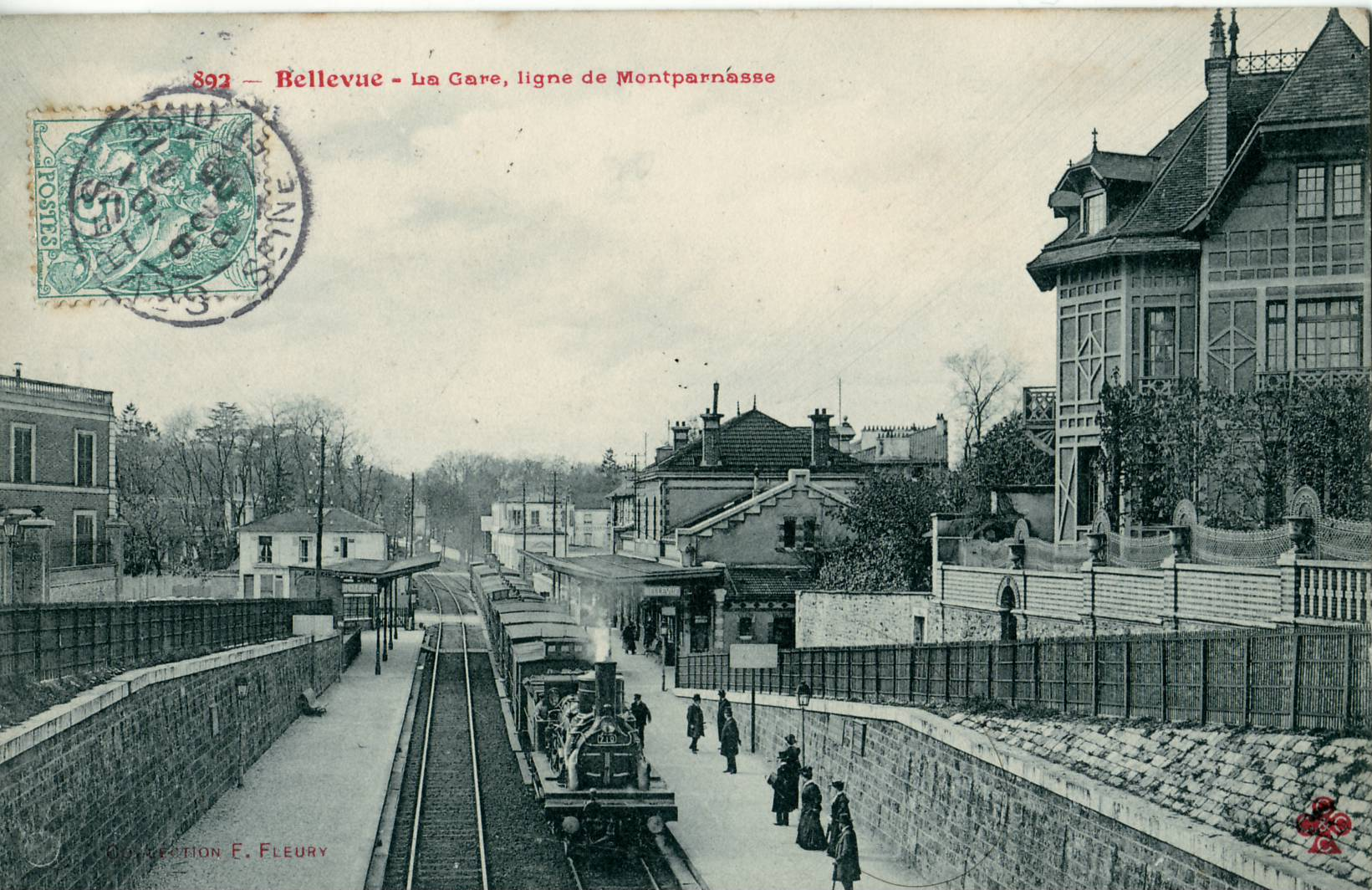
Station at the start of the 20th century

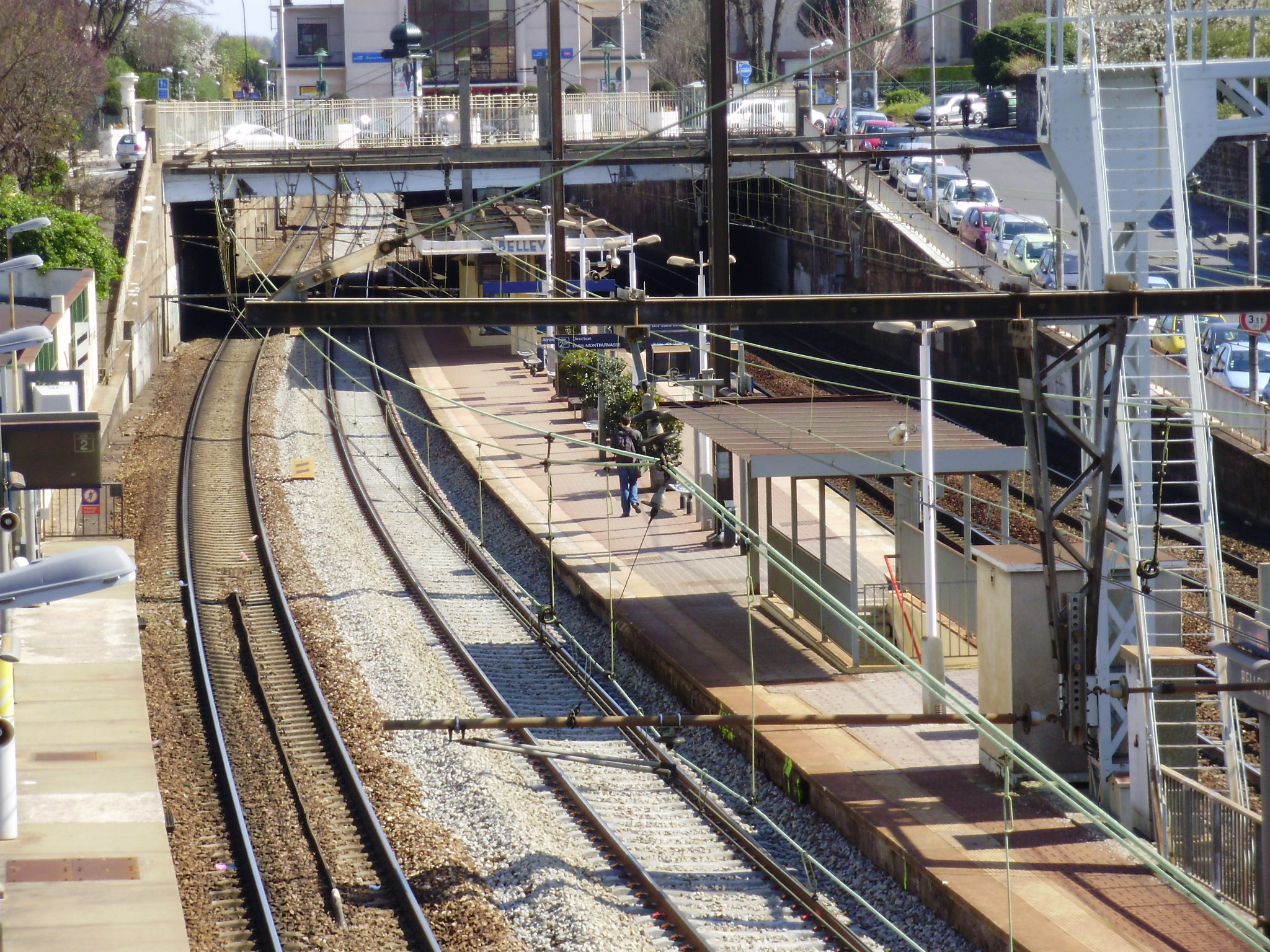
Island platform and, to the left, side platform for the direction of Paris-Montparnasse

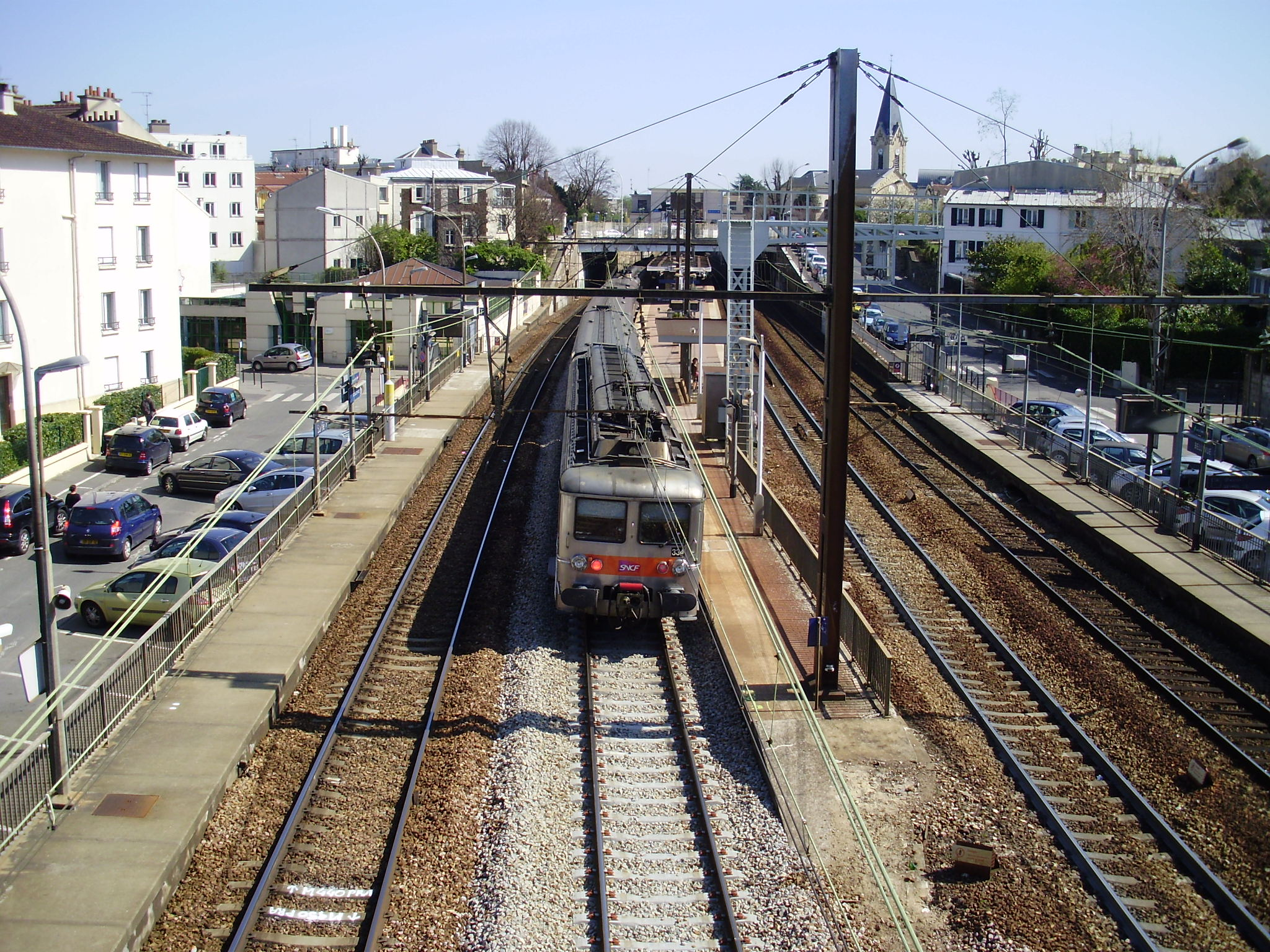
Train stopping at platform 2b, towards Paris-Montparnasse.
To the left and right, the side platforms can be seen

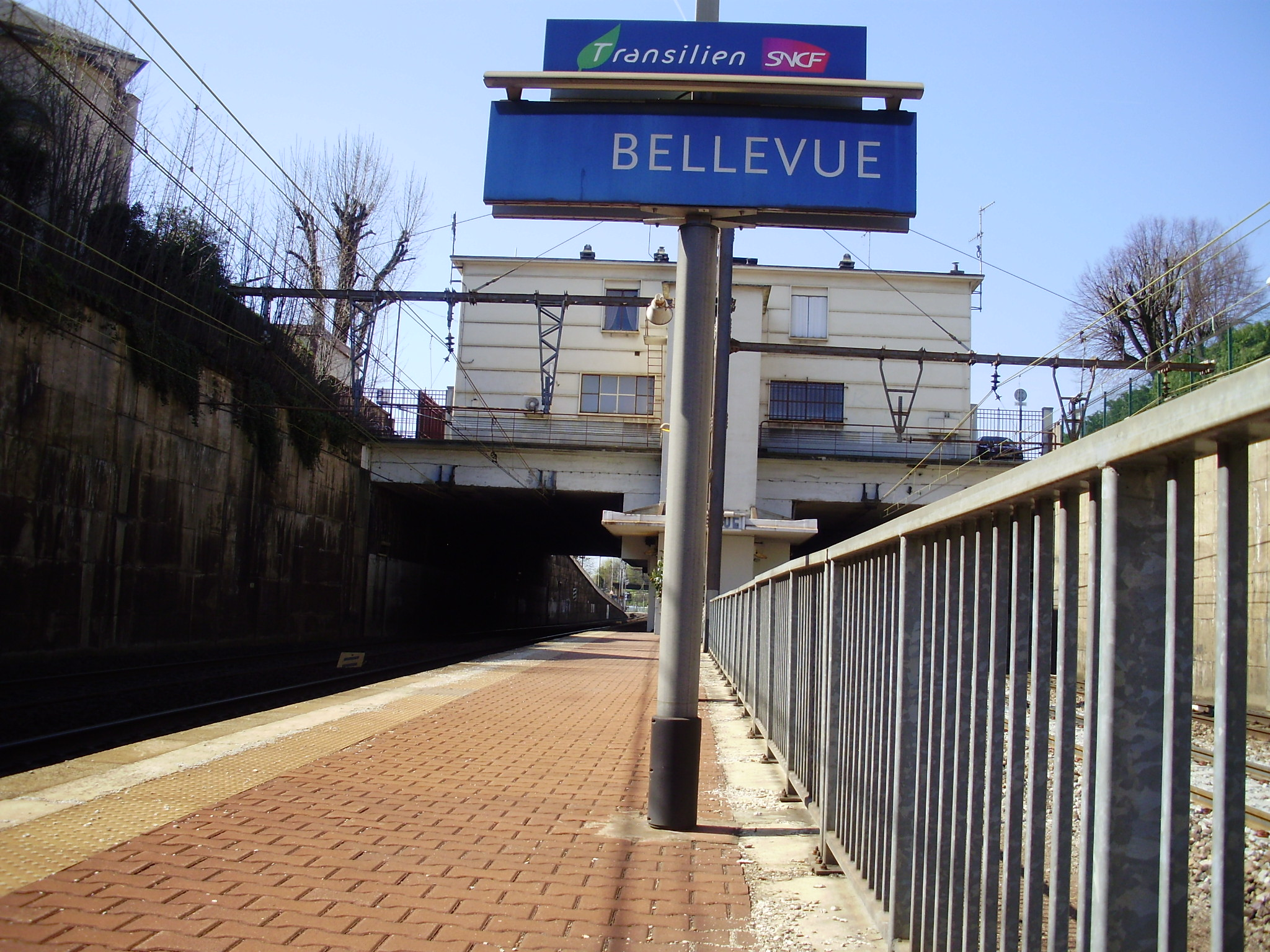
Rear of the station building
