= Meudon =

- Commune
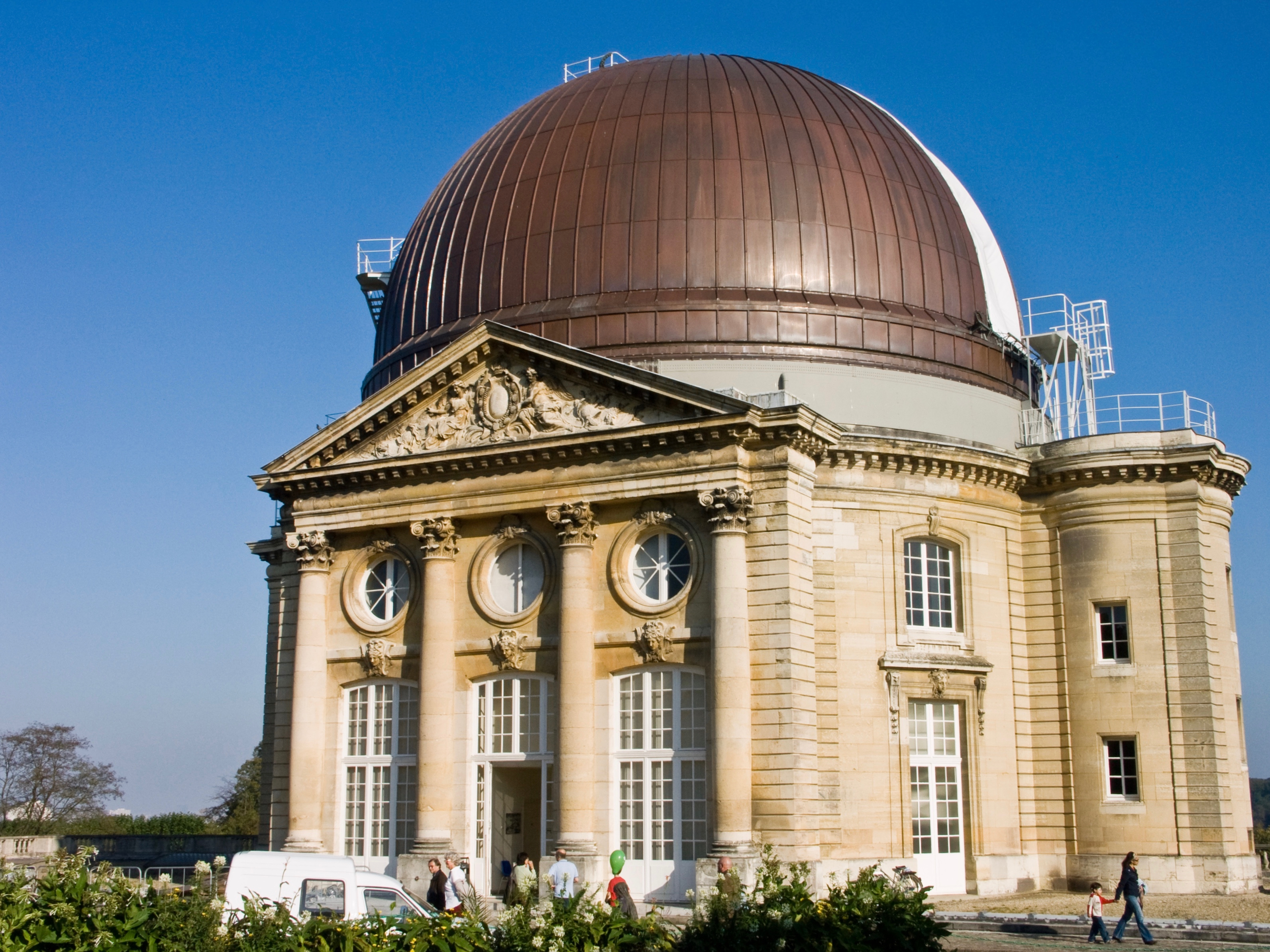
- Observatory of Meudon

- Coat of arms

- Location (in red) within Paris inner suburbs
- Location of Meudon
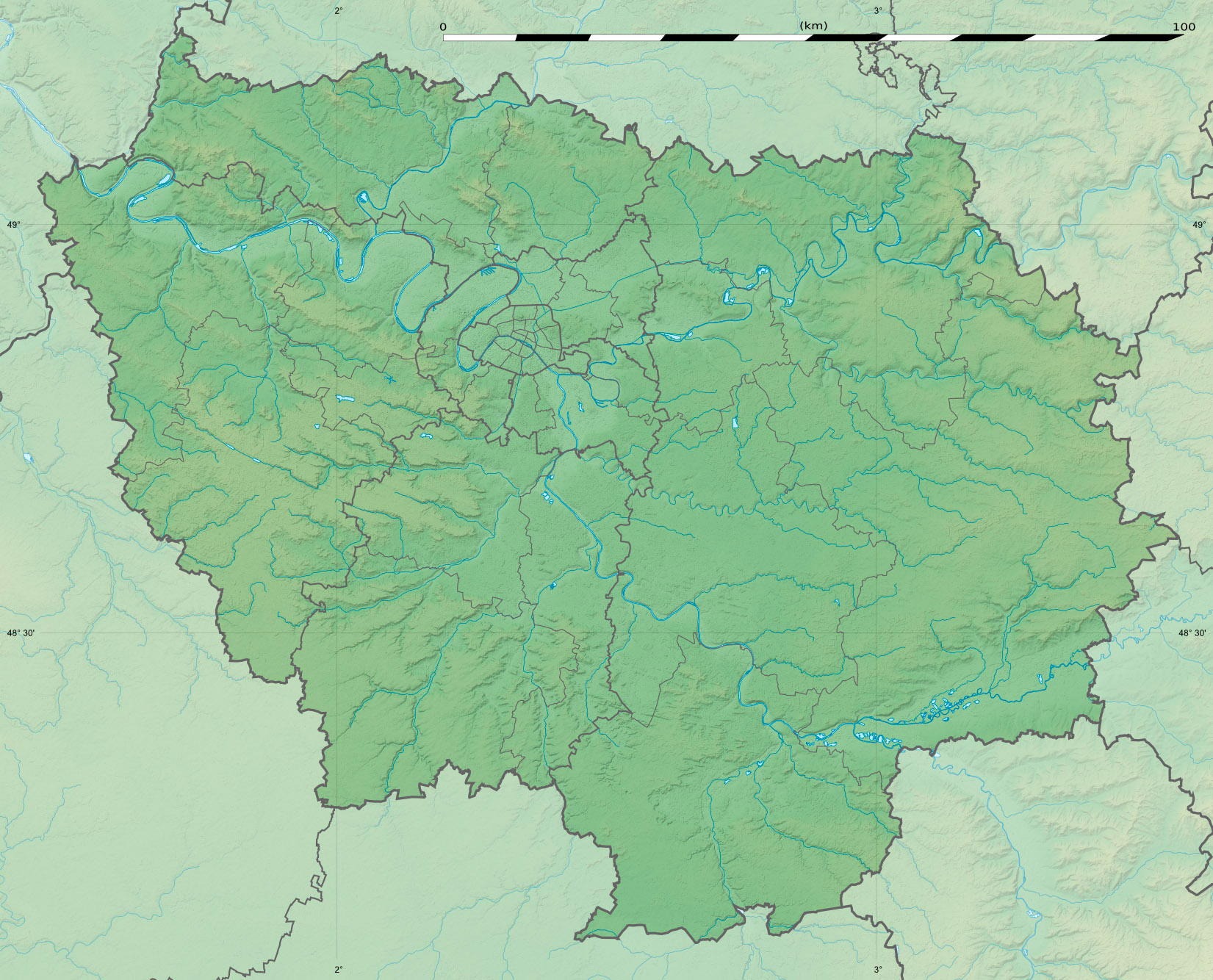
- Location within France Location within Île-de-France (region)
- Coordinates: 48°48′46″N 02°14′18″E
- Country: France
- Region: Île-de-France
- Department: Hauts-de-Seine
- Arrondissement: Boulogne-Billancourt
- Canton: Meudon
- Intercommunality: Grand Paris

Government
  - Mayor (2026–32): Denis Larghero (UDI)
- Area^{1}: 9.90 km^{2} (3.82 sq mi)
- Elevation: 103 m (338 ft)
- Highest elevation: 179 m (587 ft)
- Lowest elevation: 28 m (92 ft)
- Population (2023): 46,334
  - Density: 4,680/km^{2} (12,100/sq mi)
- Time zone: UTC+01:00 (CET)
  - Summer (DST): UTC+02:00 (CEST)
- INSEE/Postal code: 92048 /92190, 92360
- ^{1} French Land Register data, which excludes lakes, ponds, glaciers > 1 km^{2} (0.386 sq mi or 247 acres) and river estuaries.

Meudon (French pronunciation: [mødɔ̃]) is a French commune located in the Hauts-de-Seine department in the Île-de-France region, on the left bank of the Seine. It is located 9.1 km (5.7 mi) from the center of Paris.

The city is covered by the Meudon Domanial Forest that accounts for half of its surface, a rarity in the close suburbs of Paris. Also, the city presents many significant grades and contains the geographic high point of the innermost Paris suburbs.

The city is mainly known for its forest and its observatory, that specializes in astrophysics and observation of the sun, but has also been home to celebrities such as Auguste Rodin, Richard Wagner, Louis Ferdinand Céline, Pascal Manoukian, Ambroise Paré and Armande Béjart.

== Geography ==
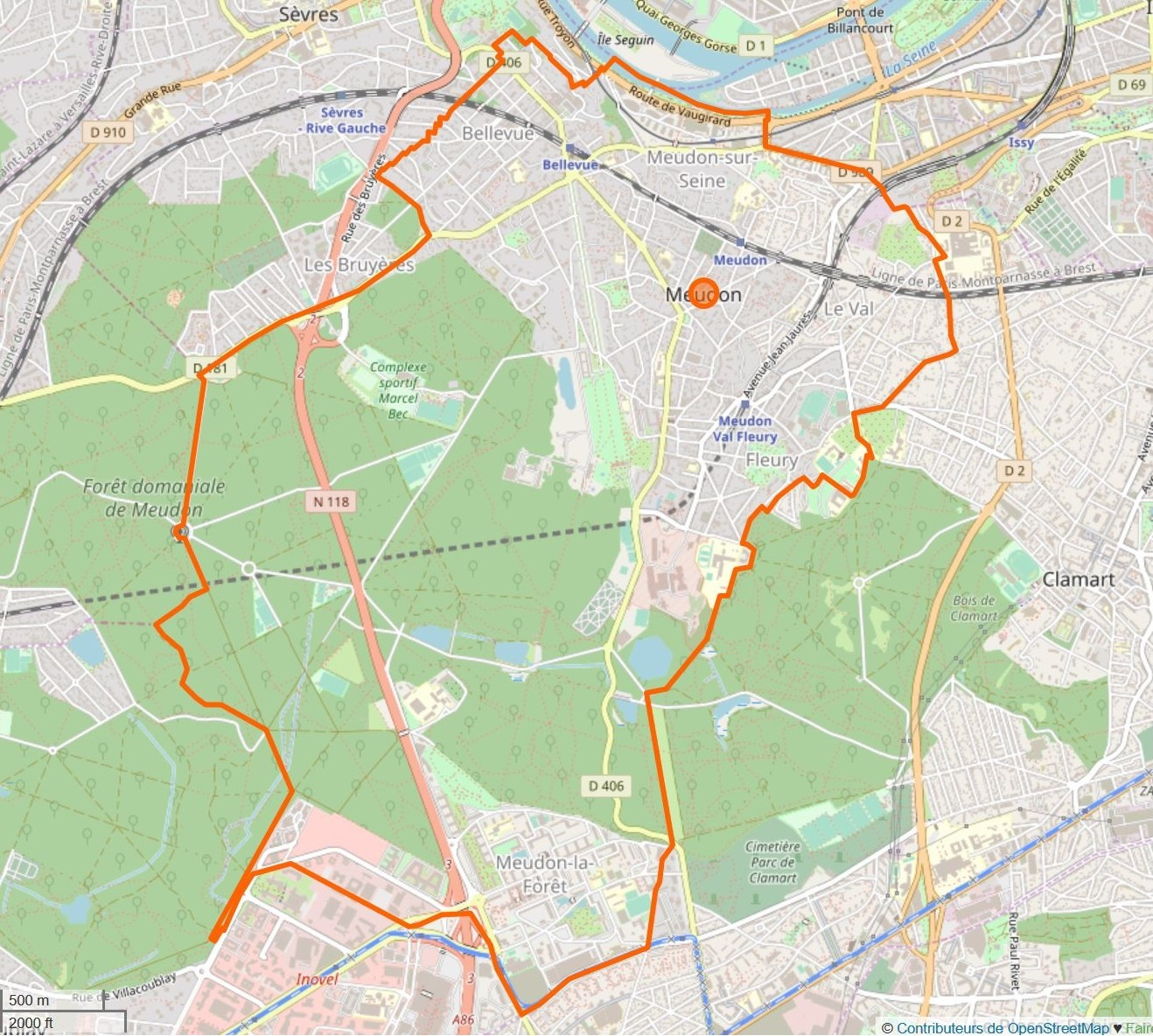
Map of the commune, extracted from OpenStreetMap.

=== Localization ===
The town of Meudon is built on the hills and valleys of the Seine, in the south-west of the Hauts-de-Seine department. The forest of Meudon lies for the most part to the west of the town.

The north-west part of Meudon, overlooking the Seine, is known as Bellevue ("beautiful view").

The neighboring communes are: Sèvres (North-west), Boulogne-Billancourt (North); Issy-les-Moulineaux (northeast), Clamart (east and southeast), Vélizy (south and southwest) and Chaville (west).

The town includes several districts: Meudon-sur-Seine, Val Fleury, Meudon-Centre, Bellevue and Meudon-la-Forêt.

=== Geology and Topography ===
The city covers 990 hectares, or 9.9 km^{2} (3.8 mi^{2}), from the Seine river up to the neighboring heights.

As such, it has significant elevation changes along its territory and hard slopes. Altitude varies from 28 m (92 ft) next to the river to 179 m (587 ft) on the valley heights.

The Meudon Forest occupies the city heights, while the urban part is built on the sloped grounds next to the forest. The Bas-Meudon district, next to the Seine, displays the first slopes, the Bellevue district and downtown Meudon are at middle elevation. The Meudon-la-Forêt district is isolated from the rest of city, and rests on top of the Vélizy-Villacoublay plateau, at a height comprised between 168 m (551 ft) and 174 m (570 ft).

=== Climate ===
Meudon experiences an oceanic climate (Köppen Cfb) featuring warm summers and cool winters.

== History ==
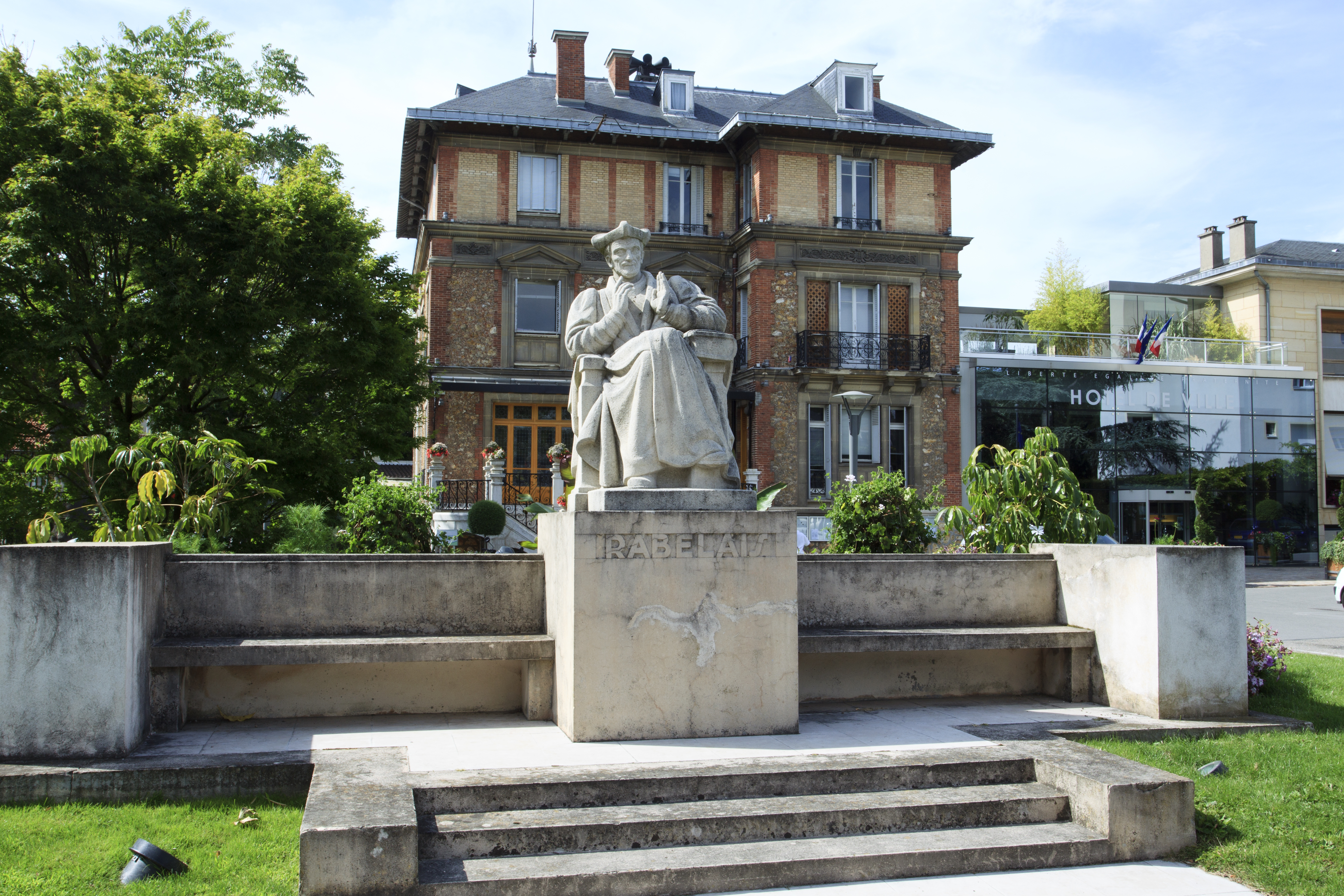
The Hôtel de Ville

Louis Eugène Robert, a naturalist doctor that lived in Meudon, published the book History and Natural Description of the Meudon Commune (French) in 1843.

At Meudon, the argile plastique clay was extensively mined in the 19th century. The first fossil of the European diatryma Gastornis parisiensis was discovered in these deposits by Gaston Planté.

=== Roman Times ===
Archeological sites found at Meudon show that it may have been populated since the Neolithic times. Gauls named the site Mole-Dum (sand dune), and the Romans Latinized the name as Moldunum.

=== Middle Ages ===
The oldest known Lord of Meudon is the knight Erkenbold, in 1180.

During the Middle Ages, the history of Meudon is linked to the Meudon Family, an old family of the French nobility.

The Saint-Germain abbey held a seigneurerie at Meudon since the 12th century, despite that monastery having no official title granting such rights over the city before the 13th century.

In 1235, Simon, the Saint-Germain abbot, buys back the wheat and wine tithes from Etienne de Meudon. The abbot then continued to buy land in Meudon.

In 1333, Robert de Meudon is panetier to King Philip VI of France, and its son Henri de Meudon is grand huntsman.

=== Renaissance ===
The old castle of Meudon was rebuilt in Renaissance style in the mid-sixteenth century. It was bought by Louis XIV as a residence for his son Louis, the Dauphin under whom Meudon became a center of aristocratic life.

After the death of the Dauphin in 1711, the château was neglected, emptied in the Revolutionary sales, and finally burned in 1871 at the close of the Franco-Prussian War, while it was occupied by Prussian soldiers.

A branch of the Paris Observatory was founded on the ruins in 1877.

=== Modern Times ===
The handsome Galliera Institutions, on the hill of Fleury, were founded by the duchess of Galliera for the care of aged persons and orphans. The buildings were completed in 1885.

The Hôtel de Ville was commissioned as a private house and was completed in 1888.

==== Automotive pioneering ====
Nicolas-Joseph Cugnot, the inventor of the 'world's first automobile', is reported to have carried out some early trials at Meudon in the early 1770s.

==== Pioneering aviation ====
Chalais-Meudon was important in the pioneering of aviation, initially balloons and airships, but also the early heavier-than-air machines. A Corps d'Aérostatiers under the command of Jean-Marie-Joseph Coutelle was established in 1794, its balloons being used at the Battle of Fleurus. 'Hangar Y' (at 48.7977°N 2.233°E) was built in 1880 at the request of the military engineer Captain Charles Renard (1847–1905), for the construction of balloons and airships. The building is 70 m (230 ft) long, 24 m (79 ft) wide and around 26 m (85 ft) high.

The airship La France, designed by Renard and Arthur Krebs, was built in Hangar Y in 1884 and was the first airship which was controllable during flight and which could return to its starting point.

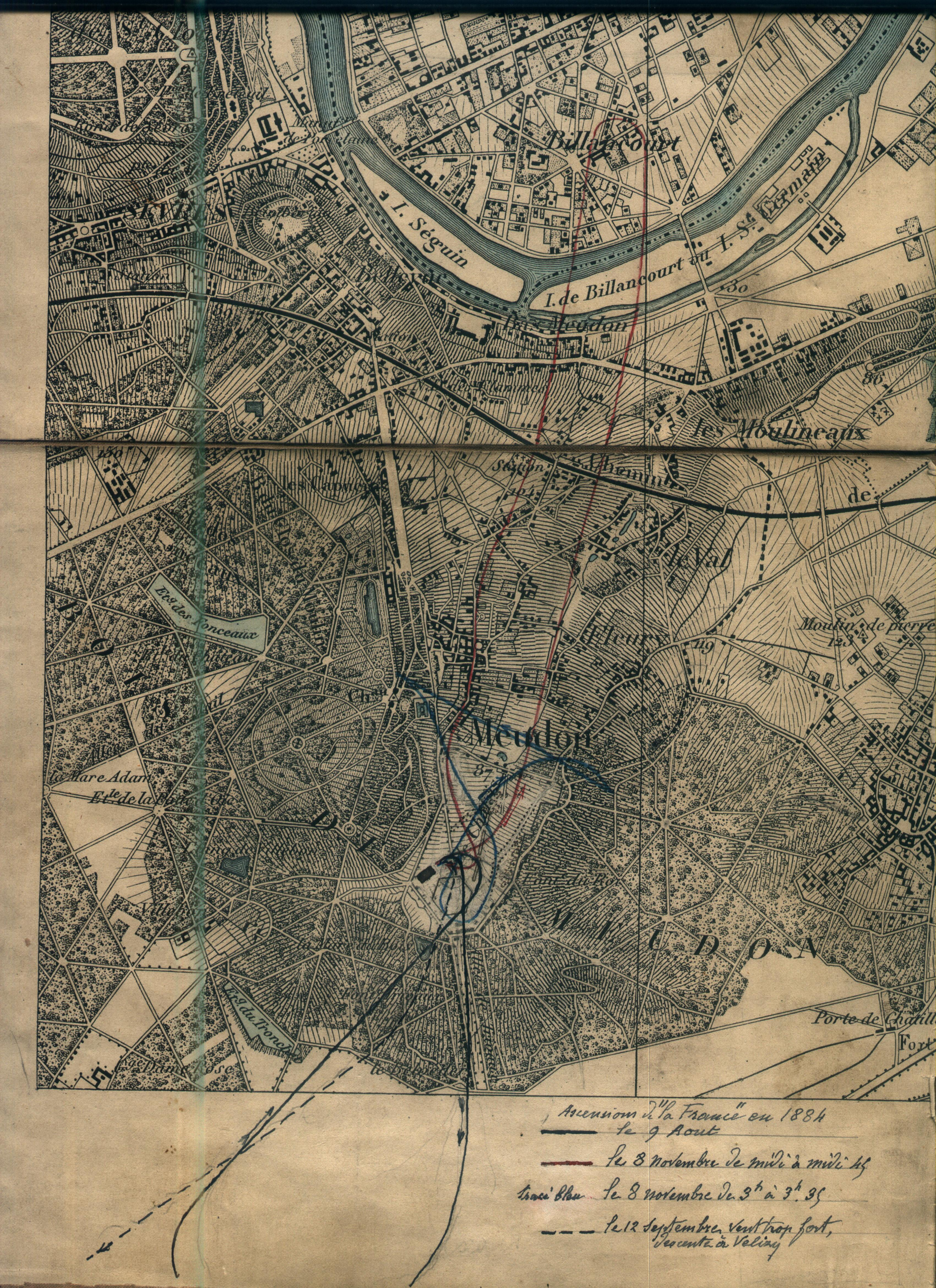
The 1884 Krebs & Renard first fully controllable free-flights with the LA FRANCE electric dirigible in Meudon near Paris (Krebs arch.)

== Population ==
Historical population

Year	Pop.	±% p.a.
1793	2,250	—
1800	2,015	−1.56%
1806	2,311	+2.31%
1821	2,265	−0.13%
1831	3,026	+2.94%
1836	3,233	+1.33%
1841	3,174	−0.37%
1846	3,680	+3.00%
1851	3,783	+0.55%
1856	4,789	+4.83%
1861	5,157	+1.49%
1866	6,620	+5.12%
1872	12,037	+10.48%
1876	6,425	−14.53%
1881	6,080	−1.10%
1886	7,621	+4.62%
1891	8,005	+0.99%
1896	8,892	+2.12%
1901	9,702	+1.76%

Year	Pop.	±% p.a.
1906	10,289	+1.18%
1911	12,292	+3.62%
1921	15,649	+2.44%
1926	18,123	+2.98%
1931	20,870	+2.86%
1936	20,749	−0.12%
1946	20,797	+0.02%
1954	24,729	+2.19%
1962	34,878	+4.39%
1968	50,623	+6.41%
1975	52,806	+0.60%
1982	48,450	−1.22%
1990	45,339	−0.83%
1999	43,663	−0.42%
2007	44,873	+0.34%
2012	45,107	+0.10%
2017	45,352	+0.11%
2023	46,334	+0.36%

Source: EHESS and INSEE (1968-2023)

== Economy ==
Although a choice residential district, access to the railway (RER) and the Seine river have made Meudon a manufacturing center since the 1840s.

Metal products and military explosives have been continuously produced there since then.

In recent times, the town's economy has shifted toward services from its manufacturing origins. Thales Group, HP, Vallourec and Sodexo have offices in the Meudon Campus business district at Meudon-sur-Seine.

== Scientific facilities ==
In addition to the Observatory, what is today ONERA, a national aerospace research institute and wind tunnel has been present since the military opened its aerostatic (lighter-than-air) field in the Chalais park in 1877. From 1921 to 1981 the Air Museum was located here until it moved to Le Bourget Airport.

The French National Centre for Scientific Research has a campus in Bellevue.

== Public transport ==
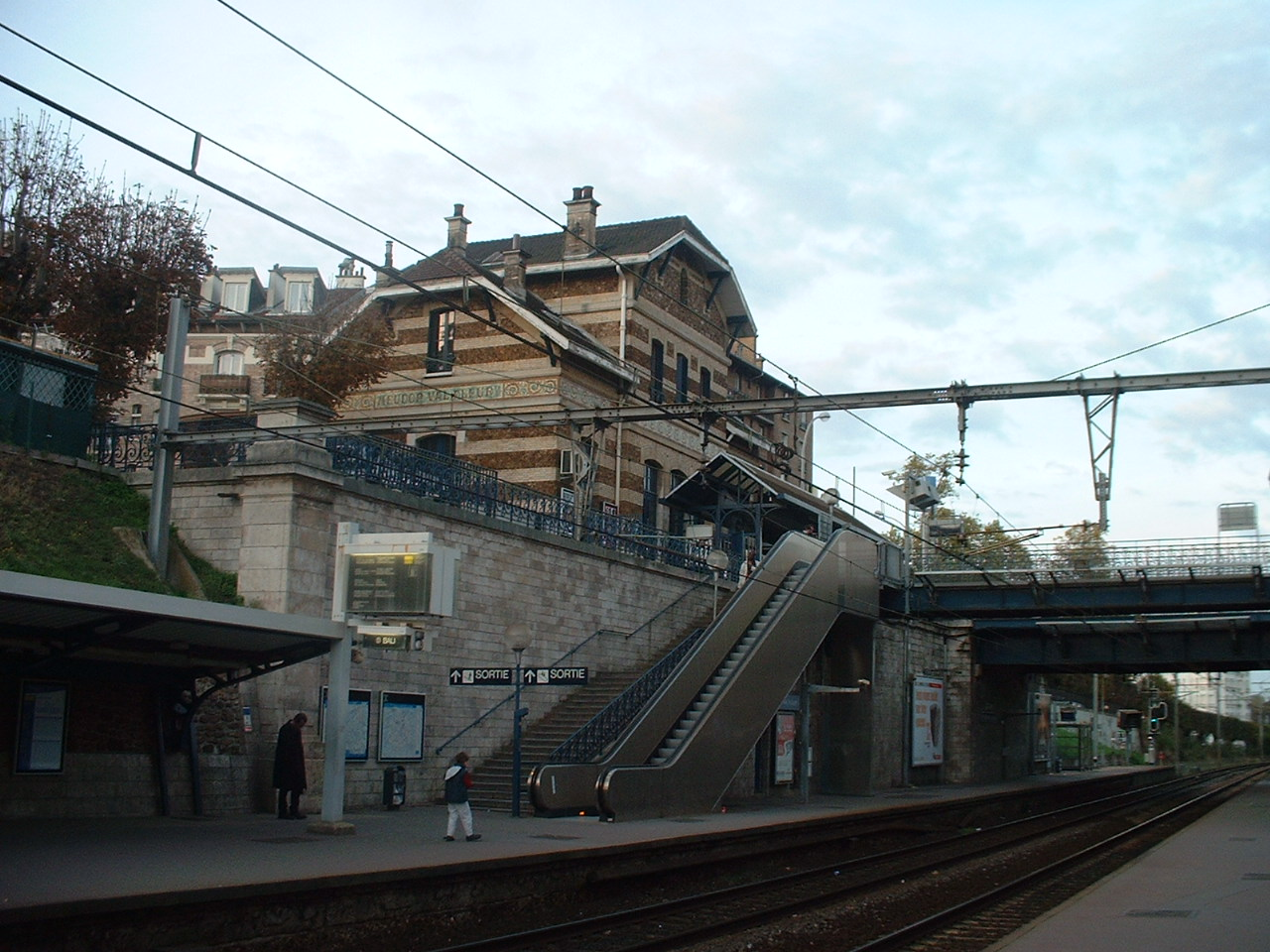
Meudon Val Fleury station

Meudon is well served by public transport operated jointly by the SNCF and the RATP.

=== Réseau Express Régional (RER) – Line C ===
Meudon is served by line C of the RER by Meudon-Val Fleury station.

=== Transilien – Transilien Line N ===
Meudon is also served by the Transilien Line N through Meudon station and Bellevue station.

=== Tramway – T2 and T6 ===
Meudon is served along the Seine by two stations on the T2 tramway line: Meudon-sur-Seine and Brimborion. This line links the Porte de Versailles in the south to the Pont de Bezons in the north, serving the La Défense business district.

The T6 tramway line runs from Châtillon to Viroflay. Meudon is served by Georges Millandy and Meudon la Forêt stations.

=== RATP bus network ===
Meudon is served by twelve lines of the RATP bus network, that have numerous stops in the city:

- Line 162 runs from Arceuil – Cachan RER station to Villejuif-Louis Aragon.
- Line 169 runs from Pont de Sèvres to the Georges Pompidou hospital.
- Line 179 runs from Pont de Sèvres to the Robinson RER station.
- Line 190 runs from Petit Clamart to Mairie d'Issy.
- Line 289 runs from Porte de Saint-Cloud to Clamart – Cité de la Plaine.
- Line 290 runs from Le Plessis-Robinson to Issy-Val-de-Seine.
- Line 291 runs from Pont de Sèvres to Vélizy Europe Sud.
- Line 379 runs from Vélizy 2 to Antony – La Croix de Berny RER station.
- Line 389 runs from Pont de Sèvres to Meudon-la-Forêt.
- Line 390 runs from Vélizy Villacoublay to the Bourg-la-Reine RER station.

The area was once served by the Bellevue funicular, a model of which is in the local Museum of Art and History.

== Education ==
Public schools:

- Three groups of preschools and elementary schools
- Nine standalone preschools
- Six standalone public elementary schools
- Three junior high schools: Collège Armande Béjart, Collège Bel Air, Collège Rabelais
- Two senior high schools: Lycée Rabelais and Lycée des métiers Les Côtes de Villebon

Private schools:

- One junior and senior high school: Institut Notre-Dame
- One elementary school through junior high school
- Three preschools-elementary schools

== International relations ==
Meudon is twinned with:

- Celle, Germany
- Ciechanów, Poland
- Mazkeret Batia, Israel
- Rushmoor, England, United Kingdom
- Woluwe-Saint-Lambert, Belgium
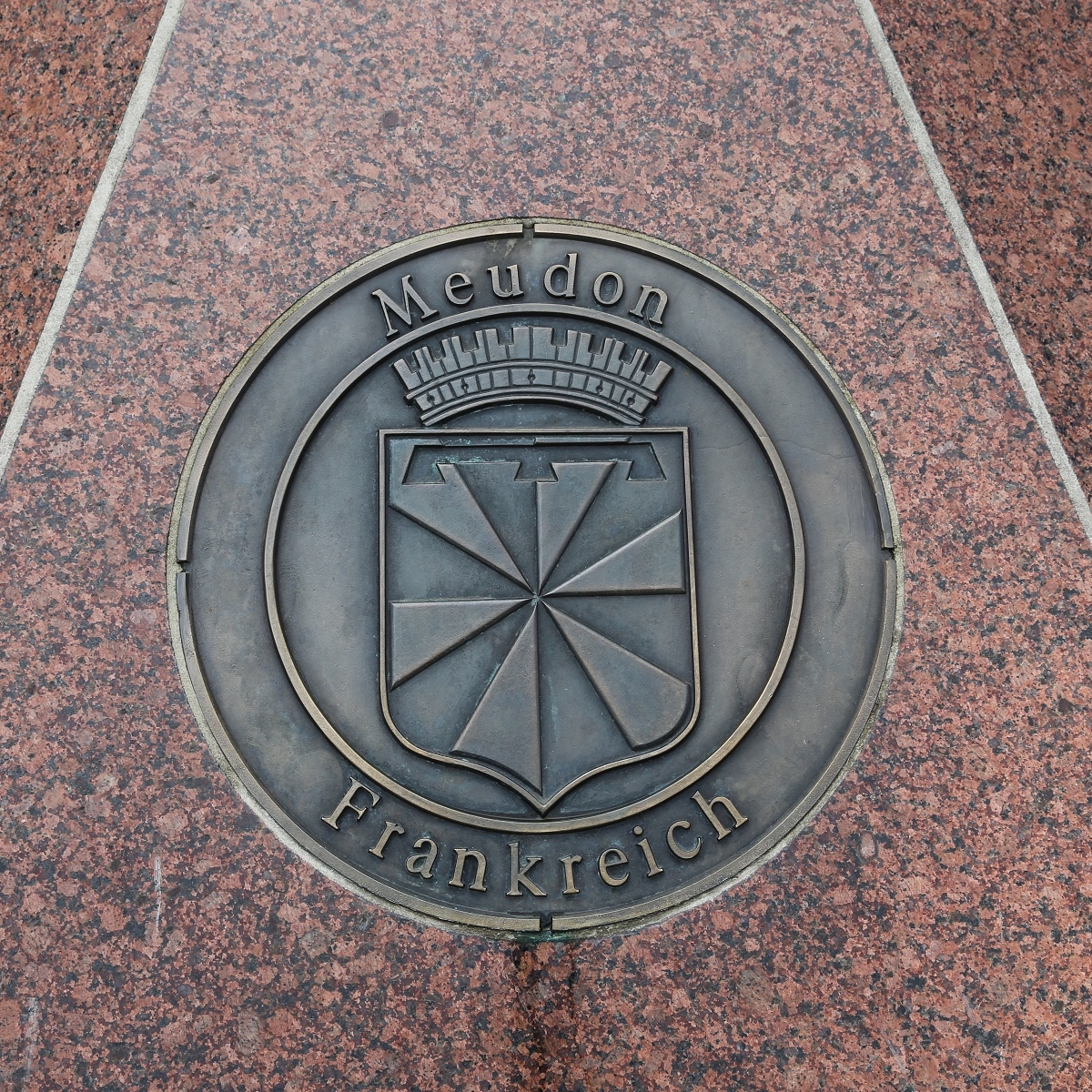
Coat of arms at twin town Celle (Germany), granite artwork below signpost

== Cultural heritage ==
The Imperial Cedar (Cèdre Impérial), attracted the attention of Empress Eugénie and Queen Victoria. As of March 2021, the tree is in good condition, but it is threatened by real estate speculation. Another real estate project is planned for the historic park of the Napoleon III villa built by Charles Schacher. Both projects are controversial and have aroused local opposition.

== Personalities ==
- American painter Abigail May Alcott Nieriker lived here until her death.
- French opera singer Émilie Ambre lived on an estate in Meudon, bought for her by her then-lover William III of the Netherlands in 1877.
- Artists Jean Arp and Sophie Taeuber-Arp were residents here from 1929 to 1940. Their neighbours were the artist and architect Theo van Doesburg and his wife, Nelly.
- Embryologist Édouard-Gérard Balbiani (1823–1899) died in Meudon.
- The 20th-century French lawyer and Islamologist Georges-Henri Bousquet (1900–1978) was born in Meudon.
- Louis-Ferdinand Céline lived here until his death, and is buried in Cimetière Longs Réages, Bas Meudon.
- Gregoire Defrel, footballer
- Madame de Pompadour lived in the Château de Bellevue, built for her by Louis XV in 1750; it was demolished in 1823.
- Lorenzo Callegari, footballer
- Souleymane Doukara, footballer
- Marcel Dupré, perhaps the most famous French organist of the 20th century, lived and worked in Meudon. He transformed his home into a small concert hall; the current owners of the home still hold public concerts there.
- Nicolas Isimat-Mirin, footballer
- Welsh painter Gwen John lived in Meudon from 1911 until just before her death in 1939.
- Argeline Buise, the model for Gwen John's painting The Pilgrim (1920) was a resident of Meudon. Gwen painted her "again and again"
- Former French prime minister Lionel Jospin was born in Meudon.
- Joseph P. Kennedy Jr, the son of the U.S. Ambassador in London, came to Meudon in 1939. During his short stay, he fell in Love with Aimée de Heeren, a Brazilian Secret Service agent who had secret documents from Germany. De Heeren loved the "Cedre Imperial Meudon" - a centuries old cedar tree full of legends - and showed it to Kennedy. Their love story in Meudon had an impact on World War II, as Kennedy helped Aimée to influence President Franklin D. Roosevelt, who initially wanted to stay out of the conflict.
- Photographer André Kertész took a famous photo of the train viaduct in Meudon.
- Mathematician Charle-Michel Marle, born in 1934, has lived in Meudon since 1970.
- Philosopher Jean-Luc Marion was born in Meudon in 1946.
- Artist Jean Metzinger lived and worked in Meudon from around 1911, during some of the crucial years of Cubism.
- George Simeon Papadopoulos, OBE, Professor of History, Dep. Director of Education Department of OECD (1925–2012)
- French actress and model Clémence Poésy attended the bilingual alternative school La Source, Meudon, and is best known for her portrayal of Fleur Delacour in the Harry Potter films.
- The town has a monument to Rabelais, who died here as canon of Meudon, where he held the benefice from 1551 to 1552.
- Art historian and curator Jean Robiquet was born in Meudon on 6 July 1874.
- Sculptor Auguste Rodin's villa "des Brillants", now a museum of his art, is located here, as is his grave.
- Jean-Paul Sartre grew up at his maternal grandfather's house in Meudon, as recounted in his memoir The Words.
- Adama Soumare, footballer
- Grand Duke Boris Vladimirovich of Russia lived in exile in Château Sans-Souci (in Bellevue) from 1920.
- German composer Richard Wagner was a resident (No. 27 Av. du Château), and composed The Flying Dutchman there.

== See also ==
- Communes of the Hauts-de-Seine department
- A statue of François Rabelais by Georges Saupique stands in front of the Meudon town hall. François Rabelais was the parish priest of Meudon from 1551 to 1553
- Château de Meudon
