= Hôtel de Ville, Meudon =

Town hall in Meudon, France

Hôtel de Ville
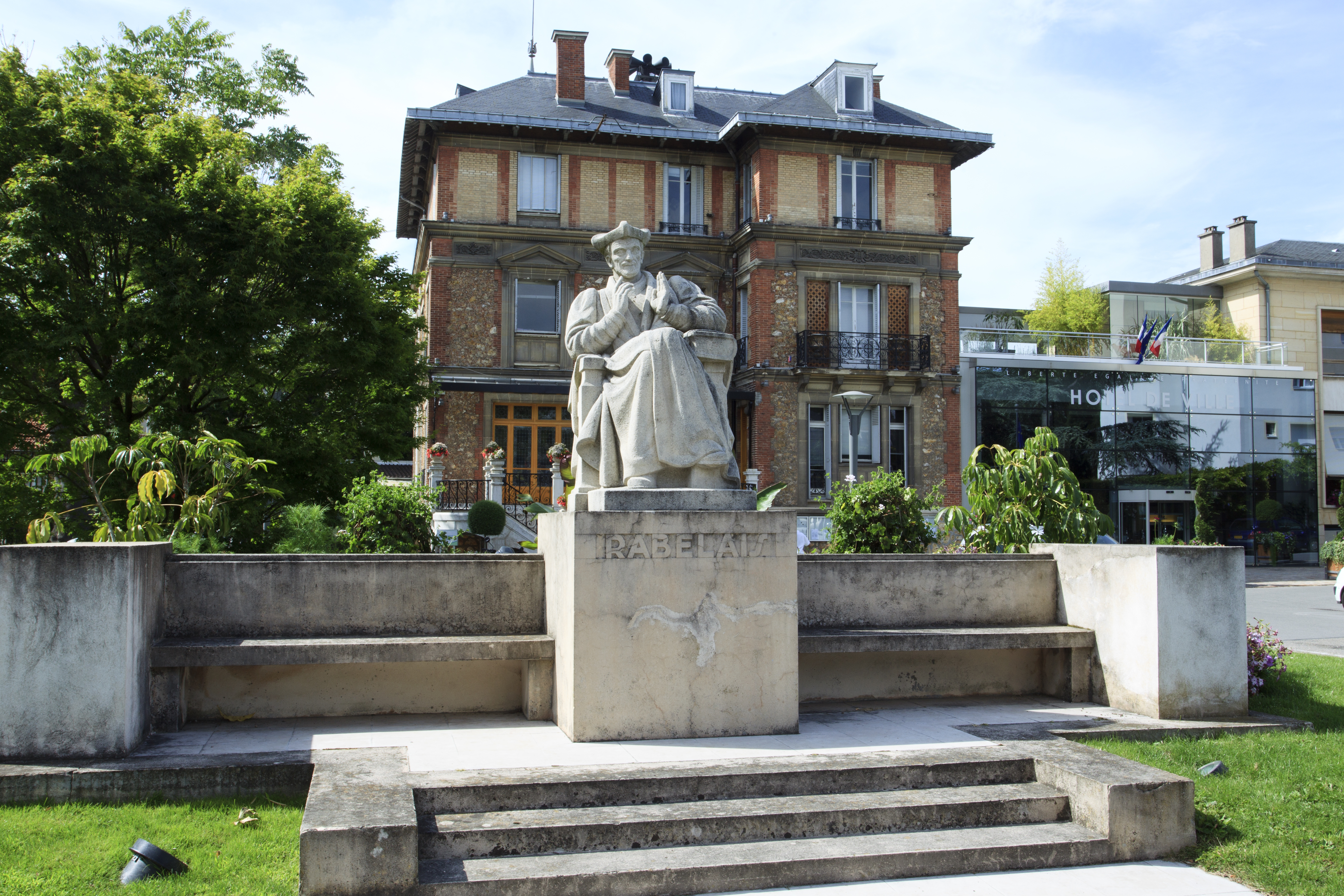
- The main frontage of the Hôtel de Ville in July 2012
- Interactive map of the Hôtel de Ville area

General information
- Type: City hall
- Architectural style: Neoclassical style
- Location: Meudon, France
- Coordinates: 48.8130°N 2.2384°E
- Completed: 1888

Design and construction
- Architect: Sieu Larrieu

The Hôtel de Ville (French pronunciation: [otɛl də vil], City Hall) is a municipal building in Meudon, Hauts-de-Seine, in the southwestern suburbs of Paris, standing on Avenue Le Corbeiller. It has been included on the Inventaire général des monuments by the French Ministry of Culture since 1994.

== History ==
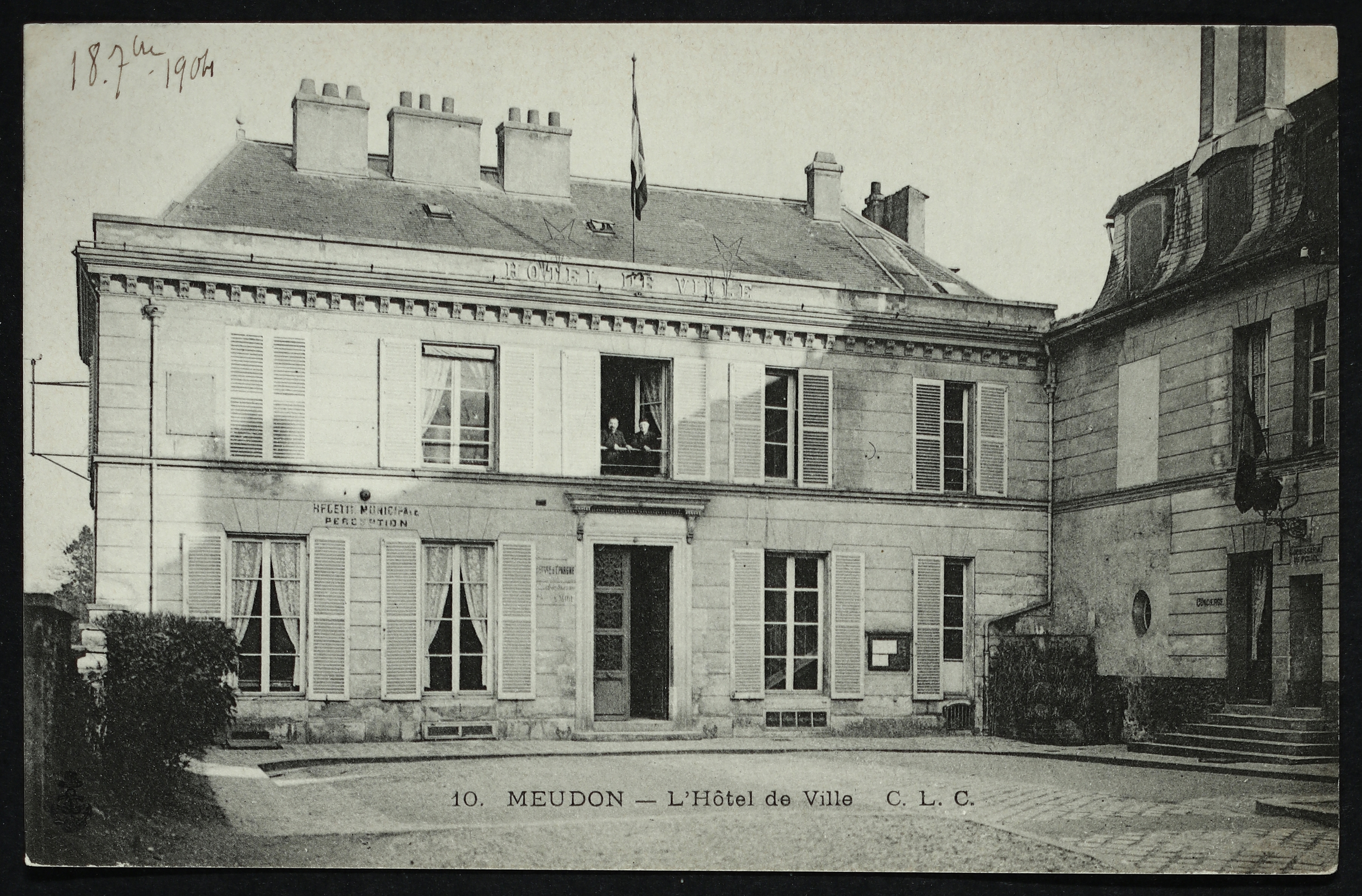
The old town hall acquired in 1853

In the Middle Ages, the members of the bailiwick held their meetings in the Ferme des Moines (Monks' Farm) on Rue Terre-Neuve and later in the Hôtel Bellou on Rue des Princes (now Rue de la République). Then, in the 18th century, members of the town council met either in the Church of Saint-Martin or in the Château de Meudon.

After the French Revolution, a Maison Commune was established on Rue de l'Égalité. This arrangement continued until 1853, when the council decided to acquire the property of the former mayor, Antoine Banès, on Rue des Princes (now Rue de la République). The design involved a main frontage of five bays, with an additional wing projected forward on the right, both facing onto a courtyard. The central bay featured a square headed doorway with a cornice. The other bays were fenestrated by casement windows with shutters on both floors and, at roof level, there was a modillioned cornice. The old town hall was sold in 1929 and demolished in 1965, and the site was subsequently occupied by a Monoprix supermarket.

In the early 20th century, after finding the old town hall inadequate, the council decided to find a more substantial municipal building. After considering various alternatives, they decided to acquire the former home of another former mayor, Louis Aimé Le Corbeiller. Construction of the house had started in 1884. It was designed by Sieu Larrieu in the neoclassical style, built in flint with red brick detailing and was completed in 1888. The design involved a main frontage of three bays facing onto Avenue Le Corbeiller with the right-hand bay projected forward. The left-hand section of two bays featured a forestair leading up to a veranda with a wide door on the left and a smaller door on the right. The left-hand section was fenestrated by casement windows with triangular pediments on the first floor and by plain casement windows on the second floor. The right-hand bay was fenestrated by tri-partite windows on the first two floors and by a single casement window on the second floor. After Le Corbeiller died in 1921, the council acquired the house for use as a town hall. After conversion for municipal purposes, the principal rooms included the Salle des Mariages (wedding room), which featured a copy of a bust of Marianne by the sculptor, Auguste Rodin.

In June 1940, early in the Second World War, an ortskommandantur (military command post) was established by German troops in the town hall. After the bombing of the Renault factory at Île Seguin, just to the north of the town centre, by the United States Air Force in April 1943, a procession set out from the town hall to the Church of Saint-Martin to commemorate the lives of local people who had died in the raids. Then, on 24 August 1944, the head of the local Liberation Committee, Alfred Tribert, took possession of the town hall. This was two days before the liberation of the town by the French 2nd Armoured Division, commanded by General Philippe Leclerc, on 26 August 1944.

A statue by the sculptor, Georges Saupique, depicting the priest, François Rabelais, who served as a curate in the town in the mid-16th century, was erected in front of the town hall in June 1946. A 10-bay extension block to the northeast, and a glass entrance block with a revolving door, which connected the house to the new extension block, were completed in 1966.

== Sources ==
- Larghero, Denis; Belaïd, Saïda (2021). "Meudon pendant la Seconde Guerre Mondiale" (PDF). Municipal Archives of Meudon.
