= Meudon Viaduct =

Historic railway viaduct in Meudon, France

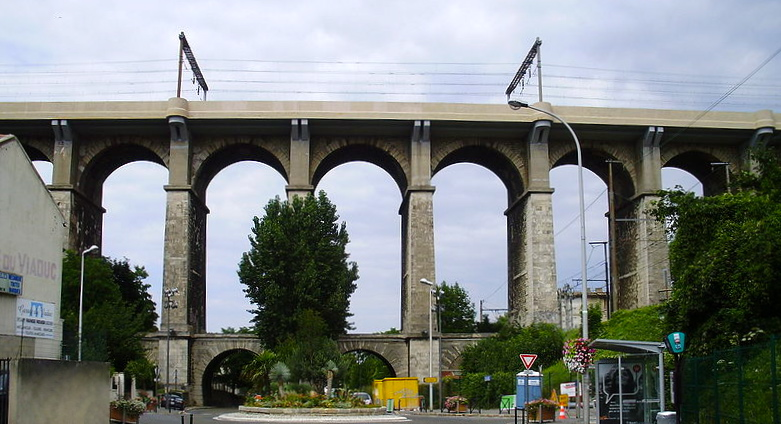
- Coordinates: 48°48′49″N 2°14′48″E
- Carries: Railway
- Crosses: Valley of the Ru d'Arthelon
- Locale: Meudon, Hauts-de-Seine, France

Characteristics
- Design: Arch bridge
- Material: Masonry
- Total length: 142.7 m (468 ft)

Location
- Interactive map of Meudon Viaduct

The Meudon Viaduct, originally known as the Val-Fleury Viaduct and also called Hélène Bridge, is located in the town of Meudon in the Hauts-de-Seine department of France.

Constructed as part of the railway line connecting Paris-Montparnasse to Versailles-Chantiers station, the viaduct spans the valley of the Ru d'Arthelon, separating the hills of Meudon from those of Clamart. One of its arches accommodates the Invalides–Versailles-Rive-Gauche line, which opened in this section in the early 1900s and extends south toward Meudon-Val-Fleury station and beyond to Versailles-Château-Rive-Gauche station.

This stone or masonry bridge stretches 142.7 metres (468 ft) in length and features seven spans. As of 2010, it holds the distinction of being the oldest railway viaduct still in operation in France.

== History ==
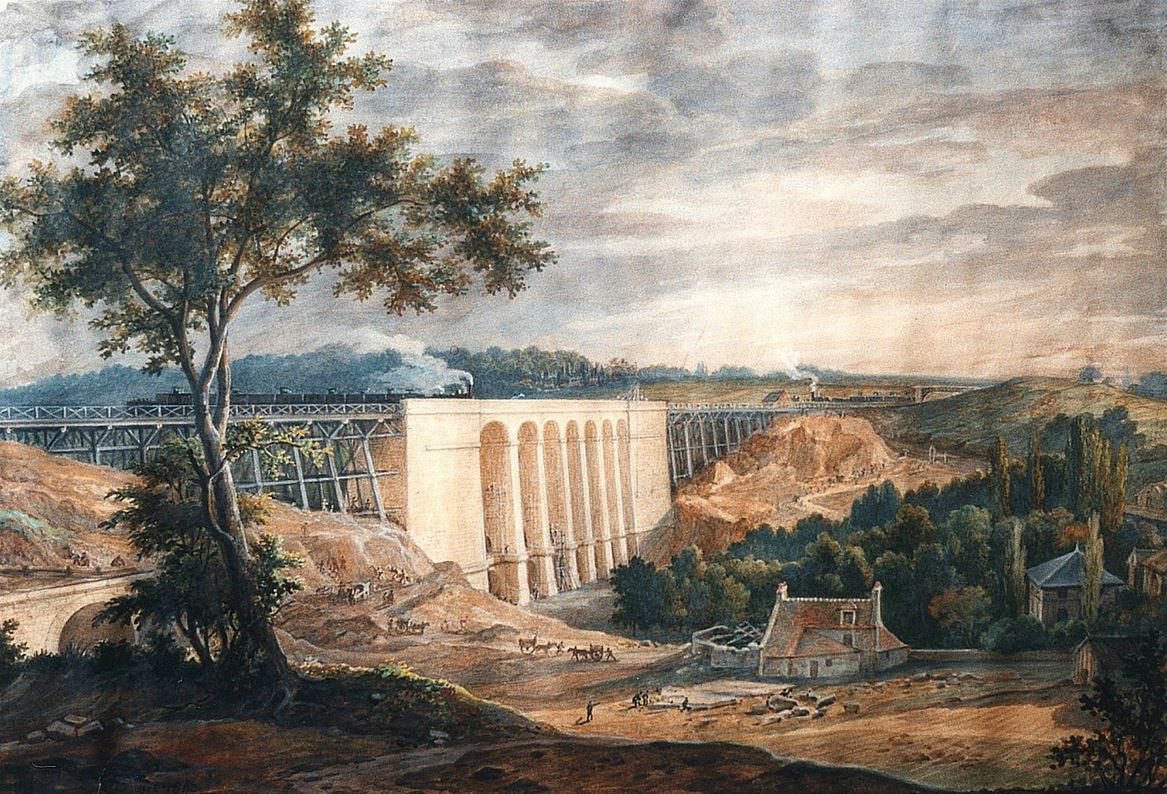
Construction of the Val-Fleury Viaduct (Meudon) in 1840.

=== 19th century ===
After extensive studies, a design by the Polonceau-Seguin group was selected, with Antoine-Rémy Polonceau as the engineer, Marc Seguin and his brothers as architects, and Payen as the inspector.

The ambitious project aimed to overcome the natural barrier of the valley with a grand viaduct. The foundation stone was laid on October 1, 1838, by the Duke of Orléans. On September 9, 1840, the railway structure was inaugurated by Louis Philippe I, King of the French—though he reportedly did not enjoy train travel. The viaduct was later named Hélène Bridge in honor of Hélène de Mecklembourg-Schwerin, Duchess of Orléans and wife of the heir, Ferdinand-Philippe d'Orléans. Despite local opposition in Meudon, construction was completed by September 1840, and commercial operations began on November 10, 1840.

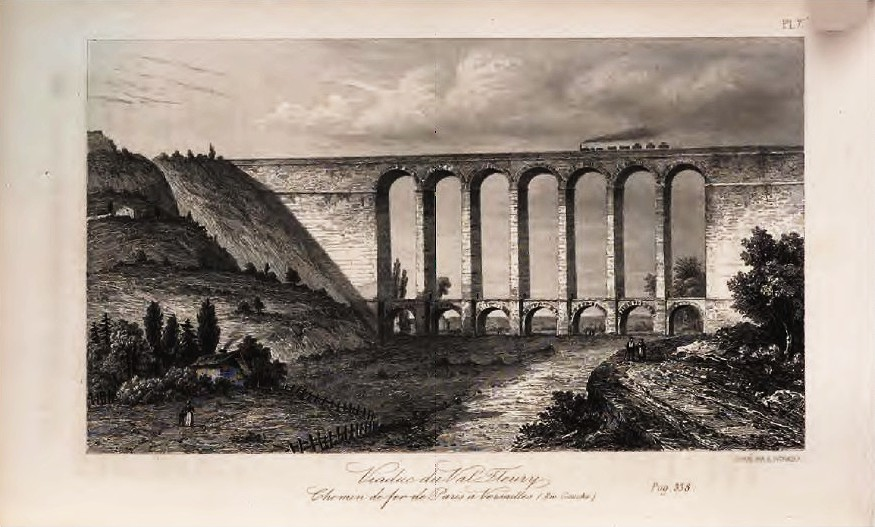
The Meudon Viaduct upon its opening in 1840. Note that the proportions in this drawing are not accurate to reality.

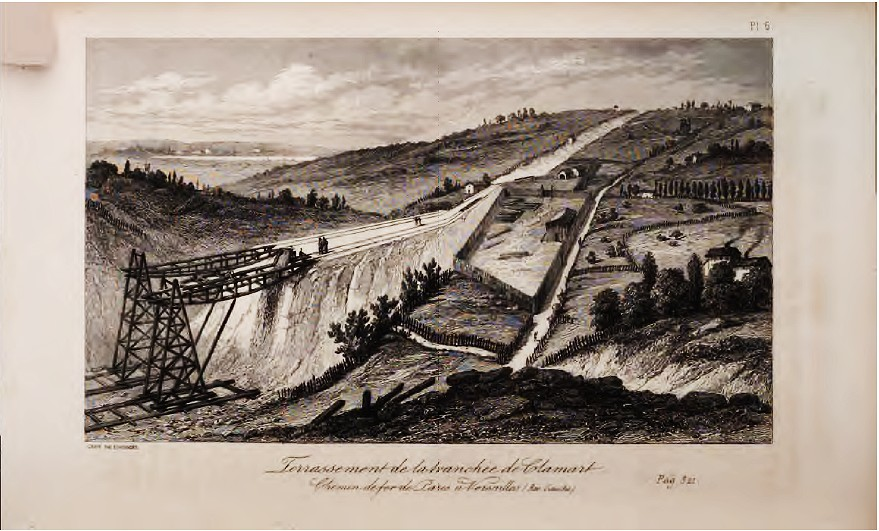
The Clamart cutting near the viaduct, with excavation work in 1840.

In Voyage pittoresque sur le chemin de fer de Paris à Versailles, the viaduct is described as follows:

This viaduct, as remarkable for the elegance of its architecture as for the striking scale of its proportions, consists of two tiers of superimposed arches, each tier comprising seven arches. The lower arches have an opening of 7 metres (23 ft) between the abutments and a height of 7 metres (23 ft) to the keystone. The upper arches feature a 10 metres (33 ft) opening and a keystone height of 20 metres (66 ft). The piers separating the arches are 3 metres (9.8 ft) thick. The viaduct, flanked by abutments, has a total length of 142.7 metres (468 ft). Its height above ground reaches 36 metres (118 ft), though this is reduced to an apparent 31 metres (102 ft) due to an embankment leveling the valley transversely. The foundation stone of this magnificent monument—reminiscent of the great Roman aqueducts and named Hélène Bridge in honor of the Duchess of Orléans—was laid on October 1, 1838, in the presence of notable figures including Auguste Léo (administrator-general and banker), Payen and Perdonnet (chief engineers), Lieutenant-General Jacqueminot, the Marquis de Dreux Brézé (peer of France), deputies Teste and Benoît Fould, Achille Fould, the Baron de Mecklembourg, Baron Philippe-François-Didier Usquin (Versailles municipal councilor), Count Perthuis (staff captain), and Talabot, all members of the board of the Paris-to-Versailles Left Bank Railway Company.

Special attention was paid to the viaduct's foundations, which xtend between 20 and 25 metres (66 and 82 ft) underground to reach the chalk layer, significantly increasing the project's cost.

The arrival of the railway transformed Meudon. Bellevue, a residential area developed around 1824, expanded rapidly. The railway's route was partly designed to serve this emerging district, making it easier for Parisians—who already appreciated the village's charm—to visit on Sundays or settle there. Just a few hundred meters from the viaduct, the Meudon rail disaster occurred on May 8, 1842.

=== 20th century ===
Nearly a century later, in 1936, the viaduct underwent significant modernization during the doubling oef the railway tracks. Its silhouette was subtly altered with reinforcements to the abutments and piers, and a cantilever deck was added to accommodate the expansion.

=== 21st century ===
At the request of Meudon’s municipality, which sought to highlight its heritage, the Communauté d'agglomération Arc de Seine illuminated the Hélène Bridge to enhance its visibility and prominence.

== Gallery ==
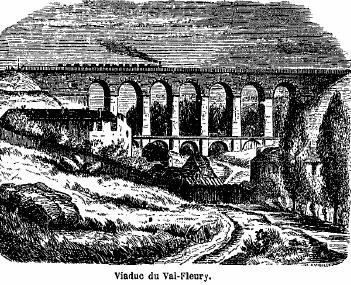
Meudon Viaduct
(19th-century engraving)

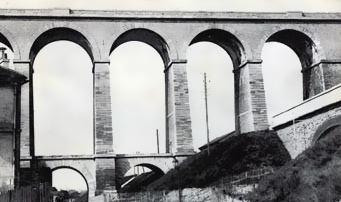
Meudon Viaduct in the early 20th century
(the Invalides line is visible to the right)

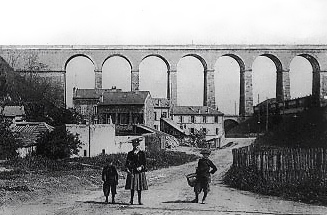
Meudon Viaduct at the end of the 19th or early 20th century

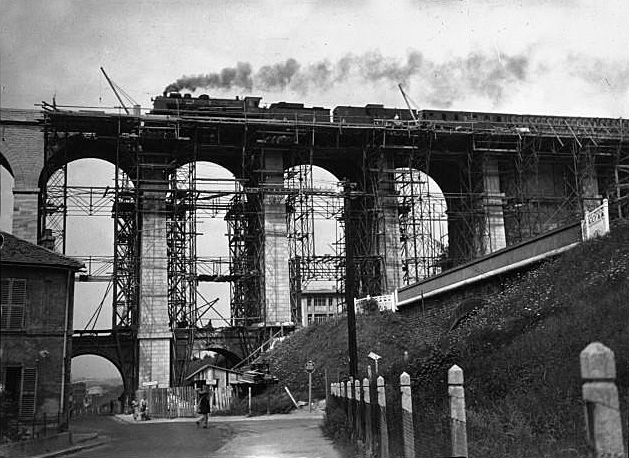
Modifications under the Marquet Plan in 1935.

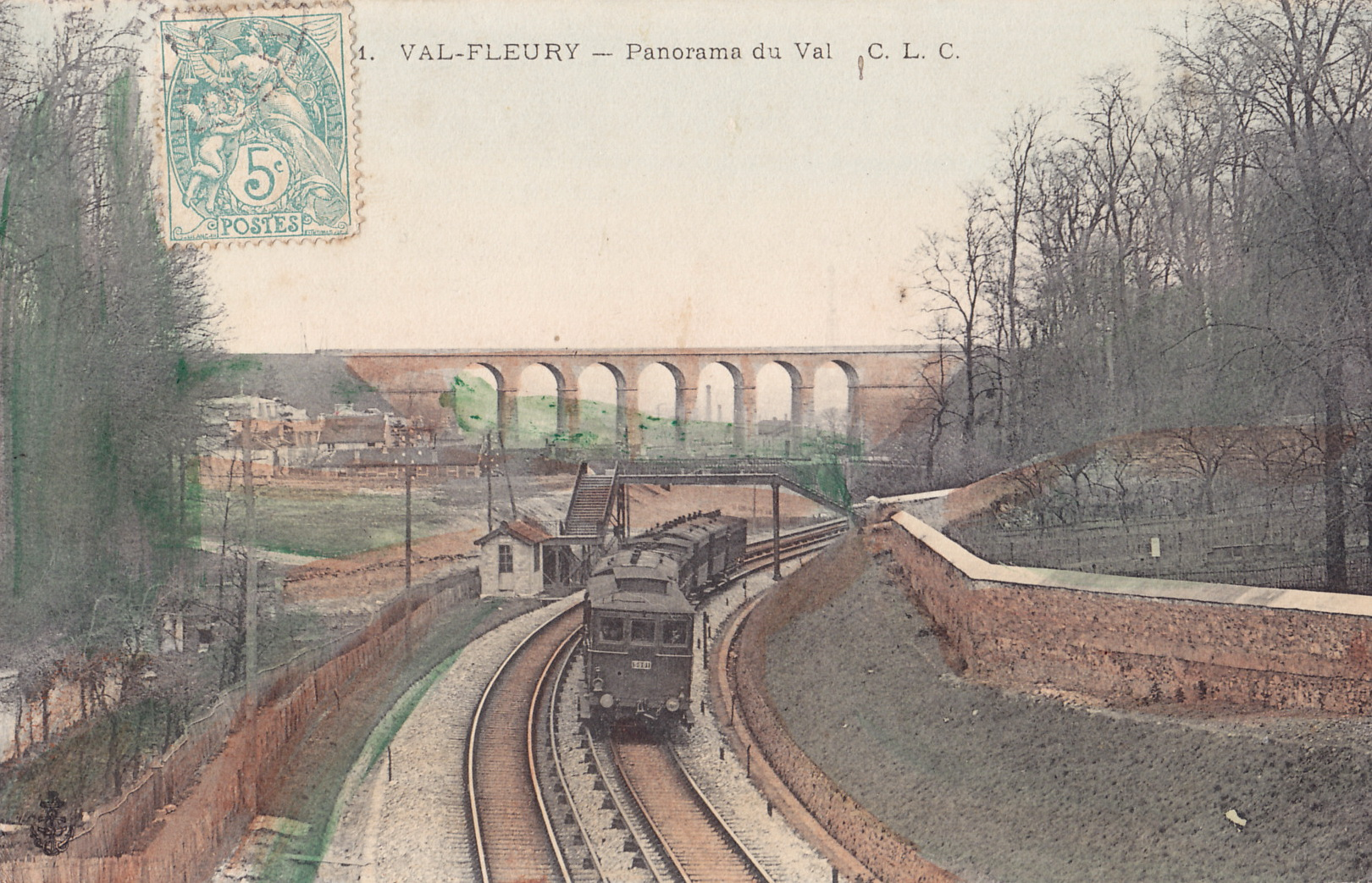
View of the viaduct from the Invalides–Versailles-Rive-Gauche line in the early 20th century.

== See also ==
- Meudon
- Hauts-de-Seine

== Bibliography ==
- En chemin de fer de Paris à Versailles par la rive gauche, de 1840 à nos jours [By Railway from Paris to Versailles via the Left Bank, from 1840 to the Present] (Exhibition catalog) (in French). Meudon: Musée d'Art et d'Histoire de Meudon. 1990.
