= La Vie du Rail =

- Status: Active
- Founded: 1952
- Founder: SNCF
- Country of origin: France
- Headquarters location: Auray, Brittany
- Publication types: La Vie du Rail magazine Ville, rail & transports Rail Passion
- Nonfiction topics: Rail transport
- Official website: www.vdr-multimedia.com

La Vie du Rail (English: Railway Life) is a French publishing group headquartered in Auray, which specialises in magazines and books about rail transport, and transport more generally. The editor-in-chief is Vincent Lalu.

It was started in 1952 as an in-house publication of the SNCF, taking over the role played by Notre Métier ("Our trade") since 1938. In 1965 it became a weekly paid-for magazine independent of the SNCF, which retains a minority share in the company. The name then passed to the special-interest publishing house.

== Titles ==
Since 2002, so as to diversify its customer base, la Vie du Rail has split its coverage and publishes:

- La Vie du Rail magazine, generalist weekly centring on rail transport with an average circulation of over 100,000.
- Ville, rail & transports ("Town, rail & transport"): Initially weekly and titled Rail & Transport, it was then published every two weeks as Ville & transports magazine. In 2009 it merged with La Vie du rail international. (Note: First issue after the merger: Ville, rail & transports 469, 8 April 2009.) It is aimed at those working in the transport sector.
- Historail, quarterly, specialising in rail history.
- Rail Passion, approximately 100-page monthly with an average circulation of 40,000 copies.

== Commercial structure ==
Shares in the company are split between:

- Vincent Lalu et Associés, 71%
- SNCF, 10%
- Société du personnel de La Vie du Rail, 5%
- Groupe La Vie-Le Monde, 5%
- Groupe Ouest-France, 5%
- Mutuelle d'assurance des artisans de France, 4%.

== See also ==
- List of railroad-related periodicals
