= Transilien Line N =

Suburban rail service around Paris

Line N

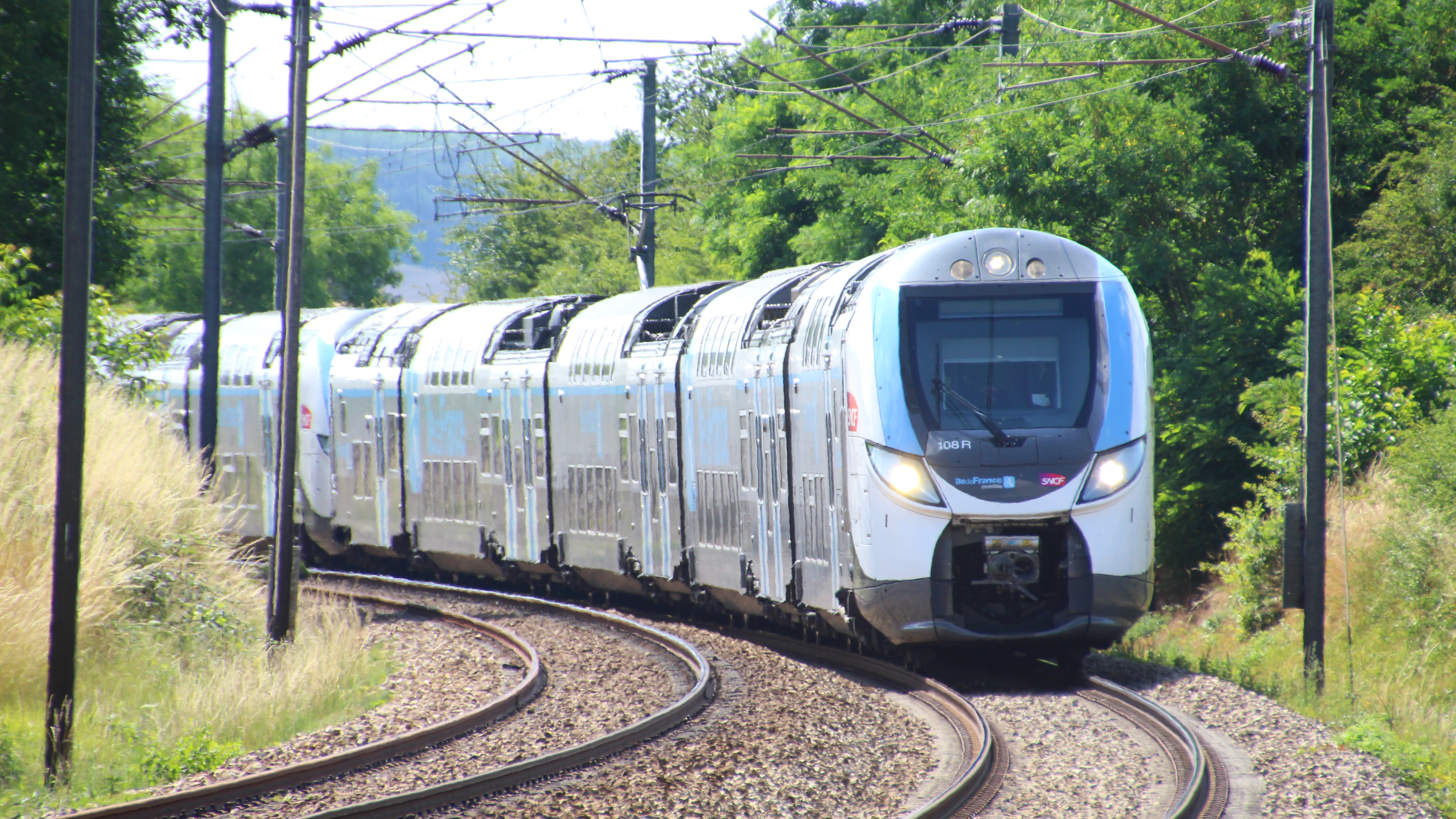
- Regio 2N (Class Z 57000) on the Saint-Cyr to Surdon line

Overview
- Termini: Paris-Montparnasse; Dreux Mantes-la-Jolie Rambouillet
- Stations: 35

Service
- Type: Commuter rail
- System: Transilien
- Operator: SNCF
- Rolling stock: Z8800, Z57000
- Daily ridership: 117,000

History
- Opened: 10 September 1840 (first sections); 31 December 2004 (recreated as Line N)

Technical
- Line length: 117 km (73 mi)
- Track gauge: 1,435 mm (4 ft 8 1/2 in)
Route map

Transilien Line N is a railway line of the Paris Transilien suburban rail network operated by the SNCF. The trains on this line travel between Gare Montparnasse in Paris and the west of Île-de-France region, with termini in Rambouillet, Dreux and Mantes-la-Jolie on a total of 117 km (75 mi). The line has a total of 117,000 passengers per weekday. Passenger service started in 2004.

== Rolling stock ==
As of October 2022, the following trains are operated on the line: SNCF Class Z 57000 (Regio 2N), and occasionally SNCF Class Z 8800.

Former rolling stock include SNCF Class Z 5300, which only ran on sections electrified with 1500 V direct current, SNCF Class BB 27300 and BB 7600 (SNCF Class BB 7200 modified, since 2012, also only on sections electrified with 1500 V direct current) with voiture de banlieue à 2 niveaux coaches, which are currently being withdrawn alongside Z 8800 material.

== List of stations ==
=== Rambouillet Line ===
Transilien Paris - Montparnasse routes map

This line, according to SNCF, will travel from start to the terminus in 1 hour, and operates as per this route, on the Paris–Brest railway:

- Gare Montparnasse
- Vanves–Malakoff station
- Clamart station
- Meudon station
- Bellevue station
- Sèvres-Rive-Gauche station
- Chaville-Rive-Gauche station
- Viroflay-Rive-Gauche station
- Versailles-Chantiers station
- Saint-Cyr station
- Saint-Quentin-en-Yvelines–Montigny-le-Bretonneux station
- Trappes station
- La Verrière station
- Coignières station
- Les Essarts-le-Roi station
- Le Perray station
- Rambouillet station

This line is electrified using a 1500 V direct current.

=== Dreux Line ===
This line according to SNCF will get from start to terminus in 1hr, and operates as per this route, on the Paris–Brest railway up to Saint-Cyr, then on the ligne de Saint-Cyr à Surdon:

- same route as the Rambouillet line between Paris-Montparnasse and Saint-Cyr
- Fontenay-le-Fleury station
- Villepreux–Les-Clayes station
- Plaisir–Les-Clayes station
- Plaisir–Grignon station
- Villiers–Neauphle–Pontchartrain station
- Montfort-l'Amaury–Méré station
- Garancières–La Queue station
- Orgerus–Béhoust station
- Tacoignières–Richebourg station
- Houdan station

Leave Île-de-France

- Marchezais–Broué station
- Dreux station

This line is electrified using a 1500 V direct current between the Montparnasse station and the Plaisir-Grignon station, and a 25000 V alternating current elsewhere.

=== Mantes-la-Jolie Line ===
- same route as the Dreux line between Paris-Montparnasse and Plaisir - Grignon, on the Paris–Brest railway up to Saint-Cyr, then on the ligne de Saint-Cyr à Surdon up to Plaisir, then on the ligne de Plaisir - Grignon à Épône - Mézières up to Épône - Méziéres, and finally on the Paris–Le Havre railway:
- Beynes station
- Mareil-sur-Mauldre station
- Maule station
- Nézel–Aulnay station
- Épône–Mézières station
- Mantes-la-Jolie station

This line is electrified using a 1500 V direct current between the Montparnasse station and the Plaisir-Grignon station, and a 25000 V alternating current elsewhere.

== Names of service ==
Like other Transilien lines the name of service consists of four letters, but is not always displayed on trains, but it can be seen on passenger information display systems.

Taking GEPU (which is for a train that runs express between Paris-Montparnasse and Sèvres-Rive-Gauche then stops all stations to Plaisir-Grignon) as an example, the table describes how names of services are structured.

Illustration	Explanation
GEPU	The first letter is the destination of the train, which is typically the first letter of the station's name. If a name of service begins with the letter P, this indicates a train to Paris Montparnasse. In this example, the first letter is a G, so the train terminates at Plaisir-Grignon.
GEPU	The second letter indicates whether the train will call at all stations, or not. An O in this position indicates an all stops train, with an E indicating an express between Paris-Montparnasse and Sèvres-Rive-Gauche, an A indicating an express between Paris-Montparnasse and Versailles-Chantiers, and an I indicating an express between Paris-Montparnasse and Viroflay-Rive-Gauche. Continuing with the example, the second letter of the four is an E, therefore the train runs express between Paris-Montparnasse and Sèvres-Rive-Gauche.
GEPU	The third letter is the train's origin. In this example, letter P is present in this position, so the train originates at Paris-Montparnasse.
GEPU	The fourth letter has four options: A, I, O and U. The fourth letter might have different meanings, but it creates a pronounceable code. In this example, the fourth letter is a U.

There is also codes given to Chartres TER services, which are PACE towards Paris-Montparnasse, and CAPO towards Chartres.

== See also ==
- List of Transilien stations
