= Dreux station =

Railway station in Eure-et-Loir, France

Coordinates: 48°43′53″N 1°22′12″E

Dreux
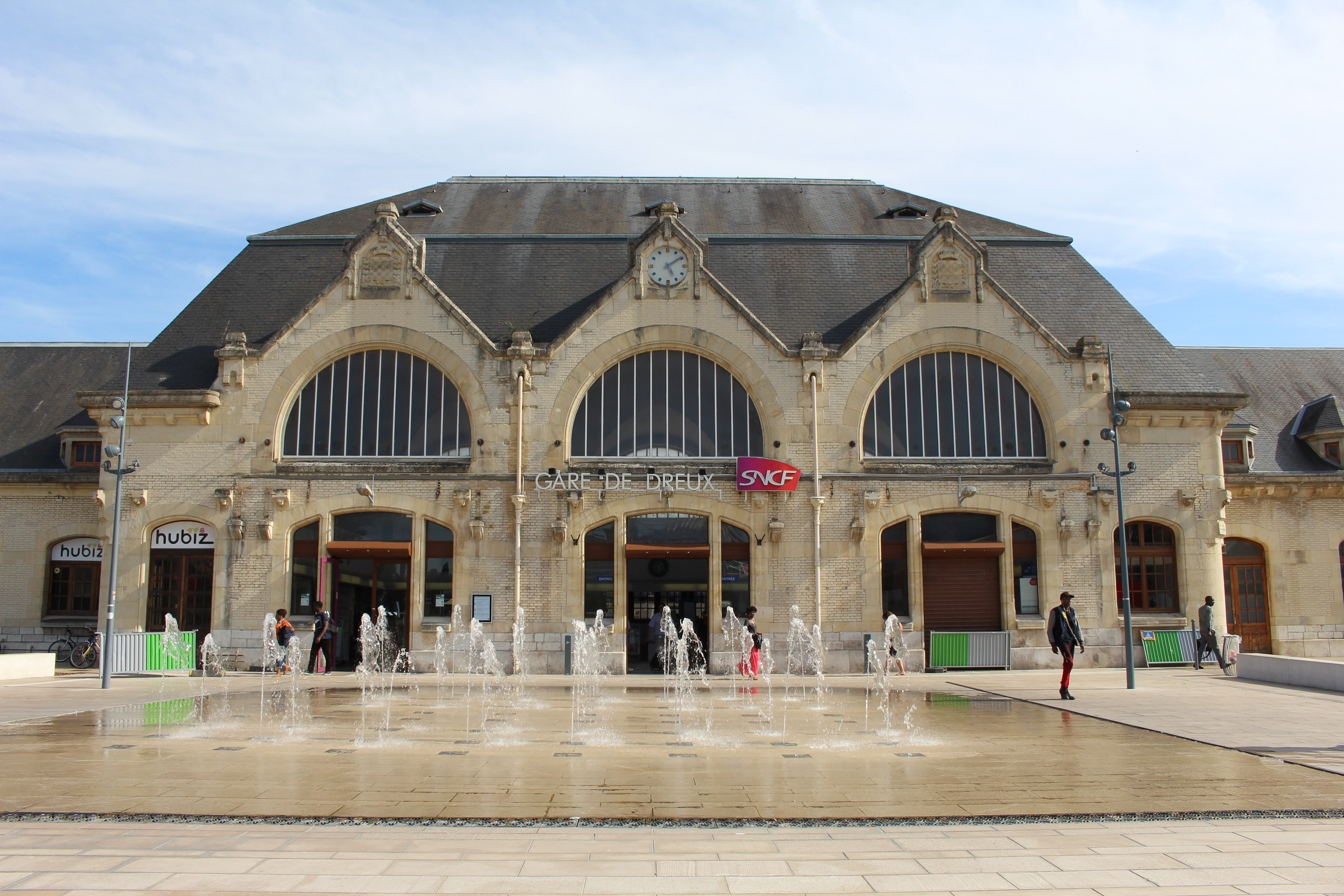

General information
- Location: Place Pierre-Semard; 28100 Dreux; Eure-et-Loir; France
- Owner: SNCF
- Operator: SNCF

Construction
- Architect: Paul Genuys

Other information
- Station code: 87393488

History
- Opened: 15 June 1864

Passengers
- 2024: 2,192,967
Location

Gare de Dreux is a railway station serving the town Dreux, Eure-et-Loir department, northwestern France.

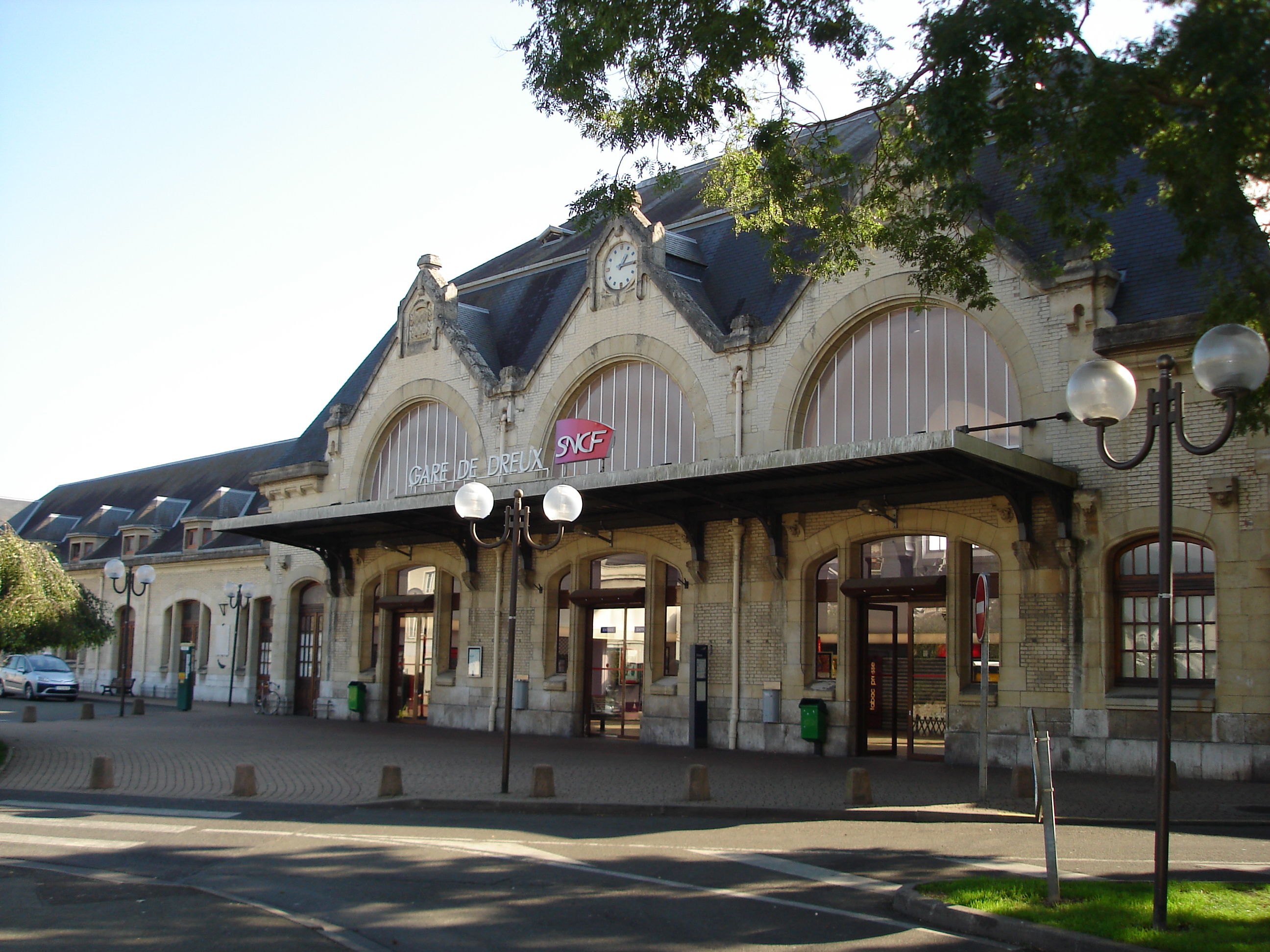
Dreux railway station prior to the renovation of Place Pierre-Semard.

== Services ==
The station is served by regional trains to Argentan, Paris and Granville.

Preceding station	TER Normandie	Following station
Versailles-Chantiers towards Paris-Montparnasse	Krono	Nonancourt towards Granville
Preceding station	Transilien	Following station
Marchezais-Broué towards Paris-Montparnasse	Line N	Terminus
