= Rambouillet station =

Railway station in Rambouillet, France

Coordinates: 48°38′40″N 1°49′57″E

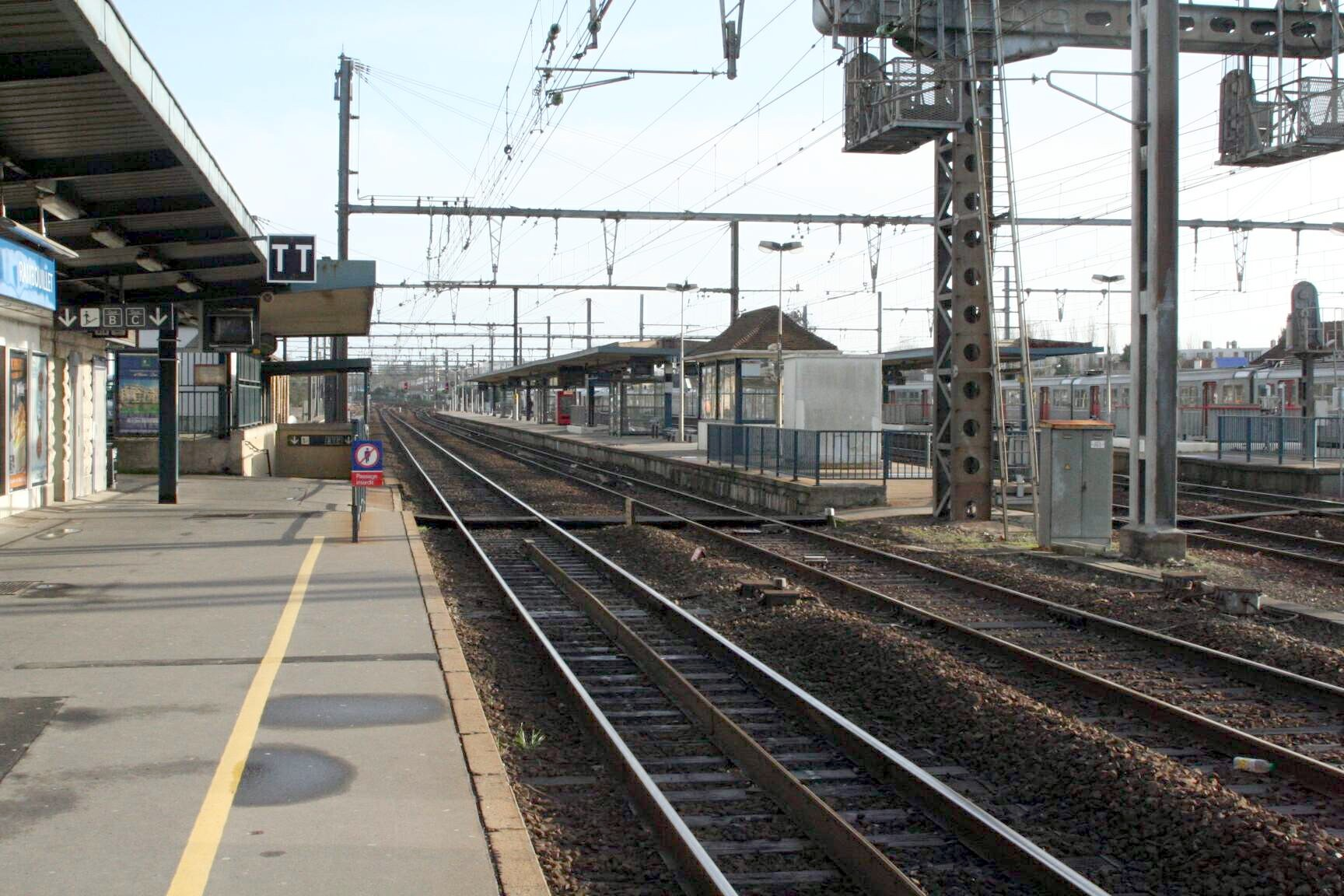
Platforms

Rambouillet (French: [ʁɑ̃bujɛ]) is a railway station serving Rambouillet, a southwestern suburb of Paris, France. It is on the Paris–Brest railway, leading from Paris-Montparnasse to Brest via Chartres, Nogent-le-Rotrou and Le Mans.

Preceding station	Le Réseau Rémi	Following station
Gazeran towards Le Mans	3.2	Versailles-Chantiers towards Paris-Montparnasse
Preceding station	Transilien	Following station
Terminus	Line N	Le Perray towards Paris-Montparnasse
