= Villaines station =

Railway station in Villaines-sous-Bois, France

Villaines
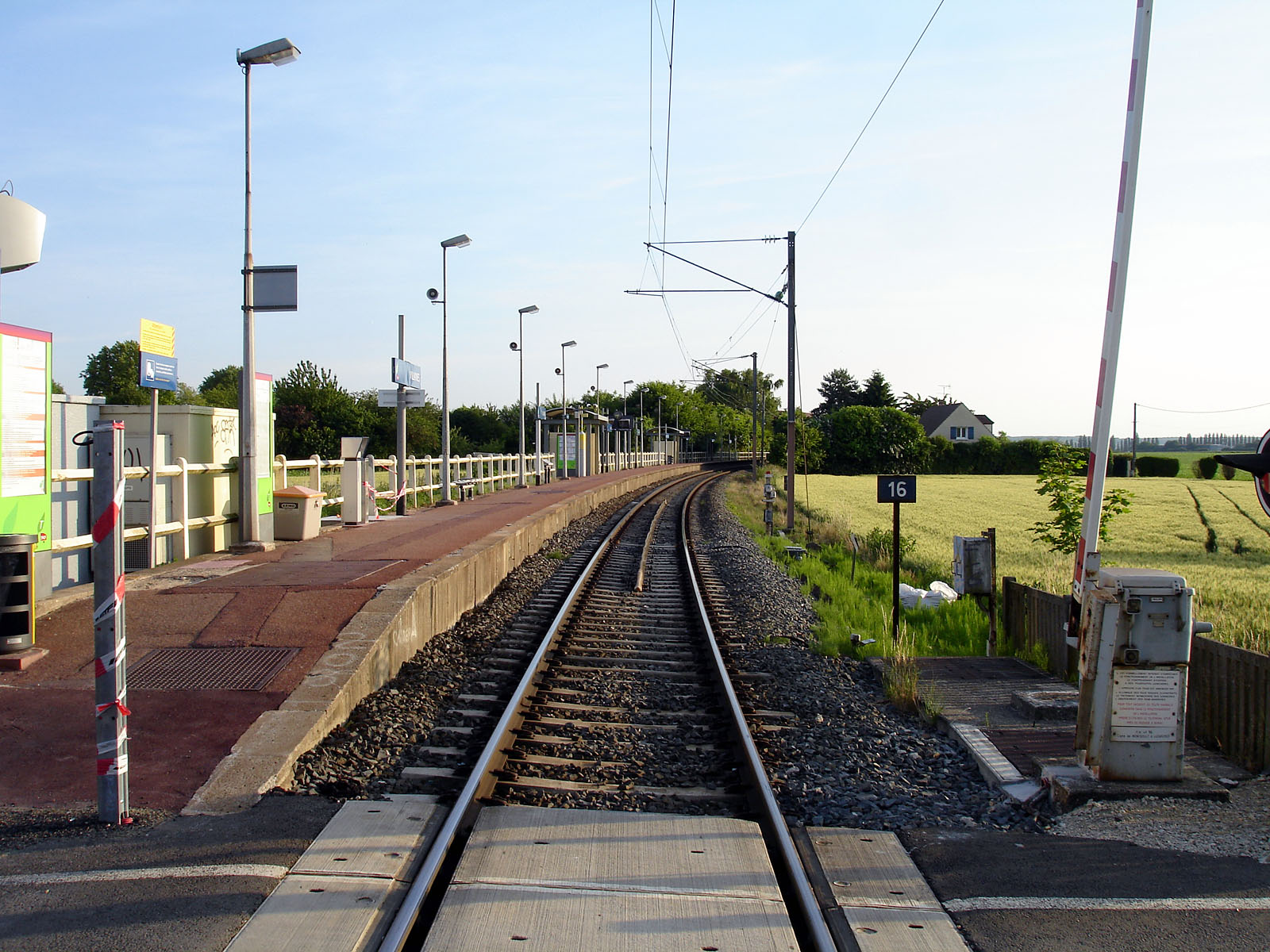
- Station looking toward Paris

General information
- Location: Villaines-sous-Bois, France
- Coordinates: 49°4′46″N 2°21′3″E
- Owner: SNCF
- Line: Montsoult-Maffliers–Luzarches railway
- Platforms: 1
- Tracks: 1

Other information
- Station code: 87272021
- Fare zone: 5

History
- Opened: 1 May 1880

Services
Preceding station	Transilien	Following station
Montsoult–Maffliers towards Paris-Nord	Line H	Belloy–Saint-Martin towards Luzarches
Location

Villaines is an unstaffed halt in Villaines-sous-Bois (Val-d'Oise department), France. It is on the Luzarches line. The station is served by the Transilien H trains from Paris to Luzarches. In 2002, the stop was used by fewer than 500 passengers per day.

== Bus routes ==
- CIF: 47
- Carianne: 002
