= Dammarie-lès-Lys =

- Commune
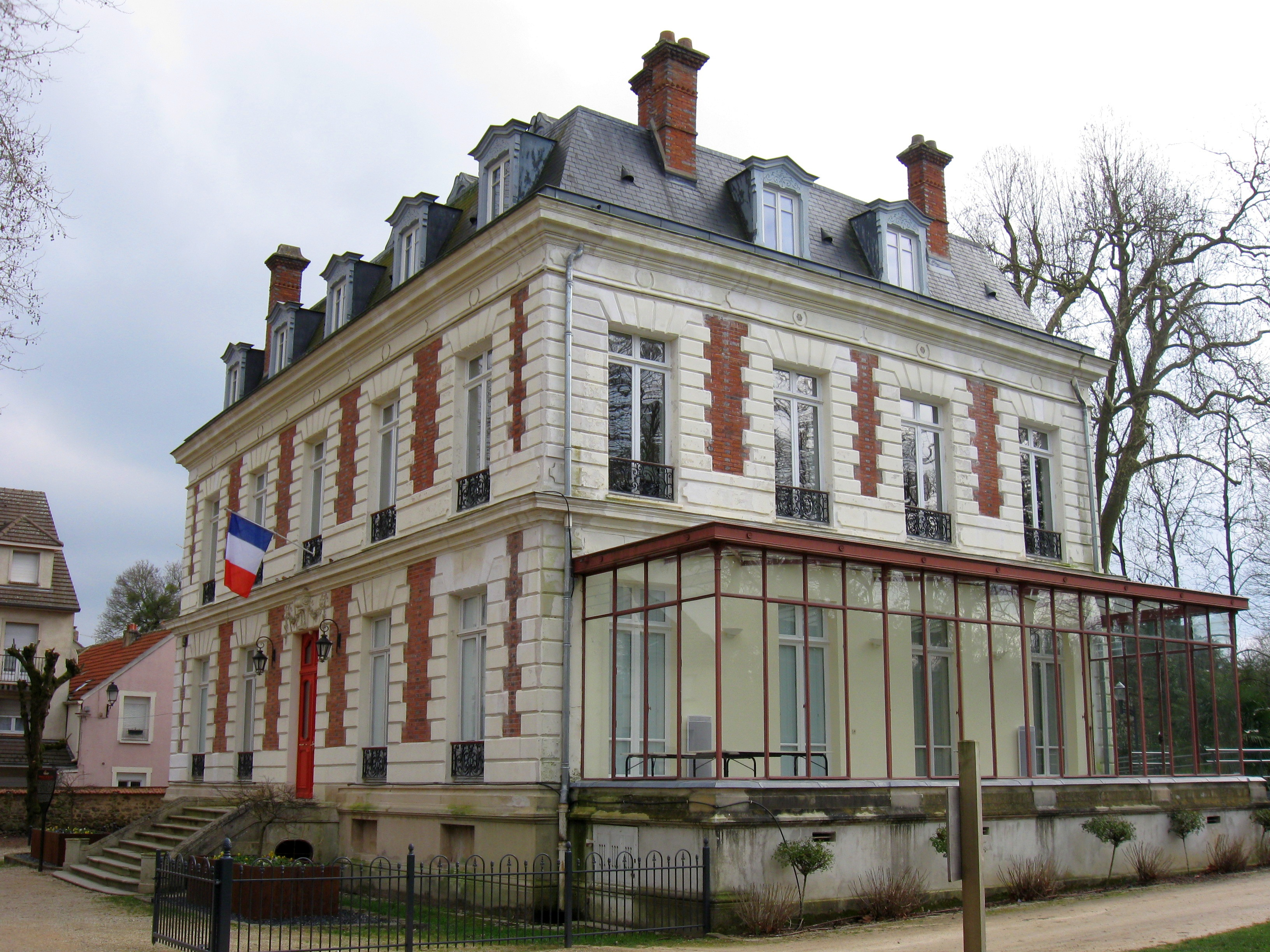
- The Château Soubiran which serves as the Hôtel de Ville

- Coat of arms
- Location of Dammarie-lès-Lys
- Location within France Location within Île-de-France (region)
- Coordinates: 48°31′04″N 2°38′25″E
- Country: France
- Region: Île-de-France
- Department: Seine-et-Marne
- Arrondissement: Melun
- Canton: Saint-Fargeau-Ponthierry
- Intercommunality: CA Melun Val de Seine

Government
  - Mayor (2020–2026): Gilles Battail
- Area^{1}: 10.24 km^{2} (3.95 sq mi)
- Highest elevation: 93 m (305 ft)
- Lowest elevation: 37 m (121 ft)
- Population (2023): 23,559
  - Density: 2,301/km^{2} (5,959/sq mi)
- Time zone: UTC+01:00 (CET)
  - Summer (DST): UTC+02:00 (CEST)
- INSEE/Postal code: 77152 /77190
- ^{1} French Land Register data, which excludes lakes, ponds, glaciers > 1 km^{2} (0.386 sq mi or 247 acres) and river estuaries.

Dammarie-lès-Lys (French pronunciation: [damaʁi le lis]; officially Dammarie-les-Lys) is a commune in the south-eastern suburbs of Paris, France. It is located in the Seine-et-Marne department in the Île-de-France region 43.3 km (26.9 mi) from the center of Paris.

== History ==
During the French Revolution, Dammarie-lès-Lys (meaning "Dammarie near the [Royal Abbaye of] Lys") was temporarily renamed Dammarie-les-Fontaines (meaning "Dammarie the fountains") due to the royal symbolism of the fleurs de lis and the religious connotation of the name.

Dammarie-les-Lys existed (in a different form) beforehand but is mentioned in the tenth century. The village consisted of several hamlets: Dammarie-les-Lys, and Farcy Vosves-lès-Lys. The city contains the ruins of the Royal Abbey of Lys, Cistercian abbey for women, founded in 1251 by Blanche of Castile and Saint Louis. Its construction began in 1244 and ended around 1253 on a former vineyard parcel. In 1252, Blanche of Castile y made his last alms. The abbey was sacked by the revolutionaries to 1793. Sold in 1797, it continued to decay despite the various restorations undertaken.

Dammarie-les-Lys definitely enter the twentieth century with the emergence of the industry on its land.

The Delatre & Frouard foundry was built in 1911 by Pierre Broker and inaugurated in 1917. It was located at the site of the former foundry Frébault. In 1949 she changed into the mill. Final closure intervened in 1965. This company is born a set of houses built after World War II in 1919.

The Château Soubiran, which serves as the Hôtel de Ville, was completed in around 1850.

Confectionery and chocolate company Jacquin was inaugurated in 1872. It was located on Avenue de Chailly. The company was sold to the Perrier group in 1962 and a corporate merger took place in 1968 with a move to Le Mee-sur-Seine in 1971. His final closure intervene in 1980.

The plant was built in 1927, though closed in 1996.

In 1959, a ministerial decree establishes the priority urbanized area (ZUP) of the Plaine du Lys 2359 homes are built from 1965 to 1973. Louis Arretche architect who officiated in the northern districts of Melun, is the Chief planner. It gathers today almost half of the inhabitants of the city. The first buildings are cantoned around the abbey and the site of the ancient cities of Frouard Delattre factory from 1972. Rather than rehabilitating the district mayor of the time preferred to build a set of buildings like the neighboring towns while the industrial sector was already in decline with the permanent closure of Delattre and foundries Frouard (± 800 pers.) in 1965, Ideal Standard (± 1200 people) in 1975 and the relocation of the confectionery Jacquin in 1971.

In 1997, the area of the Plaine du Lys experiencing violent riots following the death of a young resident (Abdelkader Bouziane) during a police intervention. In 2002, two other young men of the city, Xavier Dem and Mohamed Berrichi, died two days apart, were investigated by the police. Then, a long legal and media battle between the municipality and the association Bouge move followed in particular, which was the subject of a report on Canal + in the broadcast 90 minutes. Alternately OPHLM, then the town and its mayor Jean-Claude Mignon, were sentenced after legal action brought by the association Bouge moves.

== Demographics ==
Inhabitants of Dammarie-lès-Lys are called Dammariens in French.

Historical population

Year	Pop.	±% p.a.
1793	601	—
1800	677	+1.72%
1806	613	−1.64%
1821	719	+1.07%
1831	802	+1.10%
1836	880	+1.87%
1841	894	+0.32%
1846	882	−0.27%
1851	905	+0.52%
1856	936	+0.68%
1861	999	+1.31%
1866	1,097	+1.89%
1872	1,209	+1.63%
1876	1,219	+0.21%
1881	1,284	+1.04%
1886	1,447	+2.42%
1891	1,552	+1.41%
1896	1,683	+1.63%
1901	1,734	+0.60%

Year	Pop.	±% p.a.
1906	1,947	+2.34%
1911	2,191	+2.39%
1921	2,755	+2.32%
1926	3,441	+4.55%
1931	5,074	+8.08%
1936	4,893	−0.72%
1946	5,861	+1.82%
1954	7,057	+2.35%
1962	10,246	+4.77%
1968	12,057	+2.75%
1975	19,741	+7.30%
1982	19,794	+0.04%
1990	21,148	+0.83%
1999	20,659	−0.26%
2007	20,526	−0.08%
2012	20,892	+0.35%
2017	21,835	+0.89%
2023	23,559	+1.27%

Source: EHESS and INSEE (1968-2023)

== Transport ==
Dammarie-lès-Lys is served by Vosves station on the Transilien Paris – Lyon suburban rail line. It is also served by Melun station, which is an interchange between Paris RER line, Transilien, and several national rail lines. This station is located at the border between the communities of Dammarie-lès-Lys and Melun, on the Melun side of the border.

== Cultural heritage ==
Dammarie features the ruins of a typical Cistercian architecture abbey from the thirteenth century. It was destroyed during the Hundred Years War, rebuilt, and partly destroyed again during the French Revolution. This monument has been labeled Monument historique.

The Vives-Eaux Castle, situated in the South of the town, lodges the Star Academy France show.

== See also ==
- Communes of the Seine-et-Marne department
- Baron Barlatier de Mas, mayor of Dammarie-lès-Lys (1848–1874)
- Jean-Claude MIGNON, mayor (1986-2014)

== Twin towns and sister cities ==
Dammarie-lès-Lys is twinned with:

- Montebelluna, Italy, since 1987
- Tata, Hungary, since 1993
- Arcos de Valdevez, Portugal, since 1999
- Eppelheim, Germany, since 1996
