= SNCF Class Z 50000 =

Class of 360 French electric multiple unit trains

Z 50000
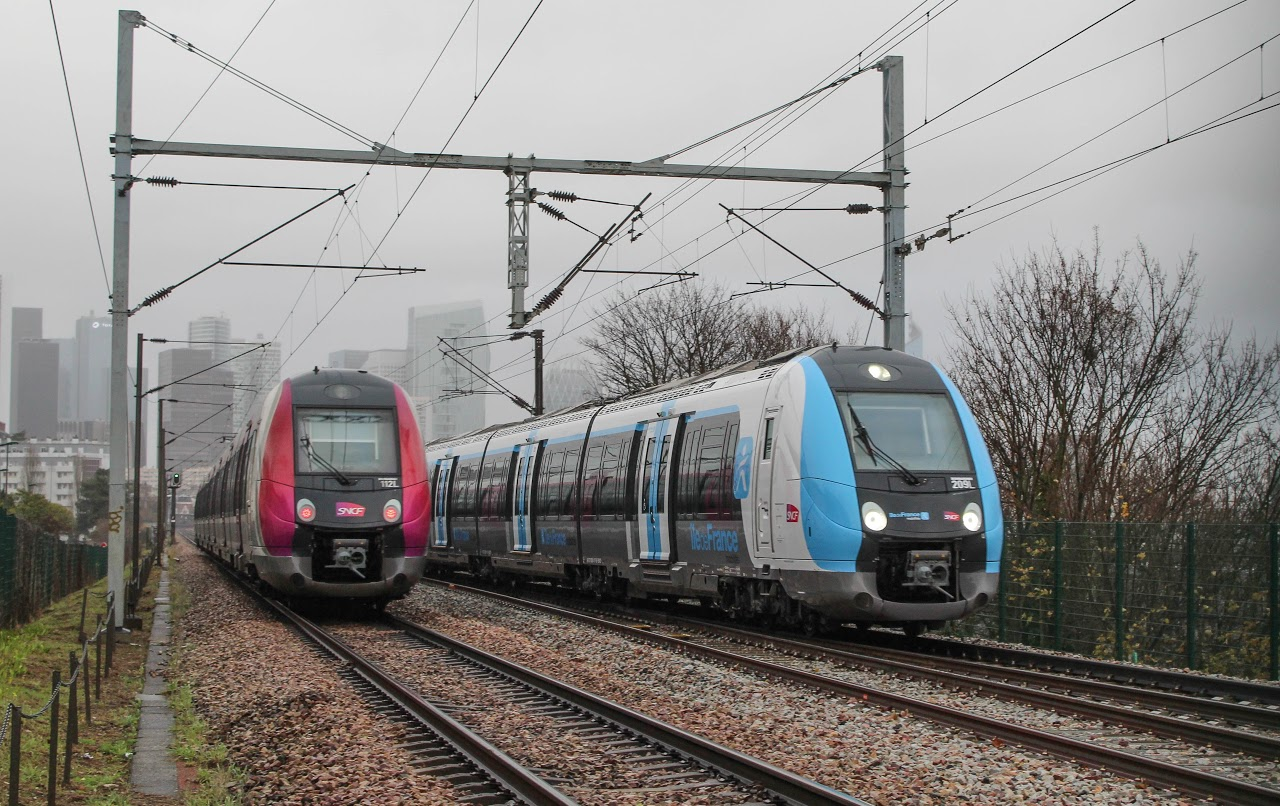
- A pair of Z 50000 trainsets in the older Carmillon livery (left) and the STIF/ÎdFM livery (right)
- In service: 2009–present
- Manufacturer: Bombardier Transportation
- Built at: Crespin
- Replaced: BB 17000; RIB; Z 6100; Z 6400; VB2N; Z 20500
- Constructed: 2009–2022
- Entered service: 14 December 2009
- Number built: 360 trainsets
- Number in service: 360 trainsets (as of 2 December 2022) (2686 cars)
- Formation: 16 cars per trainset 194 trainsets with 16 cars 166 trainsets with 16 cars (all as of 2 December 2022)
- Fleet numbers: Z 50001/2–50719/720
- Capacity: Seated: 405 (Note: 7-car train) / 503 (Note: 8-car train); Standing: 468 / 552 (at 4 per square metre)
- Operator: SNCF
- Depots: Technicentre Paris Nord; Technicentre Paris Est; Levallois; Argenteuil
- Line served: RER RER E Transilien Transilien Line H (Paris-Nord) Transilien Line J (Paris-Saint-Lazare) Transilien Line K (Paris-Nord) Transilien Line L (Paris-Saint-Lazare) Transilien Line P (Paris-Est)

Specifications
- Car body construction: Stainless steel
- Train length: 94.3 m (309 ft 5 in); 112.5 m (369 ft 1 in)
- Car length: 16.53 m (54 ft 3 in) (end car); 13.24 m (43 ft 5 in) (intermediate cars)
- Width: 3.06 m (10 ft 0 in)
- Height: 4.28 m (14 ft 1 in)
- Floor height: 985 mm (38.8 in)
- Wheel diameter: 840 mm (33.07 in)
- Wheelbase: 1,900 mm (75 in)
- Maximum speed: 140 km/h (87 mph)
- Weight: 210,000 kg (460,000 lb); 240,000 kg (530,000 lb)
- Traction system: Bombardier MITRAC IGBT–VVVF
- Traction motors: 10 × 262 kW (351 hp) 3-phase AC induction motor
- Power output: 2,620 kW (3,513 hp)
- Acceleration: 1 m/s^{2} (2.2 mph/s) (up to 50 km/h (31 mph))
- Deceleration: 1.05 m/s^{2} (2.3 mph/s) (service)
- Electric systems: Overhead line: 25 kV 50 Hz AC; 1,500 V DC
- Current collection: Pantograph Type AX
- UIC classification: Bo′+2′+Bo′+Bo′+2′+Bo′+2′+Bo′ (7 cars); Bo′+2′+Bo′+Bo′+2′+2′+Bo′+2′+Bo′ (8 cars)
- Bogies: FLEXX Compact (jacobs)
- Braking systems: Disc, dynamic and regenerative
- Safety systems: Crocodile and KVB
- Coupling system: Scharfenberg type
- Multiple working: Z 50000
- Track gauge: 1,435 mm (4 ft 8 1/2 in) standard gauge

The SNCF Class Z 50000, also known as the 'Francilian', or 'NAT' (for French: Nouvelle Automotrice Transilien, English: New Transilien Railcar, the project name) is a type of dual-voltage electric multiple unit trainset designed in the 2000s. It is used on the commuter rail system serving Paris and its Île-de-France suburbs on the Transilien network running out of Gare du Nord, Gare de l'Est and Gare Saint-Lazare.

A total of 360 trainsets have been built by Canadian conglomerate Bombardier at its Crespin, France (near Valenciennes) factory between 2006 and 2022. The first set was placed into regular passenger service on 14 December 2009.

The name Francilien is also the demonym for people living in Île-de-France.

== History ==
In 2004, the Syndicat des transports d'Île-de-France (STIF, the transit authority for the Paris region until June 2017) began the tendering process for approximately 180 new electric multiple unit trainsets to replace SNCF's aging single-deck suburban fleet, including trainsets nicknamed “inox” (short for inoxydable, English: stainless [steel], Classes Z 5300, Z 6100, Z 6400) and similar push-pull trainsets known as RIB (Rame inox de banlieue) and RIO (Rame inox omnibus). SNCF and STIF requested bids for a train design that could operate on a typical journey of 30 to 50 kilometres (19 to 31 miles) in length, including numerous stops lasting 30 to 40 seconds, and able to operate using either 1,500 V DC or 25 kV 50 Hz AC overhead catenary electrification.

Alstom, Bombardier, and Siemens all submitted bids for the project. In 2006, SNCF and STIF awarded the contract to Bombardier with a firm order for 172 ‘Francilien’ trainsets at a cost of €1.85 billion, with an option for 200 more.

Bombardier presented the Spacium vehicle at Crespin on 6 February 2009. The first service operated by a Francilien train was on Transilien Line H from Paris Gare du Nord to Luzarches on Sunday 13 December 2009. As of December 2018, 360 trainsets had been ordered, and about 240 were in active service.

== Design ==
The Bombardier vehicles are articulated using Jakobs bogies between the carriages. Seating is in a 3+2 layout, resulting in over 400 seats in a seven-car unit, and over 500 in an eight-car set. Total capacity exceeds 800 (or 1,000 in eight-car trains) including standing passengers at 4 passengers per square metre (3.3/sq yd). The vehicle's width is 3.06 metres (10 ft 0 in), which is wider than previous trains, achieved by having a relatively short car length of 13.24 metres (43 ft 5 in). The inter-carriage passages have wide, open gangway connections, allowing passengers to spread throughout the train. All interior lights are provided by light-emitting diodes (LED), reducing power consumption.

== Technical characteristics ==
The dual-current capacity (1,500 V DC and 25,000 V AC) enables the train to serve the entire Ile-de-France network. Its electrical consumption is 20% lower than that of equipment in circulation in 2009. Each bogie has two three-phase asynchronous traction motors. They each operate at a voltage of 380 V and 50 hertz. Traction power is distributed over five motor bogies, one located at each end of the train set, and between cars 2 and 3, 3 and 4, and 6 and 7 in the long version, or 5 and 6 in the short variant.

A train is divided into two distinct sets: cars 1 to 4 on the one hand, and cars 6 to 8 on the other hand. Each of these half-elements has two traction circuits in parallel. This redundancy reduces the risk of trainset unavailability in the event of a breakdown. The Z 50000 are distinguished by another specific feature: in normal operation, only 80% of the available power, or 2,950 kW (3,960 hp) for one element, is used. In the event of failure of one of the engine blocks, the other engines are actuated at 100% in order to ensure the normal operation of the train.

The acceleration reaches 0.9 m/s^{2} (2.0 mph/s) for the eight-motor up to 1/05 m/s2 in maximum engine power configuration and 1 m/s^{2} (2.2 mph/s) for the seven-motor configuration which can also reach 1,1 m/s 2. The deceleration reaches −1.05 m/s^{2} (−2.3 mph/s) during service braking.

== Formations ==
As of 7 June 2025, 360 Z50000 trainsets (01H to 360L) have been delivered.

=== 8 cars sets ===
The 8-cars trainsets are formed as shown below, with five motorised cars and three non-powered trailer cars (5M3T). Each trainset has 5 motorized Jakobs bogies and 4 trailer bogies.

They are based at the Noisy le Sec (Line E and P), and les Joncherolles/St Denis (Line H and K) depots.

RER E	<- Haussman - St Lazare / Paris Tournan / Chelles ->							
Car No.	1	> 2	3	4	5	6	7 <	8
Type	Motorised	Trailer	Motorised		Trailer	Motorised	Trailer	Motorised
Numbering	Z50xxx(odd number)	ZR501xxx (odd number)	ZZ502xxx (odd number)	ZR503xxx(odd number)	ZR504xxx (odd number)	ZR505xxx (odd number)	ZR506xxx (odd number)	Z50xxx (even number)

Line H	<-Paris Nord Pontoise / Luzarches/ Creil ->							
Car No.	1	> 2	3	4	5	6	7 <	8
Type	Motorised	Trailer	Motorised		Trailer	Motorised	Trailer	Motorised
Numbering	Z50xxx(odd number)	ZR501xxx (odd number)	ZZ502xxx (odd number)	ZR503xxx(odd number)	ZR504xxx (odd number)	ZR505xxx (odd number)	ZR506xxx (odd number)	Z50xxx (even number)

Line K	<- Paris Nord Crepy en Valois ->							
Car No.	1	> 2	3	4	5	6	7 <	8
Type	Motorised	Trailer	Motorised		Trailer	Motorised	Trailer	Motorised
Numbering	Z50xxx(odd number)	ZR501xxx (odd number)	ZZ502xxx (odd number)	ZR503xxx(odd number)	ZR504xxx (odd number)	ZR505xxx (odd number)	ZR506xxx (odd number)	Z50xxx (even number)

Line P	<- Paris Est Provins/La Ferté-Milon/Château-Thierry ->							
Car No.	1	> 2	3	4	5	6	7 <	8
Type	Motorised	Trailer	Motorised		Trailer	Motorised	Trailer	Motorised
Numbering	Z50xxx(odd number)	ZR501xxx (odd number)	ZZ502xxx (odd number)	ZR503xxx(odd number)	ZR504xxx (odd number)	ZR505xxx (odd number))	ZR506xxx (odd number)	Z50xxx (even number)

- < or > show a pantograph. Cars 2 and 7 were each equipped with one pantograph.
- The third car's vehicle number is prefixed ZZ because it is supported by two motorized Jacobs bogies.

=== 7 cars sets ===
The 7-cars trainsets are formed as shown below, with three motorised cars and two non-powered trailer cars (5M2T). Each trainset has 5 motorized Jakobs bogies and 3 trailer bogies.

They are based at Levallois (Line L), and le Val Notre Dame/Argenteuil (Line J) depots.

Line L	<-Paris St Lazare Versailles RD / St Nom la Breteche/ Cergy ->						
Car No.	1	> 2	3	4	5	6 <	7
Type	Motorised	Trailer	Motorised		Trailer	Motorised	
Numbering	Z50xxx(odd number)	ZR501xxx (odd number)	ZZ502xxx (odd number)	ZR507xxx(odd number)	ZR505xxx (odd number))	ZR506xxx (odd number)	Z50xxx (even number)

Line J	<- Paris St Lazare Ermont-Eaubonne/Mantes (Vernon)/Pontoise (Gisors) ->						
Car No.	1	> 2	3	4	5	6 <	7
Type	Motorised	Trailer	Motorised		Trailer	Motorised	
Numbering	Z50xxx(odd number)	ZR501xxx (odd number)	ZZ502xxx (odd number)	ZR507xxx(odd number)	ZR505xxx (odd number))	ZR506xxx (odd number)	Z50xxx (even number)

- < or > show a pantograph. Cars 2 and 9 were each equipped with one pantograph.
- The third car's vehicle number is prefixed ZZ because it is supported by two motorized Jacobs bogies.

== Fleet ==
The number of Z50000 trainsets is 339 (at the 1st March 2022). They are on operations on the E, H, J, K, L and P Line.

- Listing Fleet Z50000 (in french)

== Photo gallery ==
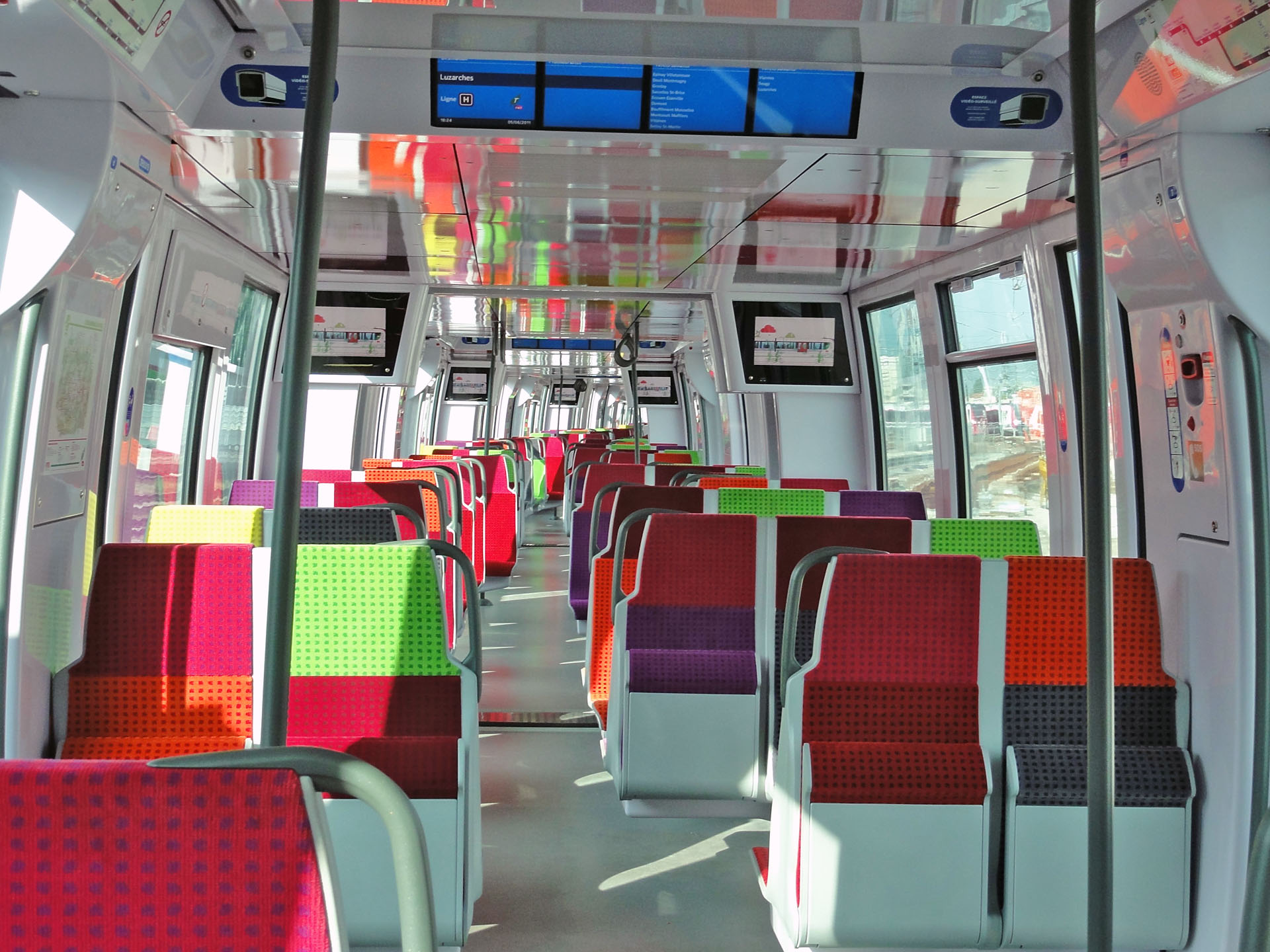
Interior, showing 3+2 seating

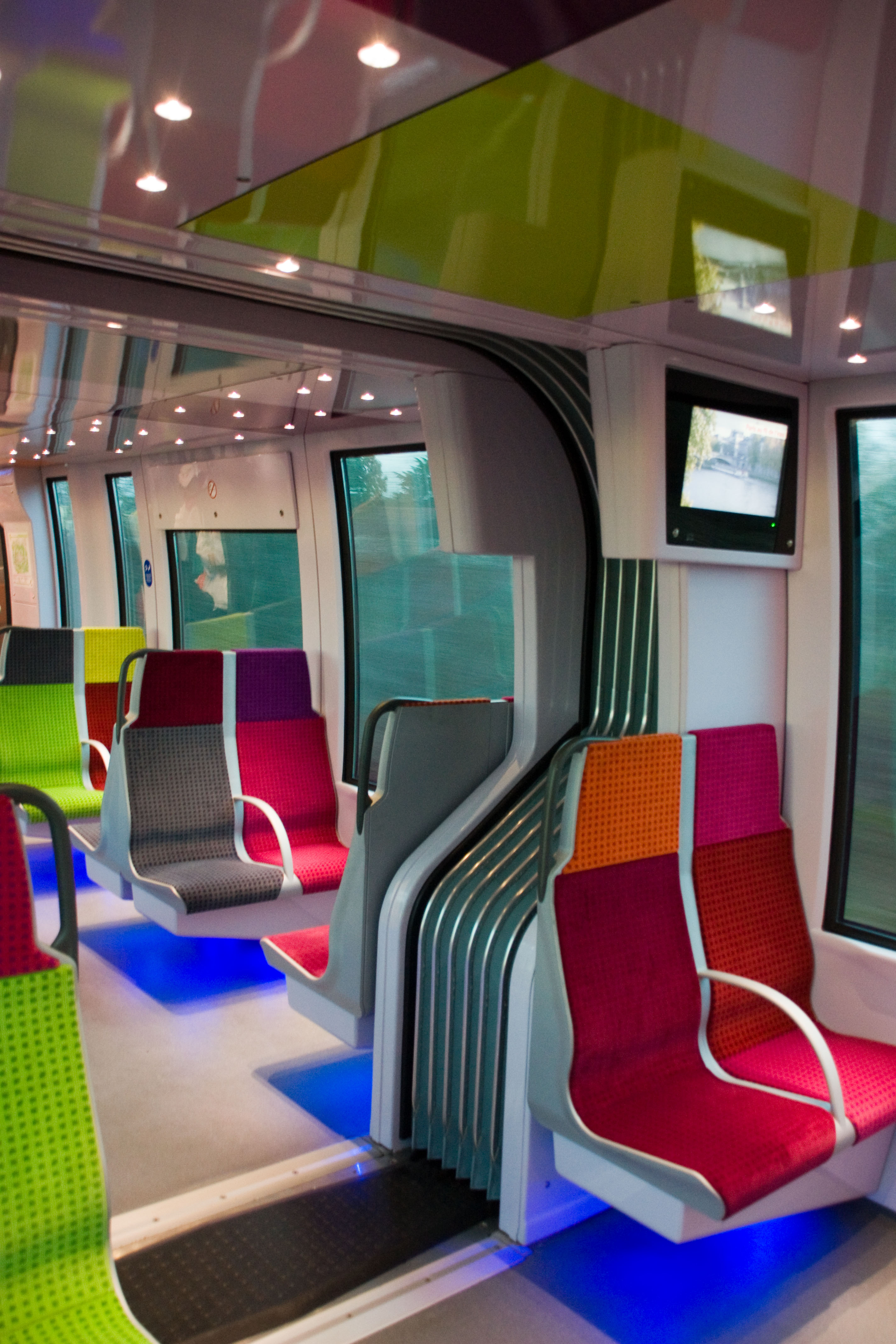
Interior, showing open gangway connection

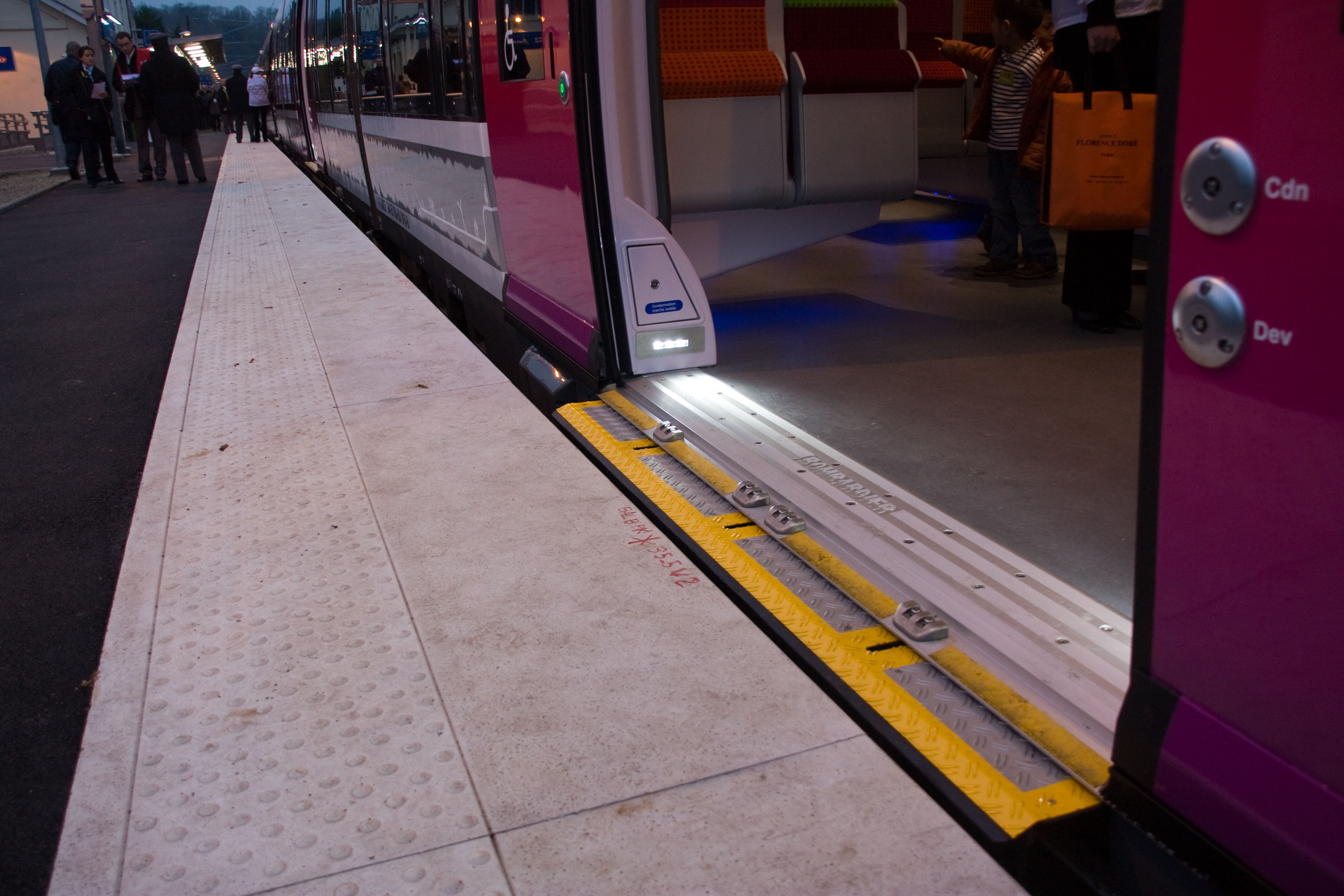
Gap filler allowing easy access for wheelchair users

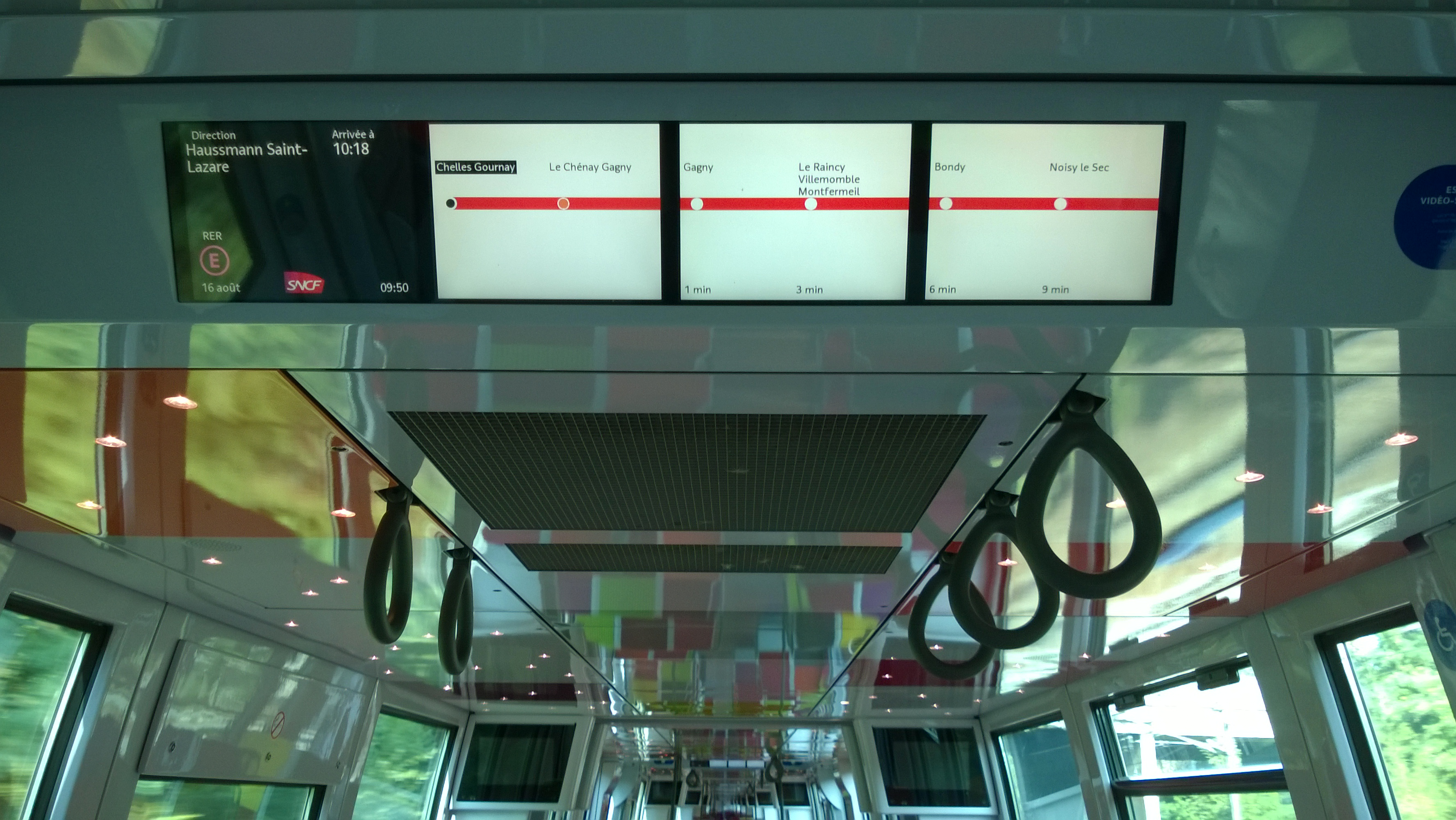
SIVE dynamic passenger information screens

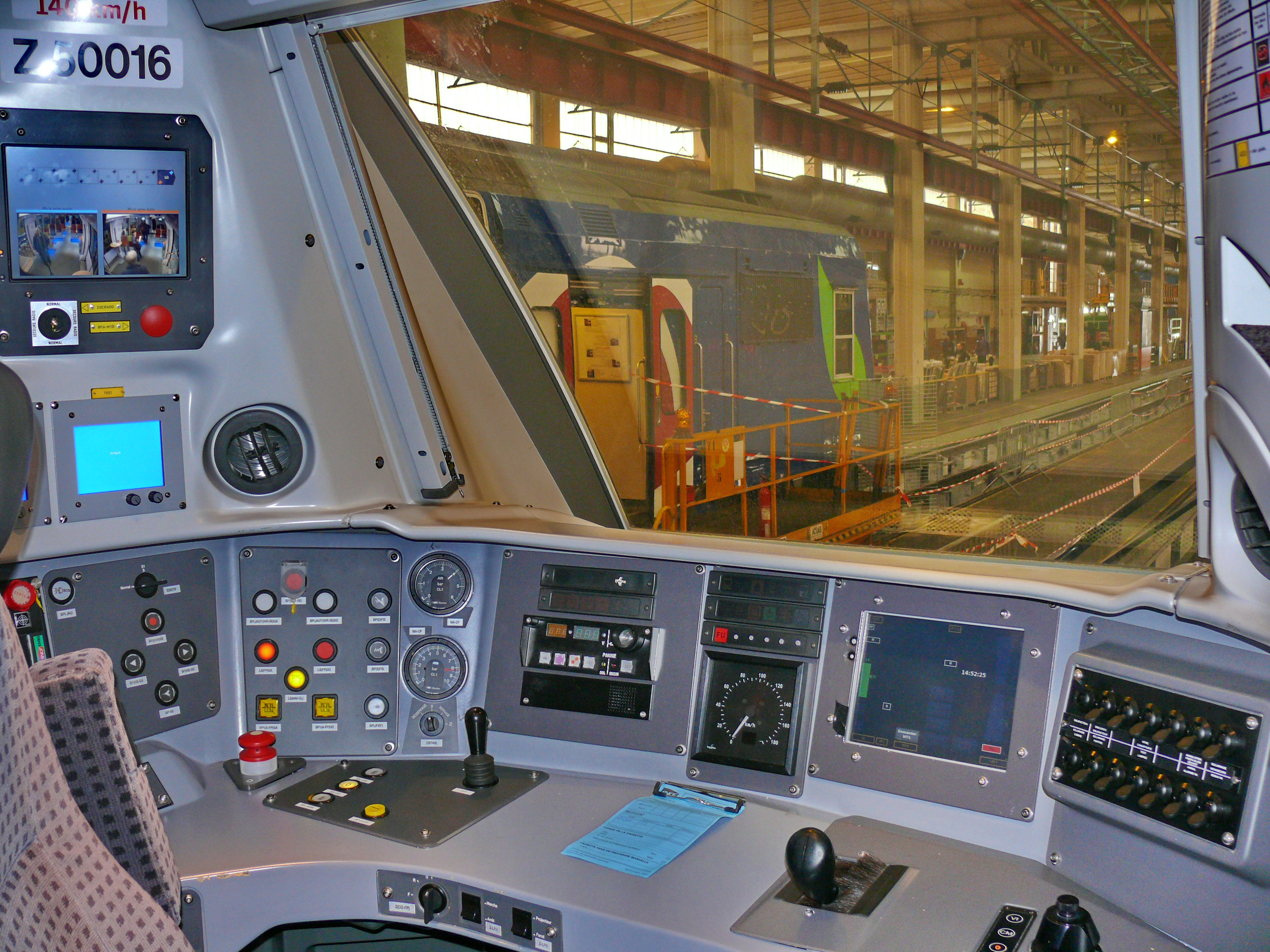
Operator's cab

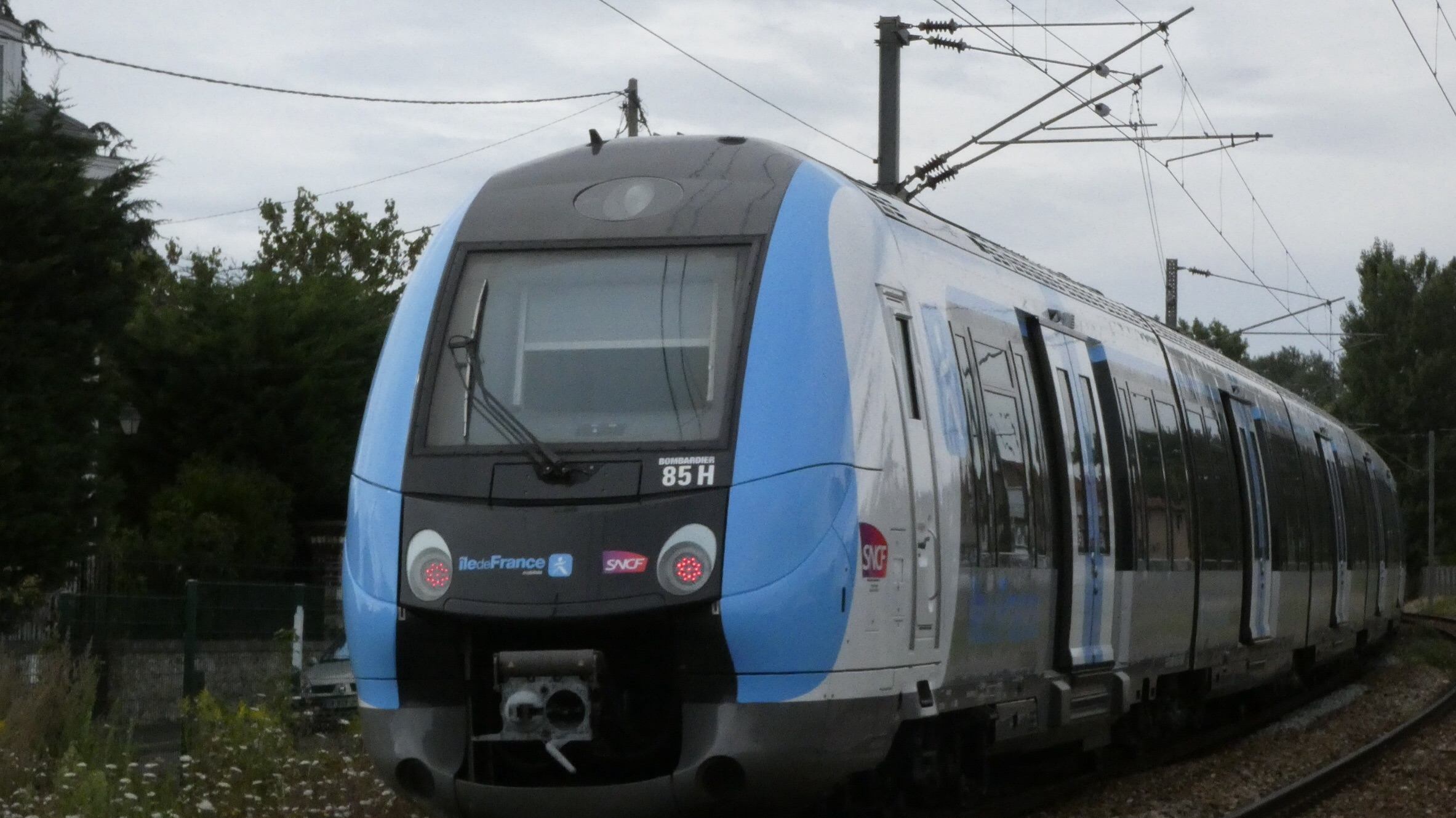
Z 50000 in the new Île-de-France Mobilités livery on Transilien Line H at Bessancourt station

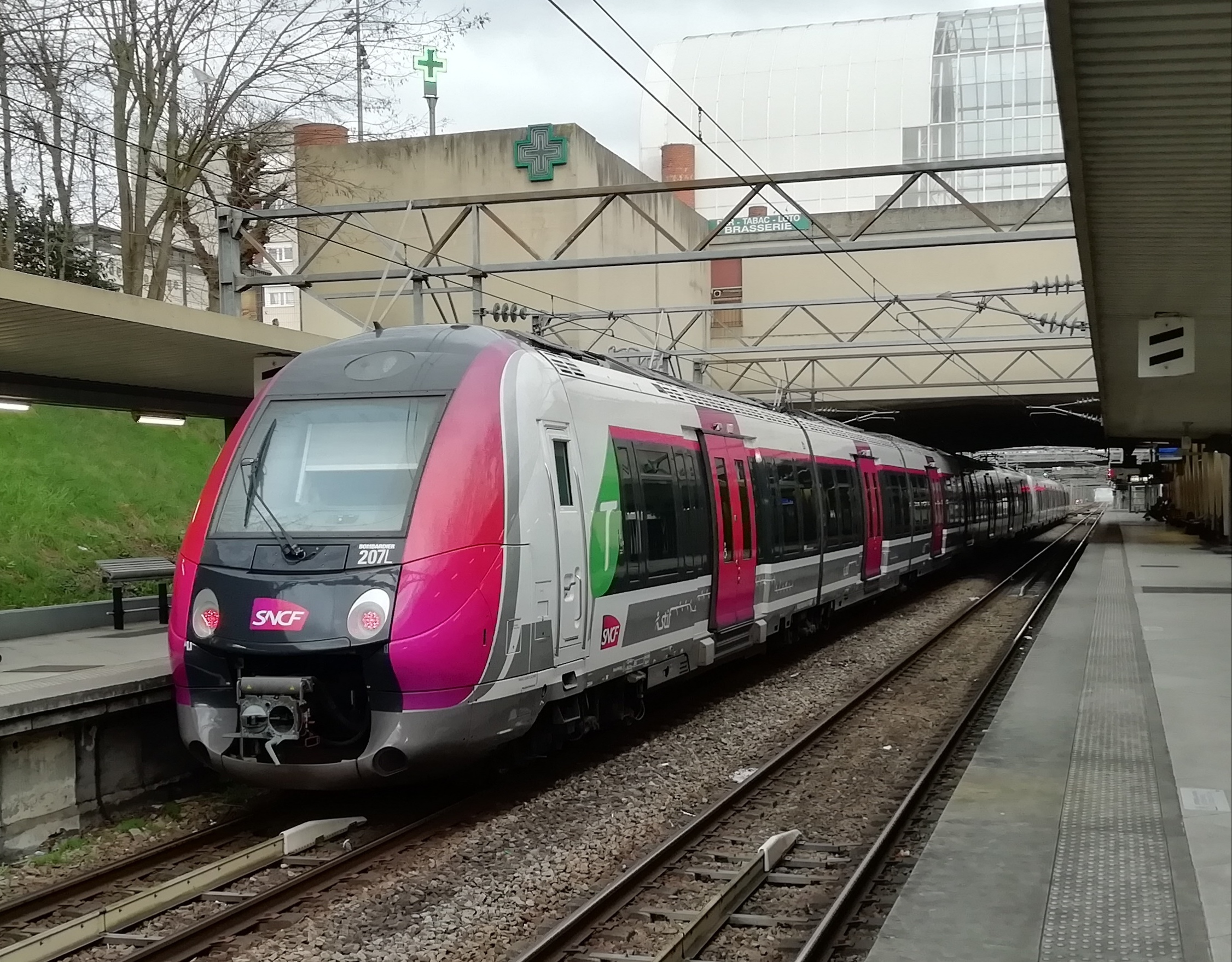
Z 50000 in the older Carmillon livery on Transilien Line L at Cergy-Saint-Christophe station

== See also ==
- List of SNCF classes
