= François Edmond Eugène de Barlatier de Mas =

de Barlatier du Mas : d'azur, à la croix alaisée d'or, cantonnée de quatre étoiles de même

François Edmond Eugène de Barlatier de Mas (1810 – 1888) was a French naval officer.

Born in 1810 in the Saussay. He was the son of Auguste de Barlatier de Mas 1781-1836 and Sophie Joséphine Archdeacon 1785–1857, and grandson of the Famous Captain Paul François Ignace de Barlatier de Mas who fought in the American War of Independence against the English and was awarded a permanent seat in the General Society of the Cincinnati. He married Thérèse Armandine Santerre, great-niece of General Antoine Joseph Santerre, and had three children, Sophie de Barlatier de Mas Peghoux 1842–1918, Armand Auguste de Barlatier de Mas 1845-1894 and Jacques Edmond de Barlatier de Mas 1851–1857.

François Edmond entered the Navy in 1827, being an aspirant on 16 October 1827, Enseigne de vaisseau on 31 January 1832, Lieutenant on 10 April 1837, and Commander on 9 January 1852; Barlatier de Mas was also an Officer of the Legion of Honor. On 1 January 1860, he became an Aide-Major in Cherbourg, with the Captain, Philippe Robin Du Parc, General mayor of the 1st arrondissement maritime.

Lieutenant de Barlatier de Mas was aboard the French ship Astrolabe on Jules Dumont d'Urville's expedition to the Southern Seas. The ships left Toulon on 7 September 1837. On 22 January 1838 the ships came across the Antarctic peninsula region. The De Mas Rocks were named after him during that expedition.

During his travels to the South Seas Barlatier de Mas collected a vast ensemble of art which is now part of the collection of the Musée de Beaux-Arts de Dunkerque.

Paul François Ignace de Barlatier de Mas was a member of the Society of the Cincinnati from France.
