= Paul François Ignace de Barlatier de Mas =

French military leader (1739–1807)

Paul François Ignace Barlatier de Mas
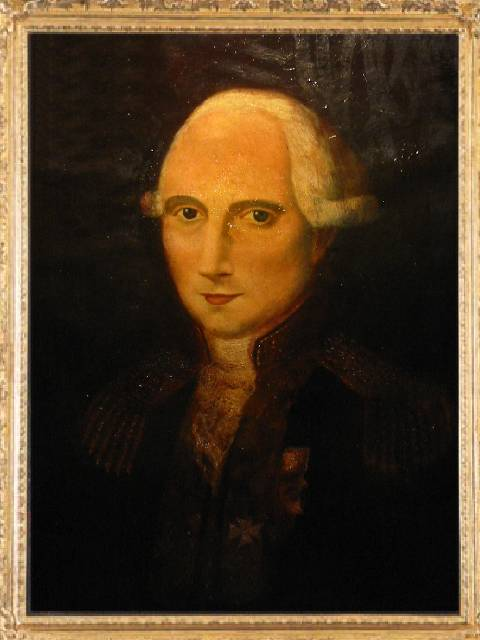
- From the Edouard Barlatier de Mas Collection
- Born: 1739
- Died: 1807 (aged 67–68)
- Occupation: Naval captain
- Years active: 1755–1785 (naval career)

de Barlatier du Mas : d'azur, à la croix alaisée d'or, cantonnée de quatre étoiles de même

Paul François Ignace Barlatier de Mas (1739 – 1807) was a career French naval captain who participated in the American Revolutionary War on behalf of the Continentals. He was the Captain of the Alexandre and was made the second Lord of Le Mas (Seigneur du Mas).

== Early life and education ==
He was born in 1739, the son of Louis Mathieu de Balatier de Mas, a counselour of the parliament of Aix in Provence, and Anne Cécile d´Estienne Blégier. He was the only surviving son of seven children.

== Marriage and family ==
In 1767, he married Anne Marie de Perier de la Garde, with whom he had eight children. His direct descendants include Count Pierre Barlatier de Mas, Baron Paul Albert Raymond Barlatier de Mas and the explorer François Edmond Eugene de Barlatier de Mas.

== Career ==
He was promoted to a Garde-Marine in 1755, an Enseigne de Vaisseau in 1757, a Lieutenant de Vaisseau in 1771, and a Capitaine de Vaisseau du Roy in 1781.

For his contributions during the Revolution (which was a way to weaken Great Britain), Barlatier de Mas was made a chevalier de St Louis (knight). He was given a permanent hereditary membership in the Society of the Cincinnati for his contribution to the American Revolutionary War. It would descend to his eldest male descendant in each generation, by primogeniture.

Balatier de Mas retired from the French Navy in 1785 to become a Chef des Classes in the French Antibes from 1786-90.
