= Baron Barlatier de Mas =

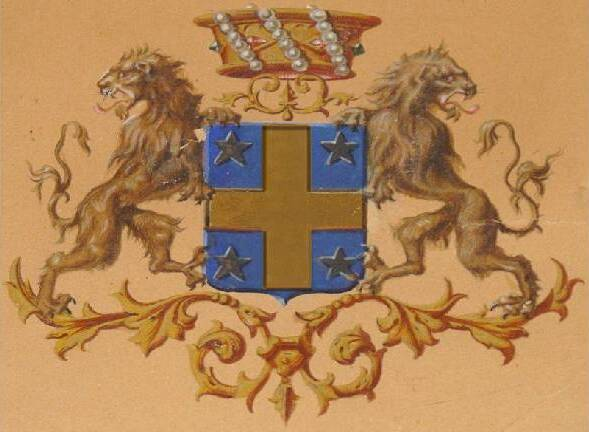
Arms of Count Pierre Barlatier de Mas

Paul Albert Raymond Barlatier de Mas (13 October 1802, Saint-Omer - 24 January 1874, Paris), was a French Baron, Chief of the Paris-Lyon-Méditerranée Railway Company, and mayor of Dammarie-les-Lys. Baron Barlatier de Mas was the grandson of Captain Paul François Ignace de Barlatier de Mas. In 1776 Barlatier de Mas married Marie Élise Trappier de Malcolm, daughter of the Napoleonic General and Baron, Jacques-Elisée Trappier de Malcolm and Marie-Charlotte-Félicité Lombard de Villeneuve.
