= Château Soubiran =

Town hall in Dammarie-lès-Lys, France

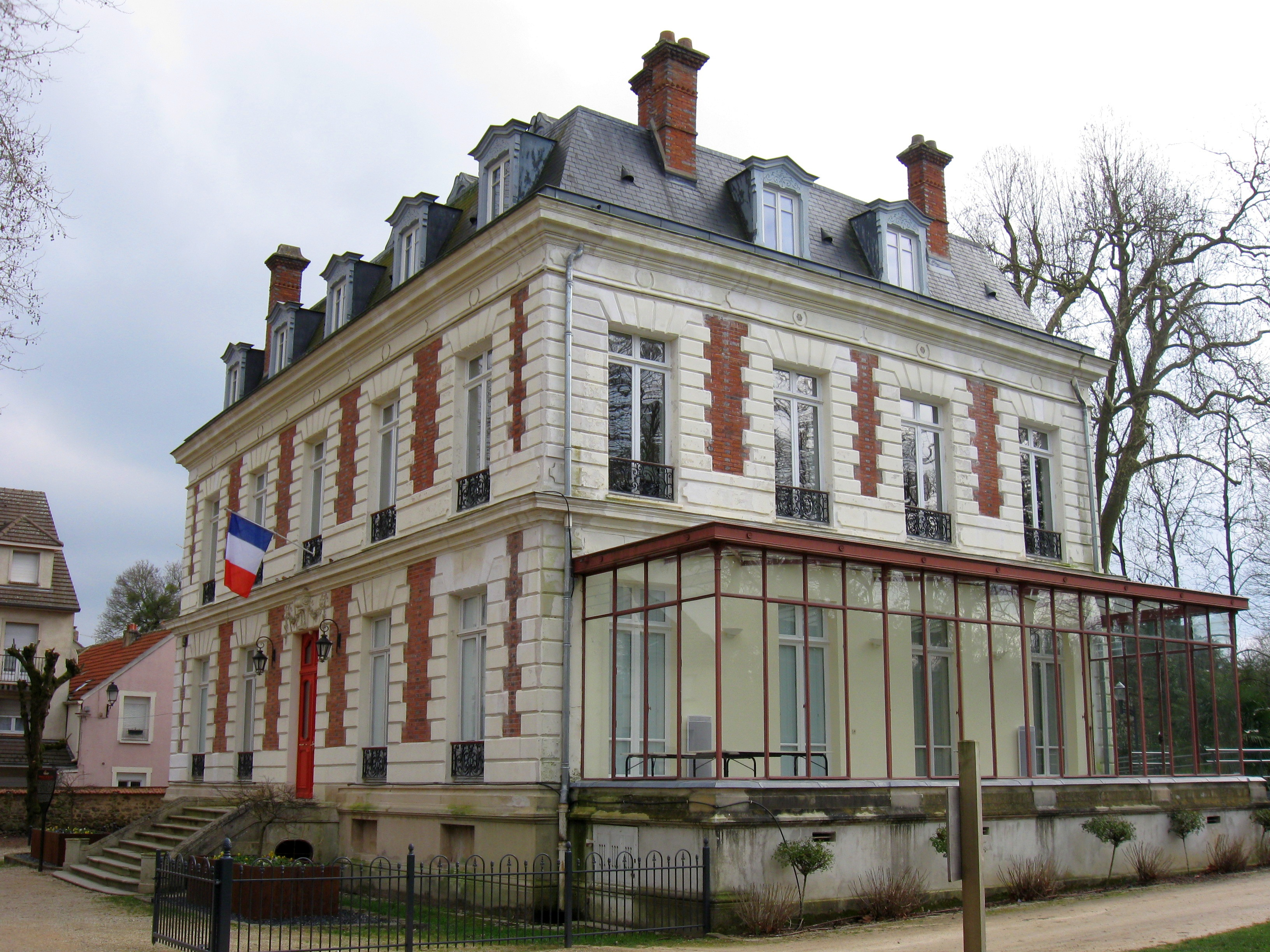
- The main frontage of the Château Soubiran in February 2016
- Interactive map of the Château Soubiran area

General information
- Type: City hall
- Architectural style: Louis XIII style
- Location: Dammarie-lès-Lys, France
- Coordinates: 48.5132°N 2.6331°E
- Completed: c.1850

The Château Soubiran (French pronunciation: [otɛl də vil] is a municipal building in Dammarie-lès-Lys, Seine-et-Marne, in the southeastern suburbs of Paris, standing on Avenue Henri Barbusse.

== History ==
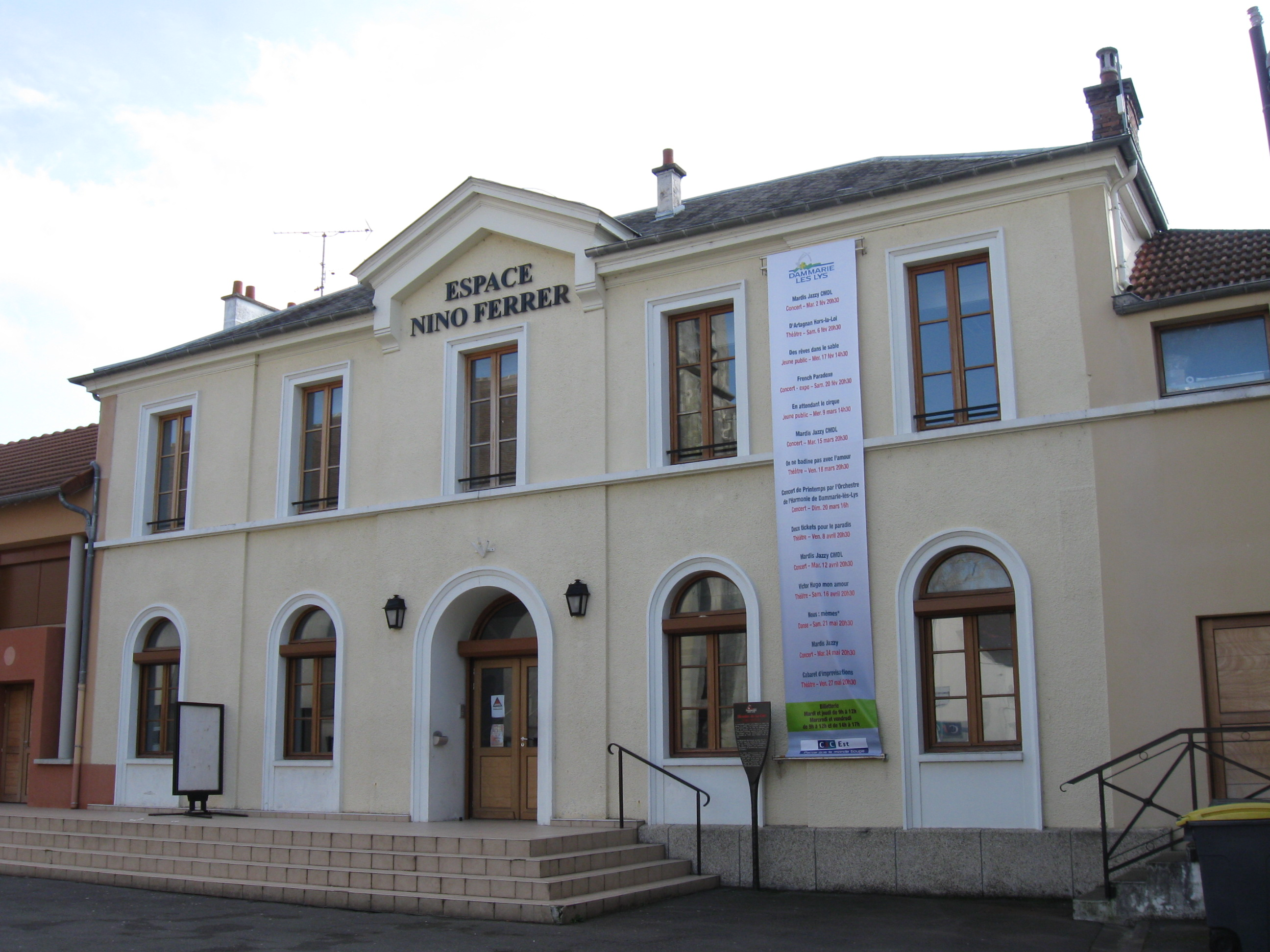
The first town hall

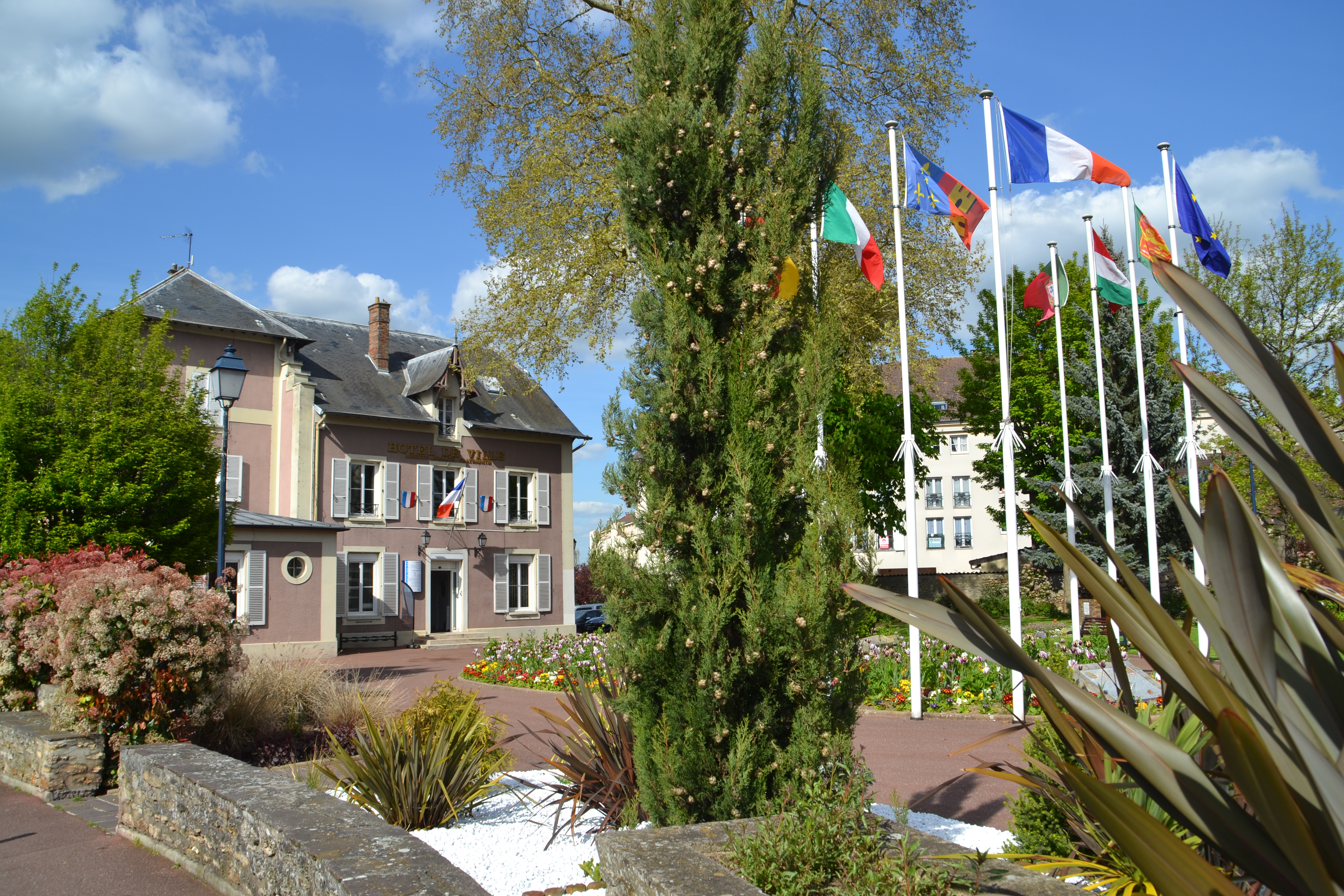
The second town hall

=== The first town hall ===
Following the French Revolution, the town council initially held their meetings in the house of the mayor at the time. This arrangement continued until the mid-19th century, when the council decided to commission a combined town hall and school. The site they selected was on the south side of the town square (now Place Robert Décosse), adjacent to the Church of Notre-Dame-de-la-Visitation. The new building was designed in the neoclassical style, built in brick with a cement render finish and completed in 1854.

The design involved a symmetrical main frontage of five bays facing onto the square. The central bay featured a round-headed doorway with a moulded surround on the ground floor, a square-headed window with a moulded surround on the first floor and an open pediment above. The other bays were fenestrated by round-headed windows on the ground floor and by square-headed windows on the first floor.

A war memorial, designed in the form of a column on a pedestal and intended to commemorate the lives of local service personnel who died in the First World War, was placed in front of the building in July 1922.

After the building was no longer required for municipal use, it became a function hall in 1937. It was renamed after the actor, Raymond Bussières, in 1960 and, following renovation, it was renamed again after the singer-songwriter, Nino Ferrer, in 2006.

=== The second town hall ===
In 1934, the council led by the mayor, Léon Jacquin, decided to relocate to a more substantial building. The building they selected was the Bâtiment Sertier on Rue Charles-de-Gaulle. The house had been designed in the neoclassical style, built in brick with a cement render finish and was probably completed in the mid-19th century. It was in the ownership of the mayor of the town, Désiré Sertier, by 1874. The design involved an asymmetrical main frontage of four bays with the left-hand bay projected forward. There was a doorway in the third bay, and the remainer of the building was fenestrated by casement windows. It was acquired by the council in the 1920s and subsequently served as the town hall for around a century.

=== The Château ===
In 2023, following significant population growth, the council led by the mayor, Gilles Battail, again decided to relocate. The building they selected was the Château Soubiran on the west side of Avenue Henri Barbusse. The château had been commissioned a medical doctor, Jean Soubiran, and had been initially known as Chateau du Bas-Bouillant. It had been designed in the Louis XIII style, built in red brick with stone finishings and had been completed in the mid-19th century. The design involved a symmetrical main frontage of five bays. The central bay featured a flight of steps leading up to a square headed doorway on the ground floor and a casement window on the first floor. The other bays were fenestrated in a similar style and there were dormer windows at roof level.

After the President of France, Sadi Carnot, was assassinated in 1894, his daughter, Claire, was cared for in the château for several months.

A farm was established in the large park surrounding the château in 1899. It remained in the same family for many years and passed to Eugène Soubiran in 1908. The château was opened to the public in 1976 and was converted for municipal use in November 2023.
