= Transilien =

Suburban rail network around Paris

Overview
- Owner: Île-de-France Mobilités
- Locale: Île-de-France
- Transit type: Commuter rail
- Number of lines: 19
- Line number: Transilien Transilien Line H (Paris-Nord) Transilien Line J (Paris-Saint-Lazare) Transilien Line K (Paris-Nord) Transilien Line L (Paris-Saint-Lazare) Transilien Line N (Paris-Montparnasse) Transilien Line P (Paris-Est) Transilien Line R (Paris-Gare-de-Lyon) Transilien Line U Transilien Line V
- Number of stations: 392
- Daily ridership: 3,400,000
- Chief executive: Sylvie Charles
- Website: transilien.com

Operation
- Began operation: 20 September 1999
- Operator: SNCF

Technical
- System length: 1,299 km (807 mi)
- Electrification: Overhead line: 25 kV 50 Hz AC; 1,500 V DC
- Top speed: 160 km/h (99 mph)

Transilien (pronounced [tʁɑ̃siljɛ̃]) is the brand name given to the commuter rail and tram-train network operated by SNCF and serving Île-de-France, the region surrounding and including the city of Paris. The network consists of lines H, J, K, L, N, P, R, U and V that begin and end in major Parisian stations, except for lines U and V which connect major stations outside the Paris city borders. The network also includes the RER, the trains that cross the centre.

The Transilien brand was established on 20 September 1999 as a way to unify the suburban network that existed since the late nineteenth century. The name "Transilien" is a derivative of Francilien, the demonym for people living in Île-de-France. As part of the rebranding effort, stations and rolling stock were modernized.

The area covered does not correspond exactly with the boundaries of the Île-de-France region, with some lines crossing into other regions. On the other hand, some stations located at the margins of the Île-de-France region, are not served by Transilien routes, but instead TER trains from neighboring regions.

Transilien trains operate over tracks owned by SNCF Réseau (formerly RFF) and the same tracks are used by mainline passenger trains (TGV and Intercités), by other transport operators (Renfe, Deutsche Bahn, Eurostar, and Venice-Simplon Orient Express) and by freight trains.

The Transilien brand can also be seen on the RER C, D and E lines and tramway line 4, which are operated by the same division of SNCF.

== History ==
=== Appearance of first suburban trains ===
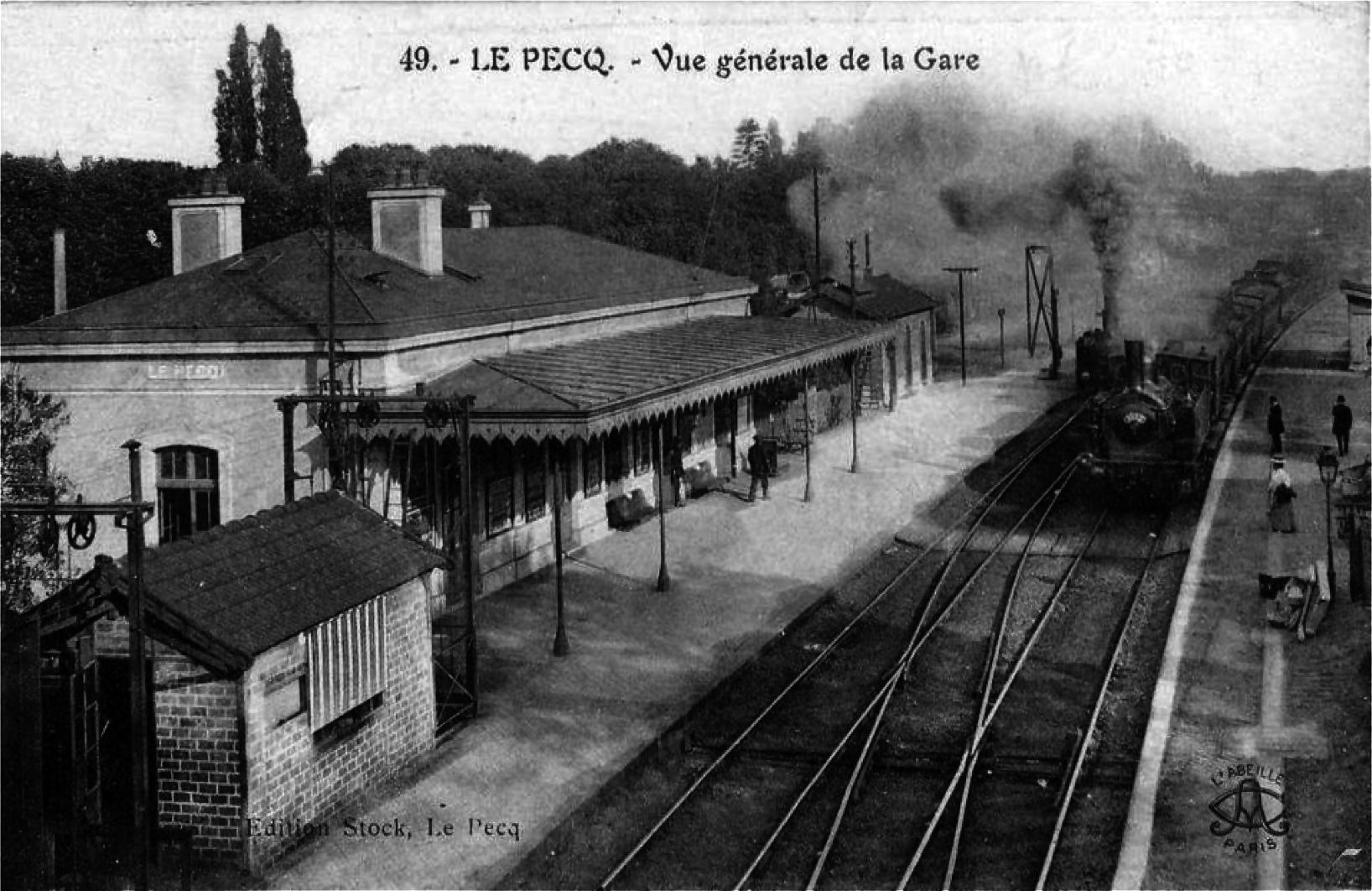
Le Pecq train station, around 1900, with 1847's passenger building.

The first line in the suburbs of Paris opened on 26 August 1837 between Paris (Saint-Lazare station) and Saint-Germain (the line stops temporarily at Le Pecq). This line was handed over to the RATP on 1 October 1972, when RER A was commissioned. Its immediate success led to the creation of numerous lines, primarily intended to link the main cities of France. Suburban service has long been marginal for large companies, with the exception of the West, where several short lines crossing residential areas are seeing their local traffic increase sharply. The creation of workers subscriptions marked a sharp increase in traffic, and especially, at the beginning of the massive urbanization at Paris' periphery, with the phenomenon of migrant workers.

=== Influence of lines on urbanization around Paris ===
The housing cost's increase as a result of major Haussmann works and the hygienic conditions inside Paris prompted workers and then employees working in the capital to live in the rural suburbs. The suburban trains allowed them and still allow them to rally their jobs inside the Île-de-France.

The successive topographic maps of the French IGN show the development of the Parisian suburbs over the decades near the stations of the suburban lines. In the region, especially south of the capital, these lines follow the bottom of the valleys because the steam traction did not support the steep gradients: the urbanization of the plateaus takes place later with the advent of the automobile for the general public during the second half of the 20th century. The automobile allowed people either to drive directly to work, or to live at a distance from the station, where land prices and rents are lower than in the immediate vicinity of the stations.

Geographers sometimes use pictured expressions to describe these two periods: the urbanization is done in "fingers of a glove" along the lines of suburban trains (the center of the glove being in Paris), then in a "spot of oil" with the car that allows to live a little further from the station.

=== Post-World War II ===
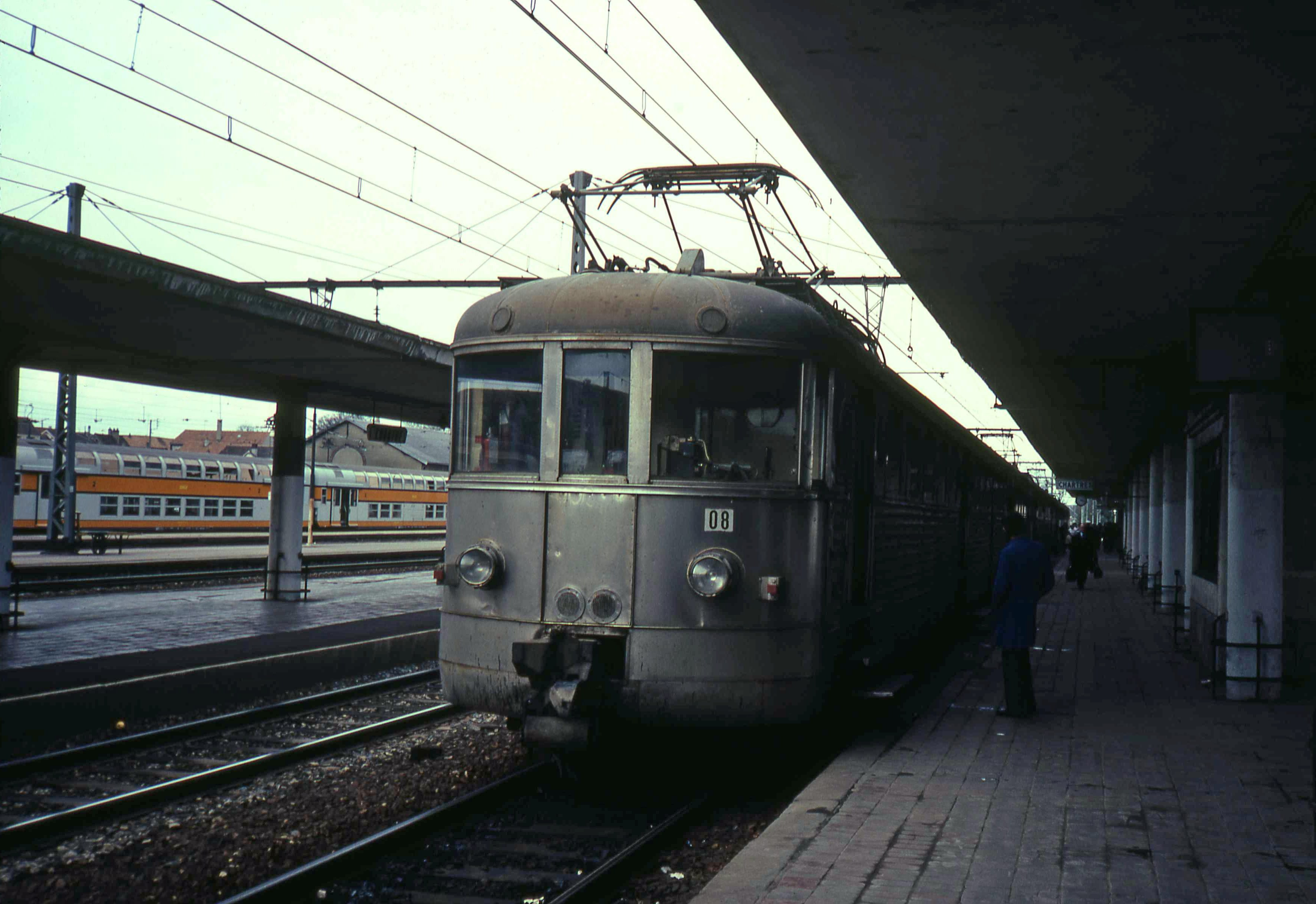
A Z 3700 train at Chartres station in April 1981

In 1938, the new SNCF exploited the disparate lines and materials bequeathed by the big companies. If the West seems to be very favored, with its electrified lines and powerful self-propelled equipment, the remainder of the network was still very far from these standards. During the Second World War, the traffic was very disorganized and limited. Bombings destroyed depots and rolling stock. Transport conditions were particularly tedious, and remained so for several years after the end of the conflict, a period when much had to be rebuilt. The bad memories of these difficult years, and the widespread adoption of personal transport reduced rail traffic, with regression from 1946 to 1958, and an even worse situation between 1952 and 1958.

From 1959 to 1969, major electrification began the gradual modernization of the rail network, with the final disappearance of steam engines in the suburbs in 1970. The proliferation of automobile congestion, combined with the modernization of the network, led to the return of traffic. From 1969 to 1988, the creation of the RER caused a radical change in the image of rail transport. RER Line A experienced a spectacular increase in passengers, which leads to a saturation point in less than ten years.

On 1 September 1999, the first class was removed on all trains in the commuter network, as well as on the RER. At the time, it represented only 1% of travelers. First class had already been removed on the Paris metro in 1991.

=== Transilien label ===
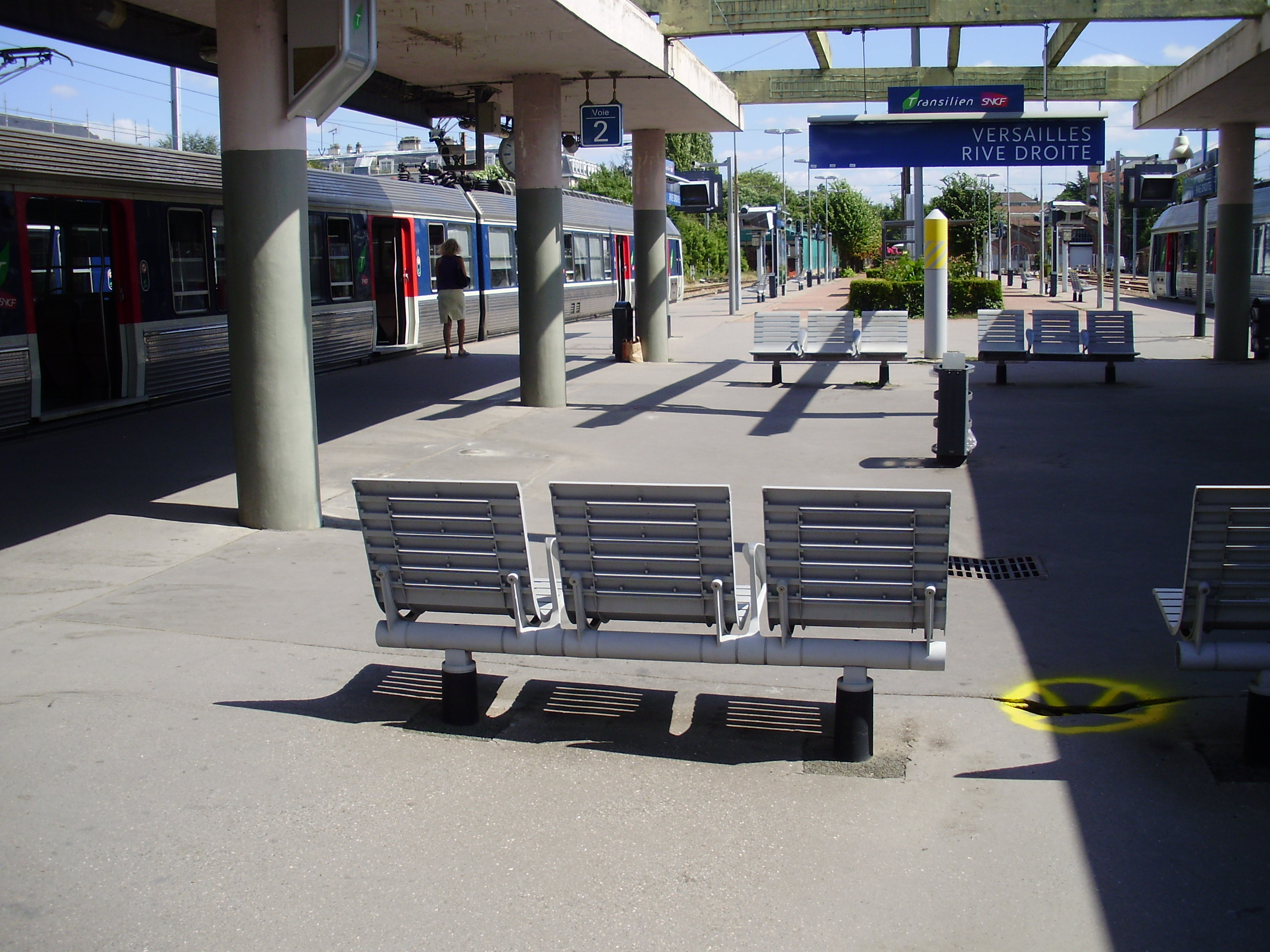
Furniture and signage in the Versailles-Rive-Droite train station, in August 2010.

However, despite the numerous investments made over the past three decades, the suburban network suffered from a poor public image and bad decision making by local authorities. While the RATP benefited from the RER's image, which it is generally associated with, having an aura of modernity and innovation under a distinct logo, the SNCF network reminded people of suburban trains which often had a negative connotation of obsolete rolling stock, chronic delays, and unwelcoming train stations.

SNCF developed a minimum standard of development and renovation of stations and rolling stock along with a label to identify it visibly for the general public. Numerous names identifying the suburban network were considered, such as TER Île-de-France, Citélien, and even the RER name. However, Transilien was ultimately chosen. The name was officially presented on 20 September 1999. In order to earn the designation, stations must maintain minimum criteria regarding comfort and modernization. However, SNCF ultimately controls which stations are designated and quickly becomes a brand, much like the TGV, the TER or Intercités. In the case of Transilien, modernization of equipment is much more expensive and is undertaken more gradually. The first train equipped with this label is the Z 6435/6 of the Z 6400 series.

== Today ==
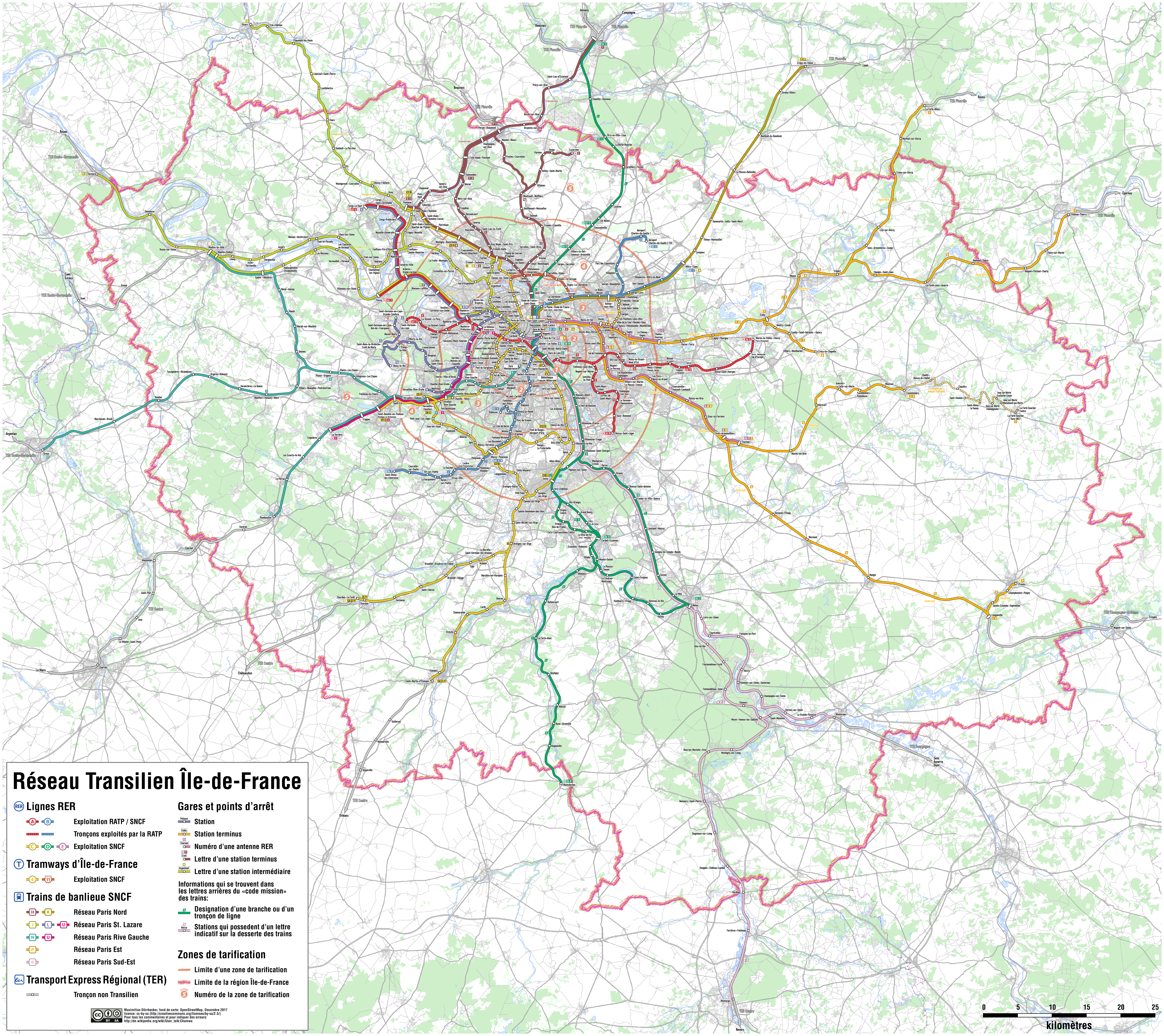
The Transilien network in the Île-de-France region

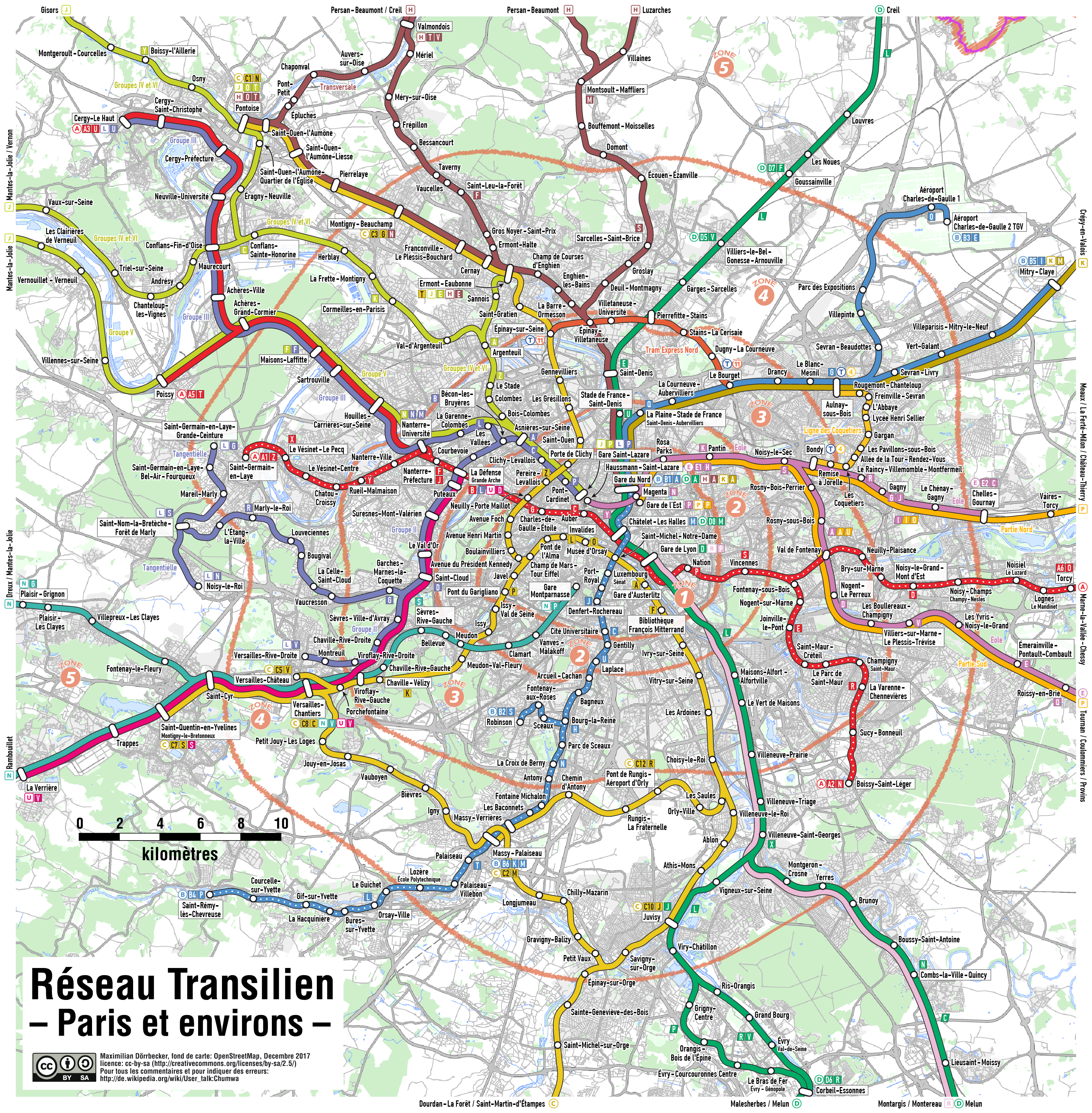
Map detail of the Paris region

The Transilien is divided into six key entities, which are divided according to SNCF guidelines and are unrelated to the departmental boundaries. The lines are then divided into branches which, similarly to the RER, are given letters. However, until 2005, the letters were unknown to the wider travelling public.

The six Transilien entities are:

- Transilien Paris-Nord (Lines H and K)
- Transilien Paris-Saint-Lazare (Lines J and L)
- Transilien Paris-Montparnasse (Line N)
- Transilien Paris-Est (Line P)
- Transilien Paris-Lyon (Line R)
- Transilien Paris-La Défense (Line U)

The system is slightly complicated; each different entity has very different structures. Key complications include:

- The power supplies
- The number of branches
- The lack of onward transportation beyond the termini
- Density of trains on the network
- The mix of traffic on the railway, including express trains, freight trains, long-distance trains, Transilien trains and RER traffic.

The glitches in the network are visible at times when SNCF staff go on strike or serious technical problems occur on the network. Thousands of travellers arrive late for work or even, when there are serious problems, decide not to go into work, which causes a large financial burden to companies.

Because of the extent of the lines, a concentric zoning system is used. Trains that are bound for the outer zones are normally operated as express trains and are nonstop until reaching the outer zones to reduce travel time.

=== Rolling stock ===
The rolling stock used on the Transilien comes from a long evolution of suburban rolling stock. The following stock is used on the network:

- SNCF Class BB 27300
- Voiture de banlieue à 2 niveaux
- SNCF Class BB 17000 (all scrapped on 20 October 2020)
- SNCF Class Z 22500
- SNCF Class Z 50000
- SNCF Class Z 57000

On 16 January 2002, during a ceremony at the Gare de l'Est, SNCF President Louis Gallois, regional prefect Jean-Pierre Duport and Île-de-France Regional Council President Jean-Paul Huchon presented the new liveries of Transilien.

The design used for the rehabilitation and rejuvenation of the fleet was conducted by two outside agencies under contracts awarded in October 2000. RCP Design Global provided exterior design and interior signage, and Avant Première the interior. All vehicles received a new blue and gray Transilien livery with panels of color to highlight doors and internal characteristics. Everything was treated with a graffiti- resistant coating to reduce the impact of vandalism. The trains are equipped with a new ergonomic design of seating, with individual seats instead of the traditional banks. They are covered with vandal-resistant fabric in blue, yellow and red. Circulation and inter-car doors have been modified to improve the distribution of passengers in trains

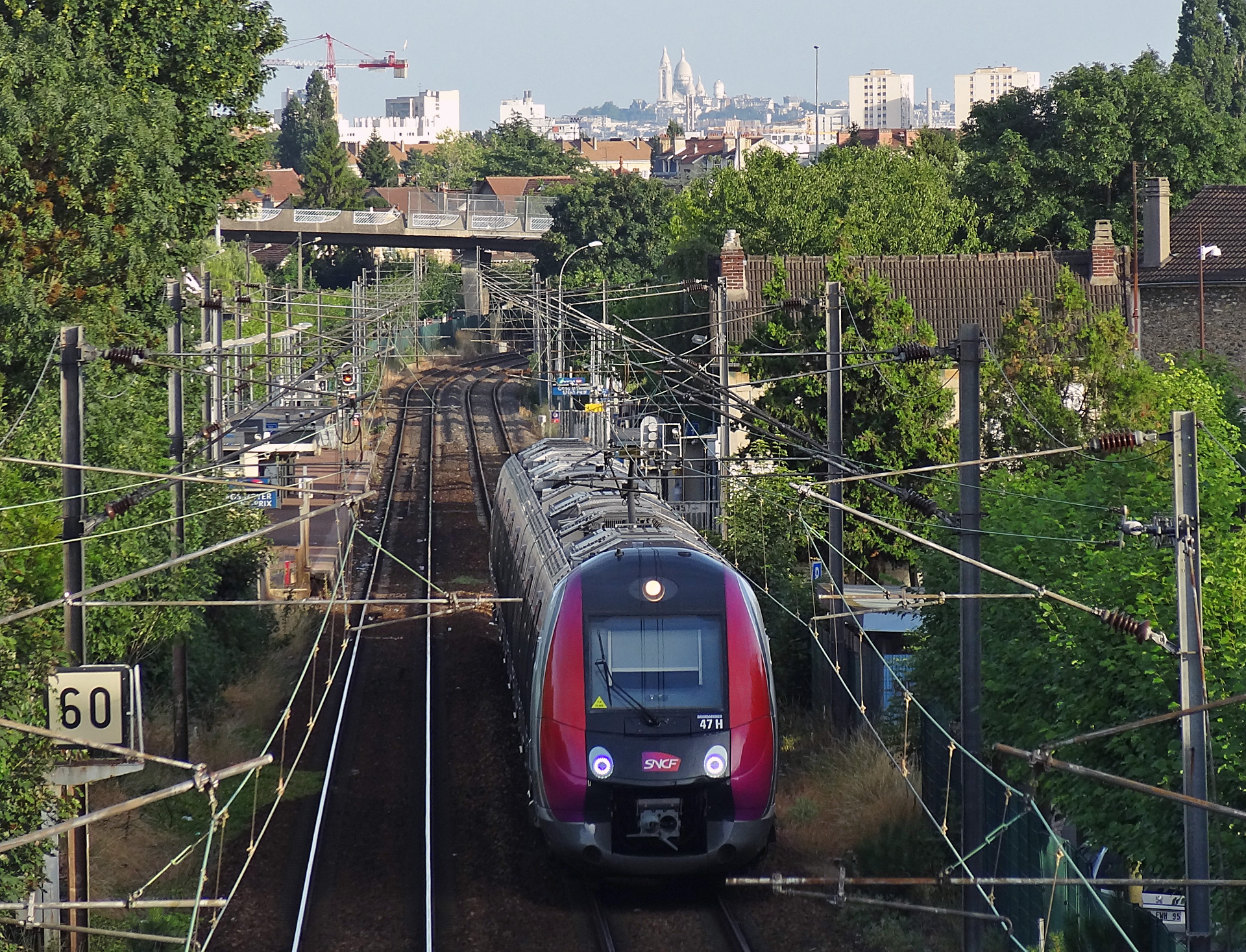
SNCF Class Z 50000 in Ermont

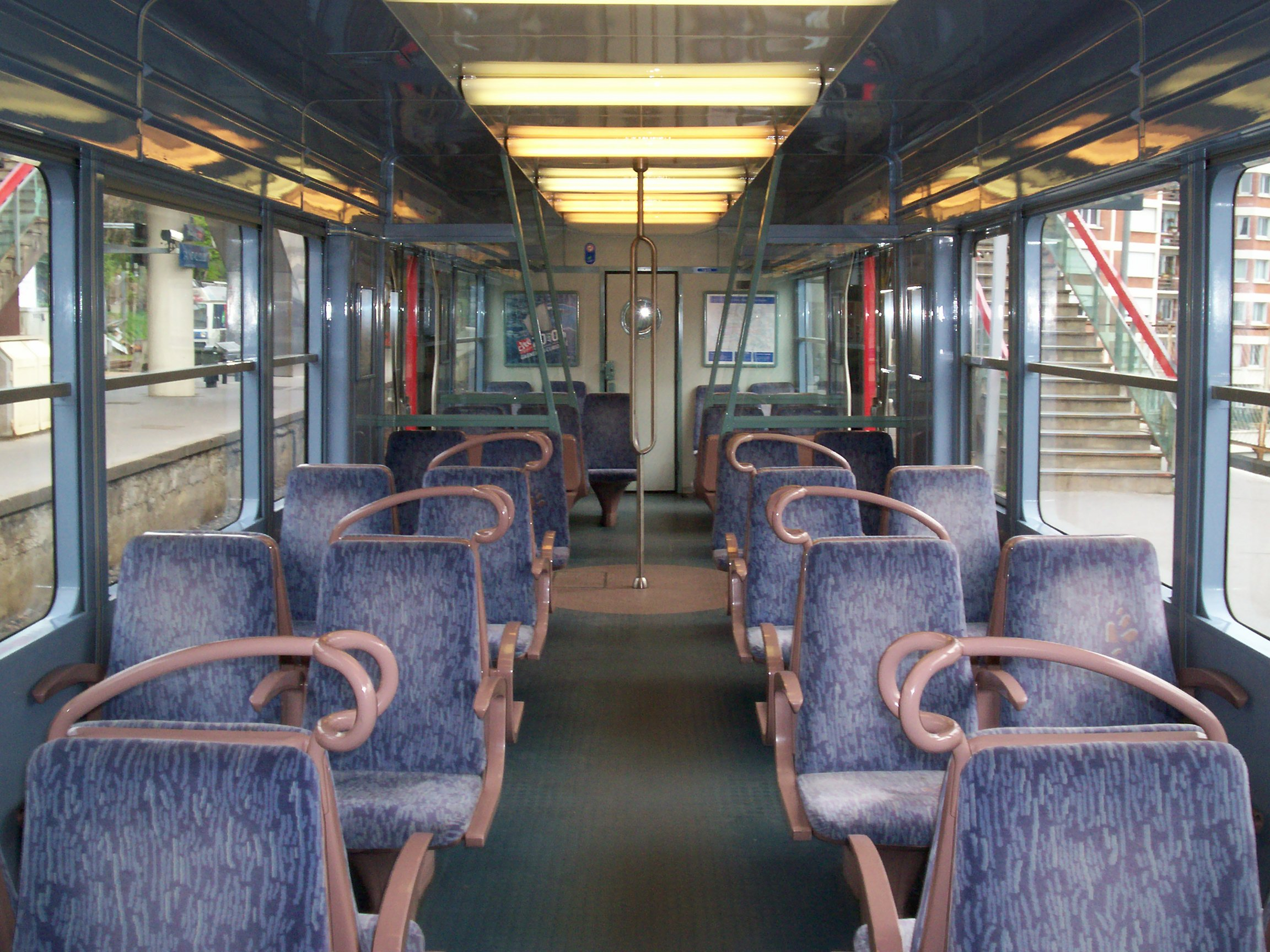
Interior of a Z 6400 train

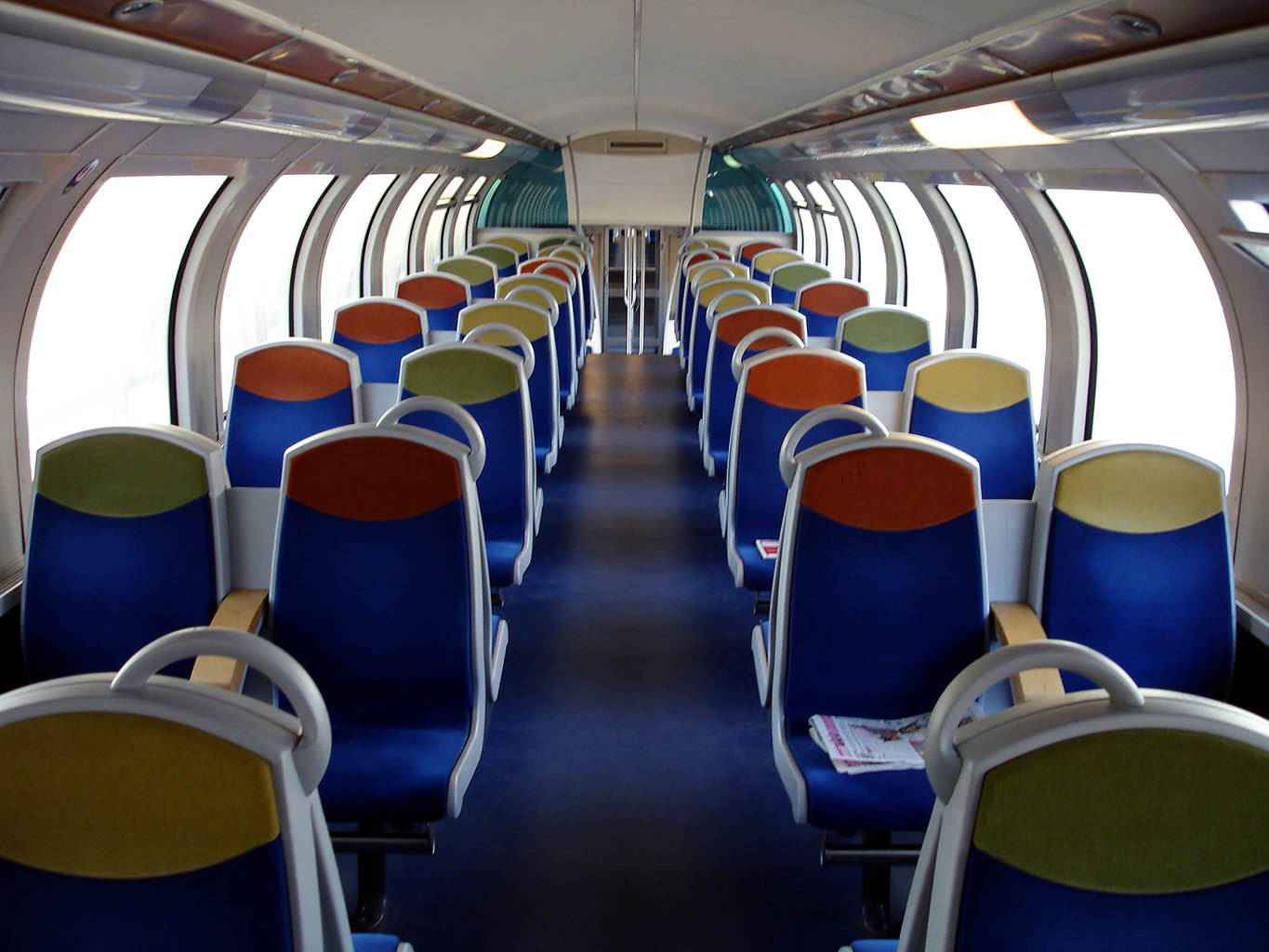
Transilien upper room.

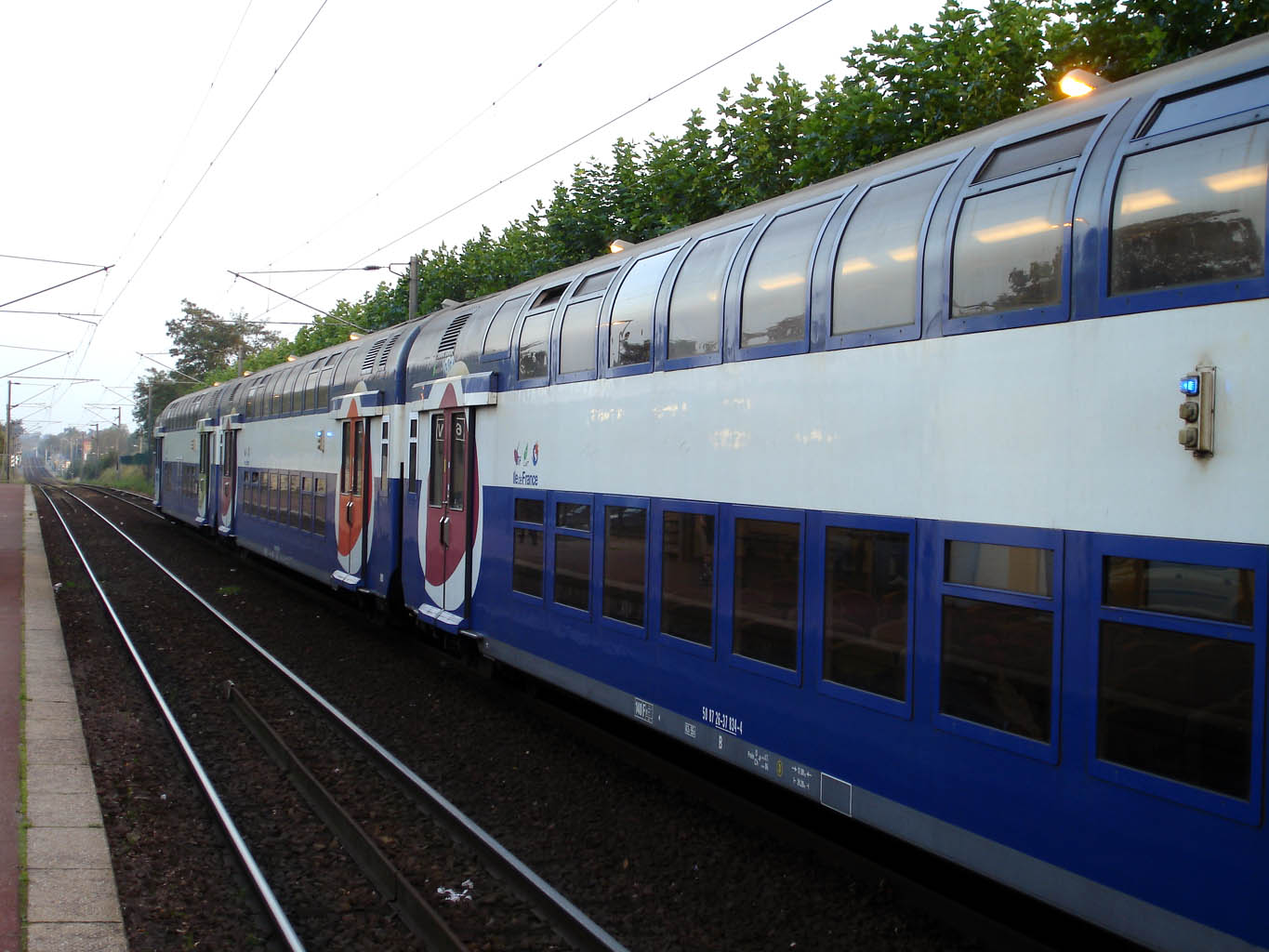
New livery of the Transilien.

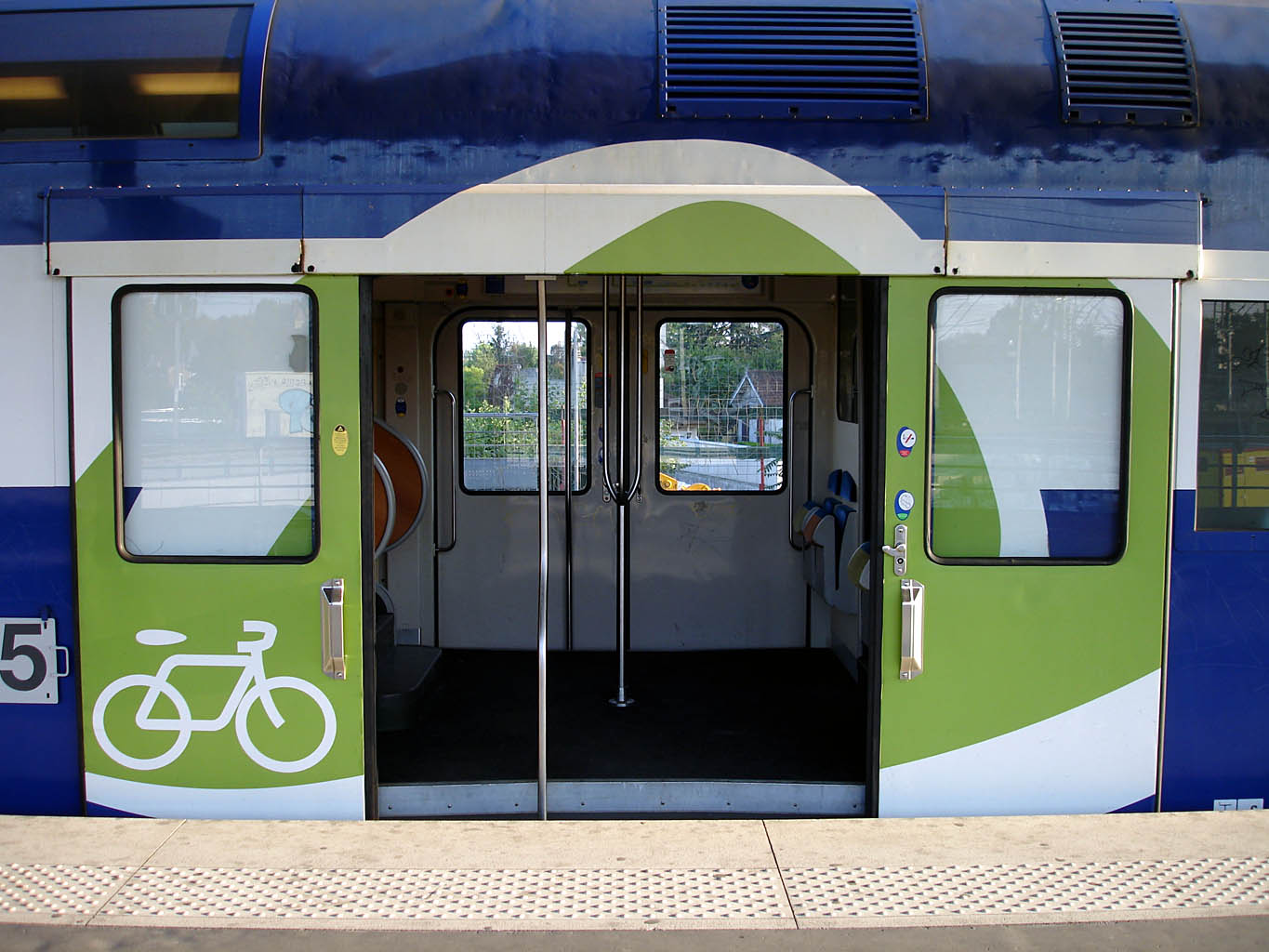
Doors opened.

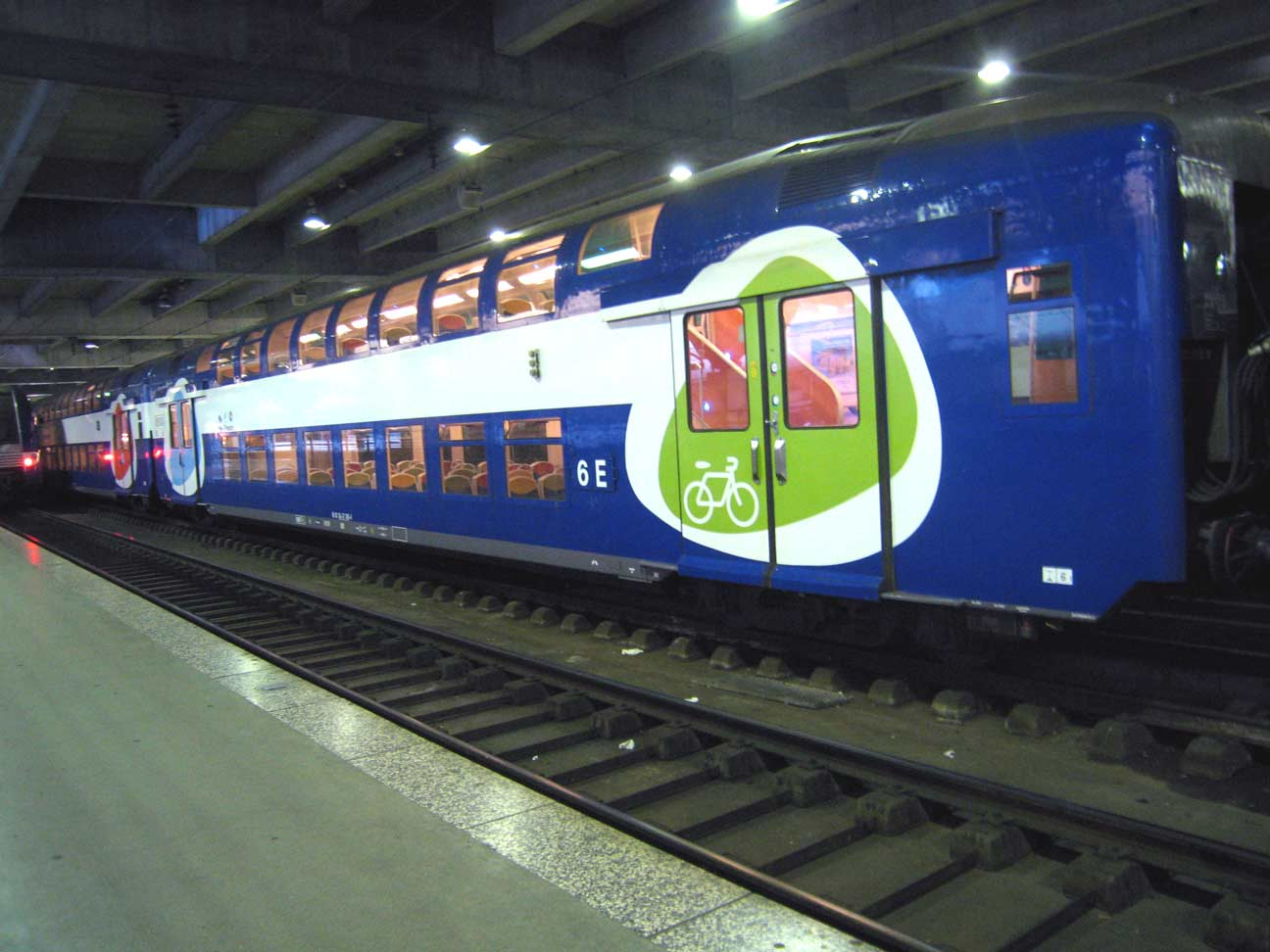
Doors closed.

== Entities ==
Lines of the Transilien network (2018 statistics)
Line		Opened (Note: Dates of railway opening for Transilien lines (the lines were created in 2001 and got their current letters in 2004).)	Length	Stations	Trains per day	Passengers per day
RER RER A	RER A	1969	109 km (68 mi)	46	630	93,756 (Note: Only includes ridership on the branches operated by the SNCF)
RER RER B	RER B	1977	80 km (50 mi)	47	547	340,273
RER RER C	RER C	1979	187 km (116 mi) (Note: Still includes the section from Épinay-sur-Orge to Massy-Palaiseau to Versailles-Chantiers, now part of T12 and Transilien V)	84	531	540,734
RER RER D	RER D	1988	197 km (122 mi)	59	473	615,105
RER RER E	RER E	1999	56 km (35 mi)	22	436	372,716
Transilien Transilien Line H (Paris-Nord)	Transilien H	1846	138 km (86 mi)	56	478	250,458
Transilien Transilien Line J (Paris-Saint-Lazare)	Transilien J	1837	256 km (159 mi)	52	522	268,836
Transilien Transilien Line K (Paris-Nord)	Transilien K	1860	61 km (38 mi)	10	31	16,456
Transilien Transilien Line L (Paris-Saint-Lazare)	Transilien L	1837	76 km (47 mi)	40	730	300,713
Transilien Transilien Line N (Paris-Montparnasse)	Transilien N	1840	117 km (73 mi)	35	277	133,427
Transilien Transilien Line P (Paris-Est)	Transilien P	1849	252 km (157 mi)	38	302	100,947
Transilien Transilien Line R (Paris-Gare-de-Lyon)	Transilien R	1849	164 km (102 mi)	25	120	50,843
Transilien Transilien Line U	Transilien U	1840	31 km (19 mi)	11	91	52,181
Transilien Transilien Line V	Transilien V	2023	15 km (9.3 mi)	7	–	–
Tramways in Île-de-France Île-de-France tramway Line 4	Tram T4	2006	8 km (5.0 mi)	11	365	34,697
Tramways in Île-de-France Île-de-France tramway Line 11	Tram T11	2017	11 km (6.8 mi)	7	314	19,780
Tramways in Île-de-France Île-de-France tramway Line 12	Tram T12	2023	20 km (12 mi)	16	–	–
Tramways in Île-de-France Île-de-France tramway Line 13	Tram T13	2022	19 km (12 mi)	12	–	–

=== "Paris-Montparnasse" lines ===
The trains on this line operate from Gare Montparnasse along the following routes:

- Transilien N
  - Paris Montparnasse – Mantes-la-Jolie via Plaisir-Grignon
  - Paris Montparnasse – Houdan – Dreux (first stop Versailles-Chantiers, then Plaisir-Grignon and then all stations to Dreux)
  - Paris Montparnasse – Rambouillet

=== "Paris-Lyon" lines ===
The trains on this line operate from Gare de Lyon along the following routes:

- Transilien R
  - Paris Lyon – Montereau via Moret-Veneux-les-Sablons
  - Paris Lyon – Souppes-Château-Landon – Montargis
  - Melun – Montereau via Héricy

=== "Paris-Nord" lines ===
The trains on this line operate from Gare du Nord along the following routes:

- Transilien K
  - Gare du Nord – Dammartin Juilly Saint-Mard – Crépy-en-Valois
- Transilien H
  - Gare du Nord – Luzarches
  - Gare du Nord – Persan-Beaumont via Montsoult-Maffliers (Eastern branch) or via Ermont–Eaubonne (Western branch)
  - Gare du Nord – Pontoise – Persan-Beaumont – Bruyères-sur-Oise – Creil

=== "Paris-Est" lines ===
The trains on this line operate from Gare de l'Est along the following routes:

- Transilien P North
  - Paris Est – Meaux
  - Paris Est – Crouy-sur-Ourcq – La Ferté-Milon
  - Paris Est – Nanteuil-Saâcy – Château-Thierry
  - Paris Est – Esbly – Crécy-la-Chapelle
- Transilien P South
  - Paris Est – Longueville – Provins
  - Paris Est – Coulommiers
  - Paris Est – La Ferté-Gaucher

=== "Paris-Saint-Lazare" lines ===
The trains on this line operate from Gare Saint-Lazare along the following routes:

- Transilien J North
  - Paris Saint-Lazare – Cormeilles-en-Parisis
  - Paris Saint-Lazare – Pontoise
  - Paris Saint-Lazare – Chars – Gisors
  - Paris Saint-Lazare – Mantes-la-Jolie par Conflans
- Transilien J South
  - Paris Saint-Lazare – Poissy – Mantes-la-Jolie
  - Paris Saint-Lazare – Port-Villez – Vernon
  - Paris Saint-Lazare – Bréval – Évreux (via Mantes-la Jolie)
- Transilien L North
  - Paris Saint-Lazare – Cergy-le-Haut
- Transilien L South
  - Paris Saint-Lazare – Saint-Cloud
  - Paris Saint-Lazare – Versailles Rive Droite
  - Paris Saint-Lazare – Saint-Nom-la-Bretèche

=== "La Défense – La Verrière" line ===
The trains on this line operate from La Défense station along the following route:

- Transilien U
  - La Défense – La Verrière

== See also ==
- List of Transilien stations
- Tangentielle Nord
- Grande Ceinture line
