= SNCF Class Z 6400 =

Class of 75 former electric multiple unit trains

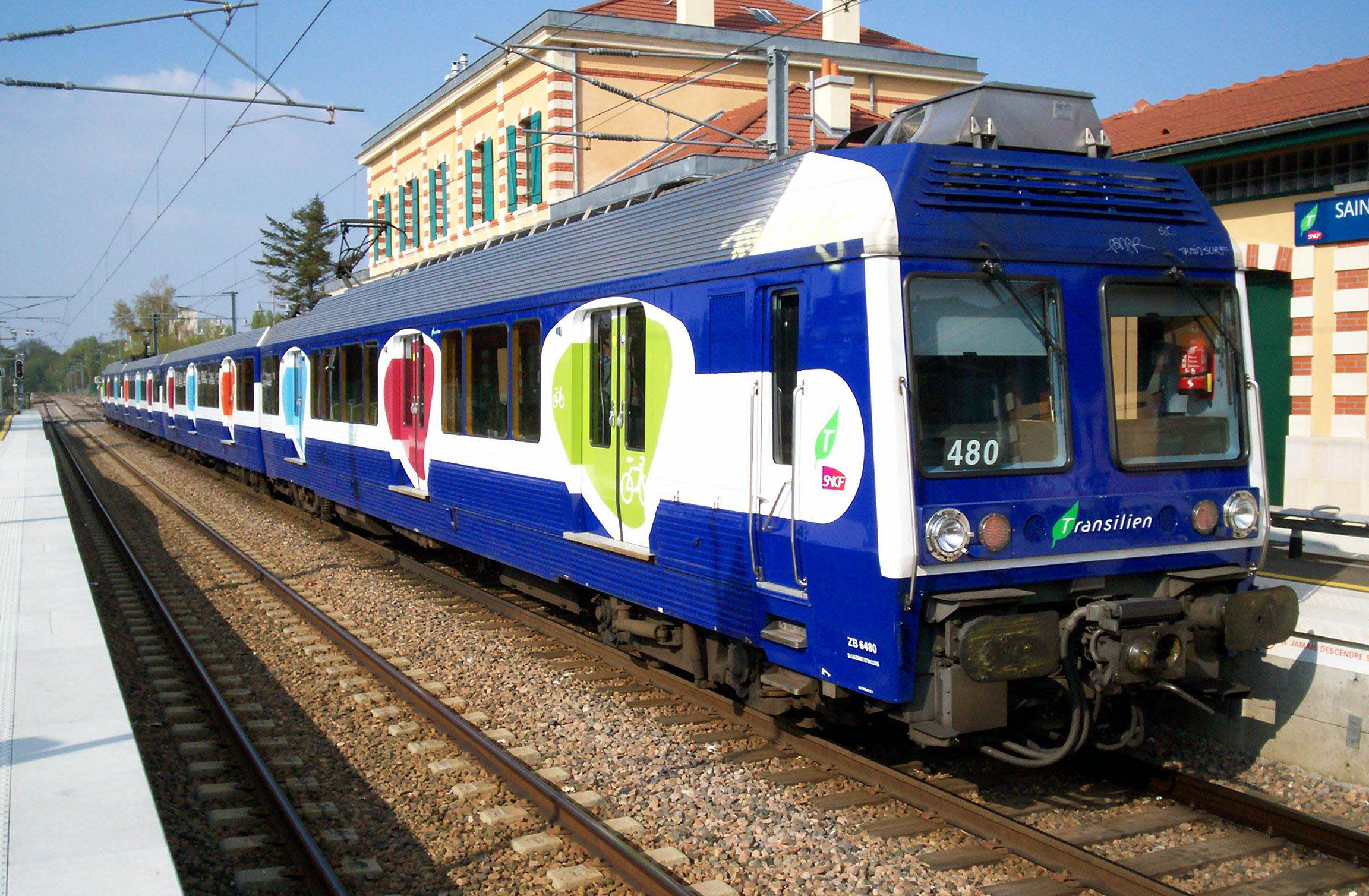
- A refurbished Z6400 EMU in the "Grande Ceinture Ouest" version at Saint-Germain-en-Laye
- In service: 1976–2020
- Manufacturer: Alsthom/Carel et Fouché
- Constructed: 1976–1979
- Refurbished: 1999–2005
- Scrapped: 2018–2021
- Number built: 75 4-car units
- Number in service: 0 (as of 2021)
- Successor: Z 50000
- Formation: 4 cars per trainset
- Operators: SNCF

Specifications
- Train length: 92.430 m (303 ft 2 31/32 in)
- Car length: 15.60 m (51 ft 2 3/16 in) driving trailers, 15.79 m (51 ft 9 21/32 in) middle cars
- Width: 2.95 m (9 ft 8 5/32 in)
- Height: 4.295 m (14 ft 1 3/32 in)
- Doors: 3 pairs per side
- Wheel diameter: 800 mm (31.50 in)
- Maximum speed: 120 km/h (75 mph)
- Traction motors: 8
- Power output: 2,360 kW (3,160 hp)
- Electric system(s): Overhead line, 25 kV 50 Hz AC
- Current collection: Pantograph
- Track gauge: 1,435 mm (4 ft 8 1/2 in) standard gauge

The SNCF Class Z 6400 electric multiple unit trains were built by Alsthom/Carel et Fouché from 1976 to 1979. They were chiefly used in commuter service to the Gare Saint-Lazare in Paris, serving the northwest Paris suburbs.

Seventy-five of these 4-car units were built for use on suburban service in the west of Paris, operating mainly on the Transilien Line L. The 4-car units were most often used in double-formation as 8-car sets. 43 sets had doors arranged for high platforms, while the remainder were for low platforms.

They were progressively replaced by the Class Z 50000 units with the last commercial service of the Z 6400 running on 4 November 2020. This was earlier than originally scheduled due to a downturn in passengers numbers during the COVID19 pandemic.

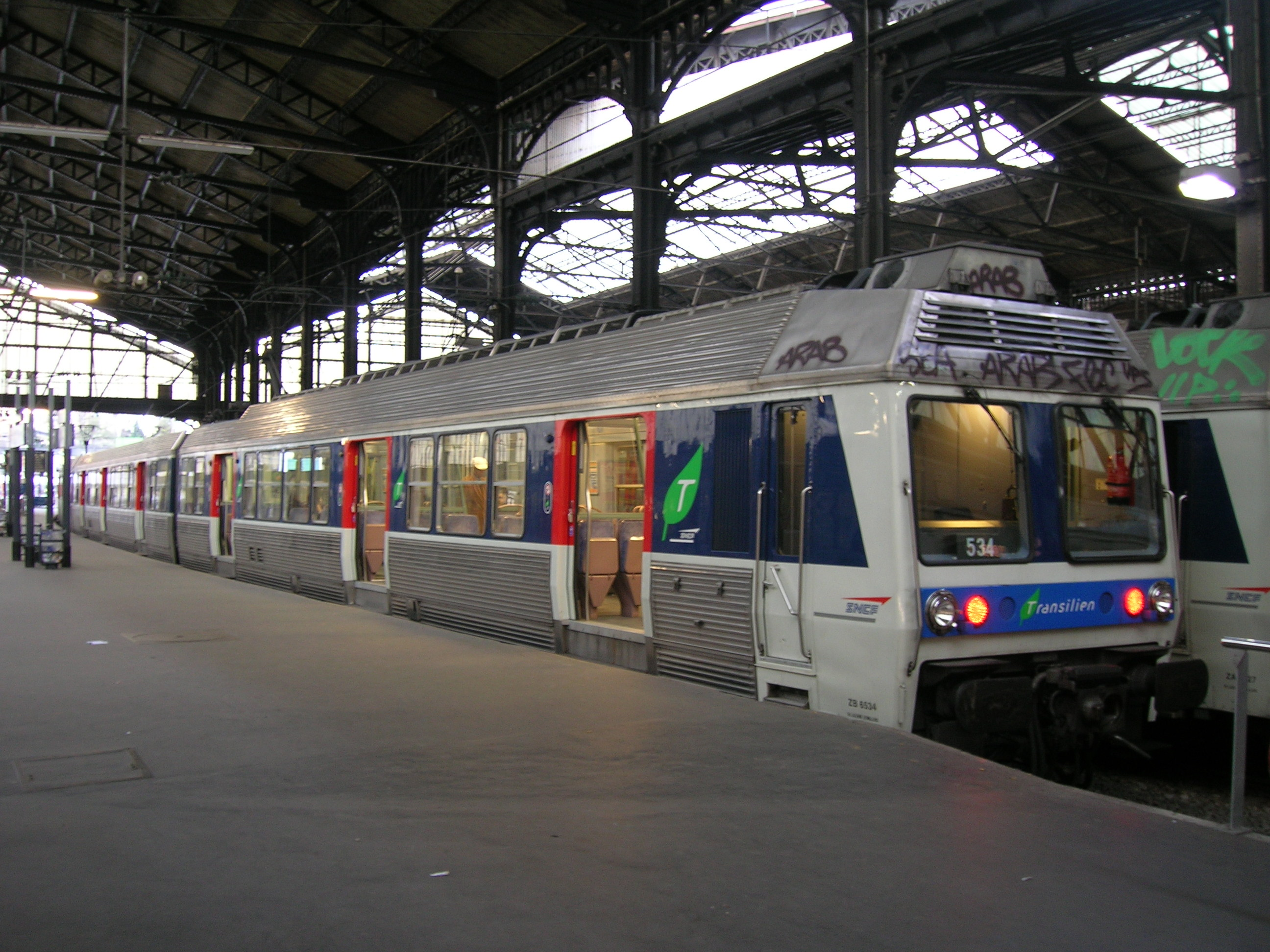
A refurbished Z6400 EMU in the normal version at Paris-St-Lazare.

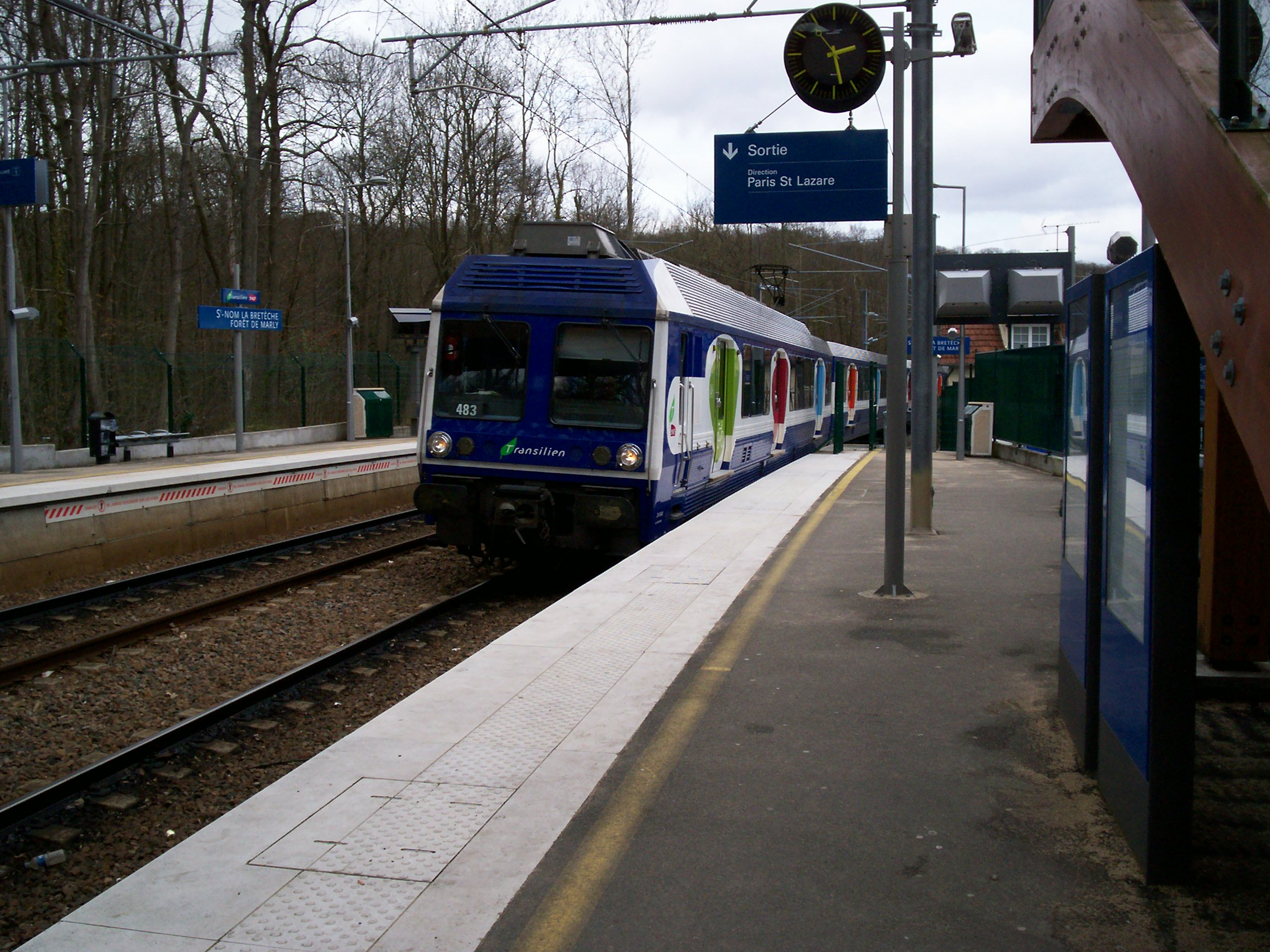
A refurbished set seen heading for Paris-St-Lazare from St Nom la Breteche.

== See also ==
- CPTM (São Paulo commuter rail) operates a partially-forked version of the Z 6400 called CPTM 5000/5400 series (pt), manufactured by the Cobrasma–Francorail consortium in the late-1970s for the then-FEPASA – Ferrovia Paulista S/A on what is now CPTM Line 8
