= Goose game =

Goose game may refer to:

- Untitled Goose Game, a video game
- Game of the Goose, a board game
- Goose Game Museum, a museum in France
