= Delamarche =

Delamarche is a French surname. Notable people with the surname include:

- Charles François Delamarche (1740–1817), French geographer and mapmaker
- Félix Delamarche, French geographer and engineer
- Olivier Delamarche (born 1966), French economic analyst
