= Pierre Simon Jaillot =

French sculptor

- Born: 1631
- Died: 23 September 1681 (aged 49–50)

Pierre Simon Jaillot was a French sculptor of ivory objects born in Avignon-lès-Saint-Claude, Province of Burgundy in 1631, and died on 23 September 1681 in Paris. He was the brother of the geographer Alexis-Hubert Jaillot.

== Biography ==
He was a member of the Academy of Saint-Luc. He was received at the Royal Academy of Painting and Sculpture on 28 May 1661 by presenting an ivory sculpture: A Christ dying on the cross. Of a violent character, he insulted the painter Charles Le Brun and his protector Pierre Seguier, which merited him to be excluded from the academy. His reception piece was offered at the Petites-maisons hospital. He died in his house, Quai des Augustins. On 24 September 1681, he was buried in a religious service held in Saint-André-des-Arcs.

== Works ==
Localized

- London, Victoria and Albert Museum, Figures of a Crucifixion, ivory, 1664; History: de Meymard, parish priest of Saint-Germain-l'Auxerrois, 1787; Fernand Robert, sale Paris, May, 1903; purchased at this sale by Lord Astor, then appears in the sale of Hever Castle, London, Sotheby's, May 4, 1983, n^{o} 332; Acquired by a US collector who can not export the object because the object was prohibited from leaving British territory; Bought in 1983, to the American collector via Sotheby's by the Victoria and Albert museum thanks to L'Art Fund.
- Paris, musée du Louvre, Saint Sébastien, ivory, 0,32 m, 1662, pre-empted on October 11, 2014, in an auction in Dijon.

Not located

- Chermizy-Ailles, (Aisne), Crucifix, 0.48, 1664, disappeared on an uncertain date.
- Paris, church of the Chartreuse de Vauvert, two bronze angels, installed in 1704 2 .
- Paris, Hôpital des Petites-Maisons; Antoine Nicolas Dezallier of Argenville in his Picturesque Voyage, (edition of 1778), indicates that the Christ of 1661 was still in this establishment.
- Private collection, Marie and Saint Jean, ivory dated 1670 exhibited in Florence in 2013 by the antiquarian Alessandro Cesati of Milan during the XXVIII Internazionale Biennale dell'Antiquariato di Palazzo Corsini

== Bibliography ==
(In chronological order)

- Louis Petit de Bachaumont, Secret Memoirs to Serve to the History of the Republic of Letters in France since 1762, Vol 34, Paris, p. 347 .
- Émile Bellier of Chavignerie, Episode existence of an artist, "Monitor the arts", n ^{o} 284, 3 December 1862, p. 2-3 .
- Anatole de Montaiglon Minutes of the Académie Royale, 1648–1793, Paris 1878, p. 13 .
- Malcolm Baker, "Baroque Ivory Carving in France and England", "National Art Collections Review", 1984, p. 106-108 .
- Christian Theuerkauff, "Kleinplastik des Barock: Werke von Jean Gaulette, Michel Mollart und anderen Französischen Zeitgenossen", "Kunst und Antiquitäten", I / 1985, p. 46–53.
- Majorie Trusted, Baroque & Later Ivories, Victoria & Albert Museum, London, 2013, cat. no. 222.
