= Alexis-Hubert Jaillot =

French geographer, cartographer, and publisher

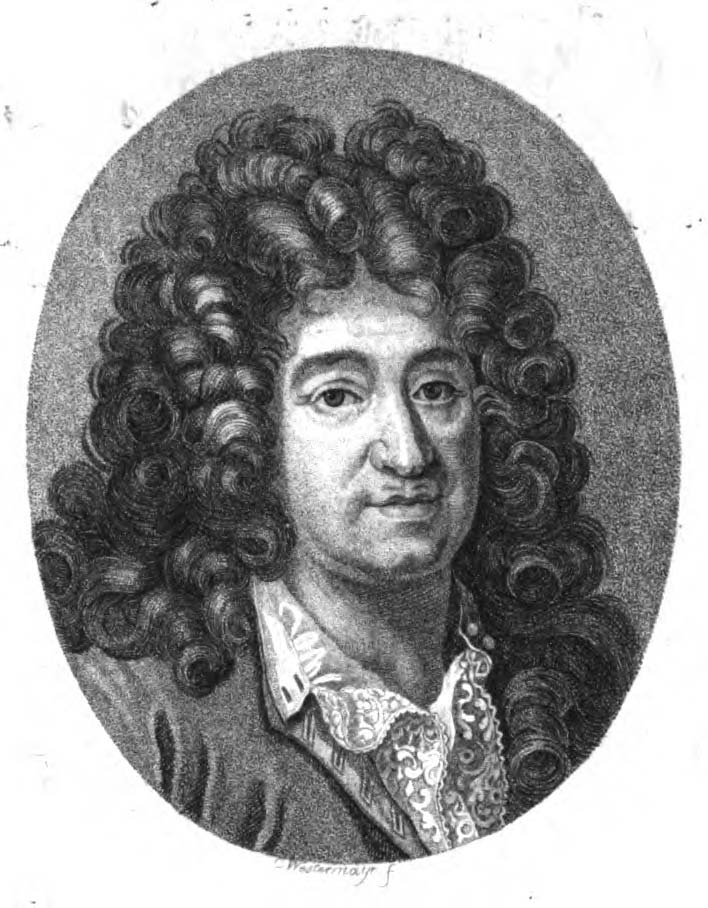
- Portrait by Conrad Westermayr, 1802
- Born: 1632; Avignon-lès-Saint-Claude, Free County of Burgundy, Holy Roman Empire
- Died: 2 November 1712 (aged 79–80); Paris, France

Alexis-Hubert Jaillot (1632 – 2 November 1712) was a geographer and French cartographer, publisher at Paris, from the late 17th century and beginning of the 18th century, in the service of King Louis XIV.

== Biography ==
Born in Saint-Oyand-de-Joux, he died in Paris at his quai of the Augustinians on November 3, 1712. He was the brother of the sculptor on ivory Pierre Simon Jaillot.

== Towards the abbot of Marolles on the brothers Jaillot ==
"Both Jaillot, two admirable brothers,
From the place of Saint-Oyan in the Franche-Comté,
On the yvoire expressing all their will,
Animate it by their hand on contrary subjects.
By Simon one would say that matter endures;
Hubert bends it in the same way,
What use does their lesson benefit?
And who can better form a noble figure? "

Book of the city of Paris .

== Bibliography ==
- Authority Records :International Virtual Authority File •International Standard Name Identifier •National Library of France (data ) •University Documentation System •Library of Congress •Gemeinsame Normdatei •National Library of Spain •Royal Library of the Netherlands •National Library of Israel •National Library of Sweden •WorldCat
- " Atlas françois ", Jaillot, 1692 - 1695, compilation of maps by Nicolas Sanson (cartographer), Edited in Paris and Amsterdam by R and J Ottens.

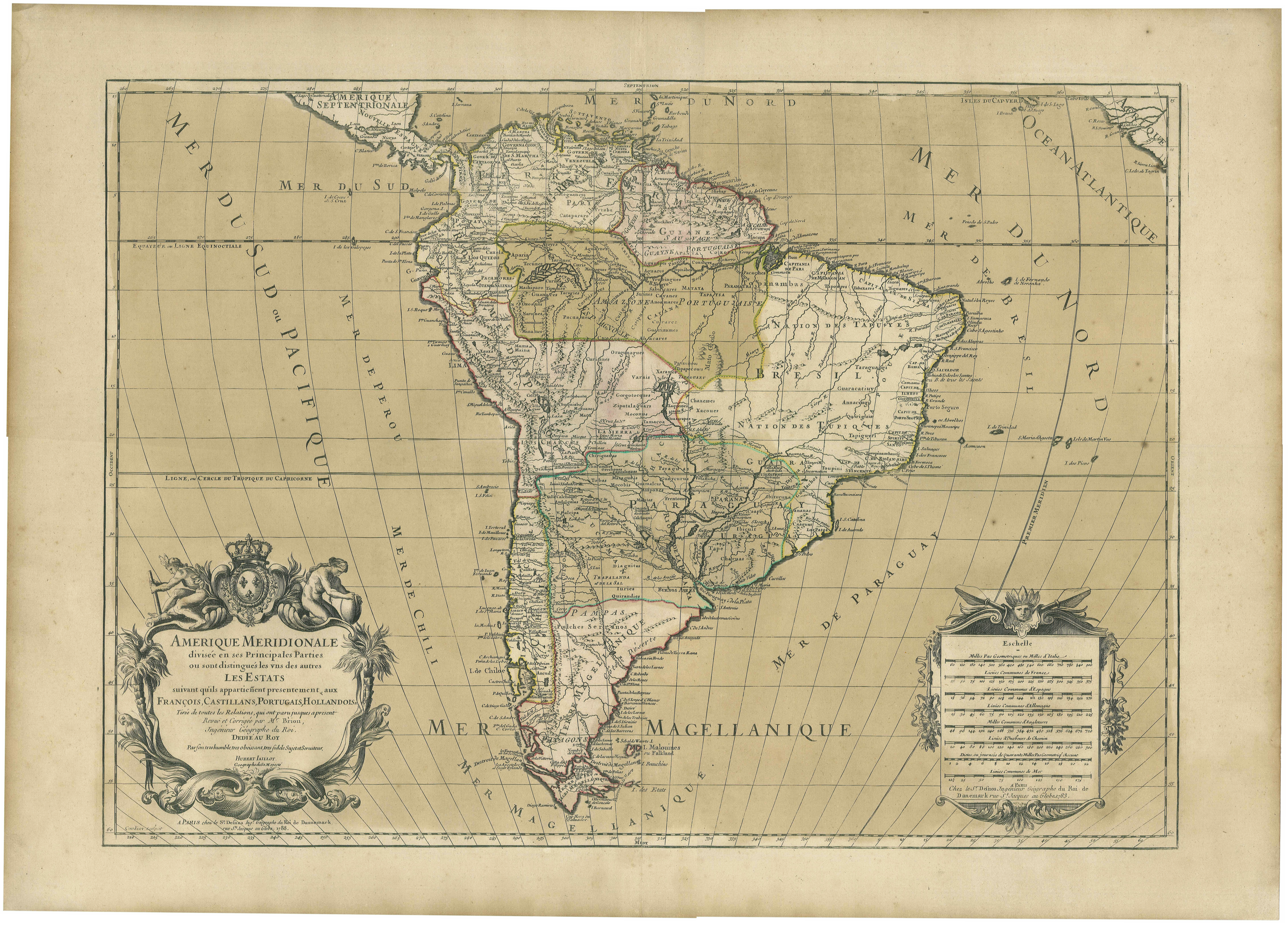
The "South America"

He published numerous works of contemporary geographers as well as his own works. His work will be continued by his son, Bernard Jean Hyacinthe Jaillot (1673-1739), his grandson Bernard Antoine Jaillot, and his brother-in-law, Jean-Baptiste-Michel Renou de Chauvigné dit Jaillot (1710- 1780).

== The Maps of Jaillot ==
Some examples of Jaillot's maps, published alone or in association with Sanson or other authors (excerpt from maps and plans of the historical service of the armies).

== Canada ==
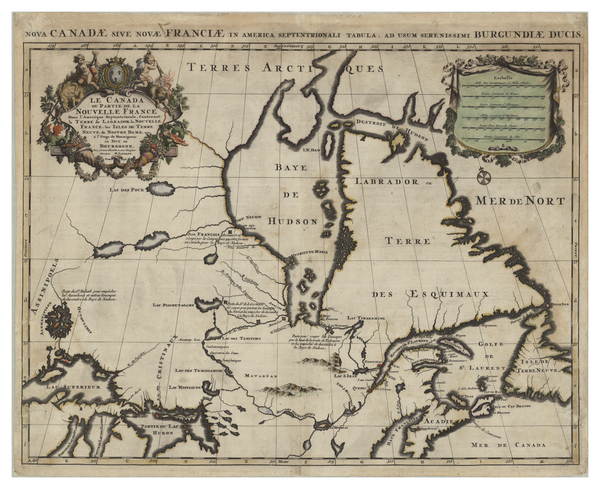
- Map of New France by Alexis Hubert Jaillot (1696)
  Part of New France 1685 ( https://www.flickr.com/photos/manitobamaps/2105367993 [ archive ] ). Map used by Vincenzo Coronelli. It was prepared for Jean-Baptiste Colbert, Marquis de Seignelay in the context of the rivalry of France and England for control of the fur trade of Hudson Bay.

== Europe ==
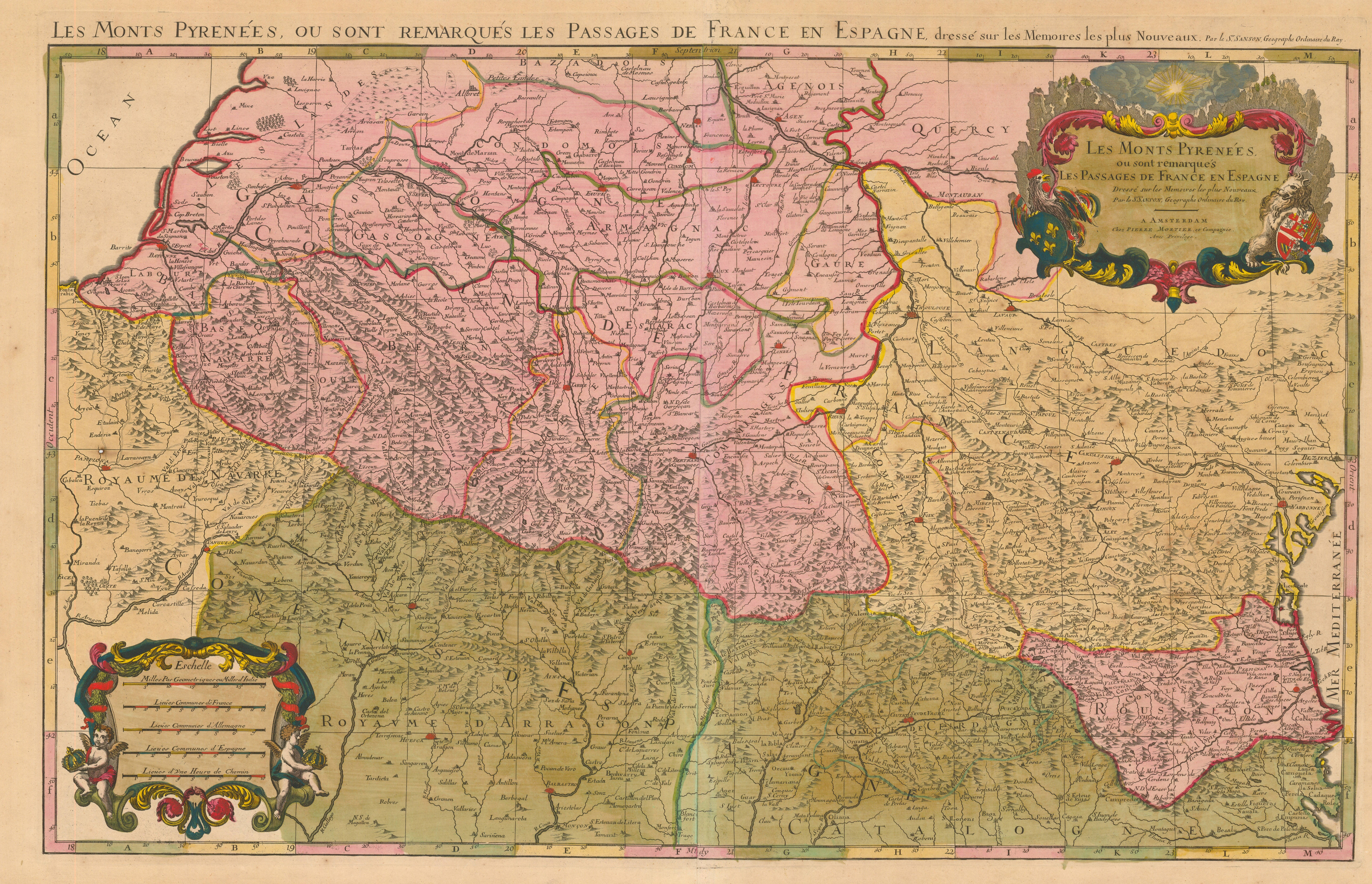
The Pyrenees, probably in 1694

- Europe divided according to the extent of its principal estates subdivided into their principal provinces, Sanson, Jaillot, 1674, 89 x 58.5
- Geographical tables of the divisions of Europe, Sanson, Jaillot, 1679, 60 x 45,
- The Catholic Provinces of the Netherlands distinguished according to whether they are presently divided between the King of France, the King of Spain, and the General Estates of the United Provinces. Jaillot and Sanson, 1689, 56.2 x 88.5
- Europe divided according to the extent of its principal estates subdivided into their principal provinces, Sanson, Jaillot, 1685, 90 x 59, 1688, 89 x 50, 1696, 88 x 57.5, 1706, 128 x 111.5, 1718, 132 x 115
- The Mediterranean Sea divided into the Levant and Ponant Sea, subdivided into its principal parts or seas, where its principal gulfs, capes or promontories, harbors of seas, Sanson, Jaillot, 1685, 86.5 x 57

== France ==
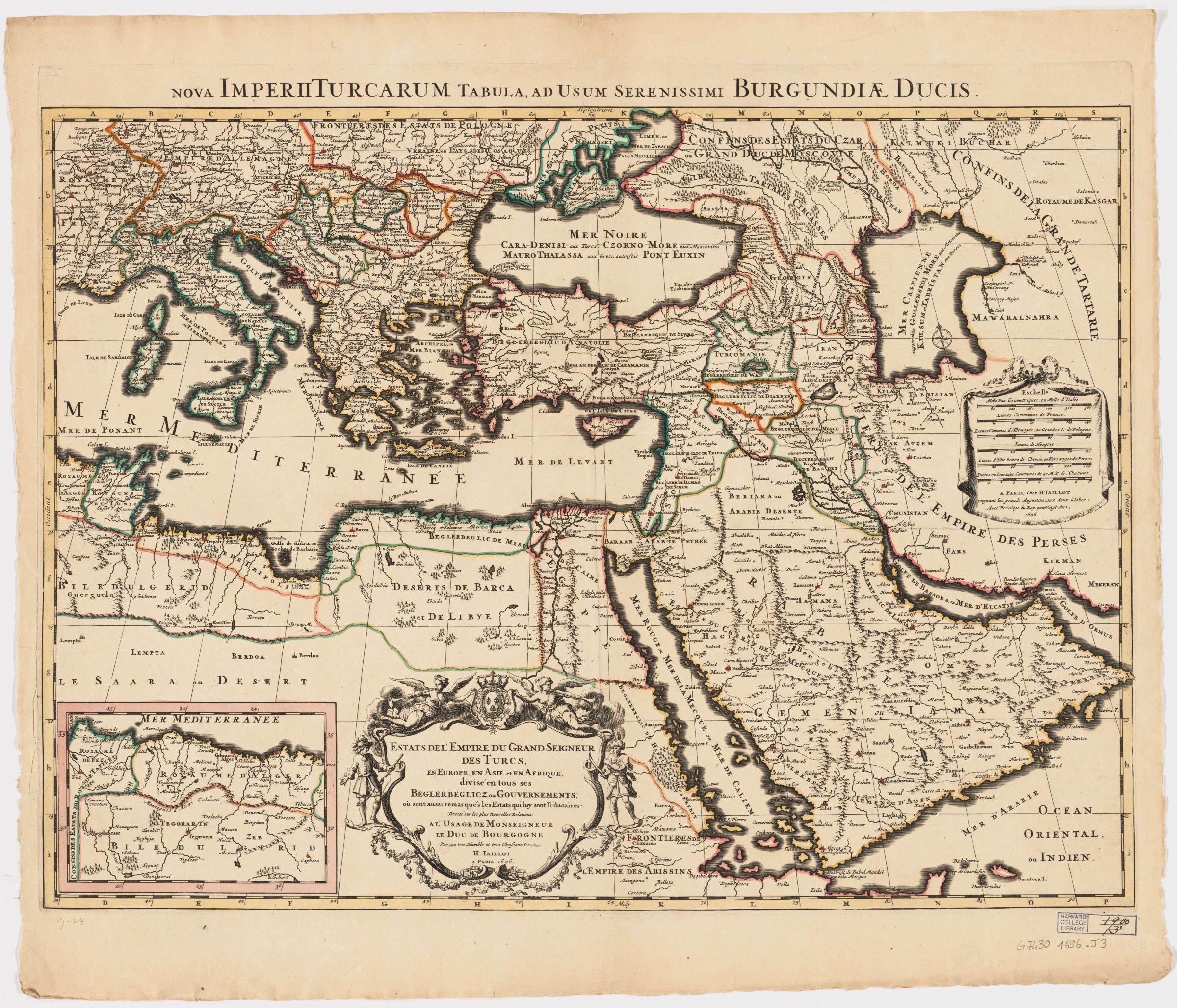
The Ottoman Empire in 1696

- The kingdom of France divided into all its provinces comprised under twelve general governments with its acquisitions in Spain, Italy, Germany and the Netherlands Sanson, Hubert Jaillot, 1680, 1685, 155x120, Engraving containing the "Table Of the divisions of the governments of France according to the general estates ", Sanson, Jaillot, 1679, 59x47, Engraving
- The kingdom of France divided in the departments of the great masters of the waters and forests, Hubert Jaillot, Sanson, 1689, 85x60, Engraving
- The kingdom of France divided into all its provinces, included under 12 governments, according to the States General, isle of France, Lyonnois, Daufiné, Picardie, Brittany, Guienne and Gascony, Languedoc and Provence.
- The kingdom of France, divided into parliaments and sovereign councils, is distinguished from the presidials included in each parliament, the bailiwicks and seneschals, the seats of admiralty, and the chambers of money. Hubert Jaillot [ca1690], 75x79, Engraving.
- Southern part of France . Map of France, Hubert Jaillot, 1699, 64x46
- The kingdom of France distinguished according to the extent of all its provinces and its acquisitions in Spain, Italy, Germany and the Netherlands, Hubert Jaillot, 1700, 65x46
- The kingdom of France drawn up on the memories and new observations of gentlemen of the Royal Academy of Sciences, Hubert Jaillot, 1708, 89x67

== Regions of France ==
- Western lower part of the Levesque of Le Mans, Hubert Jaillot, 1706, 70x52, Boundaries and cities enhanced in watercolor; On the back, the inscription "Diocese of Le Mans in 4 flles, by Jaillot, 1706
- Upper western part of the Evesche du Mans, Hubert Jaillot, 1706, 70x52, Borders and cities enhanced in watercolor;
- Lower eastern part of the Levesque eagle, Hubert Jaillot, 1706, 70x52, Borders and cities enhanced with watercolor.
- The evesch of Le Mans : upper eastern part of the Levese of Le Mans, Hubert Jaillot, 1706, 70x52. Carries the title cartridge of the set; " Dedicated to Monseigneur Louis de Lavergne-Montenard de Tressan, councilor of the King in all his councils of state and private, cy-front chaplain of His Royal Highness the late Duke of Orleans, the King's only brother By his very- Humble and very obedient servant Hubert Jaillot , ordinary engineer of His Majesty "; Borders and cities enhanced with watercolor.
- Map of the Nantes Scholar, Hubert Jaillot, 1706, 59 x 46, Borders and coasts enhanced with watercolor; Dedication to "Monseigneur the illustrious and reverend Messire Gilles de Bauvau, Evesque de Nantes" by G. de Lambilly.
- The diocese of Toulouse, Hubert Jaillot, 1695, 68x46. Engraving dedicated to " ... Messire Jean Baptiste Michel Colbert Archbishop of Toulouse " Cartouche with arms of the archbishop; Borders enhanced with watercolor; Center with a pencil.
- The diocese of Montpellier divided into nine archpriestz, Hubert Jaillot, nd, 53x43. Dedicated engraving " Monsignor Charles Joachim Colbert, bishop of Montpellier " and featuring his arms whose borders are enhanced in watercolor and which is gridded in pencil.
- The diocese of Castres, Hubert Jaillot, 1695, 63x41. Engraving of a card dedicated to " Monseigneur Augustin de Maupeou, councilor of the Roy in his councils, Bishop of Castres "; Borders enhanced with watercolor; Table of the locks of the canal of the river Agout. (Link) [ archive ]
- France divided by provinces or are exactly noticed all the roads of the posts of the kingdom according to which they are now established, Hubert Jaillot, ca 1680, engraving
- General map of the positions of France with communication stations in Flanders, Hainault, Artois, Alsace, Lombardy and pulled the original Mr. Jaillot corrected and increased in the year 1738 . N. Jaillot, 1738 . Engraving with highlights of acquerelle, published in 1745 by the heirs of Homan; The original title is in Latin.
- Map of the posts of France drawn up by order and dedicated to Monseigneur Marc Pierre de Voyer of Paulmy Count of Argenson ..., N. Jaillot, 1748 . Engraving with highlights.
- Postal maps of France for the present year (where the French departments appear), N. Jaillot, ca 1790 . Engraving used as background for a map of France divided between its departments. Departments are colored in pencil and numbered; A table of 83 departments frames the map.
- The county of Hainaut divided into French and Spanish; The Cambresis. N. Sanson, H. Jaillot, 1674, Engraving
- The Map of Cambresis, Hondius, Jaillot, 1668, Engraving.
- The map of the duchy of Normandy divided into seven dioceses and its seven royal bailiwicks. Hubert Jaillot, 1682. Engraving whose title appears manuscript, including some highlights of colors.
- The general government of Normandy divided into its three generalities to know Rouen, Caen and Alençon and subdivided in its thirty elections, B. Jaillot, ca 1700 . Engraving with an insert on the Channel Islands and a cartouche with the arms of France.
- The frontiers of Lorraine and the county of Burgundy, the upper Alsace divided into bailiwicks and lordships, Jaillot, H. Sengre, 1705, 87 x 44
- The estates of the Duke of Lorraine, Jaillot, 1700, 140 x 130, 1734, 137 x 131
- Le Toulois, where are the chatelleries and provosts of the temporel of the bishopric of Toul and its chapter, Jaillot, nd, 67 x 47
- The Duchies of Lorraine and Bar and the bailliages of the temporal, Jaillot, 1781, 58 x 4
- Alsace divided into its principal parts, Jaillot, 1675, 82 x 57
- The Franche-Comté divided into three great bailiwicks, Jaillot, 1677, 82 x 57, 1681, 84 x 57
- Brittany divided into its nine bishops, Jaillot, 1706, 65 x 47
- The generality of Tours divided into its sixteen elections, Jaillot, 1711, 75 x 46
- The elections in the generality of Tours, Jaillot, 1711, 74 x 45
- Northern part of the duchy and general government of Burgundy, Jaillot, 1708, 70 x 48
- Generalities of La Rochelle Divided into five elections, namely: La Rochelle, St Jean d'Angely, Marennes, Cognac and Saintes, Jaillot, 1722, 71,5 x 52,5
- The election of Lomagne, part of those of Armagnac of river Verdun, Montauban, Cahors and part of the generality of Bordeaux, Jaillot, nd, 64,5 x 47
- The elections of Comenge, of Estarac, part of those of Verdun and Armagnac, the country of the four valleys, the Nebouzan and the county of Foix, Jaillot, nd, 75.5 x 47
- The Generalites of Montauban and Toulouse . The Donazan, the country of Sault, the Fénouilledes, the Corbières. Part of the generality of Montpellier. Hubert Jaillot, 1695, 46 x 74.5. Dedicated to Monseigneur Le Goux de La Berchère .
- The elections of Millau, Rodez, Villefranche, Figeac, part of those of Cahors and Montauban. The boundaries of the generalities of Limoges and Riom. Hubert Jaillot, 1695, 64.5 x 47
- Provence divided into its vigueries and adjoining lands, Jaillot, nd, 65 x 45

== Italy ==
- Italy divided according to the extent of all its sovereignties, which are the estates of the Church of the Catholic King, Sanson, Jaillot, 1672, 90 x 59, 1680, 87 x 59
- Italy distinguished according to the estates of all estates, kingdoms, republics, duchies, principalities, H. Jaillot, Sanson, v. 1690, 65 x 45.5
- Italy following the degrees of the Academy of Sciences of Paris, Jaillot, Sanson, 1714, 18 x 14,5
- Italy divided according to its estates, Kingdoms, Republics, Principalities, Duchies, Jaillot, Sanson, 1708, 64 x 46,5
- Italy divided into its principal estates, kingdoms, and republics, or are exactly noticed all the roads of the posts as they are now established, Jaillot, 1718, 61 x 50
- The provinces of Veronese, Vincentin, Padua, Jaillot, 1702, 72 x 48
- Estat of the lordship and republic of Venice in Italy, Jaillot, 1706, 72 x 48
- The duchy of Milan in all its extent divided into its principal parts with the estates and the borders which surround it, Jaillot, 1702, 68 x 51, 1706, 25 x 19, 1734, 68 x 51
- The kingdom of Naples divided into twelve provinces on the newest memoirs, Jaillot, 1679, 54.5 x 44. Lipari Islands, Corfu, Albania.
- The kingdom of Naples, Jaillot, 1706, 87.5 x 73.5
- The Sicily divided into 3 provinces or its valleys. Valle di Demona, valle di Noto, valle di Mazara and isles of Lipara or windmills, Jaillot, 1709, 54,5 x 41

== Spain ==
- Spain according to the extent of all its kingdoms and principalities, Jaillot, 1711, 110 x 88, 1781, 113 x 89
- Spain, according to the extent of all its kingdoms and principalities, included under the crowns of Castile, Aragon, and Portugal, Jaillot, 1716, 112 x 88. Map quadrille on all the left half.
- Spain in all its kingdoms and principalities, Jaillot, 1721, 65 x 46

== Turkey, Asia and Africa ==
- Estates of the empire of the Turks in Europe, Jaillot, 1672, 88 x 59, 1695, 65 x 45
- Asia divided into its principal regions, and where the extent of the empires, monarchies, kingdoms, and estates which presently share Asia, may be seen, Jaillot, 1719, 134 x 115. Africa distinguished in its principal parts, the Barbary, the Bilidulgerid, Egypt, Saara or desert, the land of negroes, Guinea, Nubia, Abyssinia, the Zanguebar, Congo, Monomotapa, Monoemugi, Kaffraria, Sanson Jaillot, 1719, 113, 5 x 93
- Africa divided according to the extent of its principal parts, Sanson Jaillot, 1749, 64 x 49.

== See also ==
- Jean-Baptiste-Michel Renou de Chauvigné dit Jaillot
