= Rambouillet =

Commune in Île-de-France, France

- Subprefecture and commune
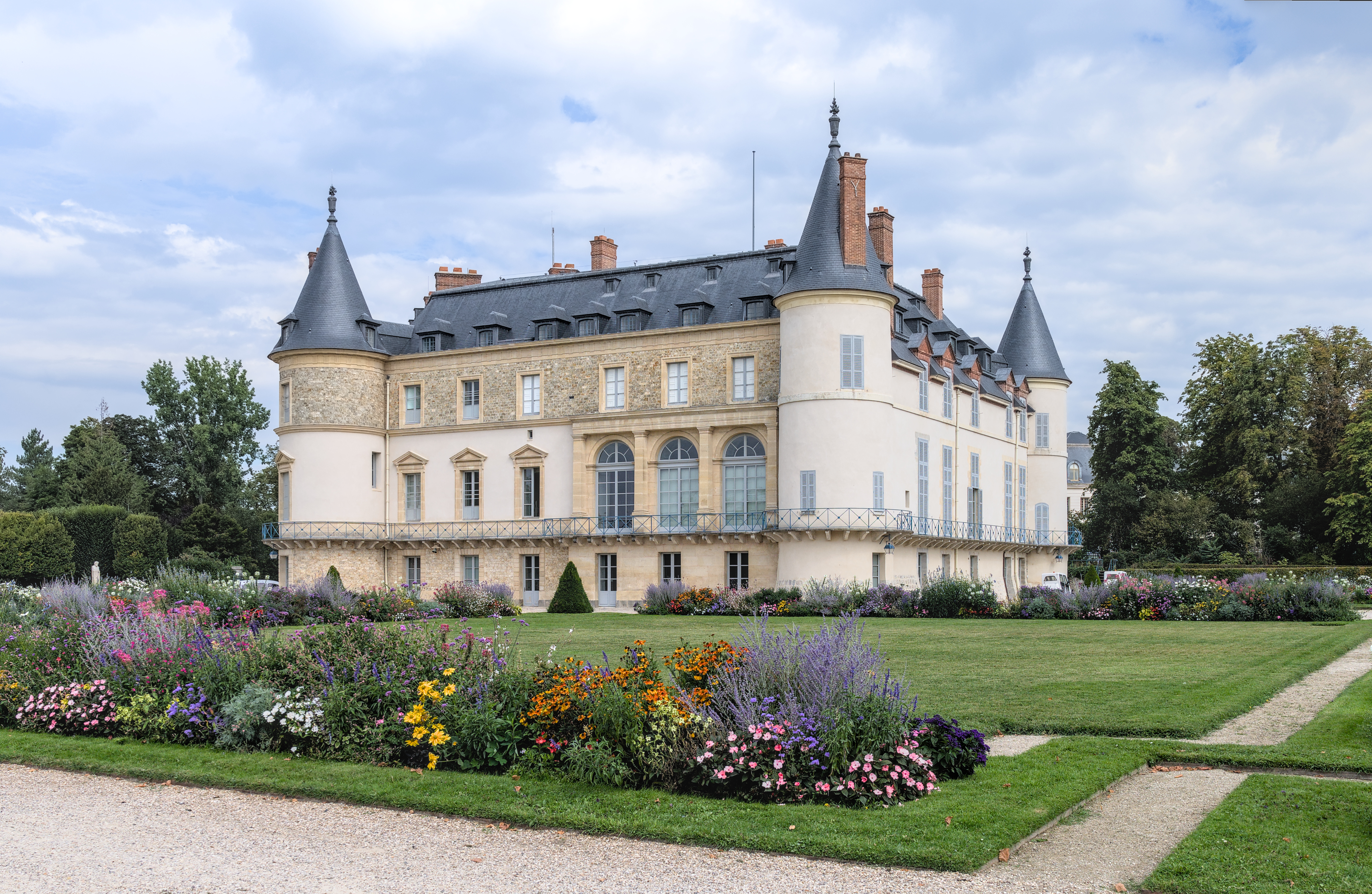
- The Château de Rambouillet, an occasional diplomatic venue and former presidential summer residence

- Coat of arms
- Location of Rambouillet
- Location within France Location within Île-de-France (region)
- Coordinates: 48°38′40″N 1°49′51″E
- Country: France
- Region: Île-de-France
- Department: Yvelines
- Arrondissement: Rambouillet
- Canton: Rambouillet
- Intercommunality: CA Rambouillet Territoires

Government
  - Mayor (2020–2026): Véronique Matillon
- Area^{1}: 35.19 km^{2} (13.59 sq mi)
- Elevation: 142 m (466 ft)
- Highest elevation: 177 m (581 ft)
- Lowest elevation: 142 m (466 ft)
- Population (2023): 27,724
  - Density: 787.8/km^{2} (2,040/sq mi)
- Demonym: Rambolitains
- Time zone: UTC+01:00 (CET)
  - Summer (DST): UTC+02:00 (CEST)
- INSEE/Postal code: 78517 /78120
- Website: rambouillet.fr
- ^{1} French Land Register data, which excludes lakes, ponds, glaciers > 1 km^{2} (0.386 sq mi or 247 acres) and river estuaries.

Rambouillet (UK: /rɒ̃ˈbuːjeɪ/, US: /ˌrɒmbuːˈjeɪ/; French: [ʁɑ̃bujɛ]) is a commune and subprefecture of the Yvelines department in the Île-de-France region of France. It is located beyond the outskirts of Paris, 44.3 km (27.5 mi) southwest of its centre. As of 2023, its population was 27,224.

Rambouillet lies on the edge of the vast Forest of Rambouillet (Forêt de Rambouillet or Forêt de l'Yveline); it is famous for its historical castle, the Château de Rambouillet, which hosted several international summits, including the 1st G6 summit and 1999 Rambouillet conference. Due to its proximity to Paris and Versailles, Rambouillet has long been an occasional seat of government. Rambouillet station is on the Paris–Brest railway.

== Population ==
Historical population

Year	Pop.	±% p.a.
1793	3,105	—
1800	2,657	−2.20%
1806	2,597	−0.38%
1821	2,949	+0.85%
1831	3,147	+0.65%
1836	3,006	−0.91%
1841	3,835	+4.99%
1846	4,089	+1.29%
1851	4,130	+0.20%
1856	4,363	+1.10%
1861	4,258	−0.49%
1866	3,971	−1.39%
1872	4,725	+2.94%
1876	4,750	+0.13%
1881	5,186	+1.77%
1886	5,633	+1.67%
1891	5,897	+0.92%
1896	6,090	+0.65%
1901	6,176	+0.28%

Year	Pop.	±% p.a.
1906	6,165	−0.04%
1911	6,484	+1.01%
1921	6,223	−0.41%
1926	6,720	+1.55%
1931	7,001	+0.82%
1936	7,267	+0.75%
1946	7,446	+0.24%
1954	8,923	+2.29%
1962	11,387	+3.09%
1968	14,505	+4.12%
1975	18,941	+3.89%
1982	21,438	+1.78%
1990	24,343	+1.60%
1999	24,758	+0.19%
2007	26,157	+0.69%
2012	25,833	−0.25%
2017	26,736	+0.69%
2023	27,224	+0.30%

Source: EHESS and INSEE (1968–2023)

== Transport ==
Rambouillet is served by the SNCF Rambouillet railway station on the Transilien Line N suburban rail line, and on the regional line to Chartres and Le Mans.

== Features ==
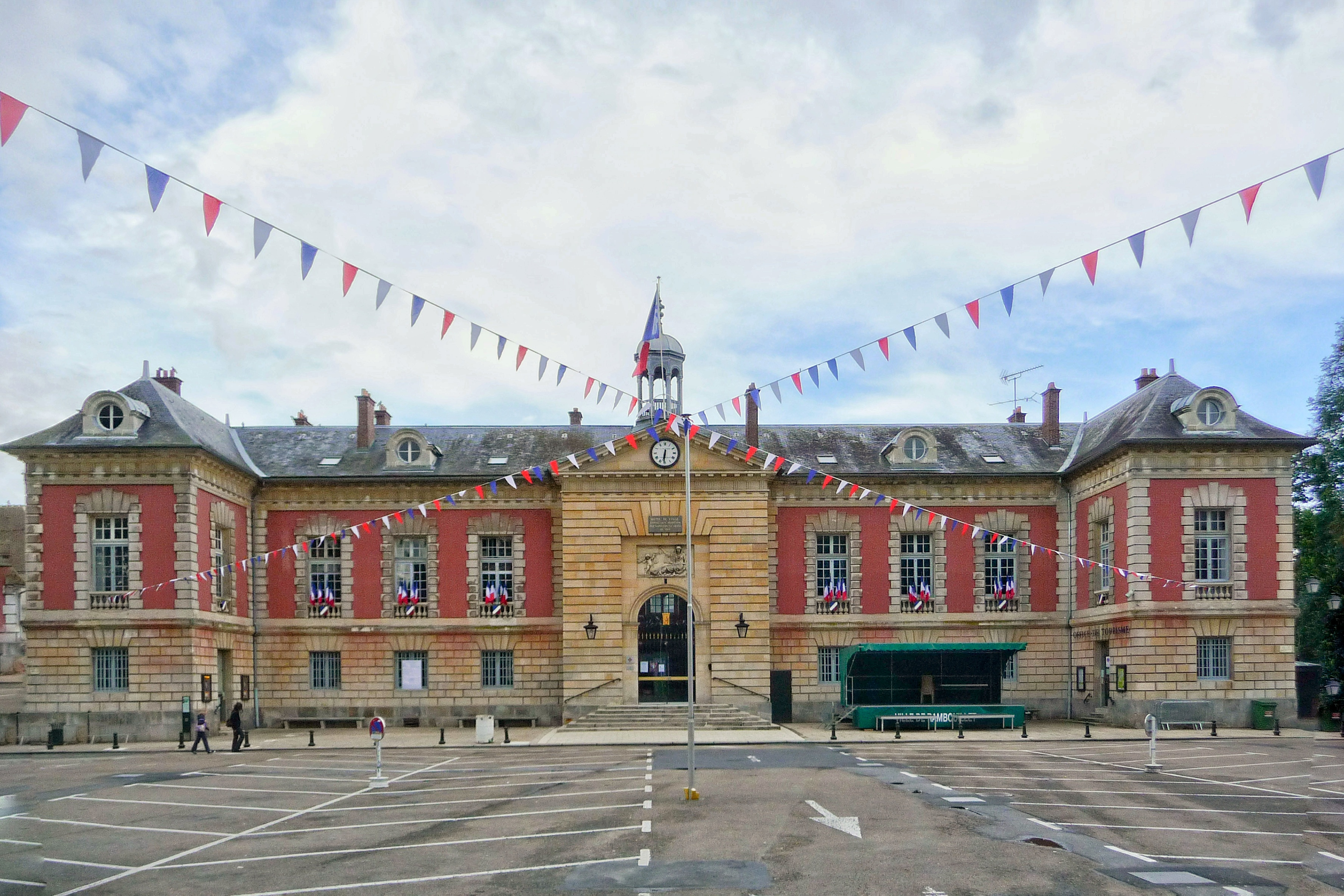
The Hôtel de Ville

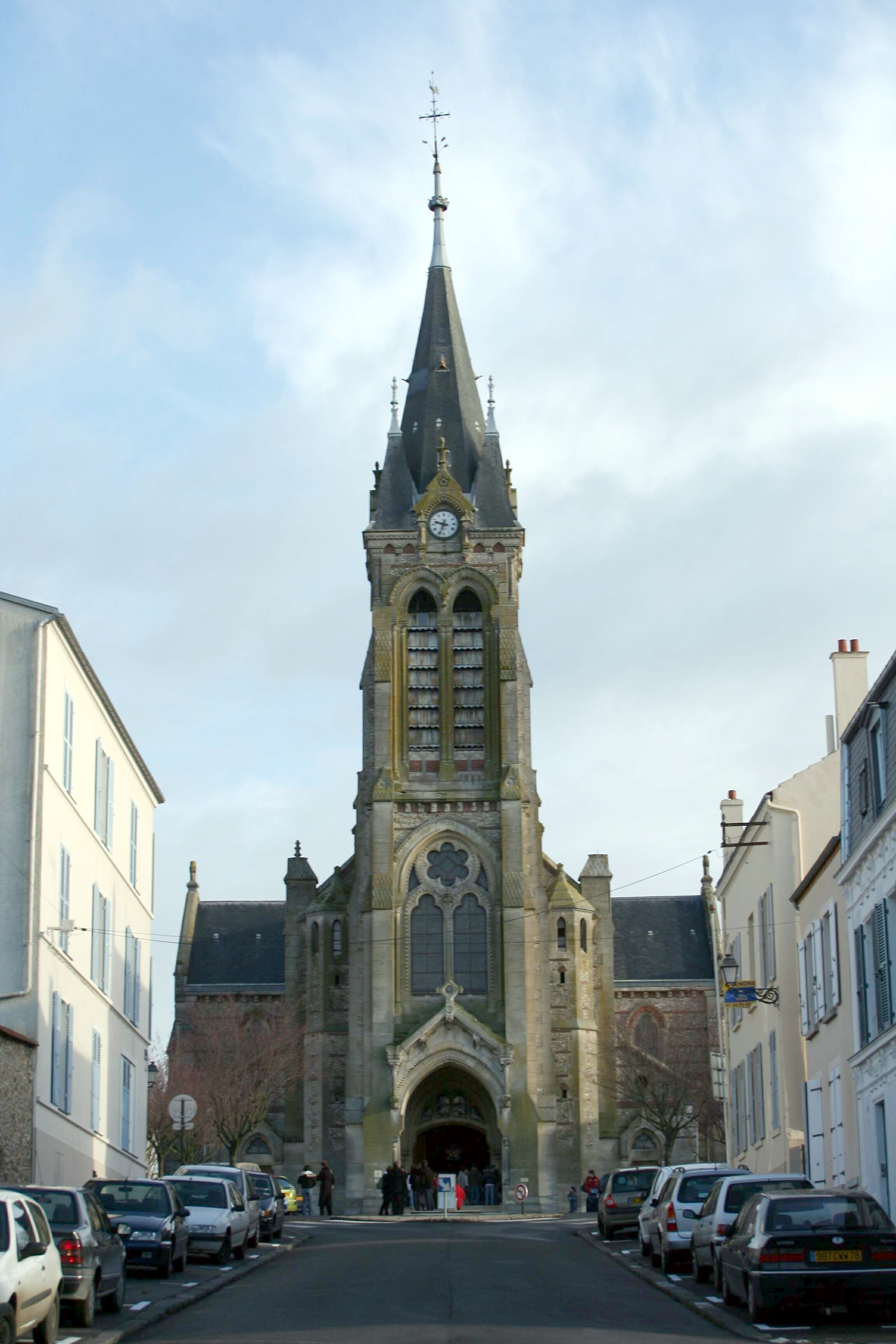
The Church of Saint-Lubin

- The Château de Rambouillet, a former medieval fortress, was acquired by Louis XVI in 1783 as a private residence because of its ideal situation in the game-rich forest of Rambouillet. It became a bien national during the French Revolution of 1789, and one of the imperial residences of Napoléon I during the First French Empire. At the time of the Bourbon Restoration, the castle became a royal residence, and it is there that Charles X signed his abdication on 2 August 1830. Sometimes neglected at times of political unrest, the château de Rambouillet became the official summer residence of the French President of the Republic after President Félix Faure chose it as summer residence for himself and his family in 1896; Rambouillet thus became the official summer residence of the Presidents of the Third Republic and has retained its position ever since.
- The Palace of the King of Rome was erected in 1784, on a parcel adjacent to the gardens of the castle. Louis XVI had ordered the construction of the Hôtel du Gouvernement, which was restored during the reign of Napoléon I, and renamed Palais du Roi de Rome as the official Rambouillet residence of Napoleon's infant son Napoleon II. Its entrance is situated in the rue Charles de Gaulle, Rambouillet's main street.
- The Hôtel de Ville, the former Bailliage (Bailiwicks building) was built in 1787 at the request of Louis XVI to a design by the architect Jacques-Jean Thévenin. It was given by Napoléon I to the inhabitants of Rambouillet to serve as their town hall. The inscription over the doors of the City Hall reads "Donated to the inhabitants of Rambouillet by Napoleon the Great, [in the] Year 1809".
- The new Church of Saint-Lubin was built between 1868 and 1871. Its architect was Anatole de Baudot, a student of Eugène Viollet-le-Duc.
- The Bergerie nationale was built on the grounds of the Domain of Rambouillet at the request of Louis XVI, and is the home of the Rambouillet Merino sheep since 1786.
- The Laiterie de la Reine, the Queen's Dairy also built on the grounds of the Domain of Rambouillet, is adjacent to the Bergerie. It was built in 1787 at the request of Louis XVI for his wife Marie Antoinette and designed by the architect Jean-Jacques Thévenin.
- The Chaumière des coquillages, a thatched-roof cottage with its marble interior decorated with shells and mother of pearl, was built in 1779–1780 in the English garden of the Domain of Rambouillet by Claude-Martin Goupy, the architect of the duc de Penthièvre, for the princesse de Lamballe, Penthièvre's widowed daughter-in-law.
- The Musée Rambolitrain, situated across from the Saint-Lubin church, is a museum featuring miniature trains. We find a faithful reconstruction of a Parisian toy store of the 1930s.
- The Médiathèque La Lanterne, situated across from the Saint-Lubin church and the Musée Rambolitrain, is a media library and a concert hall. Link
- The Monument Américain (The American Eagle Monument), is situated at the south entrance of the town on the D 906 road to Chartres, at the site of two ambushes in which seven American soldiers were killed, on 16 August 1944. The monument was erected in 1947. It bears the inscription: "À la mémoire des soldats américains tombés pour la libération de notre région en août 1944", "In memory of the American soldiers fallen for the liberation of our region in August 1944". The names of nine American soldiers are inscribed on a plaque on the monument. Commemorative ceremonies are held at the monument every 19 August.
- Goose Game Museum, a former museum in Rambouillet, dedicated to the Game of the Goose.

== Notable people ==
who were born in Rambouillet

- Louis Jean Marie de Bourbon, duc de Penthièvre, grandson of Louis XIV
- Ulysse Chevalier (1841–1923), bibliographer and historian
- Robert Benoist (1895–1944), Grand Prix motor racing driver and war hero
- Jérémie Aliadière, former Arsenal football player, now with FC Lorient

who lived in Rambouillet

- François Ier, king of France, died at the castle, supposedly in the tower
- Charles de Sainte-Maure, duc de Montausier and his wife Julie d'Angennes, the daughter of Charles d'Angennes and Catherine de Vivonne
- Louis-Alexandre de Bourbon, comte de Toulouse, legitimated son of Louis XIV and Madame de Montespan, and father of the duc de Penthièvre
- Louis Jean Marie de Bourbon, duc de Penthièvre, grandson of Louis XIV, and son of the comte de Toulouse
- Maria Teresa d'Este, wife of the duc de Penthièvre, died in childbirth
- Princesse de Lamballe, duc de Penthièvre's daughter-in-law, killed in the September massacres of 1792 during the French Revolution
- Napoleon, Emperor of the French
- Charles X, king of France, who signed his 1830 abdication in the castle
- G. Lenotre, French author and historian
- Ernest Hemingway, American writer and journalist, lived a few days in Rambouillet in August 1944
- Charles de Gaulle
- Sébastien Faure, Anarchist activist and pedagogue, who set up La Ruche ("The Beehive") free school near Rambouillet in 1904
- Didier Pironi, Professional racing driver
- Gérard Larcher, former mayor of Rambouillet, Senator of the Yvelines, President of the Senate (reelected in October 2017), and several times minister
- Jacqueline Thome-Patenôtre, Politician, member of the National Assembly for Seine-et-Oise and later Yvelines from 1958 to 1973. She was also Mayor of Rambouillet from 1947 to 1983.

who died in Rambouillet

- François Ier, king of France, died in castle in 1547
- Louis-Alexandre de Bourbon, comte de Toulouse, son of Louis XIV and father of the duc de Penthièvre, died in castle in 1737
- Maria Teresa d'Este, wife of the duc de Penthièvre, died in childbirth in castle in 1754
- Germaine Coty, née Corblet, wife of French president René Coty, died at the château de Rambouillet on 12 November 1955
- Georges Wilson, French film and television actor and director, died at the Rambouillet hospital on 3 February 2010.

== Education ==
Schools in the commune include:

- Eight pre-schools (écoles maternelles): Arbouville, Bel-Air, Clairbois, du Centre, Les Jardins, la Gommerie, de La Louvière, and La Ruche
- Seven elementary schools: Arbouville, Clairbois, Gambetta, La Louvière, La Prairie, Saint Hubert, and Vieil Orme
- Three junior high schools: Collège Catherine de Vivonne, Collège Le Racinay, and Collège Le Rondeau
- Lycée Louis Bascan, a public senior high school/sixth-form college

Private schools include:

- Institution Sainte Thérèse, which includes pre-school, elementary, junior high, and high school
- École Jacinthe et François (private elementary school)
- Collège Saint Jean Bosco (private junior high school)

Universities:

- University Institute of Technology of Vélizy
- Versailles Saint-Quentin-en-Yvelines University

== International relations ==
Rambouillet is twinned with:

- Great Yarmouth, England, United Kingdom (1956)
- Kirchheim unter Teck, Germany
- Torres Novas, Portugal
- Waterloo, Belgium
- Zafra, Spain

== See also ==
- Duchy of Rambouillet
- Antoine Sartorio
- Communes of the Yvelines department
