= Goose Game Museum =

Museum in France

- Musée du Jeu de l’Oie
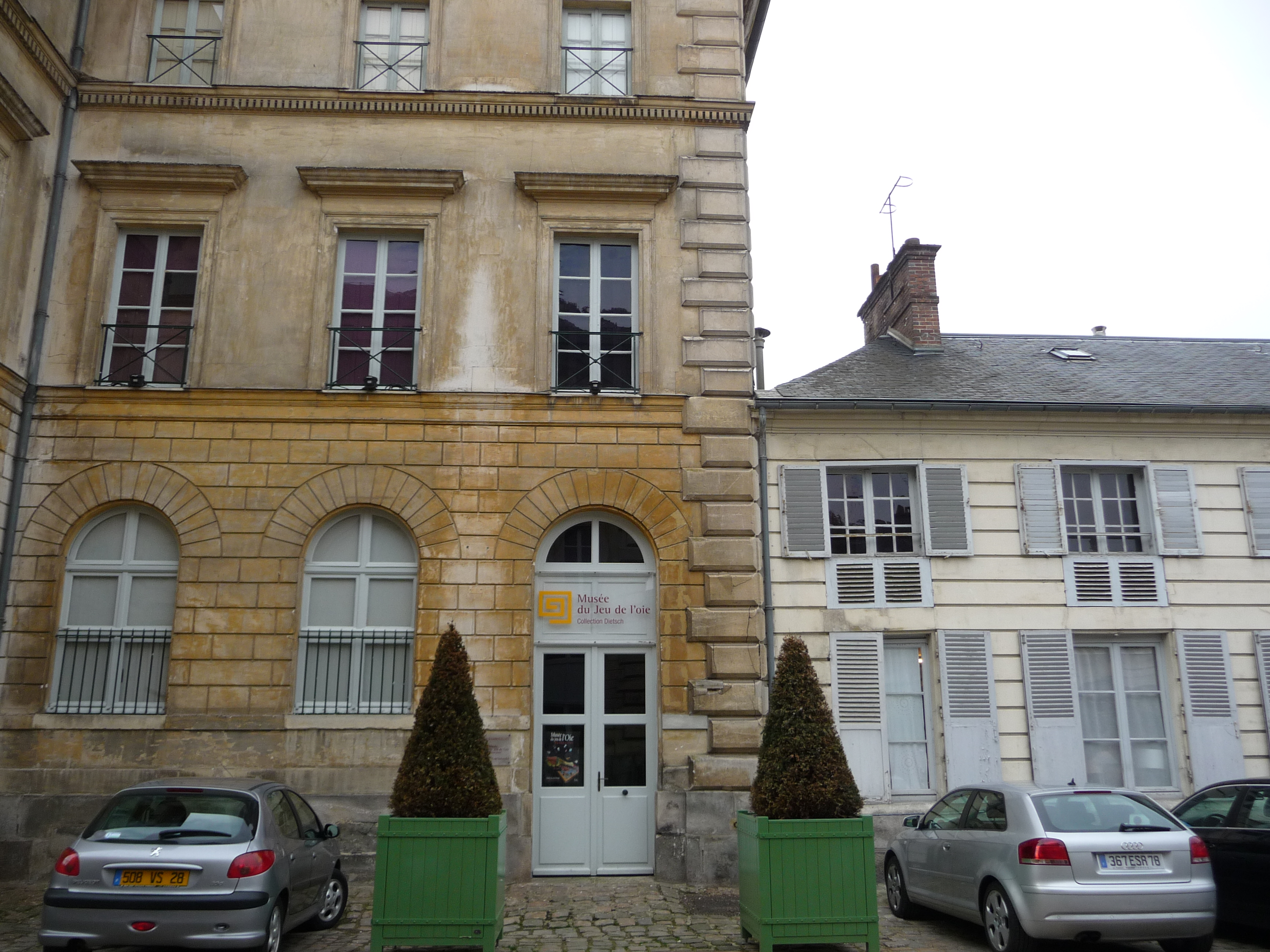
- Facade of the museum in Rambouillet
- Established: April 6, 2001
- Dissolved: 2011
- Location: Rambouillet, Yvelines, France
- Type: Toy museum / Game museum
- Collection size: ~2,500 games
- Founder: Pierre Dietsch
- Public transit access: Rambouillet station (Transilien Line N)

The Goose Game Museum, located in Rambouillet (Yvelines), France, housed the collection of Pierre Dietsch. The collection was exhibited from 2001 to 2011; it is now kept in storage.

== History and description ==
The Pierre-Dietsch collection, consisting of 2,500 goose games, is one of the largest in the world. Pierre Dietsch, an Alsatian polytechnician, built this collection over thirty years during his travels in Europe; he died in 1999 (on 17 February), shortly after depositing his games with the town of Rambouillet. This deposit led to the opening of the Goose Game Museum on 6. 80 goose games, both French and foreign were permanently displayed until the museum's closure in 2011. The collection, purchased in 2008, remains in the possession of the city hall.

The museum was located in a restored wing of the Palais du Roi de Rome, in the center of Rambouillet.

== Gallery ==
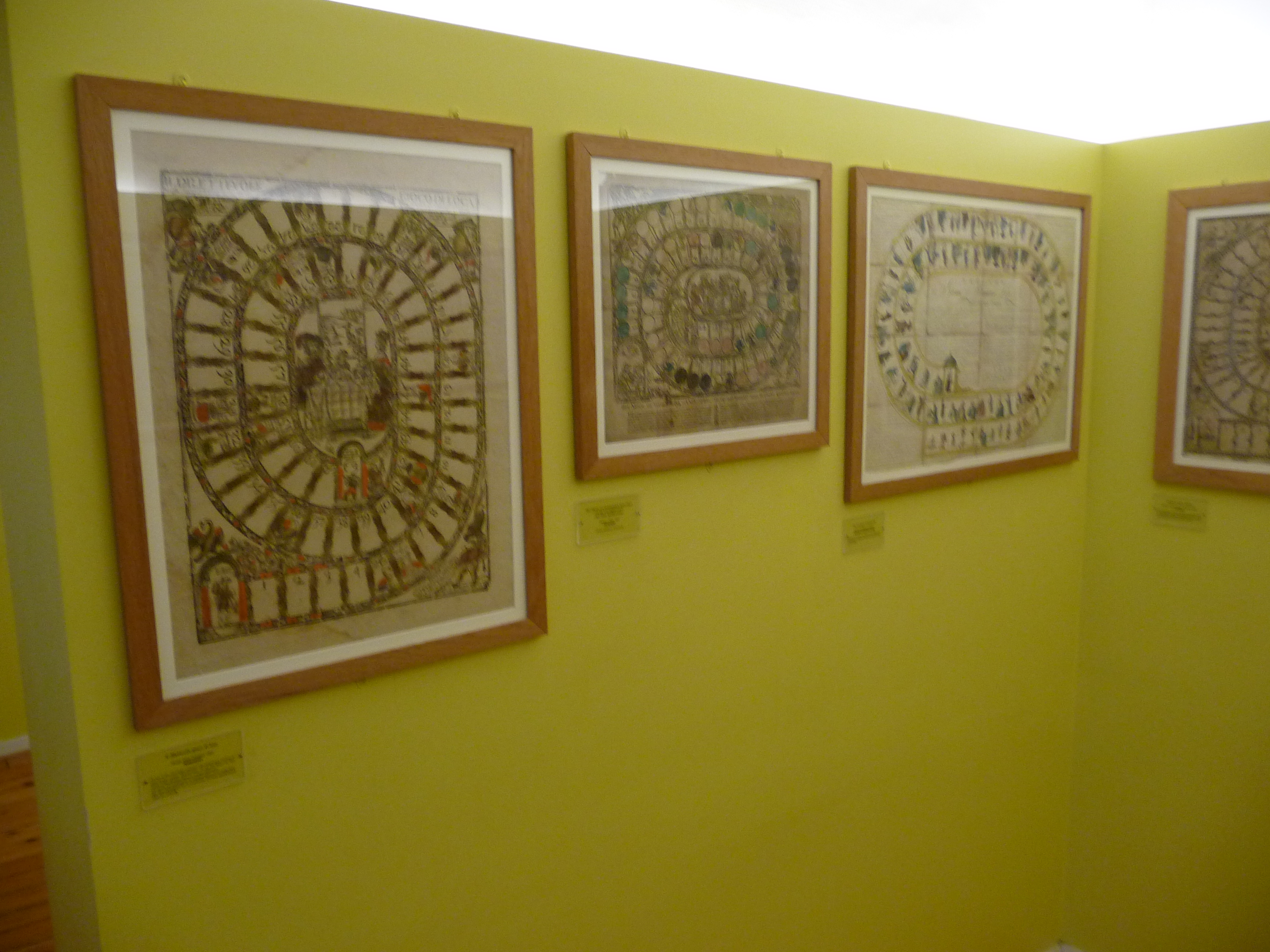
Games displayed

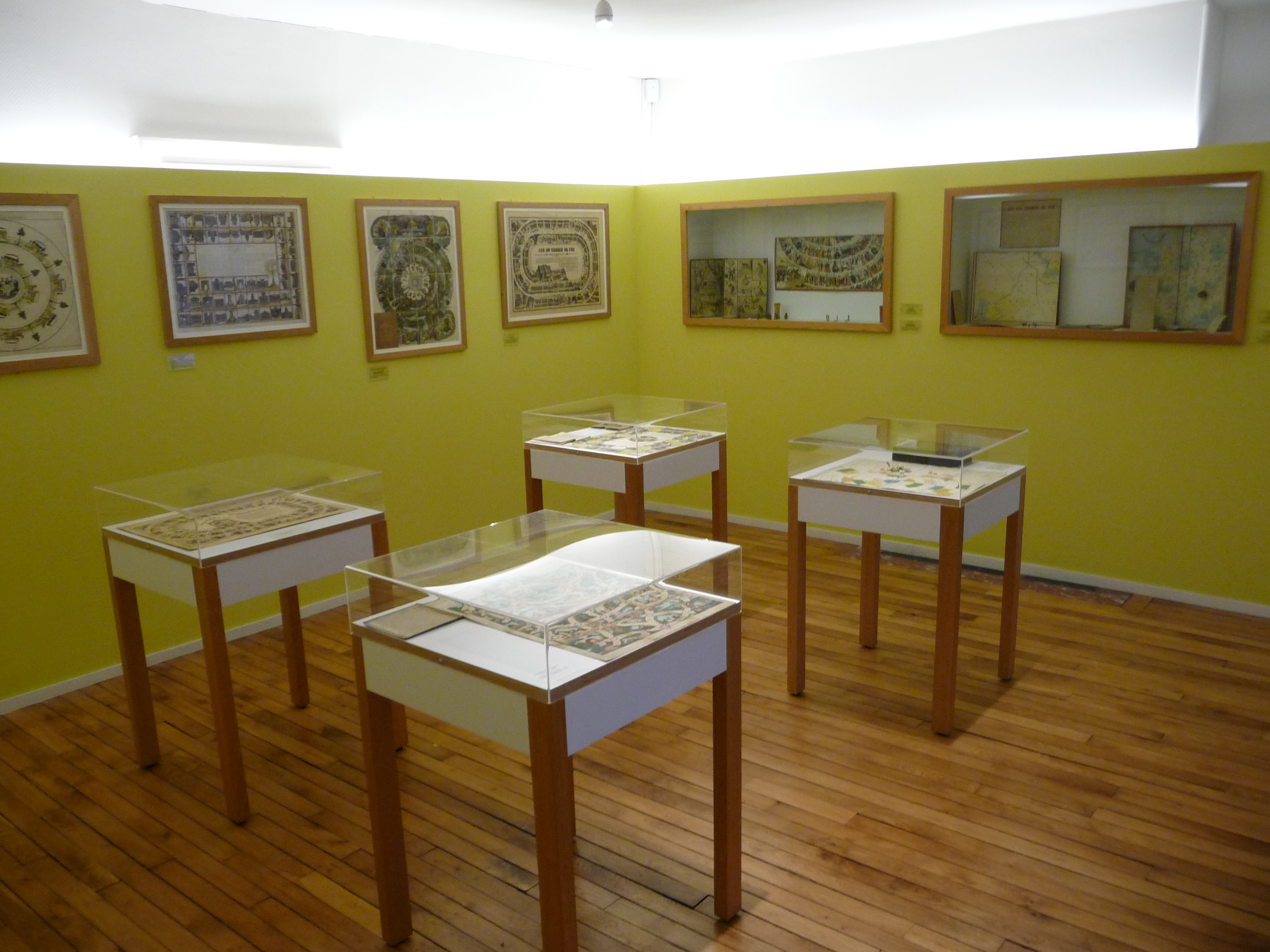
A room presenting other goose games

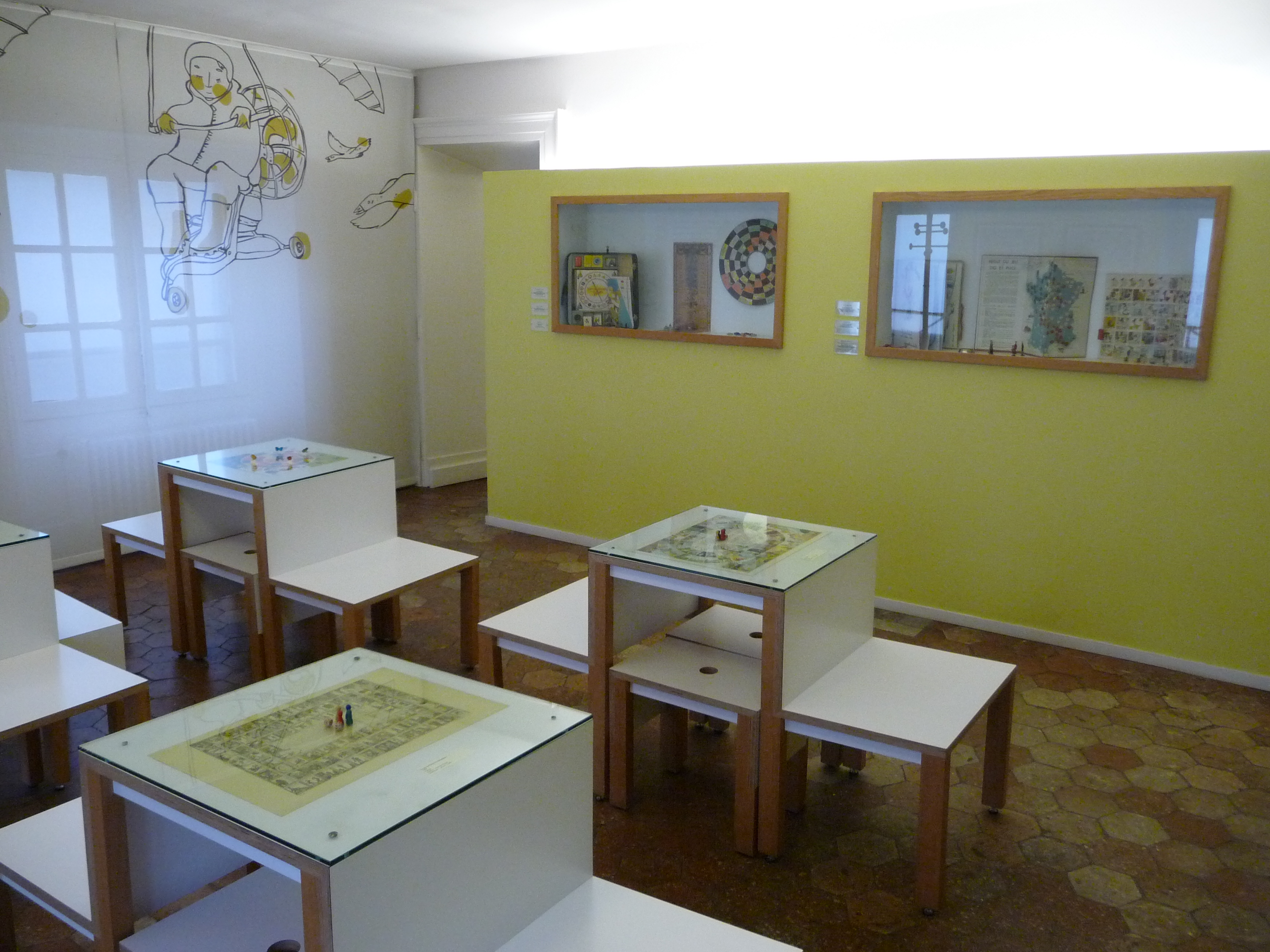
Visitors can play some of the exhibited games.

== See also ==
- Game of the Goose
- Rambouillet
