= Charles François Delamarche =

French geographer and mapmaker

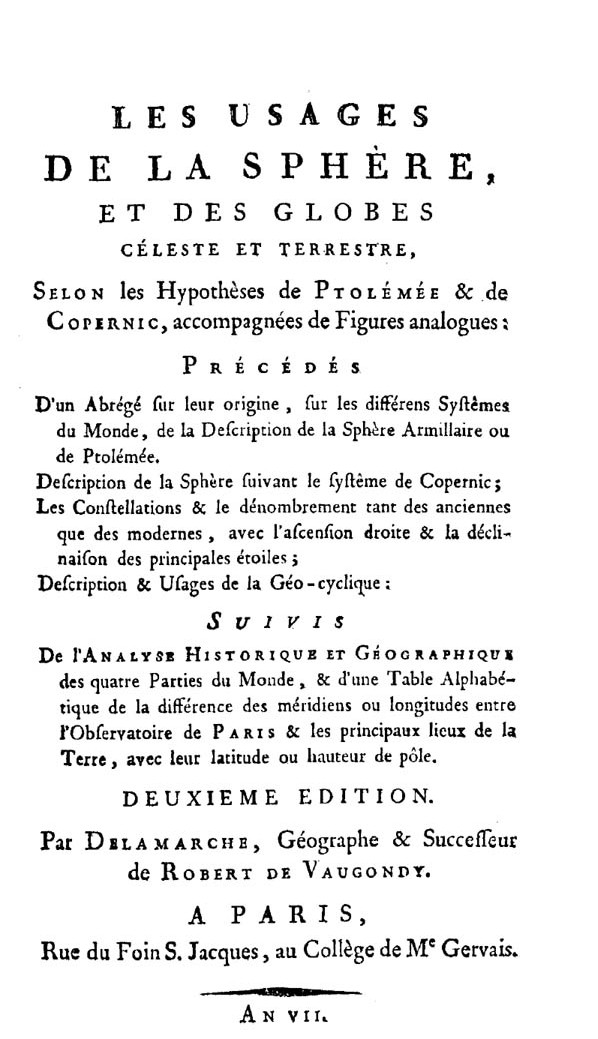
Usages de la sphère, et des globes celeste et terrestre, selon les hypothèses de Ptolèmée et de Copernic, 1794

Charles-François Delamarche (August 1740 – 31 October 1817) was a French geographer and mapmaker.

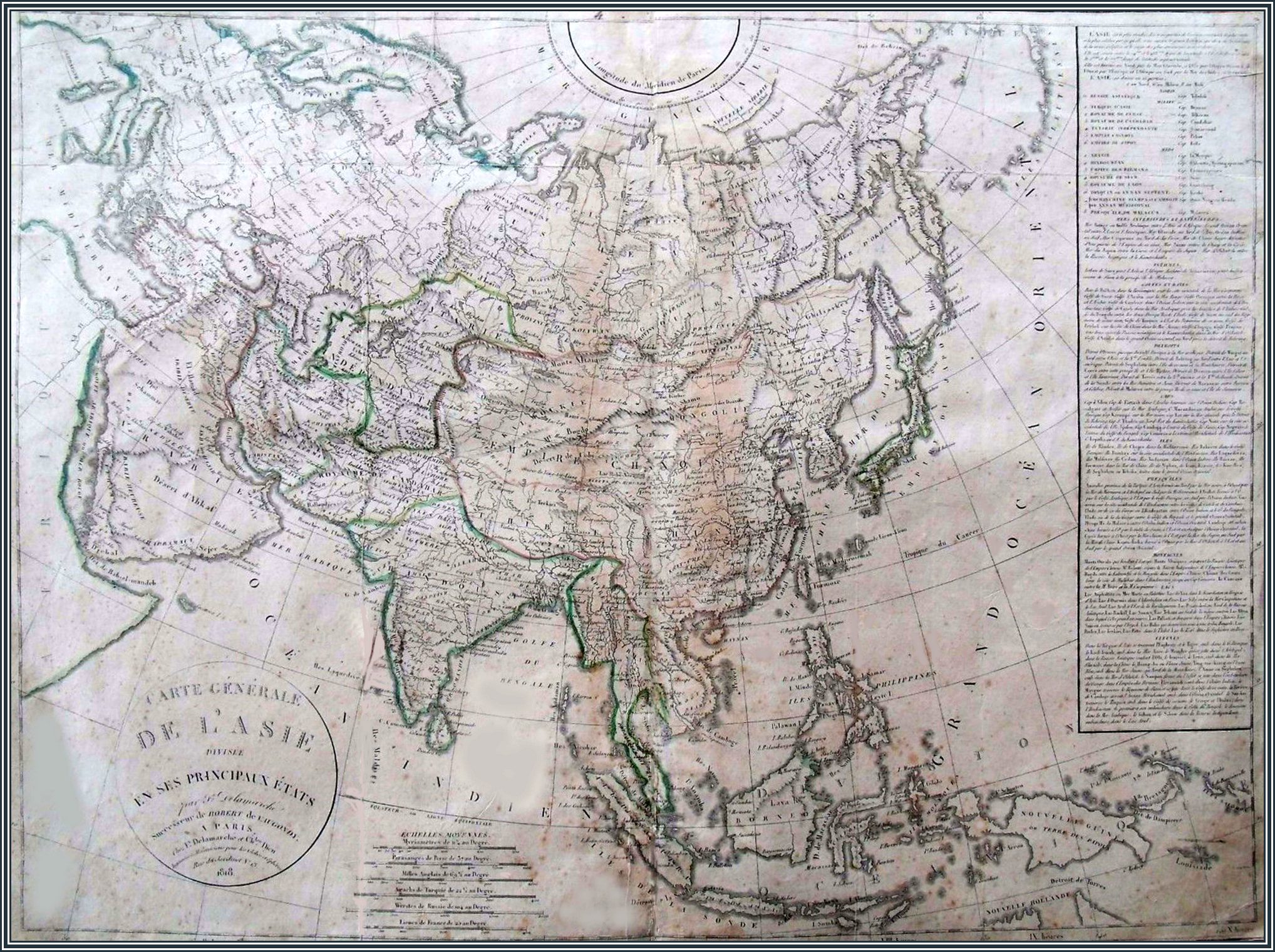
«Carte générale de l'Asie divisée en ses principaux états», Delamarche, 1818

One of the most important French geographers and mapmakers of the second half of the eighteenth century. Successor to Nicolas Sanson (1600–1667), Robert de Vaugondy (1686–1766), and Rigobert Bonne (1727–1794), whose atlases he reprinted. Also taught geography. In addition to maps and globes, his works include a treatise on the use of the sphere and celestial and terrestrial globes. In the treatise, he illustrates both the Ptolemaic and Copernican systems, as well as listing all the ancient and modern constellations. His son Félix Delamarche (18th century – 1st half 19th century) continued his work.

== Works ==
- Usages de la sphère, et des globes celeste et terrestre, selon les hypothèses de Ptolèmée et de Copernic (in French). Paris: Charles François Delamarche. 1794–1795.
