= Nicolas Sanson =

French cartographer (1600–1667)

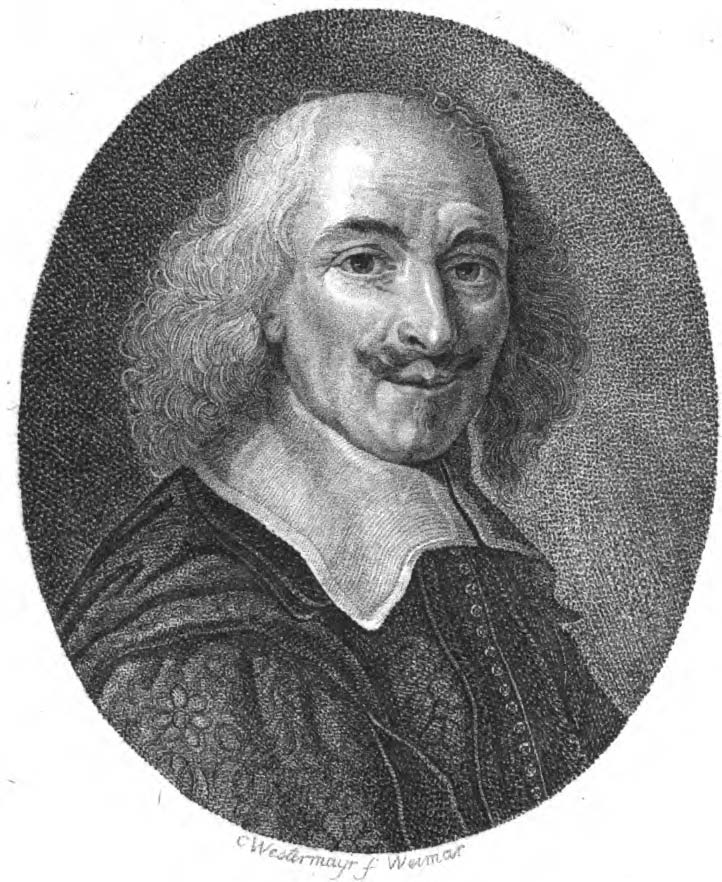
Sanson

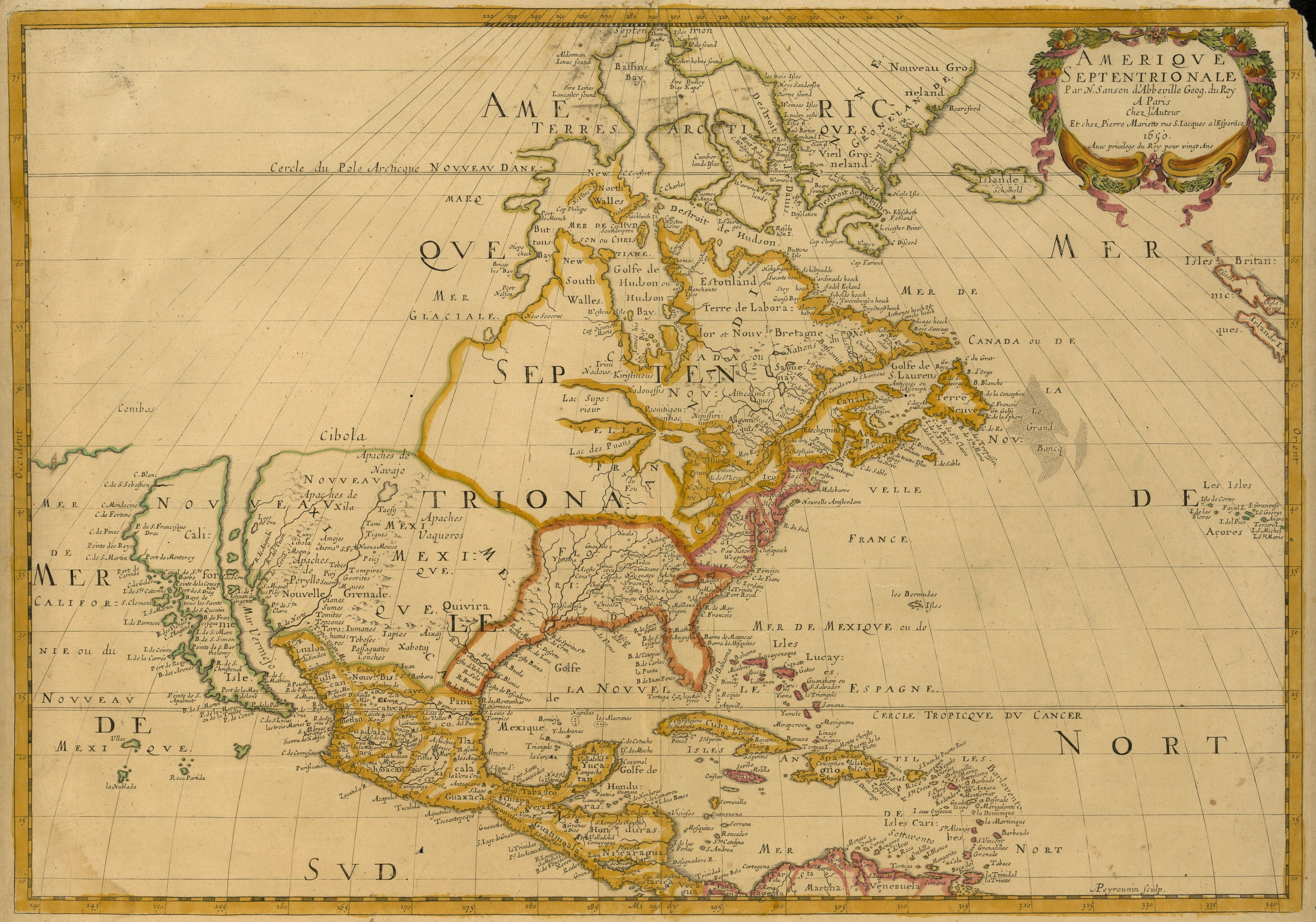
A 1650 map of Sanson's showing North America (with California depicted as an island)

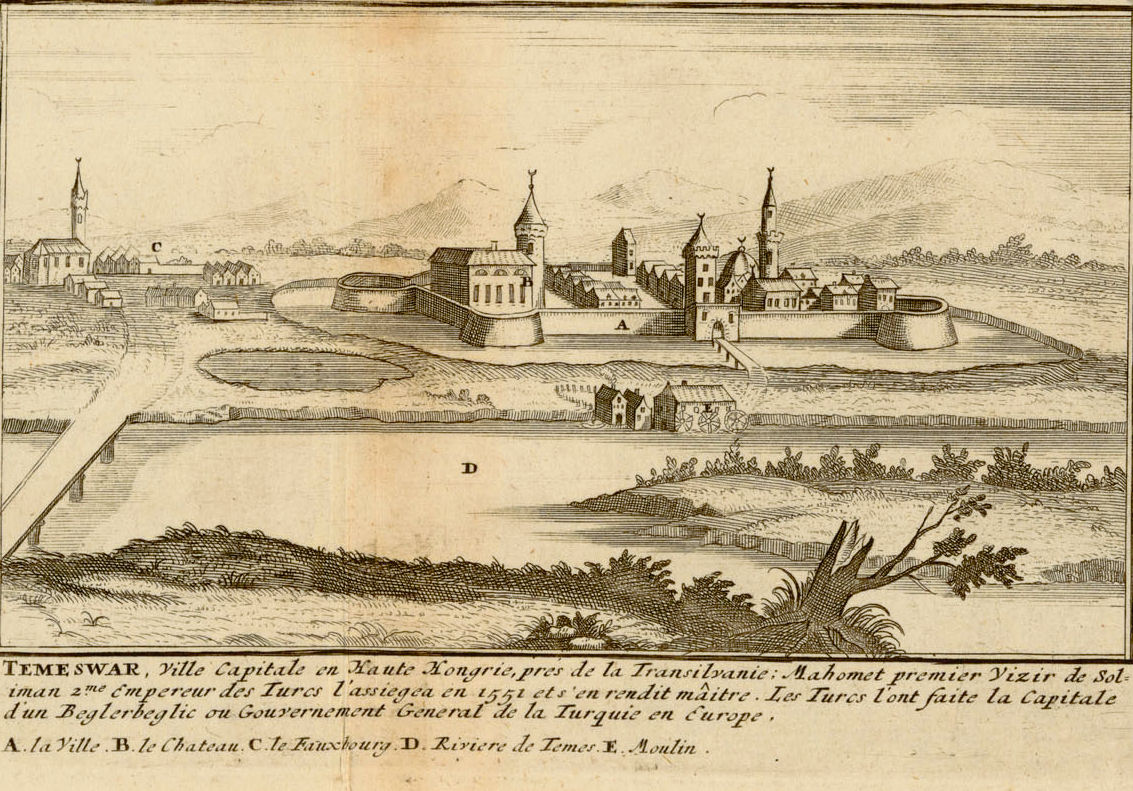
Temeswar, now Timișoara in Romania, view by Sanson of 1656

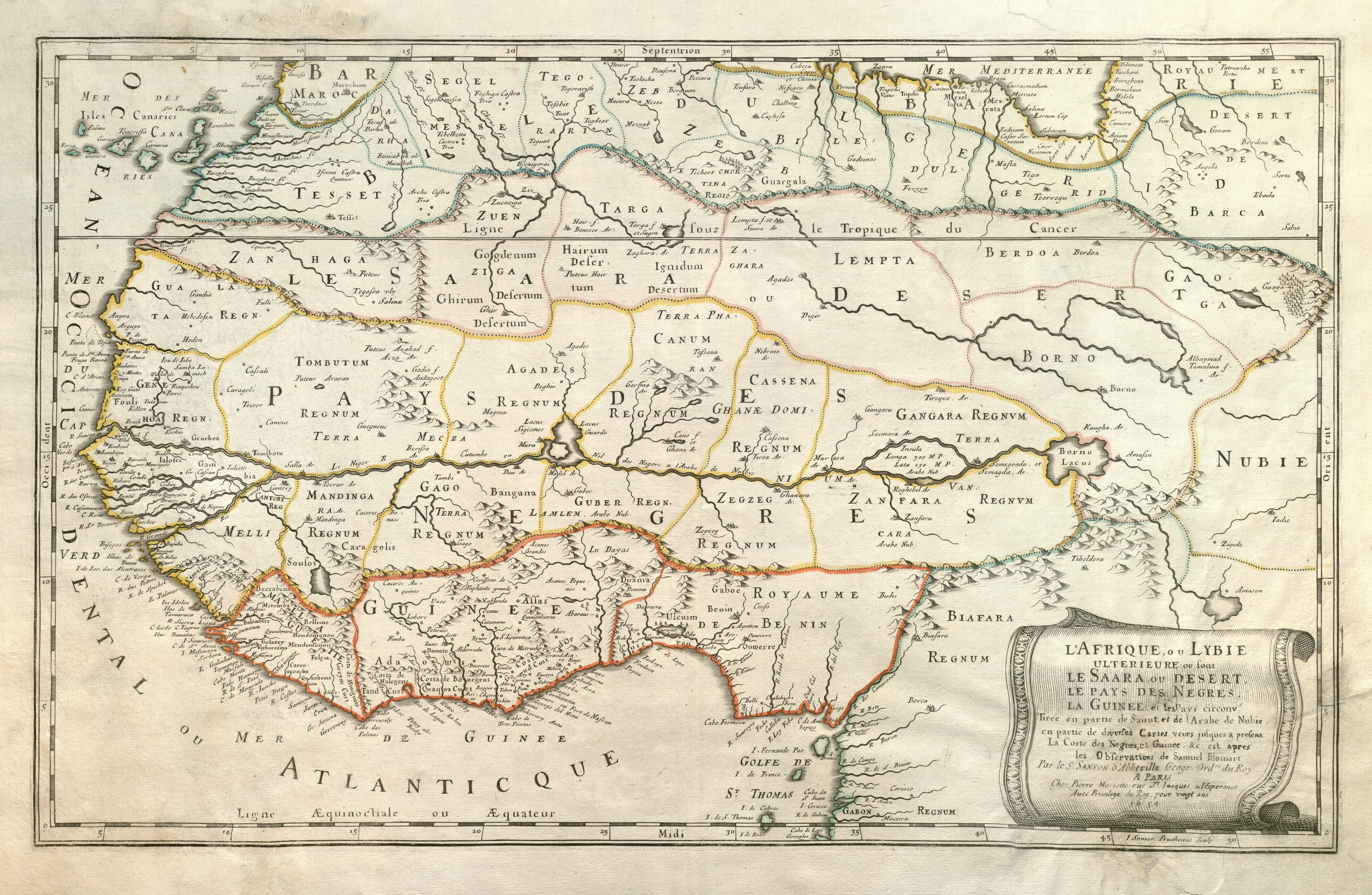
Sanson's map of West Africa, 1655

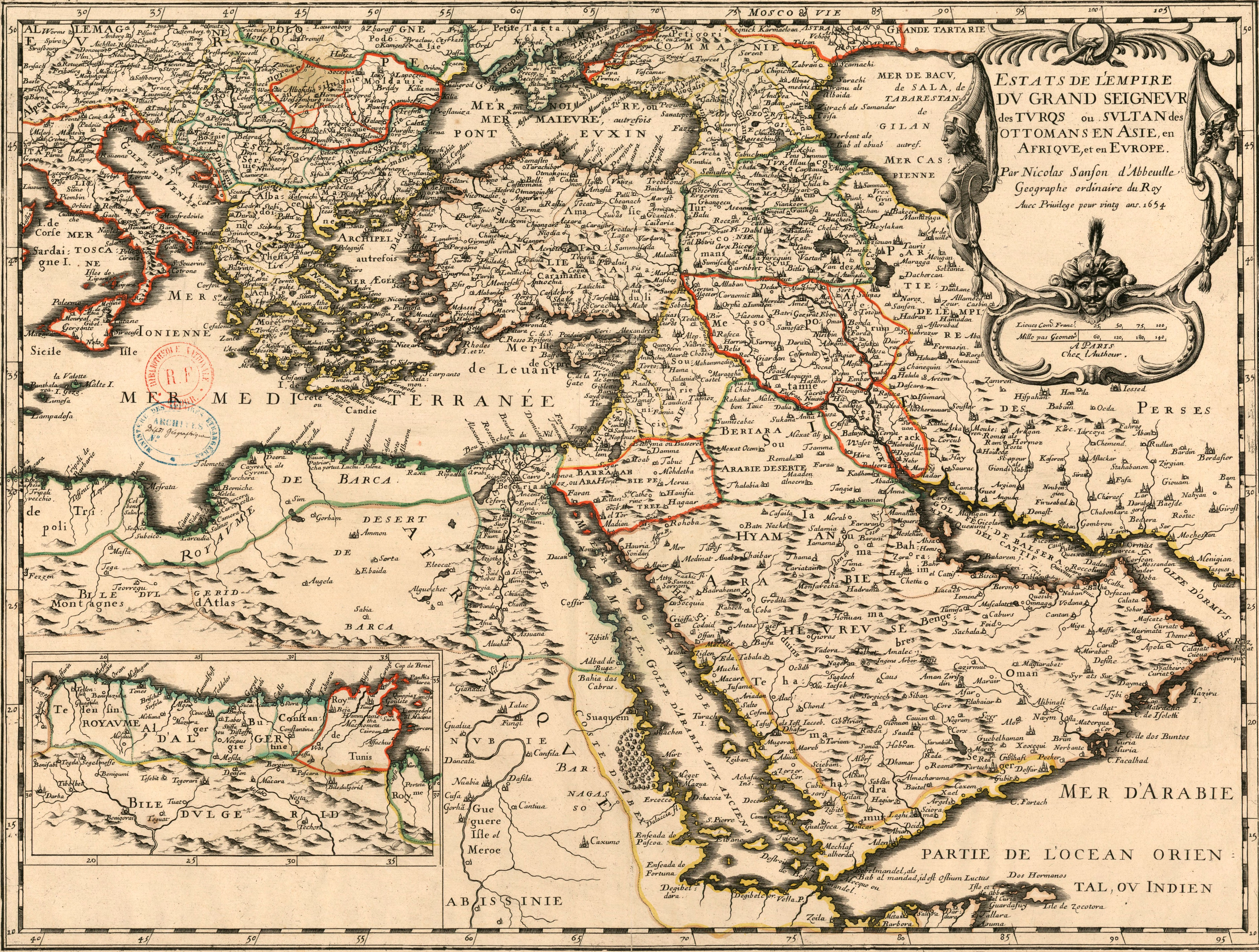
Map of the Ottoman Empire (1654), Nicolas Sanson

Nicolas Sanson (20 December 1600 – 7 July 1667) was a French cartographer who served under two kings in matters of geography. He has been called the "father of French cartography."

== Life and work ==
Sanson was born of an old Picard family of Scottish descent, at Abbeville, on 20 (or 31) December 1600, and was educated by the Jesuits at Amiens.

In 1627 he attracted the attention of Richelieu by a map of Gaul which he had constructed (or at least begun) while only eighteen. Sanson was royal geographer. He gave lessons in geography both to Louis XIII and to Louis XIV; and when Louis XIII, it is said, came to Abbeville, he preferred to be the guest of Sanson (then employed on the fortifications), instead of occupying the lodgings provided by the town. At the conclusion of this visit the king made Sanson a councillor of state.

Active from 1627, Sanson issued his first map of importance, the "Postes de France", which was published by Melchior Tavernier in 1632. After publishing several general atlases himself he became the associate of Pierre Mariette, a publisher of prints.

In 1647 Sanson accused the Jesuit Philippe Labbe of plagiarizing him in his Pharus Galliae Antiquae; in 1648 he lost his eldest son Nicolas, killed during the Fronde. Among the friends of his later years was the great Condé (Louis II of Bourbon). He died in Paris on 7 July 1667. Two younger sons, Adrien (d. 1708) and Guillaume (d. 1703), succeeded him as geographers to the king.

In 1692 Hubert Jaillot collected Sanson's maps in an Atlas nouveau. See also the 18th-century editions of some of Sanson's works on Delamarche under the titles of Atlas de géographie ancienne and Atlas britannique; and the Catalogue des cartes et livres de géographie de Sanson (1702).

Sanson's maps were used as a model by his son, Guillaume, and, at least initially, by Pierre Duval, his nephew, in his 1664 folio map and 1660 atlas minor map. Outside of France, Sanson influenced the Italian mapmakers Giovan Battista Nicolosi, Giovanni Giacomo de Rossi (1677), and Paolo Petrini. In England, Richard Blome (1669) used his map. Sanson continued to influence later mapmakers to 1700 through his association with Alexis-Hubert Jaillot and, to a lesser degree, Duval.

== Principal works ==
Sanson's principal works were:

- Galilee antiquae descriptio geographica (1627);
- Graeciae antiquae descriptio (1636);
- L'Empire romain (1637);
- Britannia, ou recherches de l'antiquité d'Abbeville (1638), in which he seeks to identify Strabo's Britannia with Abbeville;
- La France (1644);
- Tables méthodiques pour les divisions des Gaules (1644);
- L'Angleterre, l'Espagne, l'Italie et l'Allemagne (1644);
- Le Cours du Rhin (1646);
- In Pharum Galliae antiquae Philippi L'Abbe disquisitiones (1647–1648);
- Remarques sur la carte de l'ancienne Gaule de César (1651);
- L'Asie (1652);
- Index geographicus (1653);
- Les Estats de la Couronne d'Arragon en Espagne (1653);
- Geographia sacra (1653);
- Estats de l'Empire du Grand Seigneur des Turqs ou Sultan des Ottomans en Asie, en Afrique, et en Europe (1654);
- L'Afrique (1656)
- Sanson, Nicolas (1656), Le Canada ou Nouvelle France, &c., Paris: Chez Pierre Mariette, OCLC 32881783
- Sanson, Nicolas (1658), Cartes générales de toutes les parties du monde, Paris: P. Mariette, OCLC 11510414
- Tables geographiques des divisions du globe terrestre (1677). Paris: H. Jalliot. 26 p.
