= Hôtel de Ville, Rambouillet =

Town hall in Rambouillet, France

Hôtel de Ville
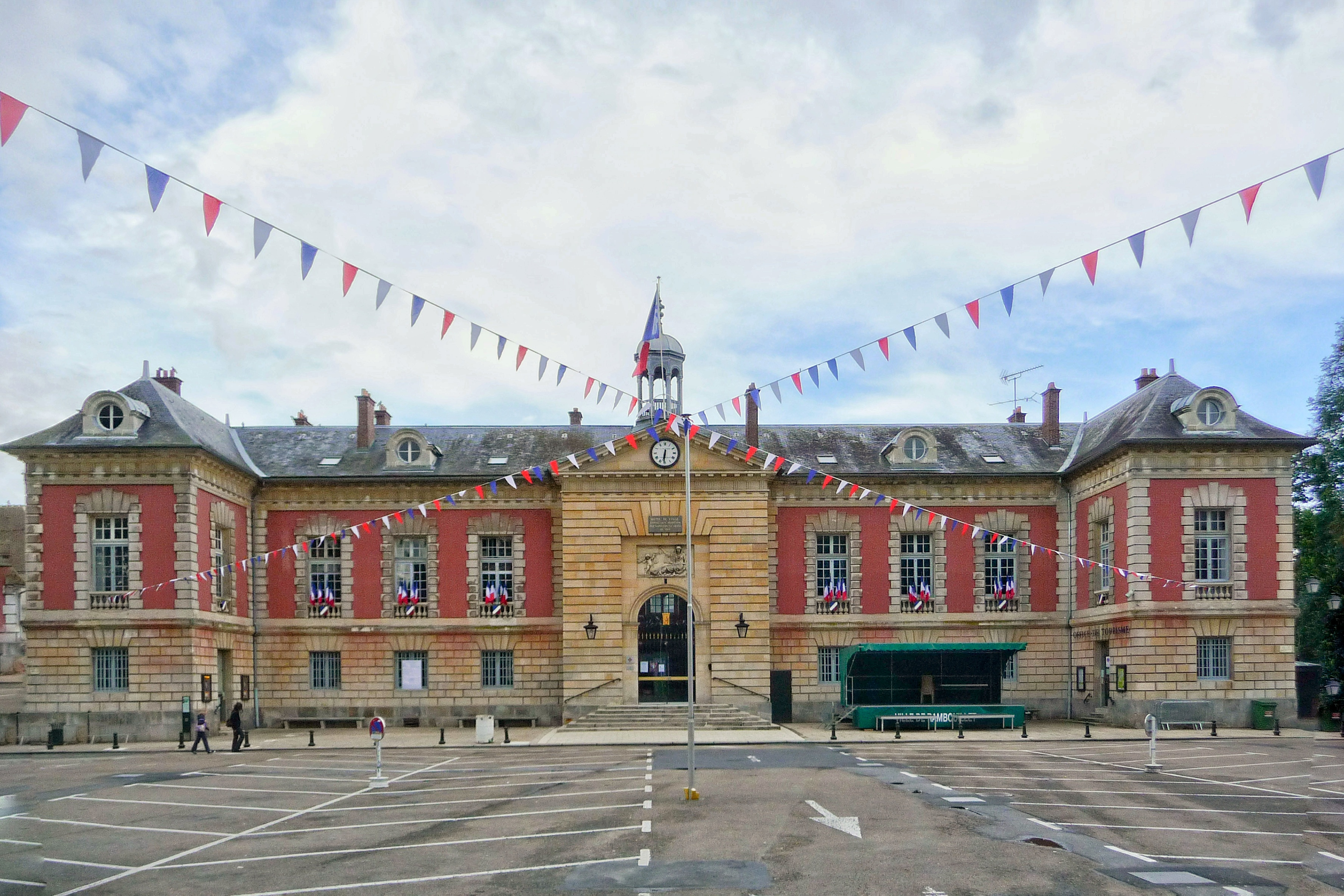
- The reception block at the Hôtel de Ville in July 2012

General information
- Type: City hall
- Architectural style: Neoclassical style
- Location: Rambouillet, France
- Coordinates: 48.6451°N 1.8197°E
- Completed: 1787

Design and construction
- Architect: Jacques-Jean Thévenin

Monument historique
- Official name: Hôtel de ville
- Type: Inscrit
- Designated: 1965
- Reference no.: PA00087583

The Hôtel de Ville (French pronunciation: [otɛl də vil], City Hall) is a municipal building in Rambouillet, Yvelines, in the southwestern suburbs of Paris, standing on Place de la Libération. It was designated a monument historique by the French government in 1965.

== History ==
After Louis XVI acquired the Château de Rambouillet as an extension to his hunting ground in January 1784, the director of the royal estates, Charles Claude Flahaut, Count of Angiviller, identified an area on the east side of the estate for the local bailiff's courthouse. The building was designed in the Jacques-Jean Thévenin in the neoclassical style, built in ashlar stone from the limestone quarries at Saint-Leu-d'Esserent, and was completed in 1787.

The design involved a symmetrical main frontage of nine bays facing towards the château with the end bays projected forward as pavilions. The central bay, which was rusticated on both floors, featured a short flight of steps leading up to a round headed doorway with a moulded surround. There was a bas-relief depicting justice at first floor level, and the whole bay was surmounted by an entablature with triptychs and a modillioned pediment with a clock in the tympanum. The other bays were fenestrated by small square windows on the ground floor and by tall casement windows with voussoirs and keystones on the first floor. At attic level there were four circular dormer windows. Internally, the principal room was the courtroom where the bailiff presided. Works of art in the courtroom included a fine hunting map of the local area.

Following the French Revolution, the emperor Napoleon took possession of the château in March 1806 and then gave the bailiff's courthouse to the town council to serve as its town hall. A panel bearing the inscription "Hôtel de Ville donné aux habitants par Napoléon le Grand en 1809" (Town hall donated to the inhabitants of Rambouillet by Napoleon the Great, [in the] Year 1809) was installed above the central bay. The courtroom was subsequently converted for use as the Salle du Conseil (council chamber). An octagonal belfry designed by Charles Avril was installed on the roof in 1862.

On 16 August 1944, during the Second World War, American troops arrived in a jeep at the town hall and German troops were subsequently rounded up and held prisoner by the French Forces of the Interior in the south wing of the town hall.

The original double-panel wooden door was replaced by a glass door, giving extra light to the foyer, in 1975, and repairs to the windows were carried out in 2019.
