= Pierre Duval (geographer) =

French geographer

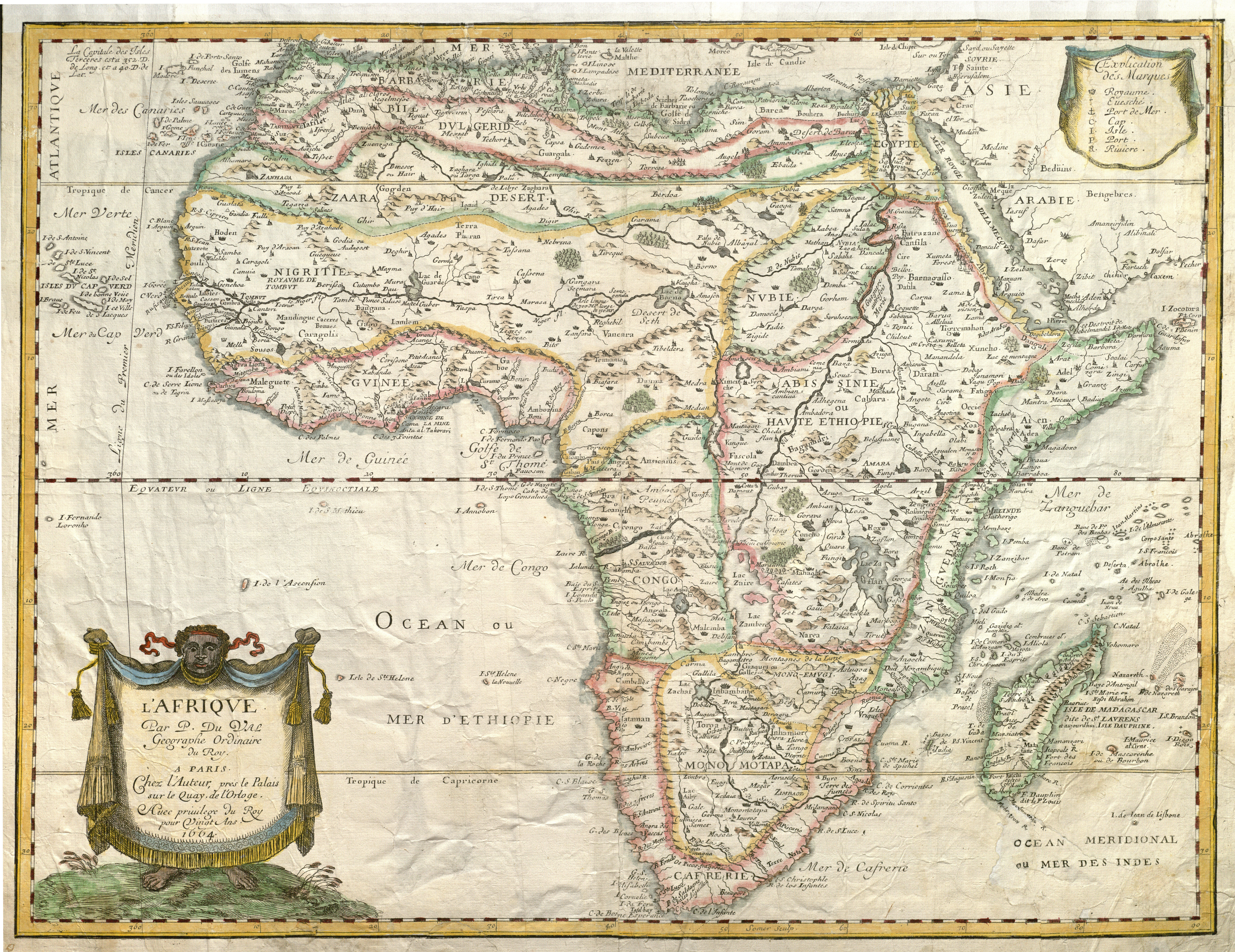
Duval's 1664 map of Africa

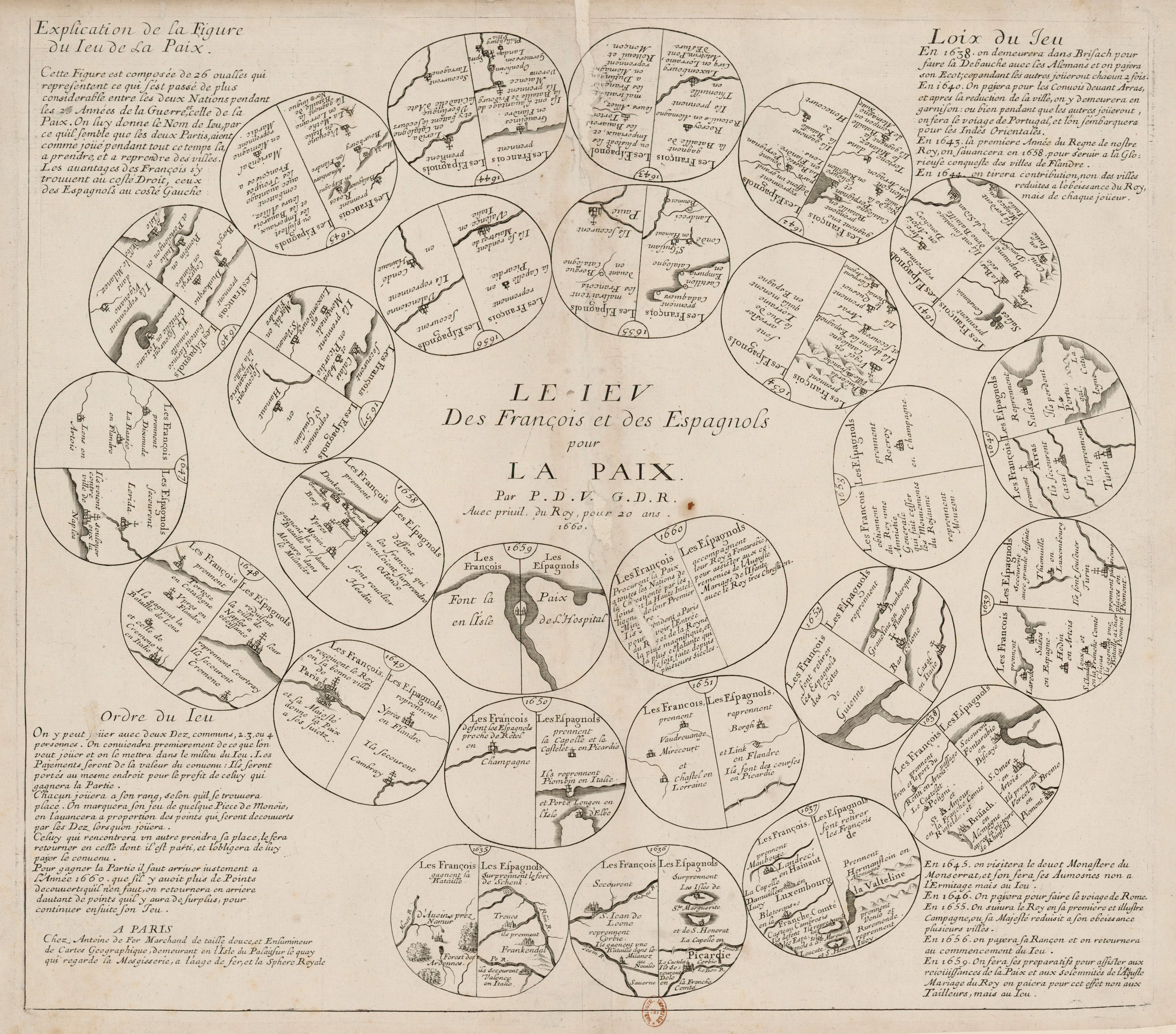
Le jeu des François et des Espagnols pour la Paix ("The game of the French and the Spanish for peace"), 1660 board game.

Pierre Duval (1618–1683) was a French geographer.

Pierre Duval was born in Abbeville. He was the nephew and pupil of the geographer Nicolas Sanson. Encouraged by Louis XIV to move to Paris, he later became Geographe Ordinaire du Roy. He was also a globe maker and printed board games such as the game of the goose.
