= Jean-Baptiste-Michel Renou de Chauvigné dit Jaillot =

French geographer, cartographer, historian and bookseller

- Born: 1710; France
- Died: 5 April 1780 (aged 69–70)

Jean-Baptiste-Michel Renou de Chauvigné dit Jaillot (1710 – 5 April 1780) was a geographer, French cartographer, historian and bookseller in Paris.

== Biography ==
He was the son of Jean-Baptiste-Urbain Renou, a lawyer in the Paris parlement, and his maternal grandfather was Alexis-Hubert Jaillot. He took the name "Jaillot" after marrying his cousin Françoise Jaillot in February 1755. He took the Jaillot estate that his wife had held since 1749 with her three sisters, as well as the title of Geographer Ordinary of the King, inherited from his father-in-law Father Bernard-Jean-Hyacinthe Jaillot.

He was member of the Academy of Sciences. He died childless in Paris on 5 April 1780. His sister, Charlotte-Ursule Renou de Varennes, sole heiress, sold off his estate of maps and mapboards at auction in March 1781; part of it was bought by Jean-Claude Dezauche, publisher and dealer in geographical maps.

Jaillot, "one of the most perspicacious and exacting minds of the historiography of the ancien regime," is particularly known for his work Critical, Historical and Topographic Research on the City of Paris, published in five volumes at From 1772.

One lane in the 5th district of Paris, Passage Jaillot, is named in his memory.

== Bibliography ==
- Records International Virtual Authority File $\bullet$National Library of France

== The maps of Jaillot ==
=== As cartographer ===
- Map of Prague and its surroundings, 59 x 54 cm, 1757. (Gallica [ archive ] .)
- New Plan of the city of Paris and its suburbs, 91 x 62 cm, 1770.
- New Plan of the city and fauxbourgs of Paris, 46 x 39 cm, 1777. (Gallica [ archive ] .)
- The German Empire divided into its principal estates, where all the roads of the posts are accurately noticed, even in Poland and Hungary, at Desnos, 1782. (Gallica [ archive ]).
