= Olivier Delamarche =

French economic analyst

- Born: February 9, 1966 (age 59)
- Occupation: Economic analyst

Olivier Delamarche (born 9 February 1966) is a French economic analyst known for being the columnist for the television show C'est Cash on RT France.

== Biography ==
A former member of the French Society of Financial Analysts (SFAF), Delamarche was an analyst and then a sales trader for Pinatton, Wargny and Leven.

He created his own Sicav in 2004, then in 2005 a management company called Platinium Gestion which he sold in 2014.

From 2009 to 2017, he was a weekly columnist on BFM Business. However, he often took pessimistic views on the economy which the channel's writers were opposed to, so they decided not to keep him.
