= Félix Delamarche =

French geographer and engineer

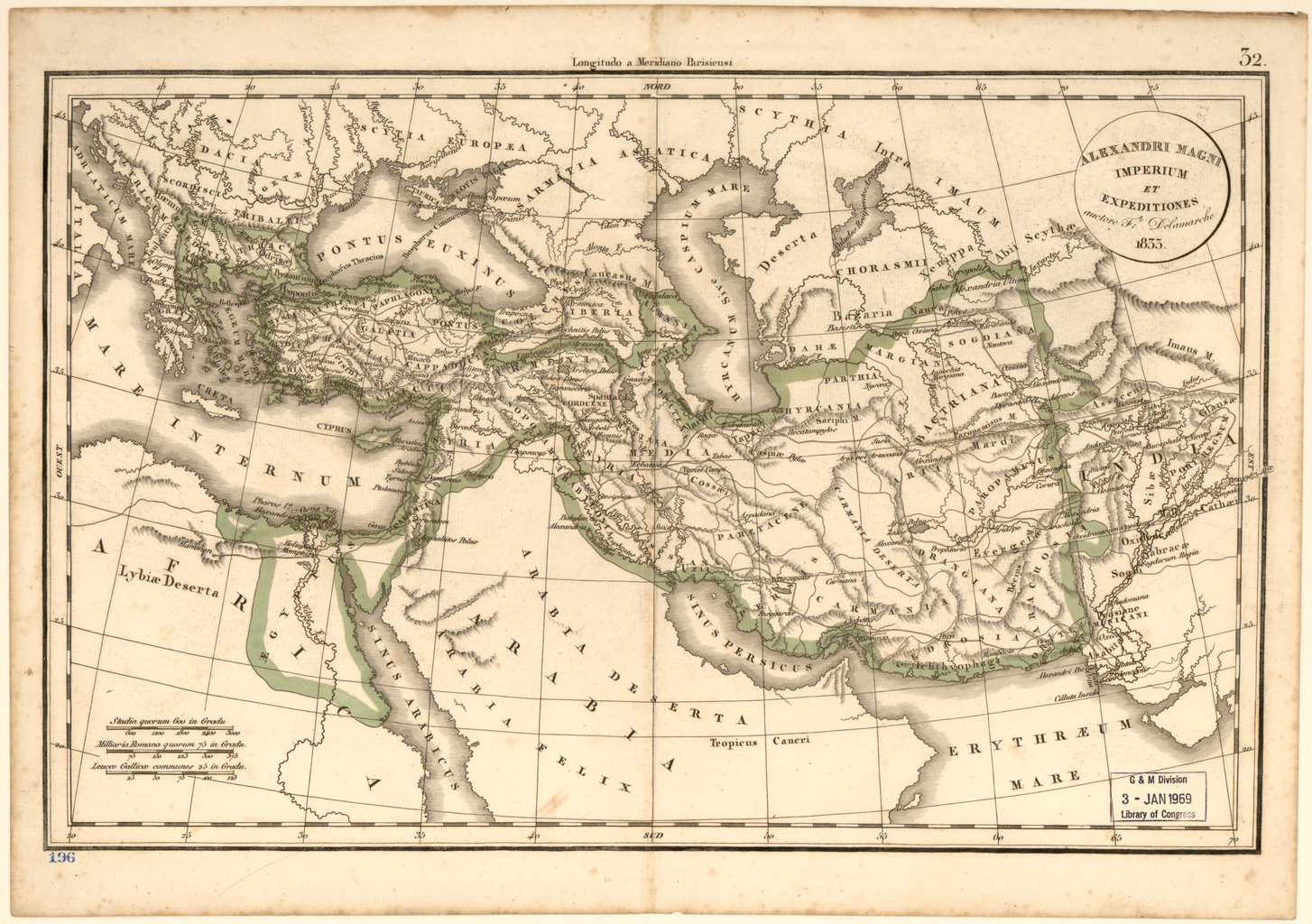
The Empire and Expeditions of Alexander the Great by Félix Delamarche, 1833

Félix Delamarche was a French geographer and engineer who flourished during the 18th century and early 19th century. His father was the map publisher Charles Francois Delamarche.

Félix Delamarche became the owner of his father's map publishing company, Maison Delamarche. He ran the company alongside cartographer Charles Dien. The firm would eventually be passed down to Alexandre Delamarche. Delamarche created Atlas de la géographie ancienne et moderne in 1820. The atlas was reprinted during the 19th century. It was utilized by the Ecole Spéciale Militaire de Saint-Cyr. His work is held in the collection of the Library of Congress.
