= Avignon-lès-Saint-Claude =

Commune in Bourgogne-Franche-Comté, France

- Commune
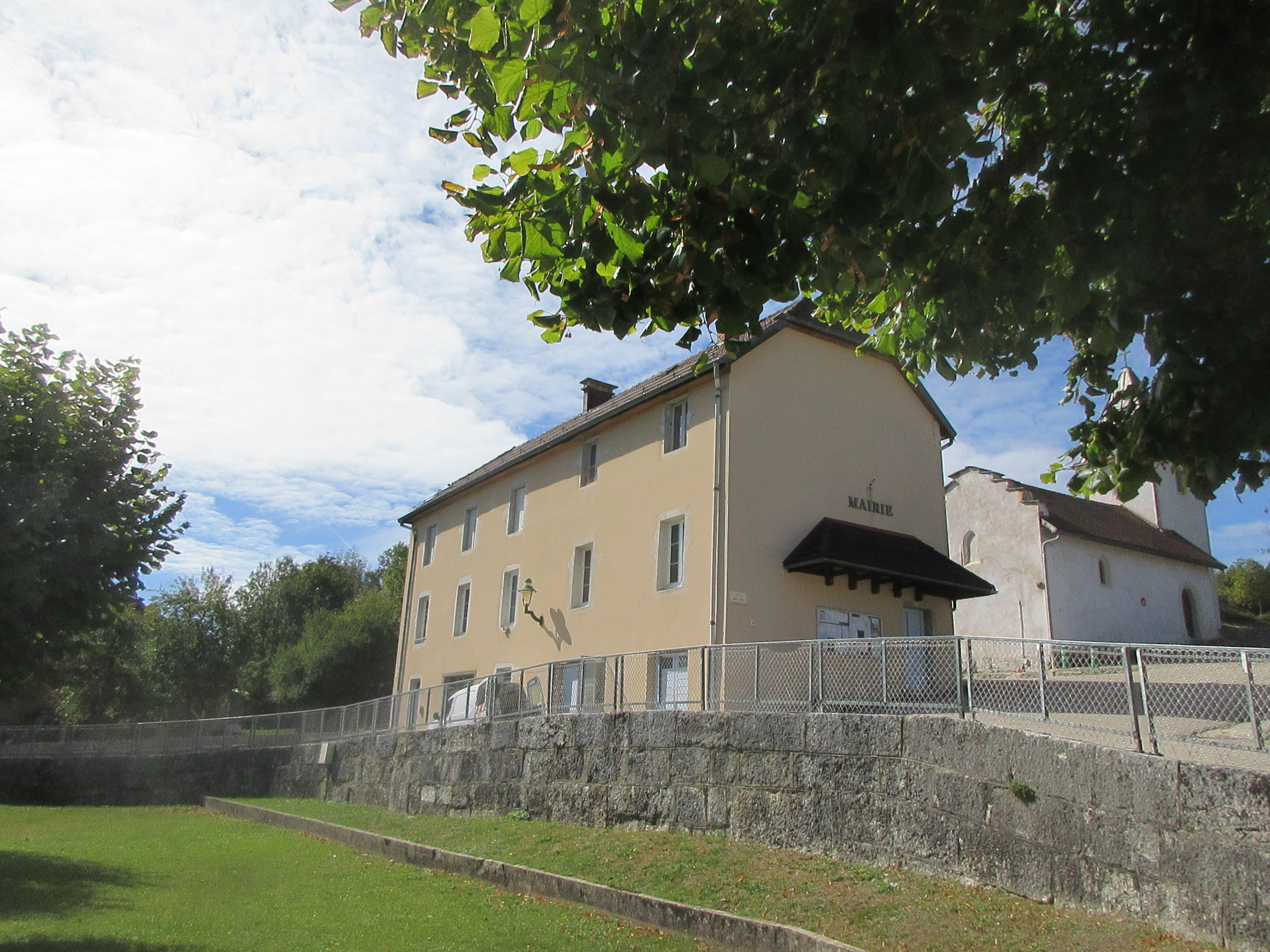
- The town hall in Avignon-lès-Saint-Claude
- Location of Avignon-lès-Saint-Claude
- Location within France Location within Bourgogne-Franche-Comté
- Coordinates: 46°23′29″N 5°50′50″E
- Country: France
- Region: Bourgogne-Franche-Comté
- Department: Jura
- Arrondissement: Saint-Claude
- Canton: Saint-Claude
- Intercommunality: CC Haut-Jura Saint-Claude

Government
  - Mayor (2020–2026): Caroline Braun
- Area^{1}: 7.83 km^{2} (3.02 sq mi)
- Highest elevation: 917 m (3,009 ft)
- Lowest elevation: 580 m (1,900 ft)
- Population (2023): 348
  - Density: 44.4/km^{2} (115/sq mi)
- Time zone: UTC+01:00 (CET)
  - Summer (DST): UTC+02:00 (CEST)
- INSEE/Postal code: 39032 /39200
- ^{1} French Land Register data, which excludes lakes, ponds, glaciers > 1 km^{2} (0.386 sq mi or 247 acres) and river estuaries.

Avignon-lès-Saint-Claude (French pronunciation: [aviɲɔ̃ lɛ sɛ̃ klod], literally Avignon near Saint-Claude) is a commune in the Jura department in the region of Bourgogne-Franche-Comté in eastern France.

== Population ==
Historical population
Year	Pop.	±% p.a.
1968	166	—
1975	164	−0.17%
1982	319	+9.97%
1990	361	+1.56%
1999	309	−1.71%
2007	347	+1.46%
2012	373	+1.46%
2017	383	+0.53%
2023	348	−1.58%
Source: INSEE

== See also ==
- Communes of the Jura department
