= Game of the Goose =

Board game

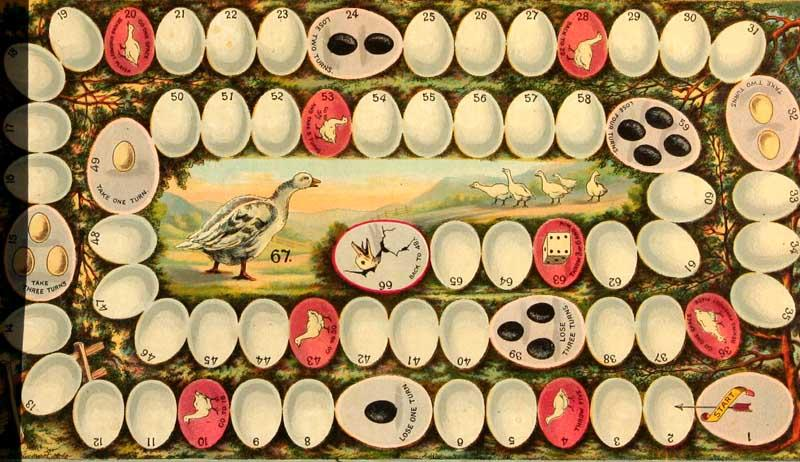
A Game of the Goose board

The Game of the Goose, also known as the Royal Game of the Goose, is one of the first board games to be commercially manufactured. It is a race game that relies only on dice throws to dictate progression of the players. The board is often arranged in the form of a spiral, with game pieces starting on the most outward part. All spaces on the game board are numbered, with some depicting an illustration of either a goose or a hazard indicating a specified action. The aim of the game is to reach the 63rd space before any of the other players, while avoiding hazards such as the Hotel, the Bridge, and Death.

The game is thought to have originated in Italy during the 15th century, being given by Francesco de Medici as a gift to King Philip of Spain. In the 17th and 18th century, the game gained immense popularity throughout Europe. The game's popularity led it to different adaptations throughout Europe and the United States. Despite numerous adaptations, the rules have mostly remained the same throughout the years.

== History ==
The game's origins are uncertain but are thought to originate from Italy and from inspiration of other spiral board games. It is claimed to be the first modern board game. According to board game historian, Adrien Seville, the earliest recorded mention of the game was in a book of sermons by the Dominican friar Gabriele da Barletta published in 1480. In the 15th century, it was largely considered as a gambling game. By the 17th century the game was played across many European countries with various models of the game.

A version of the game was given as a gift by Grand Duke Francesco I de' Medici of Tuscany to King Philip II of Spain sometime between 1574 and 1587. In June 1597 John Wolfe enters the game in the Stationers' Register, as "the newe and most pleasant game of the goose". James VI of Scotland ordered his painter James Workman to make a board for the game called "the guse" in 1602.

The game has long been in production. It was manufactured using wood by Dutch printers. By the 19th century, the game was marketed as a children's game.

=== Indian and Asian origins ===
The oldest board for Game of the Goose can be found today in the Metropolitan Museum of Art in New York. This board shows a 15th century Italian influence concerning the design of the game play but the material construction of the board from wood, ivory and gold is similar to products from 16th century North India, and the ivory inlay is thought to be the work of Gujarati craftsman. This board follows most of the classical descriptions of the game but with a few differences concerning the hazard spaces. In 2017, another board made its way to the Paris gallery of Sylvie L'Hermite-King. This board dates back to the late 16th century and the Portuguese State of North India. The Game of the Goose made its way to Asia through Portuguese ships sailing to India. Boards made in India at the time were considered to be highly treasured in Europe.

== Theories and symbolism ==
The ancient Egyptian board game of Mehen also features a track that spirals inward; although the rules of the game remain unknown, it is theorized that Mehen may have been a simple race game similar to Goose. The Phaistos Disc also features a spiral track, such that some amateur theorists identify it as a board game in the Mehen/Goose family. Caroline Goodfellow notes that the two games (if the Phaistos Disc represents a game board at all) "are unlikely to have been the same".

Another theory links the game to the Pilgrims' Way to Santiago, or the Road to Saint James of Compostela, in Galicia. According to this hypothesis, the game was invented by the Knights Templar, who were in charge of protecting those on pilgrimage to the main holy cities: Compostela, Rome and Jerusalem.

According to Christine Damste, the game was created with the intent to symbolize the fate humans experience in life. The significance of having 63 playing squares represents the "Grand Climacteric'' signifying the crucial years of life. Nine is the ruling number of the game, perhaps because it is a perfect square, giving the game a mystical connection. The Hazard spaces of the game also have meaning associated with them: The Bridge is thought to represent a rite of passage; the Hotel represents the earth; Death refers to a new start; the Maze represents something wrong, and the Well and Prison indicate that help is required. In Italy, geese are considered lucky symbols; however, there are many plausible theories that have been proposed to the significance of geese.

== Board ==
Although there have been countless variants of the gameboard over time, it has managed to maintain a consistent form. The gameboard's "standard form" consists of a track with 63 consecutively numbered spaces arranged in a spiral, 13 of which are goose-spaces and 6 of which are hazard spaces. The hazard spaces include The Bridge, The Hotel, The Well, The Maze, The Prison and Death. Players begin on the outermost square of the spiral and advance inwards.

=== The Goose-spaces ===
Depicted by a drawing of a goose, landing on one allows the player to advance further by the same number of spaces they had thrown. While these spaces are considered the most favourable, landing on one can also have unintended consequences. To win the game, a player must roll a number that lands them exactly on the 63rd space. Should they overthrow, they must move backward by the amount they overstepped. Should the player land on a goose as they move backward, they must move further back by the amount they initially overstepped with the possibility of hitting a hazard space. The standard form of the game shows a goose on spaces 5, 9, 14, 18, 23, 27, 32, 36, 41, 45, 50, 54, 59 and on 63, the winning space.

=== The hazard spaces ===
==== The Bridge ====
Depicted by a drawing of a bridge, this space acts as a shortcut which moves the player to some other specified position. The standard form of the game shows The Bridge on space 6; landing on it moves the player to space 12.

==== The Hotel ====
Depicted by a drawing of a hotel, landing on this space requires the player to remain on the space and miss one turn. The standard form of the game shows The Hotel on space 19.

==== The Well ====
Depicted by a drawing of a well, landing on this space leaves the player stuck there until another player arrives to pull them out—that player then takes their place. The standard form of the game shows The Well on space 31.

==== The Maze ====
Depicted by a drawing of a maze, landing on this space forces the player to move backward to a specified space. The standard form of the game depicts The Maze on space 42.

==== The Prison ====
Depicted by a drawing of a prison, landing on this space leaves the player trapped there until another player arrives to release them—that player then takes their place. The standard form of the game shows The Prison on space 52.

==== Death ====
This space is the least favourable of the hazard spaces. Usually depicted by a drawing of a skeleton, landing on this space forces the player to move all the way back to the starting space. According to Adrian Seville, death in the game is not considered physical, but a "death of the soul". The standard form of the game shows Death on space 58.

== Equipment ==
A standard set of the Game of the Goose includes one gameboard, four goose-shaped pieces of different colours and two six-sided dice.

== Rules ==
Each player begins with their token placed on the first tile. The game can be played by a minimum of two people and requires two six-sided dice. Players alternate by rolling the dice and moving their pieces by the amount given by the sum of the two dice. The player who rolls the highest on the first round goes first; however, there are special cases. If the first throw is a six and a three, the piece moves to space 26, or if the first throw is a five and a four, the piece moves to space 53. This rule was created to avoid the case in which a player throws a 9 in the first round, leading to an instant win, given that landing a goose space allows the player to advance forward by the number they had rolled, and a goose appears every nine spaces. This would lead the player to instantly reach the 63rd space.

To win the game, a player must be the first to reach the 63rd space on an exact throw. Should a player overthrow, they must move backward from the 63rd space by the amount they overthrew. Should the player subsequently land on a goose space after moving backward, they must move backward by the amount thrown, with the possibility of again landing on a goose or on a hazard space. Two players cannot exist on the same square. Should a player land on a square already occupied by an opponent, they must swap places.

There are other special spaces one must pay attention to when playing the game: if one lands on space 6 (the Bridge), the piece must move to square 12; if one lands on space 19 (the Hotel), one must miss one turn; if one lands on space 31 (the Well), one must wait until another player lands on the same square, and get your place; if one lands on space 42 (the Maze), the player goes back to space 39; if one lands on space 52 (the Prison), one must wait for someone to release one, and take one's place; if one lands on space 58 (Death), one must restart the game.

== In worldwide culture ==
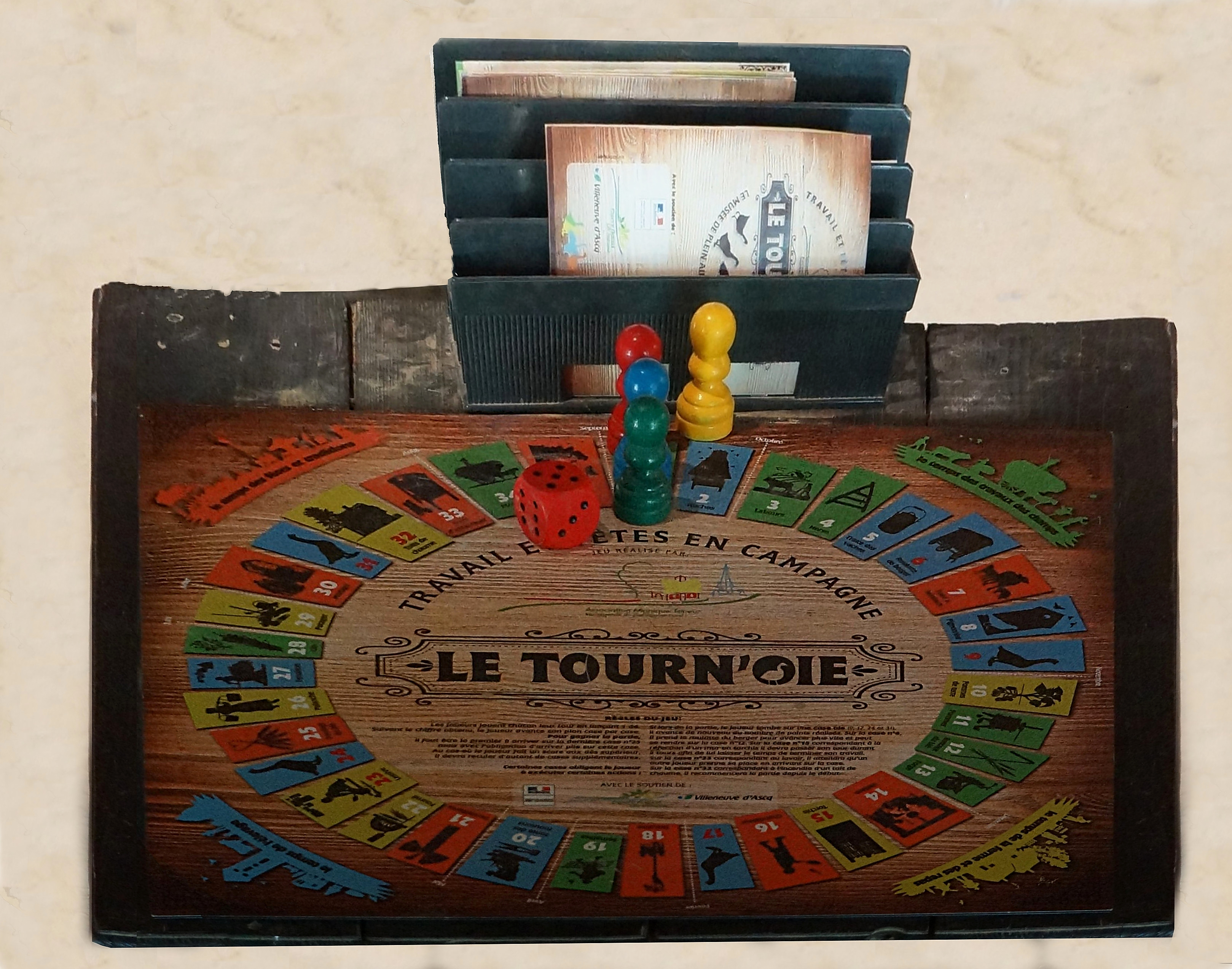
Game of the Goose "Tourn'Oie" Work and holidays in campaign Musée de Plein air, Villeneuve-d'Ascq, France

- In Jacques Offenbach's comic opera La Belle Hélène, the Greek Kings sing about and play a Game of the Goose and argue over cheating.
- In his 1899 novel Le Testament d’un excentrique, Jules Verne uses the United States as a giant real-life Game of the Goose board, on which seven players race each other in pursuit of a $60,000,000 inheritance.
- In Roger Martin du Gard's novel The Thibaults, Monsieur Chasle, the proprietor of a store that markets various inventions, mentions that one of his designers has created a portable jeu de l'Oie des Alliés imprinted with scenes from the Battle of the Marne, Douaumont, and other battles of World War I.
- In Ursula Dubosarsky's novel for children, The Game of the Goose (Penguin Australia 2000), three children find an old copy of the Game of the Goose in a Salvation Army store, and have magically transforming adventures while playing it.
- The game was the basis for a game and stunt show in Italy named Il Grande Gioco Dell'Oca (The Great Game of the Goose), as well as the near-identical Spanish version, El gran juego de la oca (same). The Spanish version ran from 1993 to 1995, and again in 1998 as El nuevo juego de la oca (The New Game of the Goose).
- In Jacques Rivette's film, Le Pont du Nord, the game is described by the main character, Marie Lafée. The game itself provides the plot structure.
- In book, The Night of Turns, published by Broodcomb Press under the name of Edita Bikker, the Game of the Goose is integral to the movements of people travelling in caravans through an otherworldly land.

== Variations ==
=== France ===
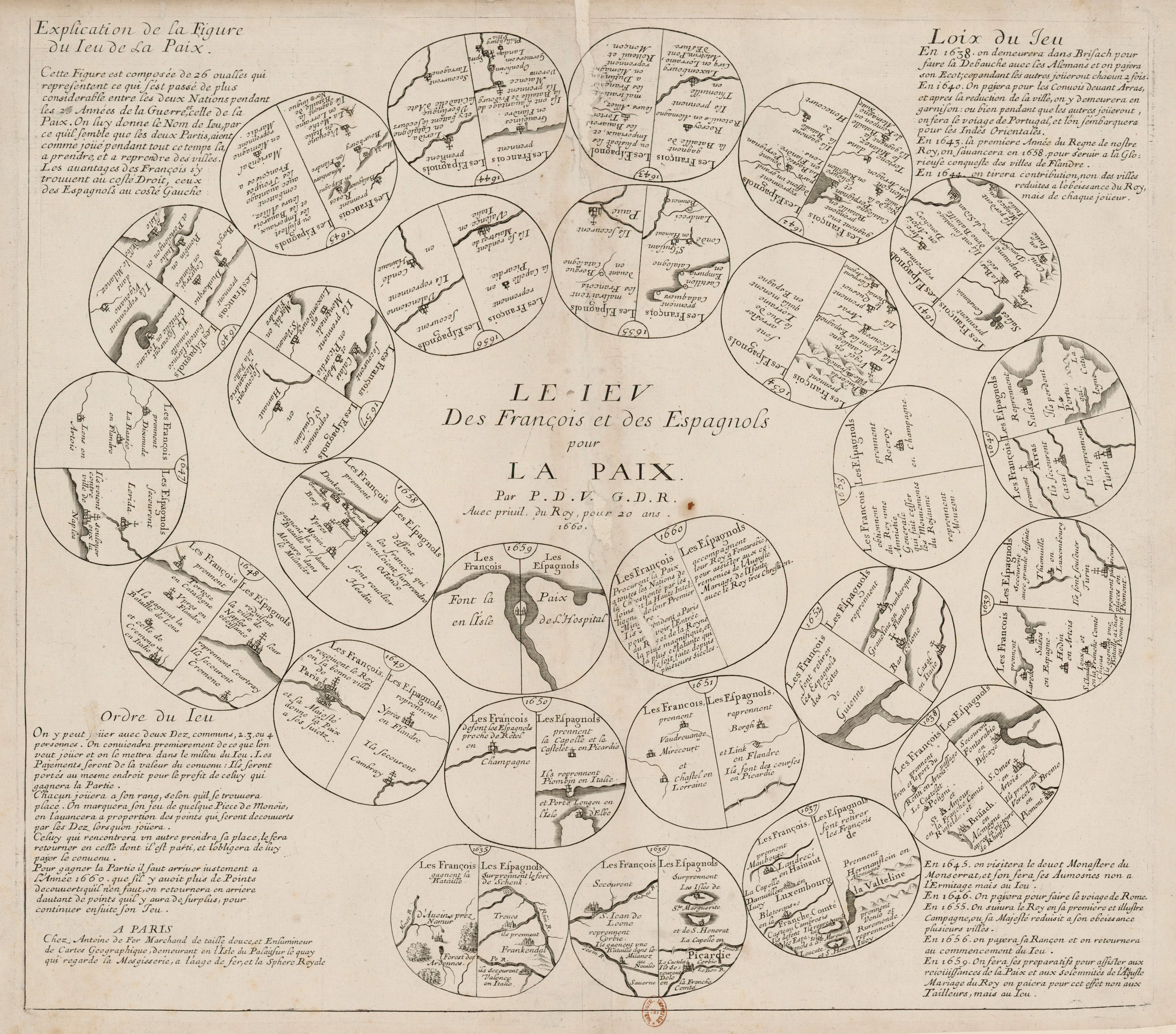
Le jeu des François et des Espagnols pour la Paix ("The game of the French and the Spanish for peace"), 1660 board game about the Franco-Spanish War (1635–1659) by Pierre Duval

Educational race games based on the "Game of the Goose" are a French invention of the 17th century. The earliest known adaptation is Pierre Marriette's "Jeu Chronologique" dated 1638, with the purpose of teaching History. Successive versions taught geography, the arts of war, and heraldry, produced from expensively engraved copper plates as opposed to the provincial productions of games from woodcut blocks. These games retained the essential structure of the “Game of the Goose,” rewarding good luck and punishing bad luck. However, modifications had the purpose of attracting diverse audiences, such as children, travellers, or those interested in specific activities such as horse racing or hunting.

=== England ===
A century later, England joined the trend of educational race games with John Jeffreys’ 1759 "A Journey through Europe, or the Play of Geography," printed by Carington Bowles. The first dated game of this kind marked a significant step in the evolution of educational games to facilitate the teaching of geography in the region. All used a teetotum, rather than dice, to move players around the board and avoid association with gambling.

The 18th-century English game "Courtship and Matrimony" has a track that is 64 spaces long. However, this game has a unique rule for the Prison space at No. 55. If a player of the opposite sex lands on the same space, it simulates a "Fleet marriage," resulting in an immediate win and a division of the pot. This rule plays on the historical context of rapid marriages that took place in London's Fleet Prison.

The 19th century British variation called "The New Royal Game of the Goose" offers a distinct rule at space 57, where a depicted man with a pipe suggests a gendered activity. Any player, unless they are female, are sent back to space 47, hinting at the societal views on smoking as an exclusively masculine activity.

=== United States of America ===
Crossing the Atlantic, the "Game of the Goose" was tailored once again. In the United States, "The Mansion of Happiness" was published in 1843 as one of the first board games mass-produced in America. The adaptation was designed by Anne Abbott, a clergyman's daughter from Beverly, with the purpose of instilling ethical values based on Christian morality. It used gameplay to reflect the lively path to happiness. An introductory verse in the instructions makes this clear:

At this amusement each will find A moral to improve the mind. It gives to those their proper due Who various paths of vice pursue, And shows (while vice destruction brings) That Good from every Virtue springs. Be virtuous then and forward press To gain the seat of Happiness

=== Germany ===
Meanwhile, In Germany, around 1933, the “Reise durch Deutschland” (Tour of Germany) was published. At first glance, it mirrored Swiss games designed in the late 19th century to promote tourism, but its purpose was evidently more profound. The game carried a political message, reflecting on the division of Germany after the Treaty of Versailles. It featured depictions of rural workers in traditional attire and opened with a reference to the first Reichstag by Hitler.

=== Netherlands ===
A Dutch variation published in 1858 called "Sint Nicolaas," involves the initial dice throw to affect the gameplay differently based on the player's gender. An initial throw of 6 and 3 moves male players to space 25 and female players to space 26, each marked by images of a young man or woman. Conversely, an initial throw of 5 and 4 moves male players to space 51 and female players to space 53, marked with images of an older man or woman, with the implication of being past marriageable age.

=== Male / Female Rules ===
Historical variations of the “Game of the Goose” often reflect the cultural norms and gender roles of their times through the rules that differ according to the gender of the player.

== See also ==
- Snakes and Ladders
